= The Disappearance of Eleanor Rigby (soundtrack) =

2014 soundtrack albums

The Disappearance of Eleanor Rigby (Original Motion Picture Soundtrack)

Soundtrack album by various artists
- Released: October 27, 2014
- Length: 46:38
- Label: Lakeshore

The Disappearance of Eleanor Rigby (Original Score)

Film score by Son Lux
- Released: November 4, 2014
- Genre: Film score
- Length: 32:38
- Label: Glassnote
- Producer: Son Lux

Son Lux chronology
Lanterns (2013)	The Disappearance of Eleanor Rigby (2013)	Bones (2015)

Music for the 2014 American film The Disappearance of Eleanor Rigby is composed by Ryan Lott under his solo experimental music project Son Lux. The film is the directorial debut of Ned Benson, starring James McAvoy and Jessica Chastain and also is the collective title of three films: Him, Her and Them. The musical promotions preceded with the soundtrack consisted of songs performed by bands and musical projects, through Lakeshore Records on October 27, 2014. Son Lux's score was released through Glassnote Records on November 4, 2014.

== Background ==
The original score for The Disappearance of Eleanor Rigby was scored by Son Lux, which only featured Ryan Lott as the band member. It was their maiden feature film as a composer. By late-2013, Lott had completed scoring music for the film. The music was mostly driven with the help of acoustic and electronic instrumentation. Rafiq Bhatia, who joined the Son Lux in 2015, months after the film's release, attributed on the end credits piece which Lott composed, that mostly driven through human actions and people affecting environments, recalling on most of the natural and acoustic medium blended with the electronic texture. Bhatia noted that a key texture came from the two-note chords which he tracked on the guitar, looped and reversed, which Lott mapped to the keyboard and played back at different tempos to create a new instrument. Lott also used the props and set pieces from the film to create music; this included the sounds of wine glasses from a romantic interaction between the main leads being played as an instrument.

== Reception ==
Austin Trunick of Under the Radar stated that "a wonderful score from Son Lux fits the bitter tone to a tee." Michael Rechtshaffen of The Hollywood Reporter wrote "Good and bad songs play a big role on the soundtrack, with New York alternative hip-hop composer Son Lux supplying the former. Not a single note of the Beatles' 'Eleanor Rigby' is heard. It isn't necessary: You sing it to yourself." Sheri Linden of Los Angeles Times wrote "the score by Son Lux accentuates a lush dreaminess." Nikola Grozdanovic of IndieWire called the soundtrack having "beautiful accompanying music and songs". Scott Foundas of Variety wrote "the original score by post-rock/hip-hop whiz Son Lux (nee Ryan Lott) strik[es] the right ambient mood." Bridget R Irvine of The Harvard Crimson described it as "pensive yet light music".

Ryan Leas of Stereogum described the use of Orchestral Manoeuvres in the Dark's "So in Love" in the dance sequence between Connor and Eleanor as one of the best soundtrack moments of 2014. Son Lux's score was shortlisted as one among the 114 contenders for the Academy Award for Best Original Score at the 87th Academy Awards.

== Track listing ==
=== The Disappearance of Eleanor Rigby (Original Motion Picture Soundtrack) ===
No.	Title	Artist(s)	Length
1.	"No Fate Awaits Me"	Son Lux with Faux Fix	4:35
2.	"Wild Is the Wind"	Cat Power	4:10
3.	"So in Love"	Orchestral Manoeuvres in the Dark	3:30
4.	"Blue Ball Blues"	Max Kagan and Scott Weinshank	3:43
5.	"How to Talk to Girls"	James Webber	3:36
6.	"Ciant Hear It (Jungle Remix)"	Elliphant	3:04
7.	"Move On"	Pink Skull	3:48
8.	"Dancing with the Lights Out"	Roxxpin	2:56
9.	"Don't Wake the Dead"	Guards	3:15
10.	"Sailing"	Leisure Cruise	3:20
11.	"Went to War"	Amason	3:01
12.	"The Blame"	Flying Points	3:09
13.	"A Great Design"	Black Marble	4:31
Total length:			46:38

=== The Disappearance of Eleanor Rigby (Original Score) ===
No.	Title	Length
1.	"Fireflies"	1:32
2.	"No Fate Awaits Me"	4:37
3.	"Disappearance"	1:50
4.	"Silence I"	1:44
5.	"Me Follow"	4:48
6.	"Lonely"	1:48
7.	"Race To Erase"	4:51
8.	"Trailing Memory"	1:56
9.	"Silence II"	1:48
10.	"Almost Crossing"	2:42
11.	"After It All"	3:03
12.	"Silence III"	1:51
Total length:		32:30
