= Alternate Forms =

2023 Son Lux album

Remix album by Son Lux
- Released: August 11, 2023
- Label: Joyful Noise Recordings

Alternate Forms is a 9-track remix record of the 2013 Son Lux breakthrough album, Lanterns. It was released on August 11, 2023 by Joyful Noise Recordings, and features experimental artists such as Sen Morimoto, Kishi Bashi and Sound of Ceres. Since composing the score for science fiction action film Everything Everywhere All at Once, this is the band's first new album.

== Track listing ==
| No. | Title | Remix | Length |
|---|---|---|---|
| 1. | "Alternate World (Alternate Life)" | Kishi Bashi remix | 4:10 |
| 2. | "Lost It to Trying (Rise)" | Sen Morimoto + KAINA remix | 2:54 |
| 3. | "Ransom (All Innocence)" | Sedcairn + Sound of Ceres remix | 3:25 |
| 4. | "Easy (Fight to Forget)" | Chris Pattishall + Vuyo Sotashe remix | 4:34 |
| 5. | "No Crimes (New History)" | Jordan Munson + Isaiah Robinson remix | 7:05 |
| 6. | "Pyre (Alarm Bells)" | Anna B Savage + DM Stith remix | 5:58 |
| 7. | "Enough of Our Machines (Walk Away)" | vōx + Alexander Vincent remix | 4:00 |
| 8. | "Plan the Escape (Sirens and Tremors)" | Kilamanzego remix | 3:10 |
| 9. | "Lanterns Lit (Singing Light)" | Omari Jazz remix | 3:04 |
