= Everything Everywhere All at Once (soundtrack) =

Everything Everywhere All at Once (Original Motion Picture Soundtrack)

Soundtrack album by Son Lux
- Released: March 25, 2022
- Recorded: 2016–2022
- Venues: Tennessee; Los Angeles, California; Somerville, Massachusetts
- Studios: Quad Studios Nashville; 17 Hertz; Q Division
- Genres: Ambient; experimental; post-rock
- Length: 114:02
- Label: A24 Music
- Producer: Son Lux

Son Lux chronology
| Tomorrows Reworks (2021) | Everything Everywhere All at Once (2022) | Thunderbolts* (2025) |

Singles from Everything Everywhere All at Once (Original Motion Picture Soundtrack)
- 1. "This Is a Life" Released: March 4, 2022; 2. "Fence" Released: March 14, 2022

Everything Everywhere All at Once (Original Motion Picture Soundtrack) is the soundtrack album to the 2022 film of the same name directed by the Daniels. The original score is composed by the band Son Lux. The album also features other musicians performing the tracks, including Mitski, David Byrne, André 3000, Randy Newman, Moses Sumney, Surrija, and yMusic.

The band worked on the soundtrack for around three to six years, with the band members individually working on sections following the Daniels' advice. Son Lux produced the soundtrack while working on their studio albums Brighter Wounds (2018), the Tomorrows trilogy (2020–2021), and its reprised studio version Tomorrows Reworks (2021). In the process, more than 100 musical cues were created for the album, with 49 songs included on the final release.

The soundtrack's release was preceded by two singles: "This Is a Life" featuring Mitski and Byrne, released on March 4, and "Fence" featuring Sumney, released on March 14. The album was released on March 25, 2022 by A24 Music to positive critical reception for the composition, setting, instrument blending and collaboration of renowned artists. At the 95th Academy Awards, the score was nominated for Best Original Score and the song "This Is a Life" was nominated for Best Original Song.

== Production ==
=== Background ===
The band Son Lux was announced as the film's composer during January 2022. Daniels were appreciative of the musical style and approach for the studio albums. They met the band through FaceTime by late 2019. Daniels did not approach them as a band, instead articulated the importance of the band members' solo projects. The band's lead member, Ryan Lott, said, "[T]hey gave us a lot of license to feel free to be ourselves. They guided us along the way in developing music for this film, and in some instances, there is some interesting kind of bleeding that happened."

"They wanted all these seemingly unrelated things to come together and cohere into something that was unified and had emotional weight. The same way that you hear two seconds of a song and you know who the artist is, they wanted to use that to mark each universe and have it feel like somebody's changing channels on a radio when you're moving through them. It's a lot of combining and building and things spinning out of control, and the noise of the uncertainty in the universe. There's an aspect of it that's just like the universe being the sum of its parts and then there's another aspect of it that's the feeling of remedy or overload that we as people have when we try to comprehend what the full multiverse is."

— Rafiq Bhatia, the band guitarist, in an interview to Rolling Stone, about scoring for Everything Everywhere All At Once

This film marked the band's fourth film as a composer, following The Disappearance of Eleanor Rigby (2014), Paper Towns (2015) and Mean Dreams (2016), but first as a 3-piece band (previous films were all composed when Son Lux consisted of only Lott). The band's lead guitarist Rafiq Bhatia had said that the creative process of scoring for a film was very different from that of their works in studio albums, as the difference is not serving another medium, or supporting what happening in the other medium, adding "Unlike scoring a film or, or creating music for dancers, or you know, any of the other kinds of collaborations that we might embark on with artists and other media, like making a record, all there is is the sound; the sound comes first." The band said that scoring for the film was similar to working on five different films merged into one.

=== Recording ===
The music production went on for two to three years. The band created the compositions while simultaneously working on Tomorrows, a trilogy of studio albums. More than 100 cues were created for the film. On the creation of the score and sound, Rafiq Bhatia said that each piece of music "would have its own kind of tone where, you can just tell from the sound, color and all that sort of stuff, right away that we're in this world." They had created short themes with melodic cues as "it was about finding instantly recognizable melodic ideas, and then contextualizing them instantly with either idiomatic genre, nodding instrumentation, or orchestration, or doing the exact opposite, positing them in a world of sound that feels very strange, very alien, or flirting between sound design and score, where the particular 'instruments' involved are not really recognizable instruments."

They also blended various instruments, including paigu, gongs, foil violin, and Mayan flutes made of cedar, which they referred as the "unrecognizable instruments". Son Lux made samples of the paigu in their own studio during the COVID-19 pandemic. They also sampled the tuned gongs and Chinese percussion instruments which were "chopped up and processed in different ways". Ryan Lott played a version of Claude Debussy's "Clair de Lune" using tuned gong.

They used temporary music from film and television as an inspiration for creating the soundtrack. Bhatia also referenced the score for The Matrix while creating the song "Plug Fight", crediting The Matrix's composer, Don Davis, for one of the characters as a reference point. They said the score for the first Matrix film was "absolutely brilliant" and helped them to find the "science-fiction palette for the film". Son Lux said that there were several "vision-specific music moments" including the use of "Clair de Lune" along with traditional Chinese music and opera.

=== Collaborations ===
The album featured collaborations from several renowned artists. André Benjamin, also known as André 3000 played flute for five tracks. The band liked his musical approach, and when they called Benjamin for the recording, he brought different kinds of flutes that had different registers, with some being double-sided so that the user might play two melodies simultaneously. They recalled the recording sessions being a "surreal and crazy thing" and claimed their score work akin to a "professional recordist playing on field". Randy Newman contributed for one of the tracks, "Now We're Cookin'". (Note: Randy Newman had voiced the character Raccaconnie, a reference for the Pixar-film Ratatouille (2007). That film was scored by Michael Giacchino.) The band said that Newman's inclusion was "the Daniels' dream", and Newman had watched and liked a rough cut of the film during the pandemic. David Byrne and Mitski contributed for two tracks, while Moses Sumney worked on the track "Fence". Son Lux's drummer, Ian Chang, had also played drums for Sumney on occasion. The band sent Sumney a sample of cues, and he chose one over which to write what would become "Fence". Actress Stephanie Hsu sang on the track "Sucked Into a Bagel".

== Reception ==
Professional ratings
Review scores
| Source | Rating |
|---|---|
| AllMusic | 4.5/5 stars |
| Pitchfork | 7.5/10 |
| Spectrum Culture | 80% |

Writing for music website Pitchfork, Annie Geng praised the soundtrack's range, stating: "The thrill of Son Lux's score is in its audacious range. As Everything Everywhere All At Once snaps between zaniness, hilarity, darkness, and hope, so too does its soundtrack. Despite running an hour and 54 minutes, the score doesn't lose coherence [...] Son Lux's broader artistic ethos are rooted in the imperative of creation, so sprawling in its possibilities as to span an entire multiverse." Spectrum Culture's Holly Hazelwood summarized her review stating: "Everything Everywhere All at Once is a movie of rare beauty and immense magic, and the fact that this soundtrack doesn't feel incomplete without the visual element is a testament to its quality. For those who have seen the film, though, diving into this soundtrack is a fantastic way to stay inside the film's expansive, hyperactive world for just a little longer. In the end, that's what the best soundtracks are supposed to do: help you hold onto the magic long after the credits have come and gone." Debby Das of The Harvard Crimson praised Son Lux as the "perfect choice to compose the film's jarringly primal soundtrack" and stated "Watching and listening to Everything Everywhere All at Once is the closest a viewer might get to being a kid in Willy Wonka's candy shop." AllMusics Marcy Donelson concluded her review of the soundtrack writing "Son Lux's part in Everything Everywhere All at Once may or may not have raised the game in scoring as much as the joyously absurdist film has defied limitations in storytelling, but at the very least, it's a brilliant pairing."

== Track listing ==
Everything Everywhere All at Once (Original Motion Picture Soundtrack)
| No. | Title | Writer(s) | Artist(s) | Length |
|---|---|---|---|---|
| 1. | "This Is a Life (Extended)" | Son Lux; Mitski; David Byrne | Son Lux; Mitski; Byrne | 3:35 |
| 2. | "Wang Family Portrait" | Son Lux | Son Lux | 1:47 |
| 3. | "Very Busy" | Son Lux | Son Lux | 5:09 |
| 4. | "Vvvery Busy" | Son Lux | Son Lux | 2:05 |
| 5. | "What Are You Thinking About?" | Son Lux | Son Lux | 2:02 |
| 6. | "What a Fast Elevator!" | Son Lux | Son Lux | 2:44 |
| 7. | "Switch Shoes to the Wrong Feet" | Son Lux | Son Lux | 1:46 |
| 8. | "Nothing Could Possibly Matter More" | Son Lux | Son Lux | 2:22 |
| 9. | "A Choice" | Son Lux | Son Lux | 1:42 |
| 10. | "Chapstick" | Son Lux | Son Lux | 1:49 |
| 11. | "The Fanny Pack" | Son Lux | Son Lux | 1:49 |
| 12. | "Jobu Tupaki" | Son Lux | Son Lux; Nina Moffitt | 2:03 |
| 13. | "The Alphaverse" | Son Lux | Son Lux | 1:53 |
| 14. | "The Mission" | Son Lux | Son Lux; Moffitt | 2:20 |
| 15. | "Deirdre Fight" | Son Lux | Son Lux | 5:02 |
| 16. | "Waymond Cries" | Son Lux | Son Lux | 0:37 |
| 17. | "I Love You Kung Fu" | Son Lux | Son Lux; Hanna Benn | 1:46 |
| 18. | "My Life Without You" | Son Lux; André Benjamin | Son Lux | 1:33 |
| 19. | "The Story of Jobu" | Son Lux | Son Lux; Moffitt | 1:14 |
| 20. | "Rendezvous at the Premiere" | Son Lux | Son Lux | 1:25 |
| 21. | "It's You... Juju Toobootie" | Chris Pattishall; Son Lux | Son Lux; Pattishall; Moffitt | 1:12 |
| 22. | "Everything Bagel" | Son Lux | Son Lux | 2:18 |
| 23. | "You're Living Your Worst You" | Son Lux | Son Lux | 2:27 |
| 24. | "The Boxcutter" | Son Lux | Son Lux; Benjamin | 2:20 |
| 25. | "Send Every Available Jumper" | Son Lux | Son Lux | 2:42 |
| 26. | "Opera Fight" | Son Lux | Son Lux; Surrija; yMusic | 2:17 |
| 27. | "Dog Fight" | Son Lux | Son Lux; Benjamin | 1:36 |
| 28. | "Drummer Fight" | Son Lux | Son Lux | 1:00 |
| 29. | "Plug Fight" | Son Lux | Son Lux | 2:34 |
| 30. | "Pinky Fight" | Son Lux | Son Lux; Benjamin | 1:14 |
| 31. | "I Have Been Watching" | Son Lux | Son Lux; Rob Moose; Moffitt | 1:38 |
| 32. | "Somewhere Out There in All That Noise" | Son Lux | Son Lux | 1:26 |
| 33. | "Jobu Sees All" | Son Lux | Son Lux | 2:05 |
| 34. | "The Temple" | Son Lux | Son Lux | 2:21 |
| 35. | "Evelyn Everywhere" | Son Lux | Son Lux | 3:28 |
| 36. | "Evelyn All at Once" | Son Lux | Son Lux | 2:29 |
| 37. | "This Is How I Fight" | Son Lux | Son Lux | 2:40 |
| 38. | "In Another Life" | Son Lux | Son Lux | 2:24 |
| 39. | "It All Just Goes Away" | Son Lux | Son Lux | 2:44 |
| 40. | "Clair de Lune (Pied au Piano)" | Claude Debussy | Son Lux; Pattishall | 1:38 |
| 41. | "Come Recover (Empathy Fight)" | Son Lux | Son Lux | 7:13 |
| 42. | "Your Day Will Come (Empathy Fight)" | Son Lux | Son Lux | 3:05 |
| 43. | "Let Me Go" | Son Lux | Son Lux | 2:01 |
| 44. | "Specks of Time" | Son Lux; Benjamin | Son Lux | 2:49 |
| 45. | "This Is a Life" | Son Lux; Mitski; Byrne | Son Lux; Mitski; Byrne | 2:41 |
| 46. | "Fence" | Son Lux; Moses Sumney | Son Lux; Sumney | 3:35 |
| 47. | "Now We're Cookin'" | Son Lux | Son Lux; Randy Newman; Harry Shum Jr. | 2:14 |
| 48. | "Sucked Into a Bagel" | Son Lux | Son Lux; Stephanie Hsu | 2:30 |
| 49. | "I Love You" | Son Lux | Son Lux; Benn | 0:38 |
| Total length: | | | | 114:02 |
