= Your Mother Your Mother Your Mother (soundtrack) =

2026 film soundtrack album

Your Mother Your Mother Your Mother (Original Motion Picture Soundtrack)

Film score by Son Lux
- Released: September 25, 2026
- Recorded: 2026
- Length: 42:58
- Label: Waxwork
- Producers: Rafiq Bhatia; Ian Chang; Ryan Lott

Son Lux chronology
Thunderbolts* (2025)	Your Mother Your Mother Your Mother (2026)

Singles from Your Mother Your Mother Your Mother
- 1. "Now I'm Listening" Released: August 18, 2026

Your Mother Your Mother Your Mother (Original Motion Picture Soundtrack) is the soundtrack album for the 2026 film Your Mother Your Mother Your Mother, directed by Bassam Tariq. The American post-rock trio Son Lux composed and produced the film score, which has 18 tracks. Waxwork Records released the album for digital distribution on September 25, 2026, with a vinyl release planned in December.

== Background ==
Son Lux scored the music for Your Mother Your Mother Your Mother who admitted that Tariq served inspiration for their compositions. The band member Ian Chang admitted that a big part of the Islamic faith is "there's this unknowable, ineffable feeling" which was important to Tariq, who discussed with them and wanted them to communicate that faith in a way that deals with the mystery and the majesty of the unknowable. Tariq's Islamic faith served as the reference point for the composers, as the score was varied and distinct, ranging from tender and beautiful to intense and violent, that led the band to explore a lot for the score.

Tariq also encouraged the band to utilize a vocal choir; according to Ryan Lott, the use of vocals led them to investigate the power of human voice both individually and collectively. The use of human vocals and choir helped the band to found the soul of the score and that helped to investigate the choir more aggressively. Son Lux further took inspiration from Sufi Zikr chants that Tariq sent to them. Besides that the band members also provided vocals to the score, repeating the chants and phrases. It was the first instance in a film, where all the three band members provided vocals for a film collaboratively.

Rafiq Bhatia referenced through Islamic artwork and architecture, where the chants had an infinite geometry of the patterns that repeat endlessly to express the inexpressible and to communicate infinity. He referenced on "la ilaha" (transl. there is no god) and "la ilaha il" (transl. there is no god but) where that pattern being repeated infinitely provided "an expression of doubt made infinite being actually an own expression of the infinite and the unknowable."

== Release ==
The original song "Now I'm Listening" was performed by Son Lux and Islamic-American singer Bilal. It was released as a single on August 18, 2026. The original score was released through Waxwork Records on September 25 in digital formats and well as in physical CDs and LPs.

== Reception ==
Aaron Badgley of The Spill Magazine wrote "Your Mother Your Mother Your Mother Original Motion Picture Soundtrack is not so much a relaxing listening experience, but it is interesting and features so many sounds and textures that it keeps the listener's interest throughout. Two albums from Son Lux in one month may seem excessive, but both are very different and both are quite brilliant." Michael La Torre of Alt Revue wrote "The score is mainly instrumental, but does feature some vocalization spots throughout [...] The band uses a myriad of instrumentation throughout the effort, but the hero of the day for me had to be the percussion work. It pushes a sense of urgency in all the right places which stressed the dramatic nature and suspense which is sure to be in the film."

Brian Tallerico of RogerEbert.com called it "a truly incredible score from Son Lux that blends cultural rhythms with something electronically haunting." Robert Daniels of Screen International called it a "expressive score, [which] oscillat[es] between surreal wonder and abstract intensity". Siddhant Adlakha of IGN called it a "bouncy, intense score". Elizabeth Weitzman of Time Out called it an "eerily solemn score". Tim Grierson of Los Angeles Times described it as an "anxiety-inducing electronic score".

== Track listing ==
All tracks are written by Rafiq Bhatia, Ian Chang, and Ryan Lott.

Your Mother Your Mother Your Mother (Original Soundtrack) track listing
No.	Title	Length
1.	"Who Is Most Beloved?"	1:34
2.	"Your Mother"	2:27
3.	"Under Control"	2:51
4.	"Breaking"	3:32
5.	"Hatty"	2:23
6.	"Milk"	2:58
7.	"Strip Club Church"	2:50
8.	"Walk to Pak's"	1:18
9.	"Spilled Milk"	3:25
10.	"Leaving Home"	3:15
11.	"Like Nothing Happened"	0:52
12.	"They Were Here For Me"	1:14
13.	"Grace"	2:01
14.	"Mercy"	2:43
15.	"Your Mother Your Mother Your Mother"	3:22
16.	"The Way Back"	1:14
17.	"Now I'm Listening" (with Bilal)	2:56
18.	"Zikr"	2:03
Total length:		42:58

== Personnel ==
These credits are adapted from Tidal.

=== Son Lux ===
- Rafiq Bhatia – production (all tracks), choir arrangement (tracks 1, 2, 10, 14–16), guitar (2, 4–7, 9, 13–15); electronics, synthesizer (4, 9, 13, 14); vocals (5, 7, 9, 14, 17, 18)
- Ian Chang – production (all tracks); electronics, synthesizer (3–10, 12, 14, 16, 18); programming (3–9, 14, 18), vocals (3–5, 7, 8, 12, 14, 16, 18), drums (5, 6), choir arrangement (14)
- Ryan Lott – production (all tracks); electronics, synthesizer (1, 2, 4–6, 9, 11, 13–17); vocals (1, 4, 6, 9, 11, 13–15, 17); choir arrangement, programming (2, 15); piano (6, 9)

=== Additional contributors ===
- Nate Odden – engineering
- Angie Teo – vocal engineering
- Satoshi Noguchi – mixing
- JD Tiner – mixing assistance
- Dave Kutch – mastering
- Keir Schmidt – production assistance
- Jonathan Zalben – post-production editing
- Mah Moud – vocals (1–4, 8, 9, 14)
- Nina Moffitt – choir vocals, choir arrangement (1, 2, 6, 9, 14, 15, 16); vocals (4, 17)
- Brayla Cook – choir vocals (1, 2, 6, 9, 14, 15, 16)
- Dani Murcia – choir vocals (1, 2, 6, 9, 14, 15, 16)
- Jehbreal Muhammad Jackson – choir vocals (1, 2, 6, 9, 14, 15, 16)
- Kristin Slipp – choir vocals (1, 2, 6, 9, 14, 15, 16)
- Nio Levon – choir vocals (1, 2, 6, 9, 14, 15, 16)
- Schadrack Pierre – choir vocals (1, 2, 6, 9, 14, 15, 16)
- Tajahniya Sapp – choir vocals (1, 2, 6, 9, 14, 15, 16)
- Bilal – vocals (17)

== Accolades ==
Award	Date of ceremony	Category	Nominee(s)	Result	Ref.
Hollywood Music in Media Awards	November 18, 2026	Best Original Score – Feature Film	Son Lux	Pending	
