= At War with Walls & Mazes =

Studio album by Son Lux
- Released: March 11, 2008
- Genre: Post-rock
- Length: 44:17
- Label: Anticon
- Producer: Ryan Lott

Son Lux chronology
At War with Walls & Mazes (2008)	We Are Rising (2011)

Professional ratings
Review scores
Source	Rating
AllMusic	3/5 stars
Pitchfork	7.0/10
PopMatters	6/10 stars
The Skinny	4/5 stars
Sputnikmusic	4.5/5
XLR8R	6/10

At War with Walls & Mazes is the debut studio album by Ryan Lott under the Son Lux moniker. It was released through Anticon on March 11, 2008.

== Critical reception ==
Mehan Jayasuriya of PopMatters gave the album 6 stars out of 10, calling it "a dense, meticulously crafted haze of Baroque instrumentation, electronic pulses and hip-hop beats." Matt Gollock of The Skinny gave the album 4 stars out of 5, saying: "This album's a slow burner that'll take a few repeated plays to really hatch, but it's another in a long line of truly innovative records from a rare gem of a label."

Andy Whitman of Paste named it the 2nd best album of 2008.

== Track listing ==
All tracks are written by Ryan Lott.

No.	Title	Length
1.	"Prologue"	0:29
2.	"Break"	3:11
3.	"Weapons"	5:01
4.	"Betray"	5:05
5.	"Stay"	3:47
6.	"Raise"	5:41
7.	"Tell"	3:52
8.	"Wither"	4:02
9.	"Stand"	5:33
10.	"War"	4:35
11.	"Epilogue"	3:05

== Personnel ==
Credits adapted from liner notes.

- Ryan Lott – production, performance, mixing
- Matthew DeRubertis – bass guitar (4, 6)
- Katie Kikel – flute (4)
- Steven Temme – saxophone (5, 6)
- Eric Stephenson – cello (5)
- Judson Crane – string arrangement (5)
- Doc Harrill – mixing
- Mike Wells – mastering
- Joshue Ott – artwork
- Sam Flax Keener – layout
