= Son Lux =

American experimental music project

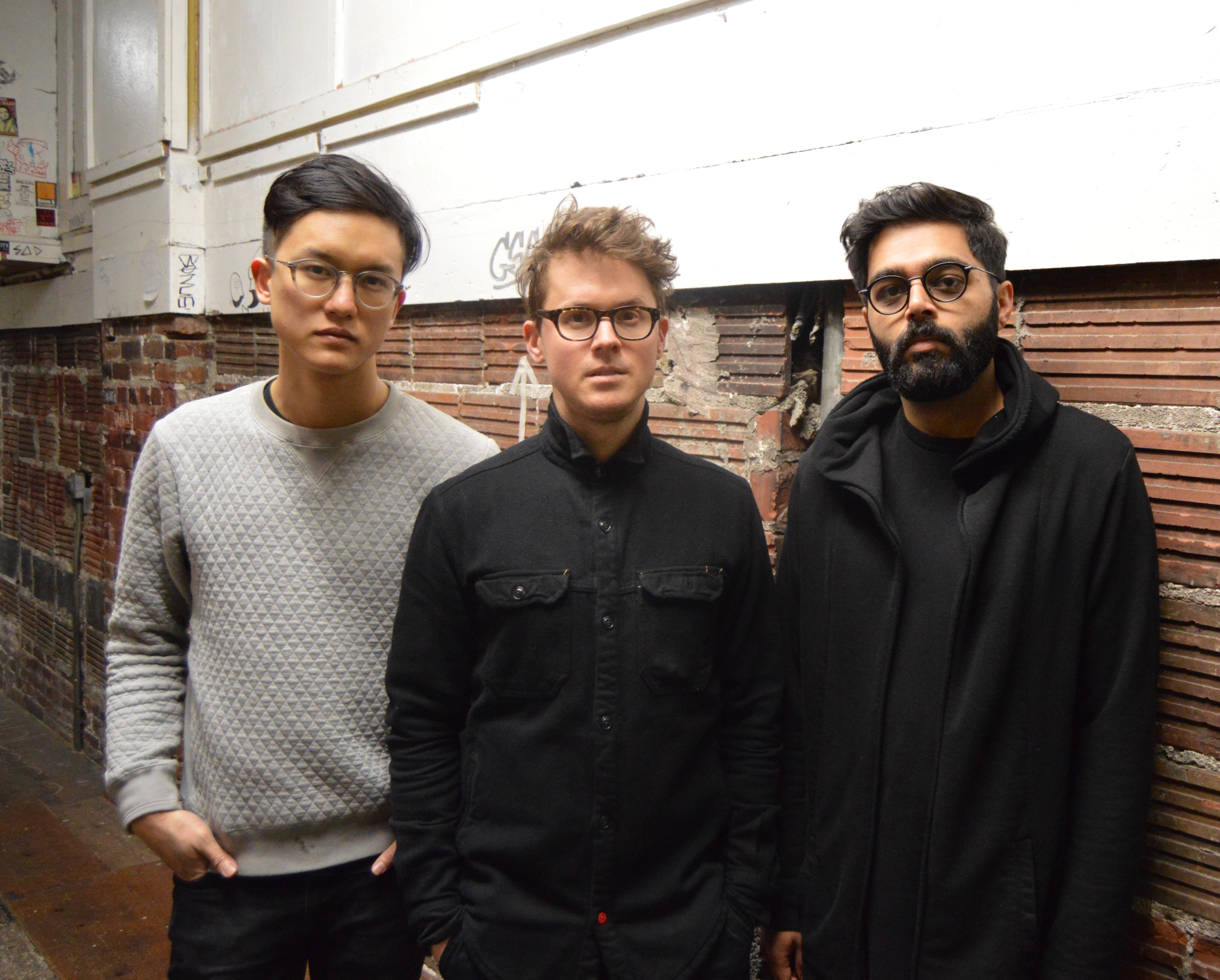
- Son Lux in 2016. From left to right: Ian Chang, Ryan Lott and Rafiq Bhatia.

Background information
- Origin: New York, U.S.
- Genres: Experimental rock; post-rock; electronic rock
- Years active: 2008–present
- Labels: City Slang; Glassnote, Joyful Noise; Anticon
- Members: Ryan Lott; Rafiq Bhatia; Ian Chang
- Website: sonluxmusic.com

Son Lux is an American post-rock band. Originally the solo project and moniker of founding member Ryan Lott, the band's first three albums, At War with Walls & Mazes, We Are Rising and Lanterns, shaped the band's unique sound through post-rock and electronica influences.

With the release of their fourth studio album, Bones, in 2015, Rafiq Bhatia and Ian Chang joined Son Lux, transforming the project into a three-piece band. After the release of their EPs Stranger Forms and Remedy, the band's fifth album, Brighter Wounds, was released in February 2018. A triple album called Tomorrows, released in three ten-track parts, followed in 2020 and 2021. The band composed the music for the 2022 science fiction action film Everything Everywhere All at Once, which received a nomination for the Academy Award for Best Original Score at the 95th Academy Awards, and the 2025 superhero film Thunderbolts*.

== History ==
Son Lux started in 2007 as the moniker and solo recording project of American musician and composer Ryan Lott. His debut studio album, At War with Walls & Mazes, was released in March of that same year. Following this release, NPR named Son Lux "Best New Artist" on their program All Songs Considered.

Lott then released his second album, We Are Rising, on May 17, 2011, recorded in the entire month of February for the RPM Challenge. Adam Kivel, writing for Consequence of Sound, described the album as "the dark, operatic middle ground between Owen Pallett and In Rainbows-era Radiohead or Wild Beasts' fantastic, operatic heights."

Son Lux signed with Joyful Noise Recordings in May 2013, the same month that his "haunting rendition" of "Black Waters" was featured in the eponymous flexi-disc series released by Joyful Noise. After the announcement of Lott joining Joyful Noise, the project released "TEAR", a conceptual 7" featuring one new song in two distinct parts. Lanterns was then released on October 29, 2013. It includes vocals from then label-mate Stranger Cat, the musical project of Cat Martino. The lead single "Lost It To Trying" was named one of Pitchfork's Best New Tracks.

In 2014, Son Lux released the extended play Alternate Worlds, which contained re-imagined songs from Lanterns, including a version of "Easy" with vocal contributions from Lorde. Later in 2014, Glassnote announced that they had signed Son Lux worldwide. Additionally, Lott composed the score and soundtrack for the 2014 film The Disappearance of Eleanor Rigby.

In 2015, Lott was featured on The Art Assignment in a project that invites viewers to work collaboratively around music that he wrote for the program.

Son Lux's fourth album, Bones, was released on June 23, 2015. With the release of the album, the project transformed into a trio when touring members Rafiq Bhatia and Ian Chang joined Lott as members of the band.

On July 15, 2016, Son Lux appeared on stage at the Montreux Jazz Festival as a guest of Woodkid at the "Woodkid and Friends" evening.

On April 7, 2017, the band released the song "Dangerous", simultaneously announcing the song as the lead single from their fourth EP, Remedy, which was released on May 12. On December 15, 2017, a song titled "Eazy" by hip-hop artist G-Eazy was released featuring sampled audio from "Easy".

Son Lux released their fifth album, Brighter Wounds, on February 9, 2018, on their new record label, City Slang. The album received a review of 7.3 out of 10 points on Pitchfork.

On April 5, 2019, Son Lux released a box set with one of their earlier labels, Joyful Noise Recordings, that has two reissued early albums and a new album of unreleased recordings, Remnants. In May 2020, the collection entitled Reincarnates was released. This collection, much like Remnants consisted of previously unheard or rare tracks, including three reworkings of "Change is Everything" from the Bones album, and a new version of "Remedy" (entitled "Remedy, Surging Sea", and included a crowd-sourced choir of over 300 voices).

In 2020, the song "Dream State" appeared in Season 1 of the HBO series The Vow. Also appearing in this season were the songs "Lanterns Lit," and "Change Is Everything." "Dream State" was also featured in 2022 in Season 2 of the series.

In February 2021, Son Lux announced that their next album, Tomorrows III, would be released on April 16, 2021, and was scheduled to be the final album in the Tomorrows trilogy.

In 2022, the band composed the musical score for the film Everything Everywhere All At Once. The 49-track soundtrack released on April 8, 2022, and includes collaborations with Mitski, David Byrne, a flute-playing André 3000, Randy Newman, Moses Sumney, and yMusic, plus others. The score was nominated for Best Original Score at the 95th Academy Awards, where it lost to Volker Bertelmann's score for All Quiet on the Western Front.

In 2024, Son Lux, in collaboration with the Bluecoats, announced a 2-year musical partnership including the use of three Son Lux titles in the 2024 competitive Drum Corps International season, and new music composed for use in Summer 2025.

In 2025, the band composed the musical score for the Marvel Cinematic Universe film Thunderbolts*, with the soundtrack releasing on April 30, 2025.

In May 2026, the band released "Endlessly" as the lead single for their album Out Into. The album is scheduled to release on September 18, 2026.

== Members ==
- Ryan Lott – producer, composer, keyboards, vocals (2008–present)
- Rafiq Bhatia – guitars, producer, composer (2015–present; touring 2013–2015)
- Ian Chang – drums, producer, composer (2015–present; touring 2013–2015)

== Filmography ==
Year	Title	Director	Studio(s)
2011	The Disappearance of Eleanor Rigby	Ned Benson	Division Films / Dreambridge Films / Myriad Pictures / Unison Films
2016	Mean Dreams	Nathan Morlando	Woods Entertainment
2021	Rolls-Royce: Younger	Alexander N	N Films
2021	+ (Dix)	Vikram Dasgupta	Pixel Palette
2022	Everything Everywhere All at Once	Daniel Kwan and Daniel Scheinert	A24 / IAC Films / AGBO / Year of the Rat / Ley Line Entertainment
2025	Thunderbolts*	Jake Schreier	Marvel Studios
2026	Your Mother Your Mother Your Mother	Bassam Tariq	Amazon MGM Studios / Orion Pictures / Two & Two Pictures

== Discography ==
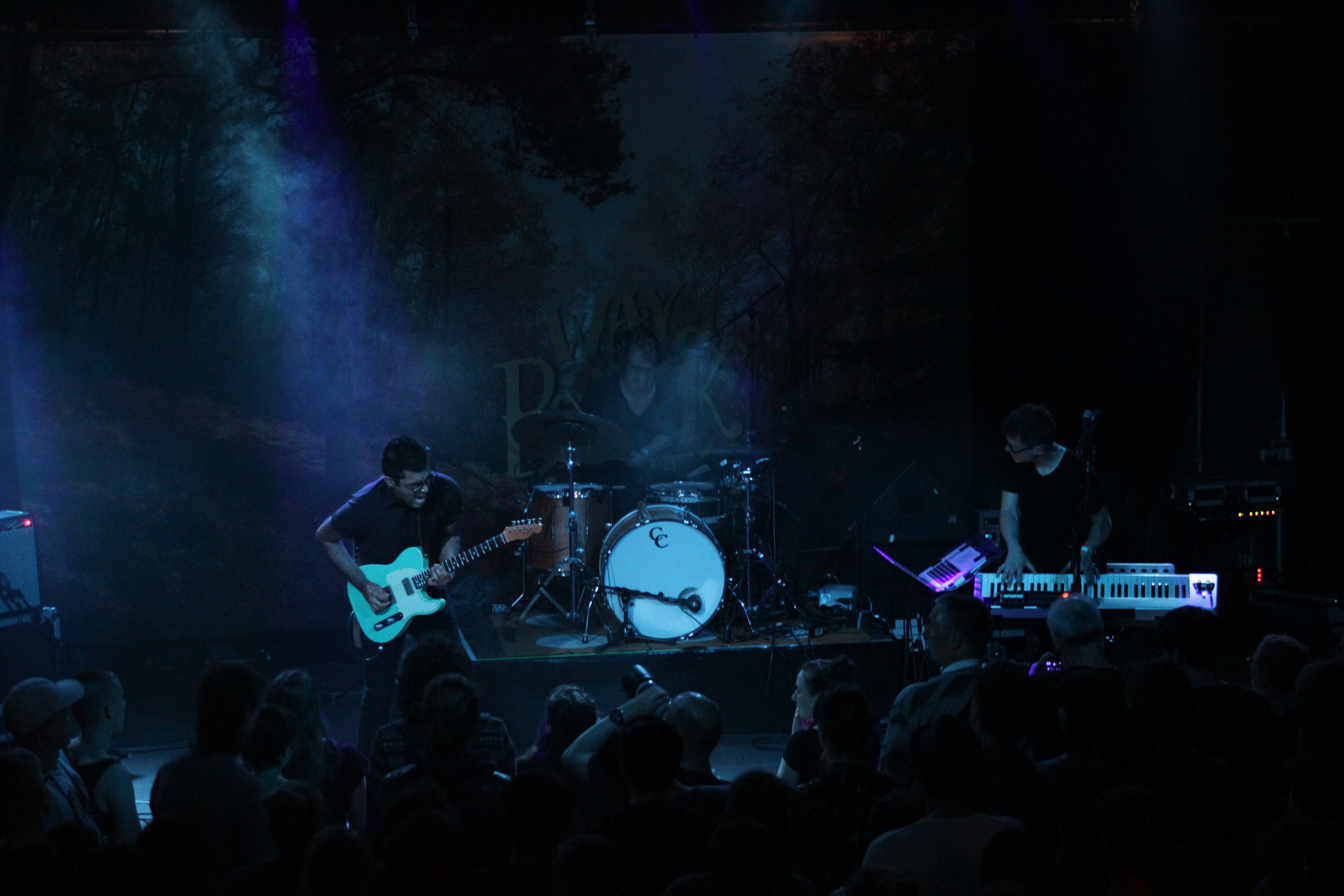
Son Lux playing in 2014 at the "Way Back When Festival" in Dortmund, Germany

=== Studio albums ===
- At War with Walls & Mazes (Anticon, 2008)
- We Are Rising (Anticon, 2011)
- Lanterns (Joyful Noise, 2013)
- Bones (Glassnote, 2015)
- Brighter Wounds (City Slang, 2018)
- Tomorrows I-III (City Slang, 2020/2021)
- Out Into (City Slang and This Is Meru, 2026)

=== Soundtrack albums ===
- Everything Everywhere All at Once (A24, 2022)
- Thunderbolts* (Hollywood and Marvel Music, 2025)
- Your Mother Your Mother Your Mother (Waxwork Records, 2026)

=== EPs ===
- Weapons (Anticon, 2010)
- Alternate Worlds (Joyful Noise, 2014)
- Stranger Forms (Joyful Noise, 2016)
- Remedy (Joyful Noise, 2017)
- Dream State (City Slang, 2018)
- The Fool You Need (City Slang, 2018)
- Yesterday's Wake (City Slang, 2018)
- Labor (City Slang, 2019)
- Tomorrows Reworks (2021)
- Risk of Make Believe (2025)

=== Compilations ===
- Remnants (Joyful Noise, 2019)
- Reincarnates (2020, a collection of previously unheard or rare tracks)
- Alternate Forms (Joyful Noise, 2023)

=== Other ===
- Tear (7", Joyful Noise Recordings 2013)
- Black Waters (flexi-disc series, Joyful Noise Recordings 2013. Black Waters is based on a tune of the same name by American folk singer Jean Ritchie)
- Winter Spring Summer Fall 2014, is a mixtape released by Boots, which featured Son Lux on the track "Troubled World"

=== Music videos ===
- "Break" (2008)
- "Stay" (2008)
- "Wither" (2009)
- "War" (2009)
- "Weapons VII" (2010)
- "Lost it to Trying" (2013)
- "Alternate World" (2014)
- "Lanterns Lit" (2014)
- "Lost it to Trying (Mouths Only Lying)" (2014)
- "Easy" (2014)
- "Change is Everything" (2015)
- "You Don't Know Me" (2015)
- "You Don't Know Me (Jailo Remix)" (2015)
- "Undone" (2016)
- "Cage of Bones" (2016)
- "Breathe Out" (2016)
- "Dangerous" (2017)
- "Ransom" (2017)
- "Slowly" (2018)
- "All Directions" (2018)
- "The Fool You Need" (2018)
- "Yesterday's Wake" (2018)
- "A Different Kind of Love" (2021)
- "Plans We Made" (2022)
- "Undertow" (2022)
- "In Death We've Just Begun (ft. Poppy and Son Lux)" (2026)
