= Thunderbolts* (soundtrack) =

Thunderbolts* (Original Motion Picture Soundtrack)

Film score by Son Lux
- Released: April 30, 2025 (digital)
- Recorded: 2025
- Venue: London
- Studio: Abbey Road Studios
- Genre: Film score
- Length: 53:51
- Labels: Hollywood; Marvel Music

Son Lux chronology
Everything Everywhere All at Once (2022)	Thunderbolts* (Original Motion Picture Soundtrack) (2025)	Your Mother Your Mother Your Mother (2026)

Thunderbolts* (Original Motion Picture Soundtrack) is the film score for the Marvel Studios film Thunderbolts*. The score was composed by Son Lux. Hollywood Records released the album digitally on April 30, 2025.

== Background ==
The band Son Lux began recording the score for Thunderbolts* at Abbey Road Studios in London in the first week of February 2025, after member Ryan Lott previously scored Jake Schreier's film Paper Towns (2015). The soundtrack album was released digitally by Hollywood Records and Marvel Music on April 30, 2025.

== Track listing ==
All music composed by Son Lux.

Thunderbolts* (Original Motion Picture Soundtrack)
No.	Title	Length
1.	"There's Something Wrong with Me"	1:32
2.	"I Needed That Face"	0:43
3.	"The Light Inside You Is Dim"	1:22
4.	"Last Assignment"	1:46
5.	"I'm Not Here for You"	2:41
6.	"Countdown"	2:22
7.	"Forest Memory"	1:06
8.	"The Climb"	1:46
9.	"Walker's Memory"	1:01
10.	"Preparing for Lethal"	2:07
11.	"Every Man for Himself"	1:00
12.	"Maybe We'll All Get Out of Here Alive"	2:00
13.	"First Flight"	1:25
14.	"Limo Chase"	2:04
15.	"It's Bucky!"	1:16
16.	"Welcome to the Watchtower" ( (Note: This track references Alan Silvestri's theme from The Avengers.))	1:03
17.	"To Be Chosen"	1:31
18.	"For the Glory"	0:50
19.	"Left the Door Unlocked"	0:57
20.	"Introducing Sentry"	0:44
21.	"Unimpeachable"	1:17
22.	"Penthouse Fight"	1:22
23.	"It's Not Robert You Need to Be Afraid Of"	1:19
24.	"I Don't See Your Mistakes"	1:34
25.	"No Use Fighting"	3:06
26.	"Yelena's Choice"	1:53
27.	"Searching for Bob"	1:58
28.	"The Attic"	1:23
29.	"Show Us the Worst"	1:29
30.	"You Can't Even Save Yourself"	2:57
31.	"Not Alone"	2:50
32.	"Thunderbolts*"	3:27
Total length:		53:51
