= We Are Rising =

Studio album by Son Lux
- Released: June 28, 2011
- Recorded: February 2011
- Genre: Post-rock
- Length: 35:22
- Label: Anticon
- Producer: Ryan Lott

Son Lux chronology
At War with Walls & Mazes (2008)	We Are Rising (2011)	Lanterns (2013)

Professional ratings
Review scores
Source	Rating
AllMusic	4/5 stars
Christian Today	4/5 stars
Consequence of Sound	B
Dusted Magazine	favorable
Spectrum Culture	3.7/5
Under the Radar	7/10 stars

We Are Rising is the second studio album by Ryan Lott under the Son Lux moniker. It was released through Anticon on June 28, 2011. The album was created as the RPM Challenge in February 2011.

== Critical reception ==
Gregory Heaney of AllMusic gave the album 4 stars out of 5, stating that the most impressive thing about the album is "its seemingly effortless flow as it drifts from track to track, intuitively guiding listeners through its eerie sonic depths before gently depositing them at the end." Adam Kivel of Consequence of Sound gave the album a grade of B, calling it "a fully-fleshed, well-orchestrated electronic album."

== Track listing ==
All tracks are written by Ryan Lott.

No.	Title	Length
1.	"Flickers"	4:56
2.	"All the Right Things"	3:52
3.	"Rising"	4:30
4.	"Leave the Riches"	4:49
5.	"Flowers"	2:55
6.	"Chase"	3:01
7.	"Claws"	4:07
8.	"Let Go"	3:22
9.	"Rebuild"	3:55

== Personnel ==
Credits adapted from liner notes.

- Ryan Lott – performance, recording, mixing
- Rob Moose – acoustic guitar, violin
- Nadia Sirota – viola
- Clarice Jensen – cello
- Alex Sopp – flute, piccolo
- Hideaki Aomori – clarinet
- CJ Camerieri – trumpet
- Steven Temme – saxophone
- Judson Crane – celesta
- Ryan Fitch – drums
- Darren King – percussion
- McKenzie Smith – percussion
- DM Stith – vocals
- Katie Chastain – vocals
- Peter Silberman – vocals
- Jace Everett – vocals
- Shara Worden – vocals
- John McCaig – mastering
- Marke Johnson – art direction, design, photography
- Nathan Johnson – art direction, design, photography
- Brenden Beecy – portrait photography
