= Everything Everywhere All at Once =

2022 film by Daniel Kwan and Daniel Scheinert

- Theatrical release poster
- Directed by: Daniel Kwan; Daniel Scheinert
- Written by: Daniel Kwan; Daniel Scheinert
- Produced by: Joe Russo Anthony Russo; Mike Larocca; Daniel Kwan; Daniel Scheinert; Jonathan Wang
- Starring: Michelle Yeoh; Stephanie Hsu; Ke Huy Quan; James Hong; Jamie Lee Curtis
- Cinematography: Larkin Seiple
- Edited by: Paul Rogers
- Music by: Son Lux
- Production companies: A24; Gozie AGBO; Ley Line Entertainment; Year of the Rat; IAC Films
- Distributed by: A24
- Release dates: March 11, 2022 (SXSW); March 25, 2022 (United States)
- Running time: 139 minutes
- Country: United States
- Languages: English; Mandarin; Cantonese
- Budget: $14–25 million
- Box office: $143.4 million

Everything Everywhere All at Once (Note: Commonly abbreviated as EEAaO) is a 2022 American absurdist comedy-drama film written and directed by Daniel Kwan and Daniel Scheinert (collectively known as Daniels) who produced it with Anthony and Joe Russo and Jonathan Wang. The film incorporates media from several genres, including surreal comedy, science fiction, fantasy, martial arts films, and immigrant narrative. Michelle Yeoh stars as Evelyn Quan Wang, a Chinese-American immigrant who, while being audited by the IRS, discovers that she must connect with parallel universe versions of herself to prevent a powerful being from destroying the multiverse. The independent film also stars Stephanie Hsu, Ke Huy Quan, James Hong, and Jamie Lee Curtis.

Kwan and Scheinert began work on the project in 2010, and began writing the film's script in 2016. Production was announced in 2018, and principal photography ran from January to March 2020. The works of Hong Kong film director Wong Kar-wai, as well as the children's book Sylvester and the Magic Pebble and the video game Everything, served as inspiration for several scenes. Also inspired by contemporary scholars such as philosopher Mary-Jane Rubenstein, the film explores philosophical themes such as existentialism, nihilism, surrealism, and absurdism, as well as themes such as neurodivergence, depression, generational trauma, and Asian American identity. Its soundtrack features compositions by Son Lux, and collaborations with Mitski, David Byrne, André 3000, John Hampson, and Randy Newman.

Everything Everywhere All at Once premiered at South by Southwest on March 11, 2022, and began a limited theatrical release in the United States on March 25, before a wide release by A24 on April 8. It grossed $143 million against a $14–25 million budget. The film garnered widespread acclaim from critics and received numerous accolades. At the 95th Academy Awards, it won seven out of the eleven awards it was nominated for: Best Picture, Best Actress (Yeoh), Best Supporting Actor (Quan), Best Supporting Actress (Curtis), Best Director and Best Original Screenplay for Kwan and Scheinert, and Best Editing. The film also won two Golden Globe Awards, five Critics' Choice Awards (including Best Picture), a BAFTA Award, and a record four SAG Awards (including Best Ensemble).

== Plot ==
Evelyn Quan Wang is a middle-aged Chinese immigrant who runs a laundromat with her husband Waymond in Simi Valley, California. Two decades earlier, they eloped to the United States and had a daughter, Joy. In the present day, Evelyn struggles to manage the failing laundromat while navigating an impending Internal Revenue Service (IRS) audit. As pressures mount from both her personal life and the demands of assimilation in the United States, Evelyn finds herself overwhelmed by the expectations placed upon her. Waymond is attempting to serve her with divorce papers in an effort to spark a discussion about their marriage; her rigorous father (referred to as Gong Gong, Cantonese for grandfather) is increasingly irritable with Evelyn and her life; and she has a strained relationship with Joy, who is battling depression and has a non-Chinese girlfriend, Becky, whom Evelyn is reluctant to accept.

At a tense meeting with IRS Revenue Agent Deirdre Beaubeirdre, Waymond's body is taken over by Alpha-Waymond, a version of Waymond from the "Alphaverse." Alpha-Waymond explains to Evelyn that many parallel universes exist (the "multiverse") because every life choice creates a new alternative universe. In the Alphaverse, the now-deceased Alpha-Evelyn developed "verse-jumping" technology, which enables people to access the skills, memories, and bodies of their parallel selves by performing bizarre, statistically unlikely actions. The multiverse is threatened by Jobu Tupaki, the Alpha-Joy whose mind was splintered after Alpha-Evelyn pushed her to verse-jump beyond her endurance. Jobu experiences all universes at once and can verse-jump and manipulate reality at will. Jobu has created a black hole-like "Everything Bagel" that forms a toroid singularity that could destroy the multiverse.

Evelyn is provided verse-jumping technology to fight Jobu's minions, who are converging on the IRS building. She uncovers other universes in which she made different choices and flourished, such as becoming a kung fu master and film star. She also learns that Waymond intends to file for divorce. Alpha-Waymond believes that Evelyn, as the greatest "failure" of all Evelyns in the multiverse, possesses the untapped potential needed to defeat Jobu. Gong Gong is taken over by Alpha-Gong Gong, who instructs Evelyn to kill Joy to prevent Jobu from using her to access Evelyn's universe. Evelyn refuses and decides to face Jobu by acquiring powers through repeated verse-jumping. Alpha-Gong Gong, convinced that Evelyn's mind has been compromised like Jobu's, sends soldiers after Evelyn. While they fight, Jobu locates and kills Alpha-Waymond in the Alphaverse. As Jobu confronts Evelyn in her universe, Evelyn's mind begins to splinter, causing her to collapse.

Evelyn uncontrollably verse-jumps alongside Jobu across many bizarre and diverse universes. Jobu discloses she does not intend to fight, but that instead, she has been searching for an Evelyn who can see, as she does, that nothing matters. She teleports Evelyn to the Everything Bagel, divulging that she wants to use it to allow herself and Evelyn to truly die. Upon looking into the Bagel, Evelyn is initially persuaded, and behaves cruelly and nihilistically in her other universes, hurting those around her.

Just as Evelyn enters the Bagel with Jobu, she pauses to listen to Waymond's pleas in her home universe for everybody to stop fighting and to instead practice kindness, even when life is senseless. Evelyn has an existentialist epiphany and decides to follow Waymond's absurdist and humanitarian advice, utilizing her multiverse powers to fight with empathy and bring happiness to those around her. In doing so, she repairs her damage in the other universes and neutralizes Alpha-Gong Gong and Jobu's fighters. In her home universe, Evelyn reconciles with Waymond, accepts Joy and Becky's relationship and divulges it to Gong Gong, while Waymond convinces Deirdre to let them redo their taxes. Jobu decides to enter the Bagel alone as, simultaneously in Evelyn's universe, Joy pleads with Evelyn to let her go. Evelyn tells Joy that even when nothing makes sense and even though she could be anywhere else in the multiverse, she will always want to be with Joy. Evelyn and the others save Jobu from the Bagel, and Evelyn and Joy embrace.

Sometime later, with the family's relationships improved, they return to the IRS building to refile their taxes. As Deirdre talks, Evelyn's attention is momentarily drawn to her alternative selves, before she grounds herself back in her home universe.

== Cast ==
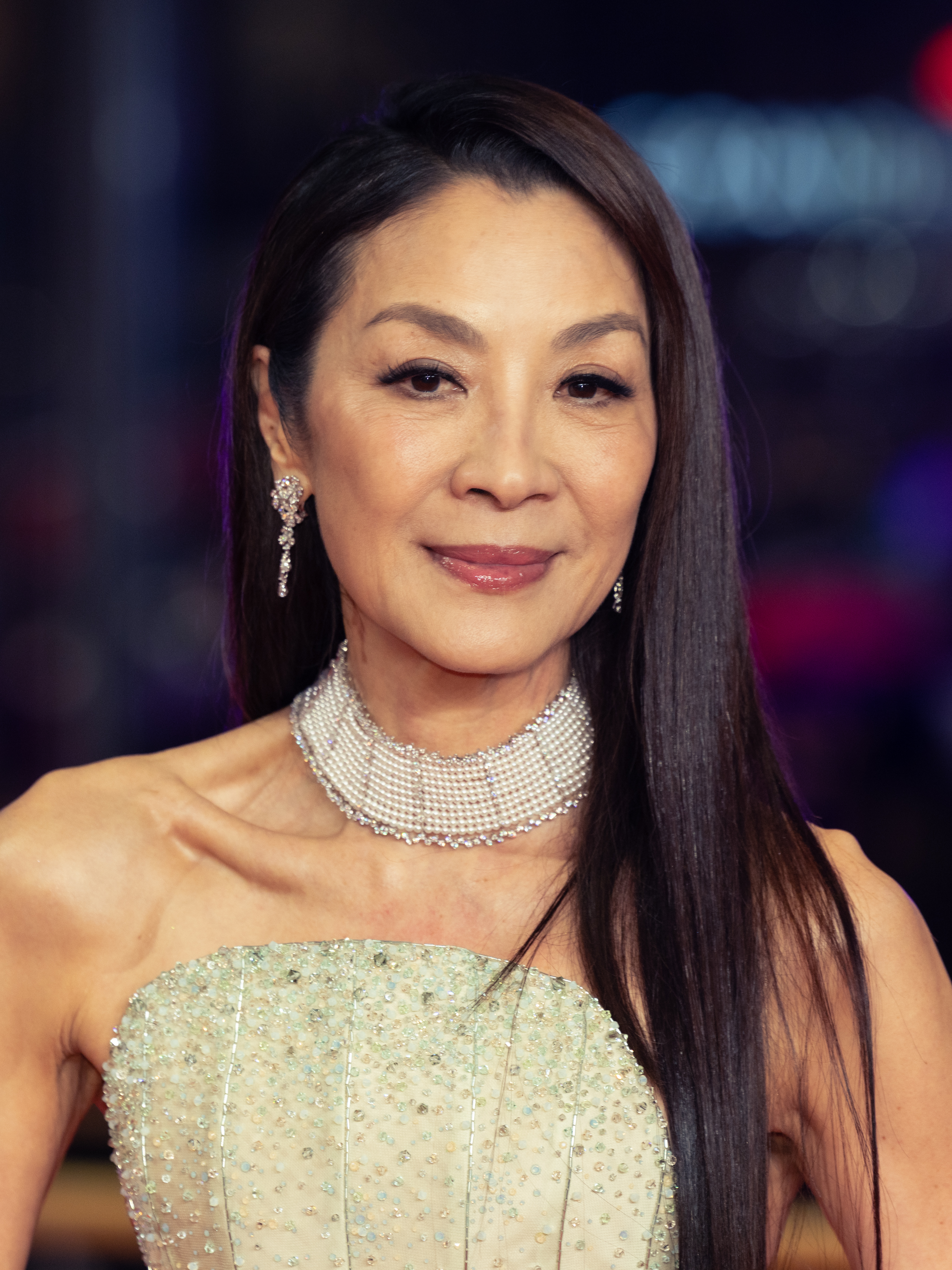
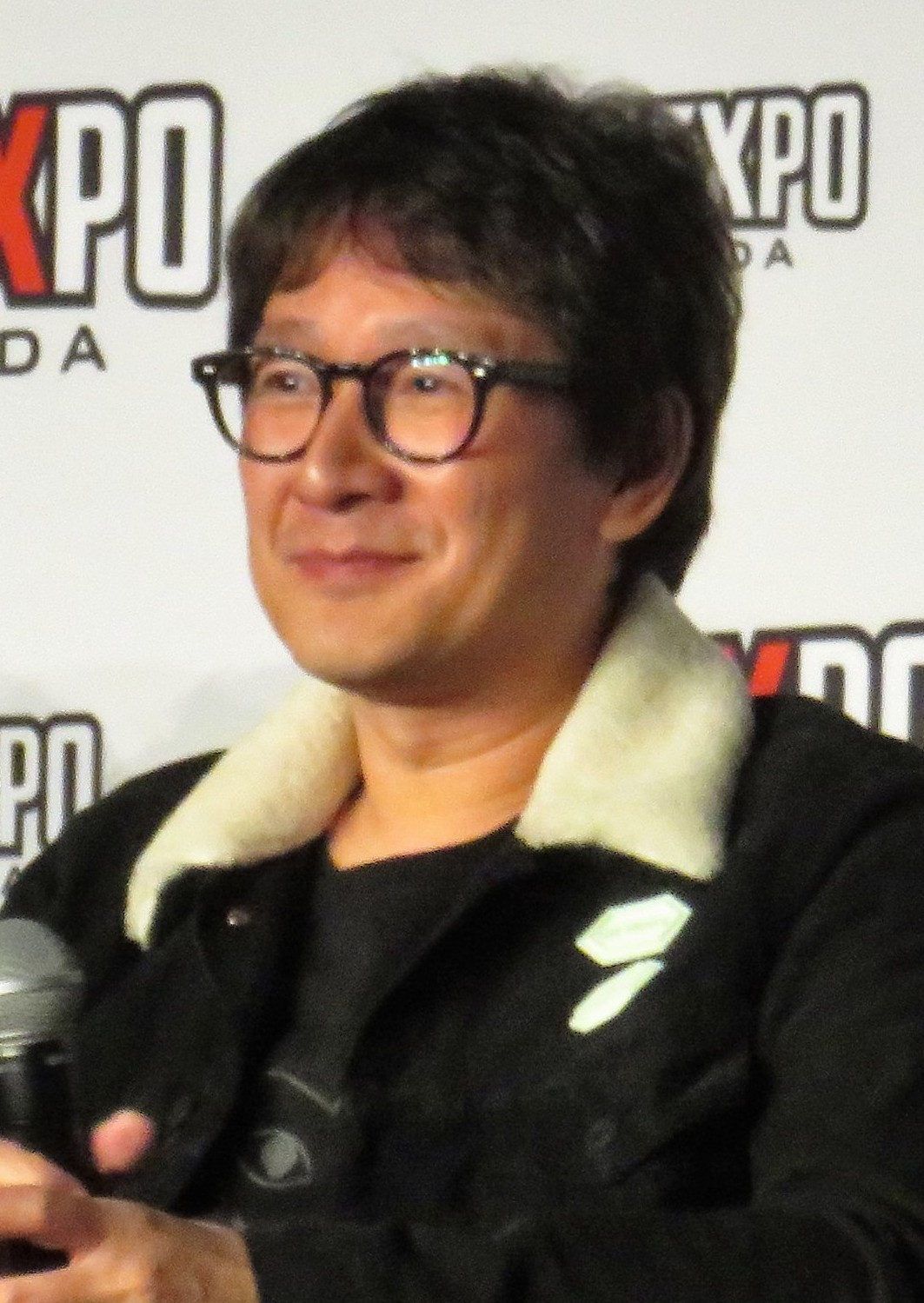
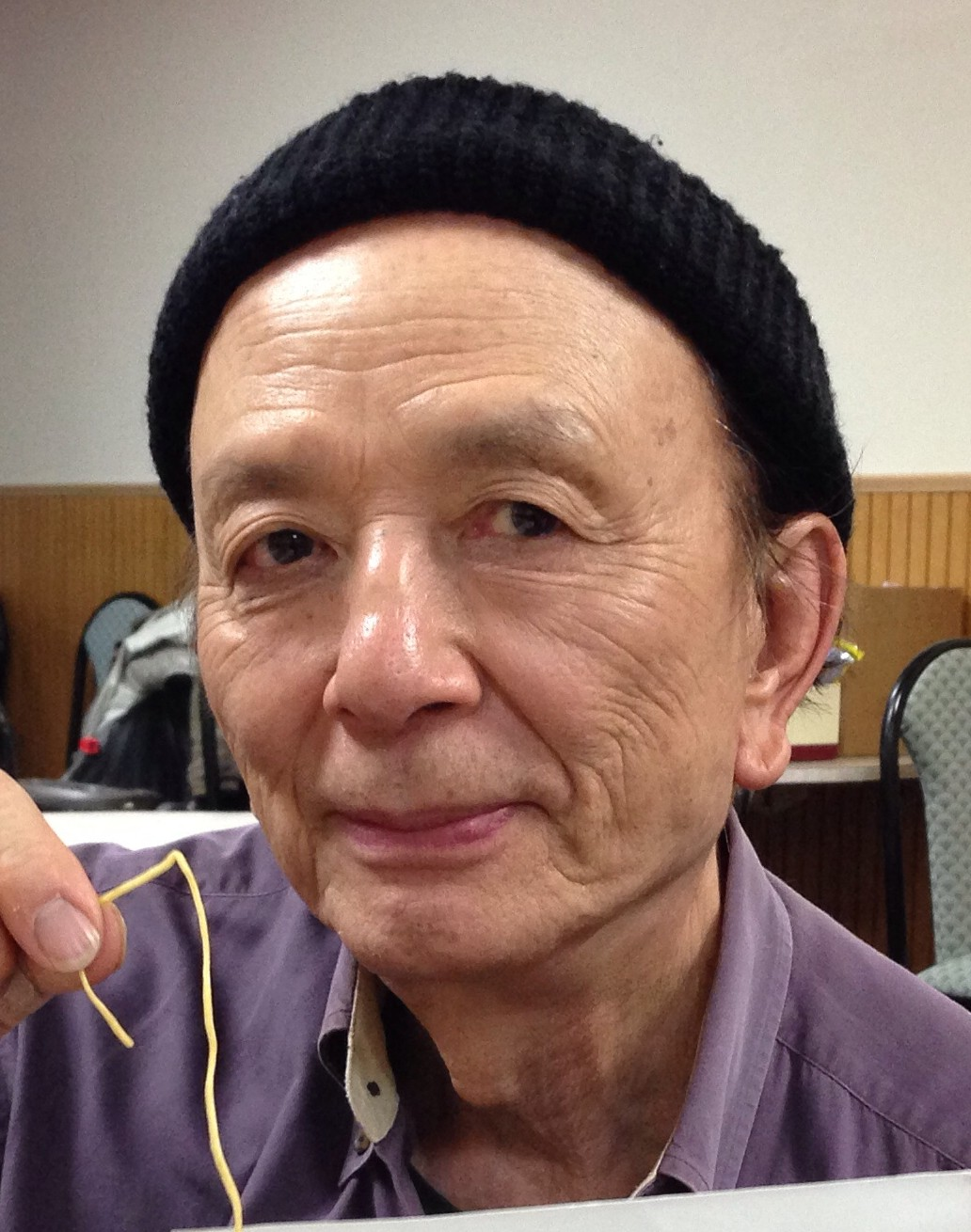
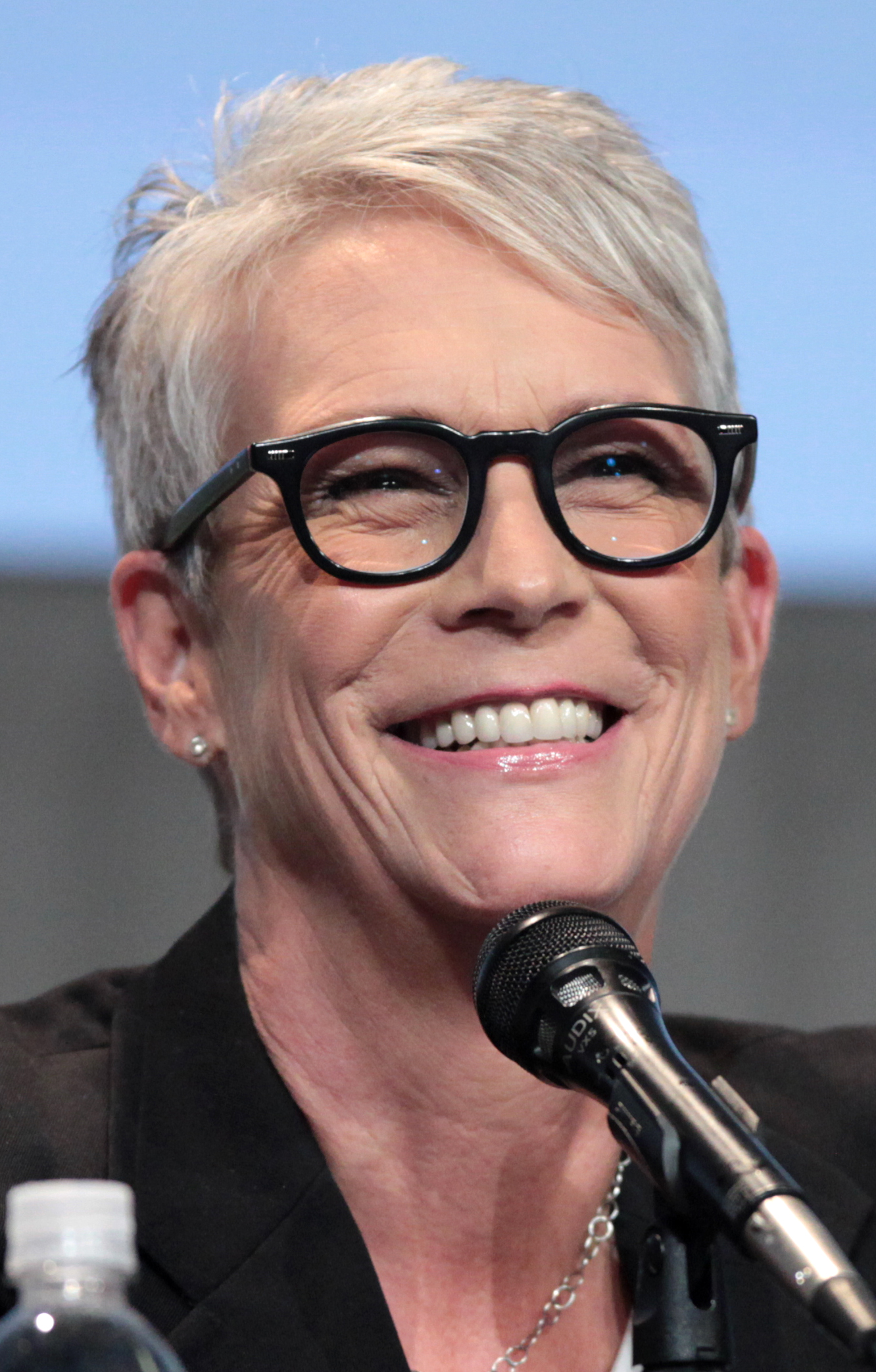
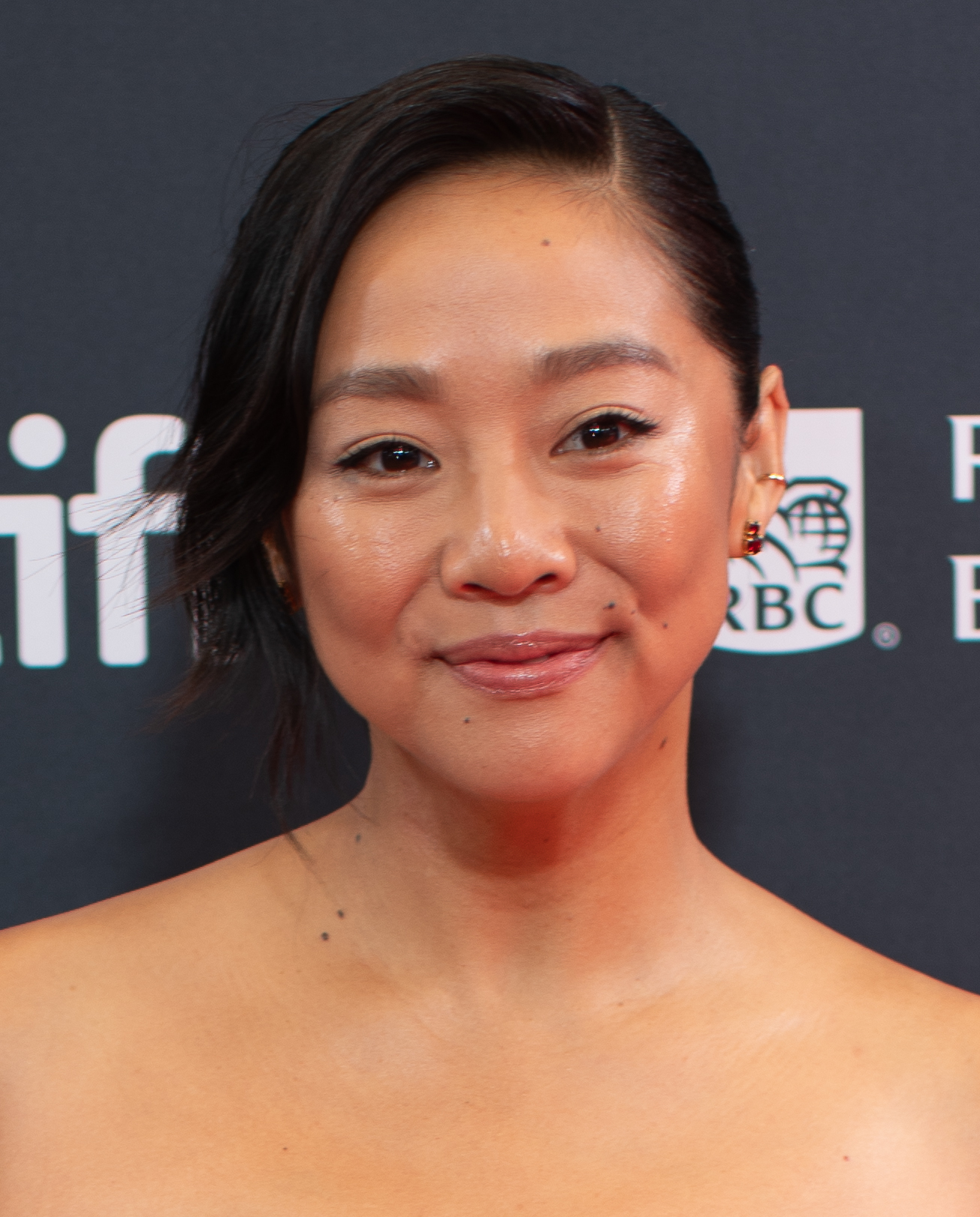
Clockwise: Everything Everywhere All at Once stars Michelle Yeoh, Ke Huy Quan, Stephanie Hsu, Jamie Lee Curtis, and James Hong.
- Michelle Yeoh as Evelyn Quan Wang, a dissatisfied and overwhelmed laundromat owner; and as several other versions of Evelyn in alternate universes.
- Stephanie Hsu as Joy Wang, Evelyn's daughter; and Jobu Tupaki, Alpha-Evelyn's omnicidal daughter whose growing nihilism is a threat to the entire multiverse.
- Ke Huy Quan as Waymond Wang, Evelyn's meek and lighthearted husband whose altruistic outlook runs contrary to Joy's nihilism; Alpha-Waymond, from the Alphaverse; and other versions of Waymond in alternate universes.
- James Hong as Gong Gong (Cantonese for "grandfather"), Evelyn's demanding father; and Alpha-Gong Gong, Alpha-Evelyn's father in the Alphaverse who wants Evelyn to sacrifice Joy to impede Jobu.
- Jamie Lee Curtis as Deirdre Beaubeirdre, an IRS Revenue Agent; and as other versions of Deirdre in alternate universes.
- Tallie Medel as Becky Sregor, Joy's girlfriend.
- Jenny Slate as Debbie the Dog Mom, a laundromat customer. (Note: The character's theatrical name of 'Big Nose' was changed for the digital release because of its association with Jewish stereotypes and antisemitism.)
- Harry Shum Jr. as Chad, a teppanyaki chef working alongside an alternative Evelyn in another universe.

Additionally, Biff Wiff appears as Rick, a laundromat customer; Sunita Mani and Aaron Lazar appear as actors in a musical film Evelyn watches; Audrey Wasilewski and Peter Banifaz appear as Alpha RV Officers; Andy Le and Brian Le appear as Alpha Trophy Jumpers; Li Jing appears as Evelyn's kung-fu teacher, and Michiko Nishiwaki appears as Evelyn's kung-fu opponent and co-star. Randy Newman, who has scored nine Disney–Pixar films, appears as the voice of Raccacoonie, a reference to the Pixar-animated film Ratatouille (2007), while Jason Hamer, Timothy Ralston, and Hiroshi Yada serve as the character's puppeteers. Directors Daniel Kwan and Daniel Scheinert make appearances in the film — the former as a man sucked into the bagel and a mugger, the latter as a district manager.

== Production ==
=== Development ===
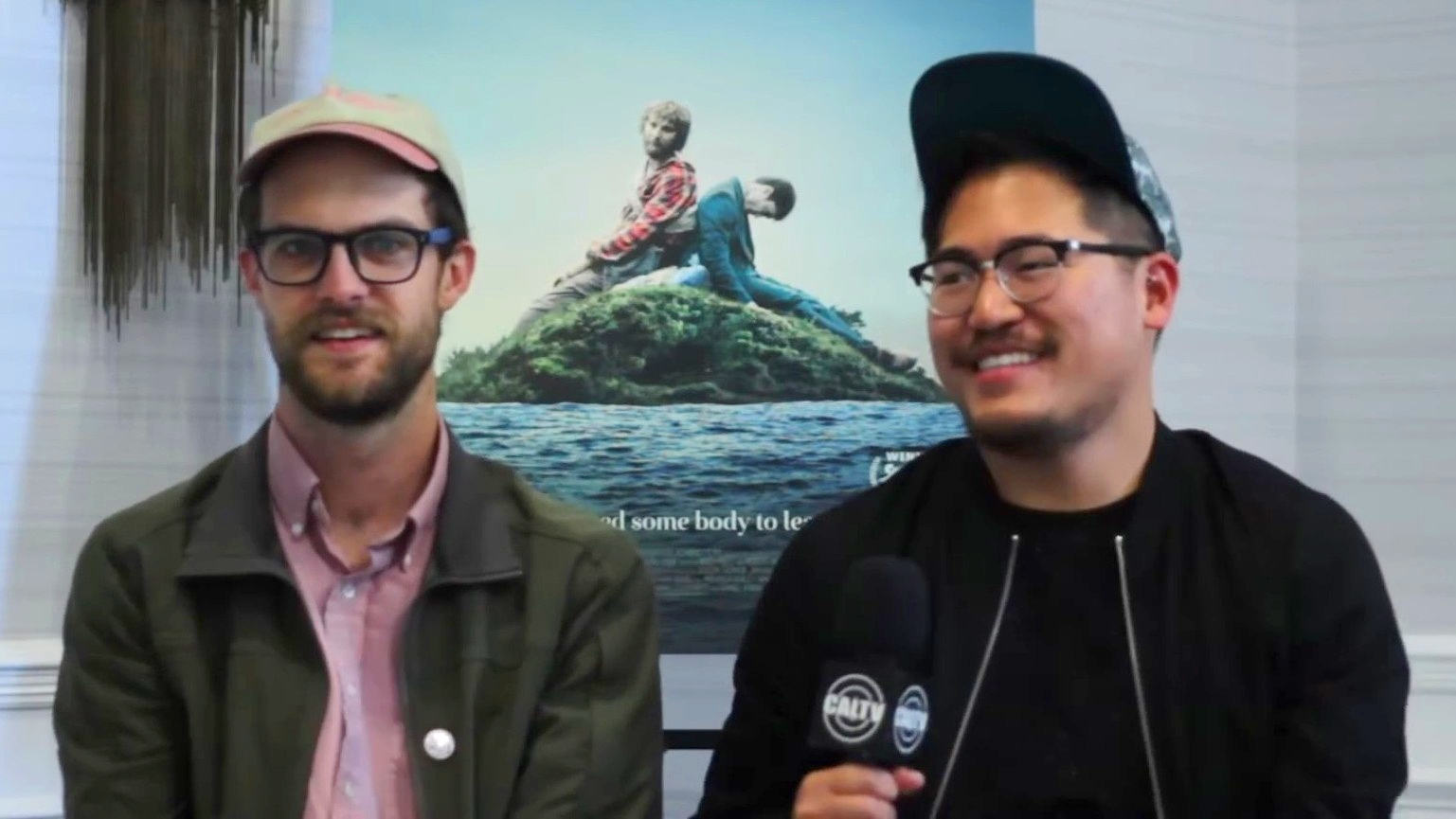
Writer-directors Daniel Scheinert and Daniel Kwan

Co-directors Daniel Kwan and Daniel Scheinert, known as the Daniels, began researching the concept of the multiverse as early as 2010, after being exposed to the concept of modal realism in the Ross McElwee documentary Sherman's March (1986). Kwan influenced Masaaki Yuasa's Mind Game (2004) and the film works of anime director Satoshi Kon, as well as the release of the animated film Spider-Man: Into the Spider-Verse (2018), which also deals with a multiversal concept, as "a little upsetting because we were like, 'Oh shit, everyone's going to beat us to this thing we've been working on'." He also stated, "Watching the second season of Rick and Morty (2013–present) was really painful. I was like, 'They've already done all the ideas we thought were original!' It was a really frustrating experience. So I stopped watching Rick and Morty while we were writing this project".

Script writing began at the end of 2016 according to Kwan and Scheinert. In early drafts of the screenplay, the directors planned for the main character to be a professor and have undiagnosed attention deficit hyperactivity disorder (ADHD); through his research for the project, Kwan learned that he had undiagnosed ADHD.

Scenes in which Evelyn trains in martial arts and becomes an action film star were visually and contextually inspired by the films of Wong Kar-wai. Chris Lee of Vulture writes that they "conjur[e] a mood of exquisite romantic yearning that will be instantly recognizable … as touchstones" of Wong's works. The universe in which Evelyn and Joy are rocks was influenced by the children's book Sylvester and the Magic Pebble (1969) and the video game Everything (2017).

Kwan has said the idea of the everything bagel "started as just a throwaway joke", a play on a type of American bagel called an "everything bagel", which is baked with a large variety of toppings. Scheinert said they spent time attempting to develop the religion of bagel followers, but encountered complications: "Jobu Tupaki's a nihilist; should there be dogma? Should there be a book? What should their practices be as a religion? The bagel stuck because it became such a useful, simple symbol that we could point to as filmmakers. And you don't have to explain it much beyond the joke."

=== Casting ===
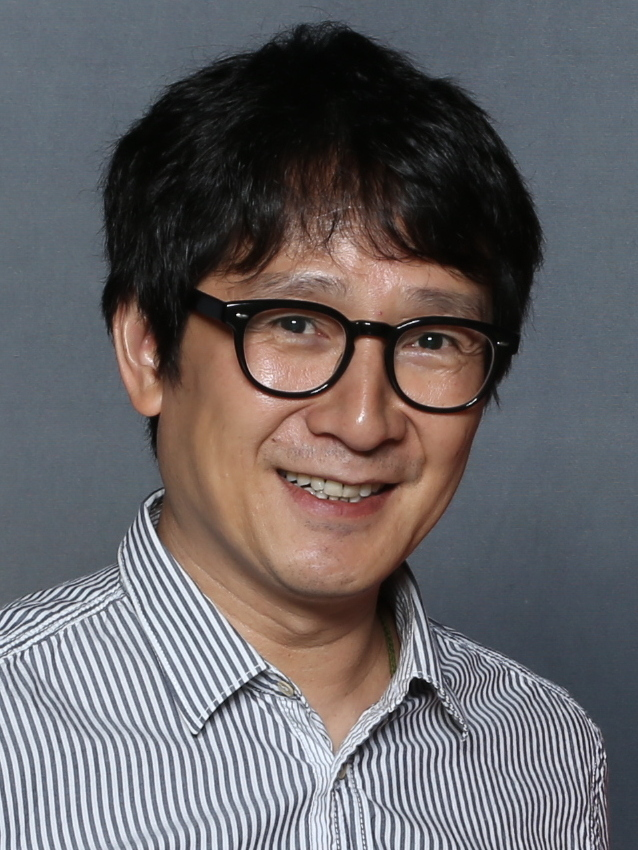
Ke Huy Quan, pictured in 2018, retired from acting in 2002 and returned shortly before being cast in this film.

The script was written for Jackie Chan until Kwan and Scheinert reconceived the protagonist as a woman, feeling it would make the husband–wife dynamic in the story more relatable.

The new script's lead character was initially named Michelle Wang, after the film's lead actress Michelle Yeoh, who said, "If you ask the Daniels, when they started on this draft, they focused on, 'Well, we are doing this for Michelle Yeoh.'" The character's name was eventually changed to Evelyn. With her resemblance to the version of Evelyn as a martial artist and film star, Yeoh opposed naming the character Michelle. "Evelyn deserves her own story to be told. This is a very ordinary mother [and] housewife who is trying her best to be a good mother to her daughter, a good daughter to her father, a wife that's trying to keep the family together […] I don't like to integrate me, Michelle Yeoh, into the characters that I play, because they all deserve their own journey and their stories to be told".

It was announced in August 2018 that Yeoh and Awkwafina had been cast to star in what was described as an "interdimensional action film" from Kwan and Scheinert, with Anthony and Joe Russo attached to produce. Awkwafina left the project in January 2020 due to scheduling conflicts, and was replaced with Stephanie Hsu. James Hong, Ke Huy Quan, and Jamie Lee Curtis joined the cast. It marked Quan's return to film acting, from which he had retired after Second Time Around (2002) due to a lack of casting opportunities. Kwan and Scheinert were inspired to cast Quan after seeing a meme of former New York mayoral candidate Andrew Yang being shown as a grown-up version of Short Round, Quan's character from Indiana Jones and the Temple of Doom (1984). They were curious to learn what Quan had been doing, and learned that he was the right age to portray Waymond. Coincidentally, Quan had returned to acting, inspired by the success of Crazy Rich Asians (2018), soon before he was approached for the role. This is a result of a domino effect where the director Jon M. Chu was inspired to create Crazy Rich Asians because of #StarringJohnCho, a movement about Asian representation in leading roles in Hollywood. Jeff Cohen, Quan's former co-star from The Goonies (1985), was his attorney to negotiate his contract.

Kwan talked about whitewashing with studios, "The casting was probably one of the hardest things of the whole process. They're like, 'Oh, should we try a white actor?'… or 'Should we find other types of people that might actually bring in the money?'" He continued, "We had to have some really hard conversations with people to basically put our foot down and say, 'No, this was written for a Chinese family.'" Scheinert said that while it took a little longer, they ultimately ended up with an ideal cast.

For Deirdre's appearance, Kwan discovered a picture of a real IRS agent he found online, which Curtis liked and wanted to emulate. Curtis wanted the character to be as "real" as possible and used her real belly for the film, as opposed to a prosthetic.

=== Filming ===
Principal photography began in January 2020, with A24 announcing that it would finance and distribute the film, while Scott Rudin was originally going to be an executive producer on the film, but left because of allegations involving his behavior. Around this time, Kwan and Scheinert were invited by Marvel Studios to discuss the possibility of them developing the first season of the Disney+ television Marvel Cinematic Universe (MCU) series Loki (2021), which also deals with a storyline involving the multiverse, but the duo, already not really interested in the project, declined as they were about to start shooting their own movie about the same concept. Shooting took 38 days, mostly in Simi Valley, California. Much of the film was shot overcranked at a very high frame rate to accommodate extensive time remapping in post production. The Daniels said the kung-fu fight scenes were shot unusually quickly; for example, the fanny-pack fight was shot in a day and a half. Filming wrapped in early March 2020, during the onset of the COVID-19 pandemic in the United States. The first cut ran around 170 minutes.

=== Visual effects ===
Visual effects post-production for the film was done in-house, after the Daniels' negative experience with a dedicated post-production studio for their 2016 film Swiss Army Man. Instead, the filmmakers assembled a small team of eight artists headed by Zak Stoltz, who produced visual effects using Adobe After Effects and Adobe Premiere Pro, and used Resilio Sync to share the large amounts of data once the pandemic hit.

For the rock universe scene, Runway AI was used to automate the process of rotoscoping shots filmed on a green screen, creating mattes that then allowed the rocks to be combined with other imagery.

== Thematic analysis ==
Everything Everywhere All at Once incorporates elements from a number of genres and film mediums, including surreal comedy, science fiction, fantasy, martial arts films and animation. A. O. Scott of The New York Times described the film as a "swirl of genre anarchy", explaining that "while the hectic action sequences and flights of science-fiction mumbo-jumbo are a big part of the fun (and the marketing), they aren't really the point. [It is] a bittersweet domestic drama, a marital comedy, a story of immigrant striving and a hurt-filled ballad of mother–daughter love". Laura Zornosa from The New York Times elaborates its addressing of intergenerational trauma through healing relationships. Additionally, Emily St. James wrote on Vox that the film is part of a rising subgenre of "millennial parental apology fantasy", imagining worlds in which parents and children reconcile.

According to Charles Bramesco of The Guardian, "The bagel of doom and its tightening grip on Evelyn's daughter lend themselves to the climactic declaration that there's nothing worse than submitting to the nihilism so trendy with the next generation. Our lone hope of recourse is to embrace all the love and beauty surrounding us, if only we're present enough to see it." This nihilism is also incorporated into the film's exploration of Asian American identity. Anne Anlin Cheng wrote in The Washington Post, "It's not only that the multiverse acts as a metaphor for the immigrant Asian experience, or a convenient parable for the dislocations and personality splits suffered by hyphenated (that is, 'Asian-American') citizens, including LGBT culture. It also becomes a rather heady vehicle for confronting and negotiating Asian-pessimism", a term she uses in reference to Afro-pessimism.

Consequence's Clint Worthington wrote that "for all its dadaist absurdism and blink-if-you-miss-it pace, Daniels weaves the chaotic possibilities in the multiverse into a cohesive story about the travails of the road not traveled, and the need to carve out your own meaning in a meaningless universe." Describing Jobu Tupaki's modus operandi, Worthington notes "the living contradiction that is the everything bagel: if you put everything on a bagel, what more is left? And if you've experienced everything that the multiverse can offer, what's the point of any of it?" Kwan said that the everything bagel concept "did two things. It allowed us to talk about nihilism without being too eye roll-y. And it creates a MacGuffin: a doomsday device. If, in the first half of the movie, people think that the bagel is here to destroy the world, and in the second half you realize it's a depressed person trying to destroy themselves, it just takes everything about action movies and turns it into something more personal." The writer George Gillett argues that the movie is "a coming-of-age film for the internet generation", with the multiverse resembling virtual environments which viewers increasingly exist within.

The philosophical themes of the film, and particularly Waymond's worldview, have been viewed as an expression of the central ideas of humanism — in particular, his belief that people should 'be kind, especially when we don't know what's going on'. Other authors have linked the themes to those of Mahayana Buddhism and Daoism, with the recurring images of the bagel and the googly eyes described as "a surprisingly apt and humorous take on yin and yang", contraposing a "smorgasbord of meaningless nothingness" against "value where you want to create it and meaning where you choose to see it".

The film engages textually and metatextually with the "real world" of the viewer. Critics have noted that one version of Evelyn — a famous martial arts movie star — is a portrayal of Yeoh, that Ke Huy Quan's experience as a stunt coordinator is used diegetically in Waymond's fight scenes, and that James Hong's transformation into "a more sinister, English-fluent, Machiavellian strategist" parallels his character Lo Pan in Big Trouble in Little China (1986). The Daniels described their approach to metatextuality as a form of post-postmodernism or metamodernism.

== Music ==
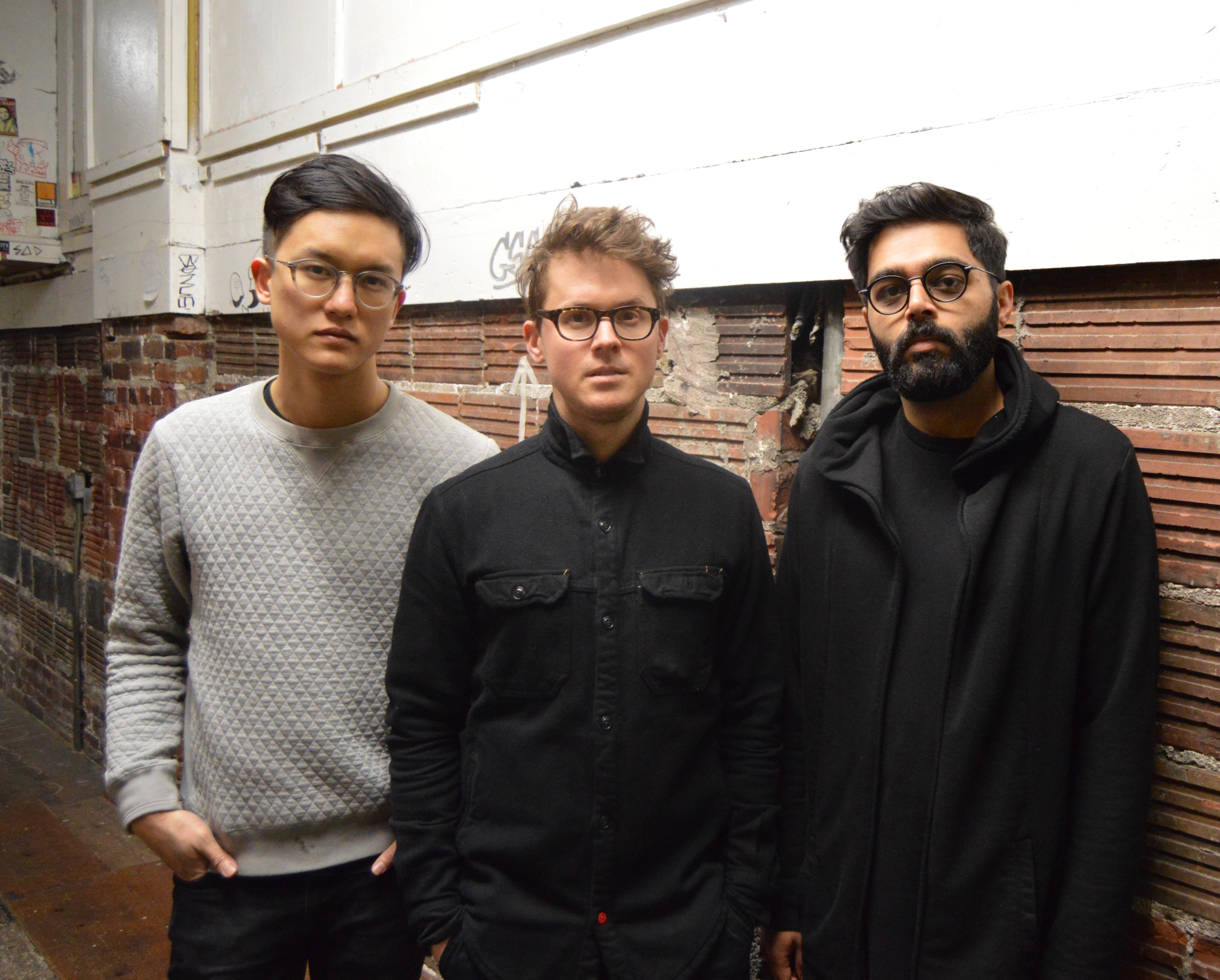
Experimental band Son Lux composed the score.

The musical score was composed by Son Lux, whose members are Ryan Lott, Ian Chang, and Rafiq Bhatia. Daniels asked them to approach the score individually, and not as a band. Lott said, "I think that the complete picture of not only who we are as a band, but also who we are as individuals and what we have accomplished and the places we've gone creatively individually, meant for them that there was a possibility that many of these universes of sound could be within reach with this particular trio."

Son Lux took two to three years to compose the score, which includes more than a hundred musical cues. The soundtrack album consists of 49 tracks and runs for more than two hours. It features several prominent musicians, including Mitski, David Byrne, a flute-playing André 3000, Randy Newman, Moses Sumney, Hajnal Pivnick, and yMusic. Two songs — "This Is a Life" featuring Mitski and Byrne and "Fence" featuring Sumney — were released as singles on March 4 and 14, 2022. The album was released on March 25 to positive critical response.

The film features several instances, both in audio and in dialogue, of the 2000 Nine Days song "Absolutely (Story of a Girl)". When Daniels contacted Nine Days vocalist John Hampson about using the song, Hampson enthusiastically agreed to record three alternate versions of the song for use in the film. Claude Debussy's Clair de lune is also prominently featured in the film, as the theme for Deirdre.

== Release ==
=== Theatrical ===
The world premiere was at the 2022 South by Southwest Film Festival on March 11. Its limited release in theaters was on March 25, 2022, and its nationwide release was on April 8, in the United States by A24. On March 30, 2022, the film was released in select IMAX theaters in the U.S. for one night only. Due to its popularity, the film returned to select IMAX theaters for one week starting on April 29, 2022. The film was not released in most parts of the Middle East, including Saudi Arabia and Kuwait, due to censorship of LGBT issues in those countries. The film was released in the United Kingdom on May 13, 2022. The film was re-released in U.S. theaters on July 29, 2022, unchanged but adding an introduction by Daniels and eight minutes of outtakes after the credits. It was re-released again in U.S. theaters on January 27, 2023, on 1,400 screens to celebrate its Oscar nominations.

The movie release had different titles depending on locale. Chinese audiences approved of the Taiwanese title 妈的多重宇宙, a double entendre which translates to either 'Mother's Multiverse' or 'Fucking Multiverse'. The Taiwanese release additionally had the tagline 比媽佛更媽佛 (lit. 'Even More Marvel than Marvel''). Taiwanese audiences disapproved of subtitles during the release for "over-translating" the movie. In mainland China, the film released under 瞬息全宇宙 (lit. 'The Entire Universe In An Instant'), while in Hong Kong it released under 奇異女俠玩救宇宙 (lit. 'Weird Warrior Woman Fucks Around And Saves The Universe').

Notably, the Singaporean release took the title 天马行空 (lit. 'horse flying in the sky'), which is the title depicted on the film's promotional poster and its ending title card. The phrase is a Chinese idiom which Kwan translates as "describing things that are unimaginable and fantastical, containing an unconstrained creativity". The calligraphy of the phrase projected on the ending title card was done by Kwan's late uncle Chiang Tao Pin.

=== Home media ===
The film was released on digital streaming platforms on June 7, 2022, and was released on Blu-ray, DVD, and Ultra HD Blu-ray on July 5, 2022, by Lionsgate Home Entertainment.

== Reception ==
=== Box office ===
Everything Everywhere All at Once grossed $77.2 million in the United States and Canada and $66.2 million in other territories, for a worldwide total of $143.4 million. Deadline Hollywood calculated the net profit of the film to be $32 million, when factoring together all expenses and revenues.

In the United States and Canada, the film earned $509,600 from ten venues in its opening weekend. Its debut had a theater average of $50,965, the second-best since the beginning of the COVID-19 pandemic for a platform release (behind Licorice Pizza) and the then-best opening theater average in 2022. In its second weekend, the film grossed $1.1 million from 38 theaters, finishing ninth at the box office. It received a wide expansion in its third weekend, going from 38 to 1,250 theaters. It made $6.1 million, finishing sixth at the box office. Playing in 2,220 theaters the following weekend, it earned $6.2 million, finishing fourth. In its sixth weekend, it added $5.5 million, part of which was attributed to a wider IMAX release following its successful box office run until then. It added $3.5 million in its seventh weekend, and another $3.3 million in its eighth. By May 21, it had made over $51 million, surpassing Uncut Gems ($50 million) as A24's highest-grossing film domestically. By June 9, it had made over $80 million, surpassing Hereditary ($79 million) as A24's highest-grossing film of all time. It remained in the box office top ten until its sixteenth weekend, which ended on July 10. The film crossed the $100 million mark worldwide on July 31, making it the first independent film released during the pandemic (and in A24's history) to achieve this distinction.

Outside of the United States, other top-earning territories as of July 31 were the United Kingdom ($6.2 million), Canada ($5.1 million), Australia ($4.5 million), Russia ($2.4 million), Taiwan ($2.3 million), Mexico ($2 million), Hong Kong ($1.7 million), Germany ($1.5 million), and the Netherlands ($1.1 million).

=== Critical response ===
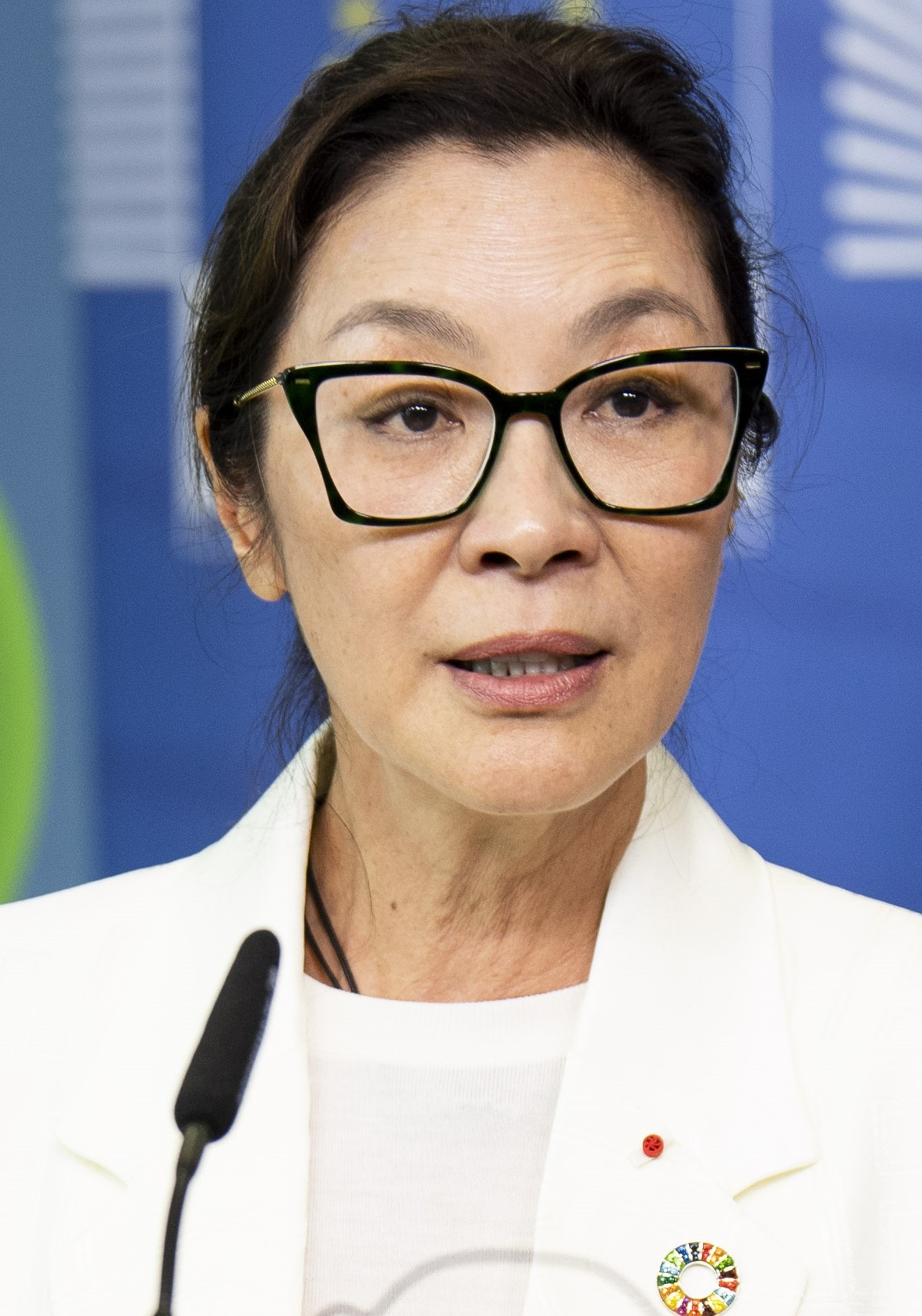
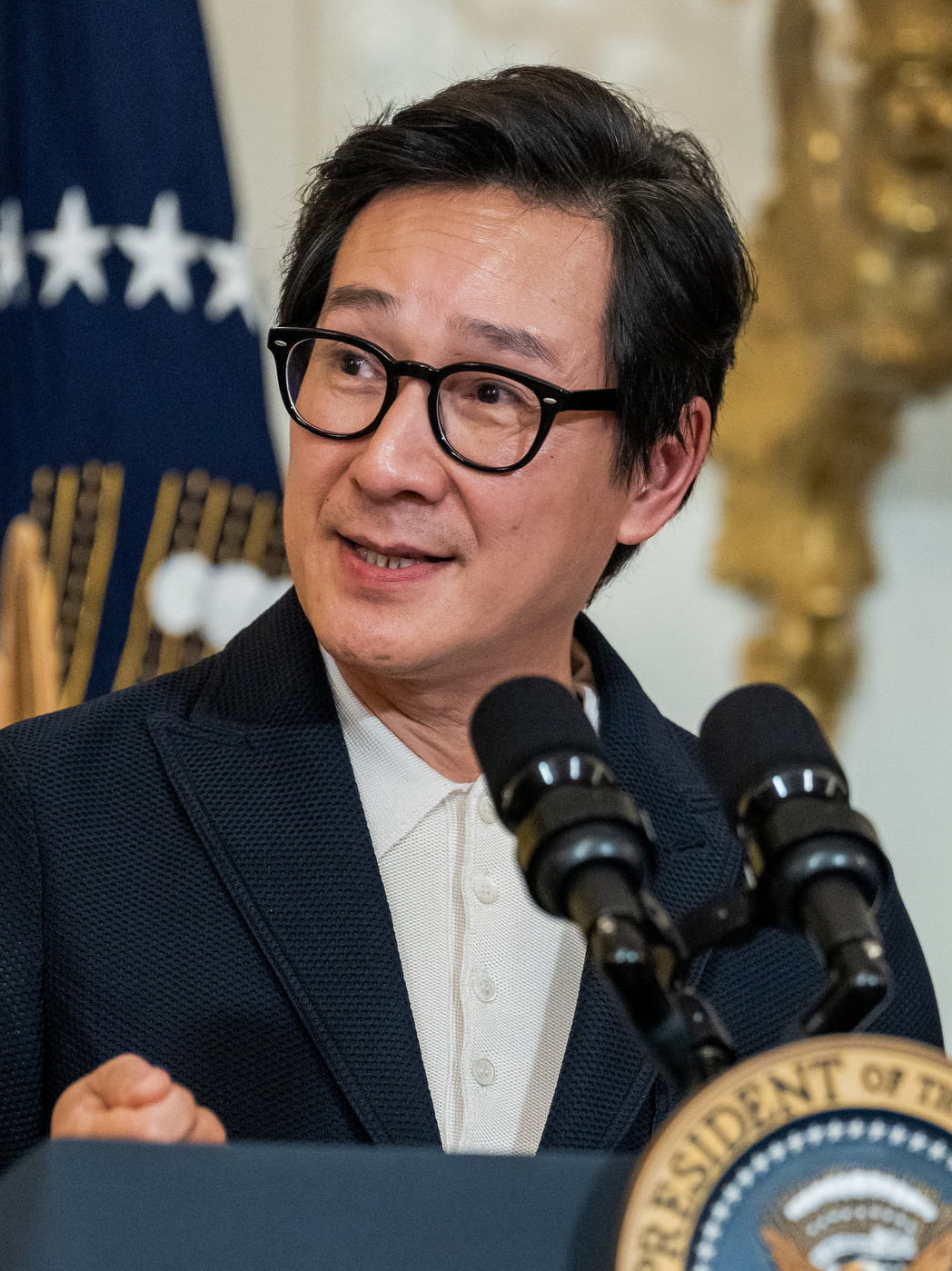
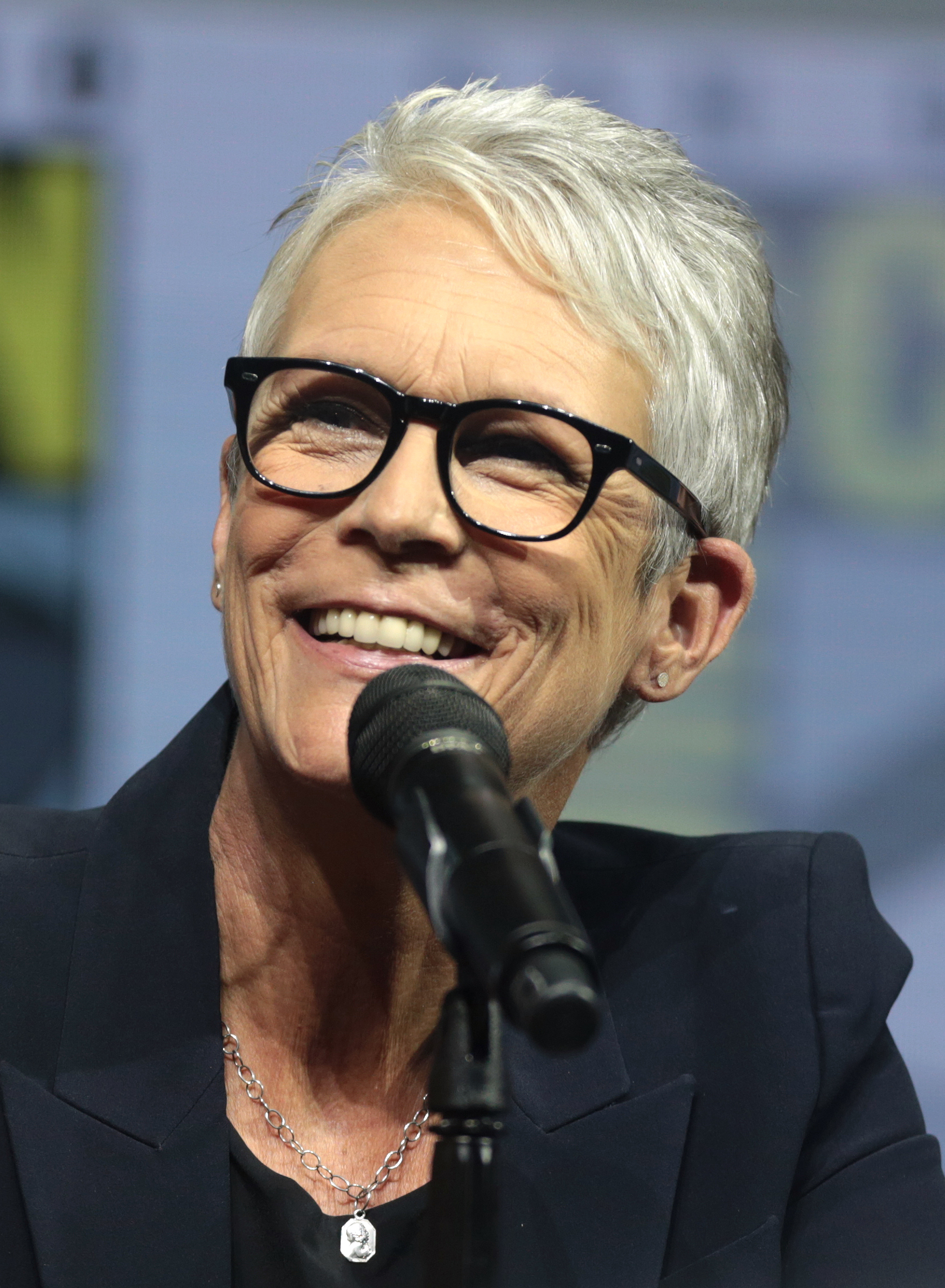
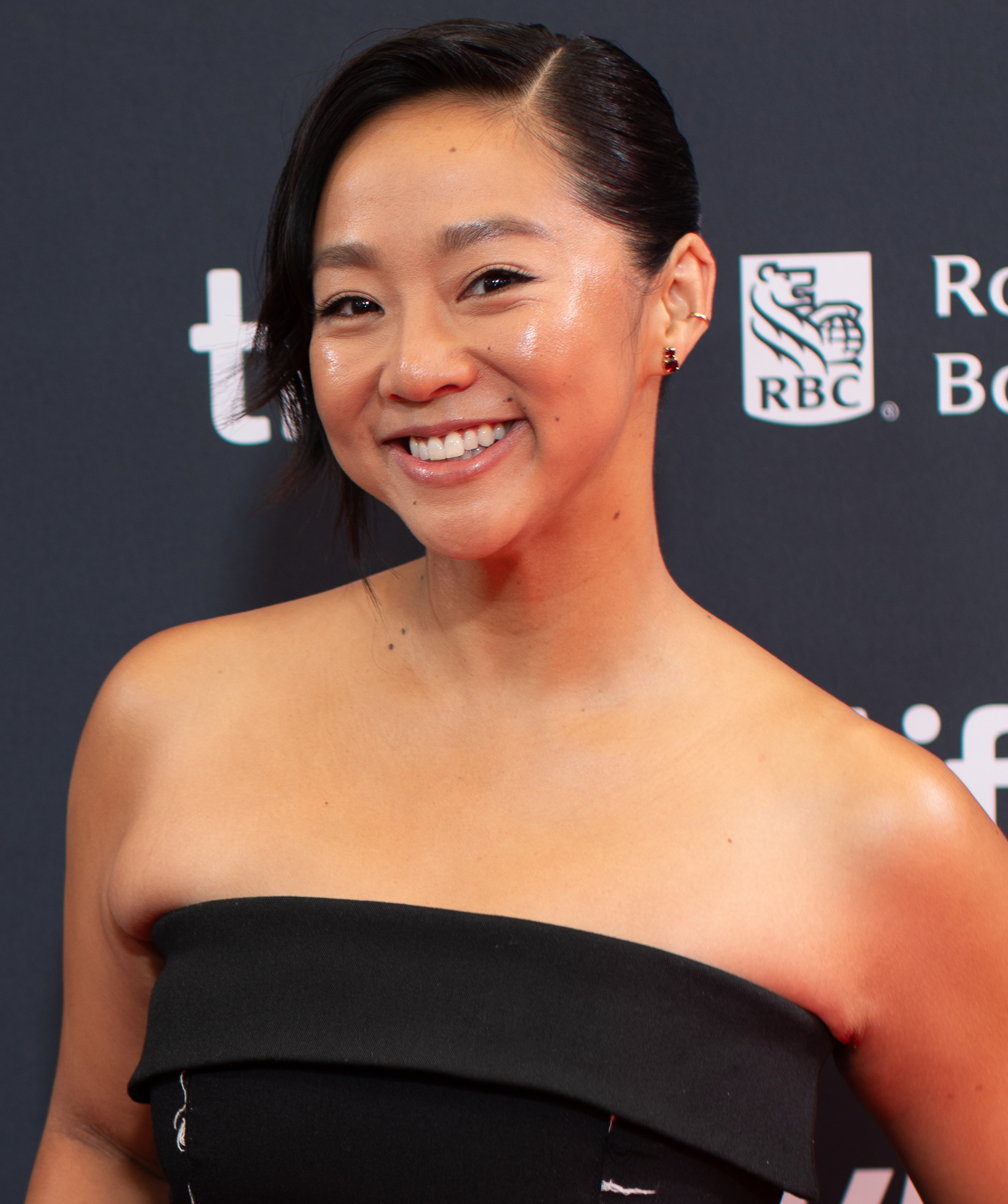
Michelle Yeoh, Ke Huy Quan, Jamie Lee Curtis, and Stephanie Hsu garnered critical acclaim for their performances and earned Academy Award nominations for Best Actress, Best Supporting Actor, and Best Supporting Actress, with Yeoh, Quan, and Curtis winning.

The film garnered widespread critical acclaim. On the review aggregator website Rotten Tomatoes, 93% of 407 critics' reviews are positive, with an average rating of 8.5/10. The website's consensus reads: "Led by an outstanding Michelle Yeoh, Everything Everywhere All at Once lives up to its title with an expertly calibrated assault on the senses." Metacritic, which uses a weighted average, assigned the film a score of 81 out of 100, based on 55 critics, indicating "universal acclaim". Audiences polled by PostTrak gave it an 89% positive score, with 77% saying that they would definitely recommend it.

Critics have noted that Everything Everywhere All at Once explores themes of immigrant identity, intergenerational conflict, and cultural assimilation. The film portrays the experiences of a Chinese American immigrant family, highlighting tensions between traditional values and life in the United States, as well as communication barriers shaped by language and cultural differences.

Scholars Afarin Rajaei and Karen McKenna-Quayle argue that the film examines intergenerational trauma, conflicted identities, and the challenges faced by immigrant families navigating multiple cultural frameworks.

David Ehrlich of IndieWire called the film an "orgiastic work of slaphappy genius", praising the direction and performances, particularly Yeoh's, calling it the "greatest performance that Michelle Yeoh has ever given". The Hollywood Reporter's David Rooney called it a "frenetically plotted serve of stoner heaven [that] is insanely imaginative and often a lot of fun", complimenting the cast and score but found the handling of the story's underlying theme underwhelming. In her review for RogerEbert.com, Marya E. Gates lauded Yeoh's performance, writing, "Yeoh is the anchor of the film, given a role that showcases her wide range of talents, from her fine martial art skills to her superb comic timing to her ability to excavate endless depths of rich human emotion, often just from a glance or a reaction." Bramesco praised the Daniels for constructing a "large, elaborate, polished, and detailed expression of a vision", Amy Nicholson of The Wall Street Journal wrote, "Over its nearly two-and-a-half-hour running time, the movie's ambitions double, and double again, as though it's a Petri dish teeming with Mr. Kwan and Mr. Scheinert's wildest ideas."

Some reviewers called Yeoh's performance the best of her career. In her review for Vanity Fair, Maureen Ryan said, "Yeoh imbues Evelyn with moving shades of melancholy, regret, resolve, and growing curiosity" adding that she "makes her embrace of lead-character energy positively gripping." Adam Nayman of The Ringer referred to the film as "a love letter to Yeoh [and] extremely poignant, giving its 59-year-old star a chance to flex unexpected acting muscles while revisiting the high-flying fight choreography that made her a global icon back in the 1990s". In his review for the Chicago Sun-Times, Jake Coyle wrote that although it "can verge on overload, it's this liberating sense of limitless possibility that the movie leaves you filled with, both in its freewheeling anything-goes playfulness and in its surprisingly tender portrait of existential despair". Tasha Robinson of Polygon named the scene of Evelyn and Joy Wang as rocks with their dialogue appearing as on-screen subtitles, all while trying to find common ground, as one of the best movie scenes of 2022, saying "… it's a perfect moment. Like so many EEAAO sequences, it turns between emotions on a dime. But the quiet of the moment is essential. Out of context, it's just an odd moment between rocks. But within the context of the film, it's a breather the audience and characters both desperately need, and the emotions are so heightened that just the sight of rock-Joy and rock-Evelyn sharing a companionable laugh is remarkably heartening and hilarious."

Armond White of National Review wrote: "Unschooled Marvel addicts who never heard of Kafka, Buñuel, or Chuck Jones easily fall for the entropy farce. The Daniels refuse narrative convention in order to represent our culture's gradual decline into disorder… The film's ultimate message: 'Be Kind', spoken by two rocks. It's a childish palliative… Yeoh brings adult stability to the blackout-skit chaos and cast of 'stupid human' clowns. But the Daniels reduce life to 'just a statistical inevitability, it's nothing special'."

Bertin Huynh wrote in The Guardian that the film "distils east Asian philosophies like no other before it" and that "its heart of Buddhist and Daoist thought is what makes Everything Everywhere truly great"; he further criticised Western reviews of the film, stating that the message of the film was "often missed by a western audience", and "wholly emblematic of Hollywood's dismissiveness of Asian achievements and stories".

Dissenting reviews include that of Richard Brody for The New Yorker, who dismissed it as a "sickly cynical feature-length directorial pitch reel for a Marvel movie", and that of Peter Bradshaw for The Guardian who described it as "a formless splurge of Nothing Nowhere Over a Long Period of Time".

The New York Times named the character Jobu Tupaki, played by Hsu, one of the 93 Most Stylish "People" of 2022.

=== Legacy ===
On January 1, 2024, Rolling Stone ranked the film at number 49 on its list of "The 150 Best Sci-Fi Movies of All Time", writing "As characters leap from universe to universe (including one where humanity evolved to have… hot dog fingers?), and borrow skills from their counterparts, the Daniels never lose sight of the frayed emotions that are still tying the three main characters together, which in turn kept the metaphysical machinations feeling clear and easy to follow."

IndieWire ranked it at number 8 on its list of the "50 Best Action Movies of the 21st Century" and number 5 on its list of the "62 Best Science Fiction Films of the 21st Century". In 2025, it ranked number 77 on The New York Times' list of "The 100 Best Movies of the 21st Century".

=== Accolades ===
==== United States ====
It won seven of its 11 Academy Award nominations: Best Picture, Best Director, Best Actress (Yeoh), Best Supporting Actor (Quan), Best Supporting Actress (Curtis), Best Original Screenplay and Best Film Editing including a record-tying six above-the-line wins (picture, director, screenplay and acting) including three acting wins; 13 Critics' Choice Awards nominations (winning five); eight Film Independent Spirit Awards nominations (winning a record-breaking seven); and six Golden Globe Awards nominations (winning two). It was named one of the top 10 films of 2022 by the National Board of Review and the American Film Institute. The film also won top prizes from the Directors Guild of America Awards, Producers Guild of America Awards, Writers Guild of America Awards, and Screen Actors Guild Awards (the last of which it won a record-breaking four awards); the film became the fifth film to sweep all four top prizes from the major guilds (DGA, PGA, WGA, SAG), after American Beauty, No Country for Old Men, Slumdog Millionaire, and Argo (all five films ended up winning Best Picture at their respective Academy Award ceremonies).

Everything Everywhere All at Once made Academy Awards history in several categories. Yeoh was the first Asian Best Actress, the second woman of color after Halle Berry in 2002, and the first Malaysian to win any Academy Award. Stephanie Hsu's nomination in the Best Supporting Actress category, alongside Hong Chau's nomination for The Whale, marked the first time two actresses of Asian ethnicity were nominated in that category in the same year. Quan was the first Vietnam-born actor to win an Academy Award. Jamie Lee Curtis also won the first Oscar of her career, for Best Supporting Actress, helping the film win three out of four acting categories. It is also the first science-fiction film to win Best Picture, and the first science-fiction film to win five of the top six Academy Awards. While no film has ever won in all four acting categories, it was the third to win three out of four, after A Streetcar Named Desire (1951) and Network (1976), and the first to also win Best Picture. It is the first film since 2013's Gravity to win seven Academy Awards, and the most awarded Best Picture winner since 2008's Slumdog Millionaire.

The reaction to the film's Best Picture win was not without criticism, including Justin Chang lamenting in the Los Angeles Times that the academy "chose the wrong best picture", and compared its win to that of CODA at the previous ceremony:

"The more I’ve thought about Everything Everywhere, for all its undeniable representational significance, the more traditional a best picture winner it seems. Beneath its veneer of impish, form-busting radicalism, it's as epically self-important, broadly sentimental and thematically unambiguous a movie as any the academy has so honored."

==== United Kingdom ====
The film received 10 BAFTA nominations, winning one.

== See also ==
- Asian Americans in arts and entertainment
- List of A24 films
- List of Academy Award records
- List of Academy Award winners and nominees of Asian descent
- Portrayal of East Asians in American film and theater
- Parallel universes in fiction
