= Brighter Wounds =

Studio album by Son Lux
- Released: February 9, 2018
- Genre: Experimental; avant-garde
- Length: 44:44
- Label: City Slang
- Producer: Ryan Lott; Rafiq Bhatia; Ian Chang

Son Lux chronology
Bones (2015)	Brighter Wounds (2018)	Tomorrows I (2020)

Singles from Brighter Wounds
- 1. "Slowly" Released: January 9, 2018; 2. "Dream State" Released: March 7, 2018; 3. "The Fool You Need" Released: August 8, 2018

Professional ratings
Aggregate scores
Source	Rating
Metacritic	77/100
Review scores
Source	Rating
AllMusic	4/5 stars
Clash	7/10
Pitchfork	7.3/10
Slant Magazine	3.5/5 stars
Under the Radar	8/10 stars

Brighter Wounds is the fifth studio album by Son Lux. It was released through City Slang on February 9, 2018. Music videos were created for "Slowly", "All Directions", and "The Fool You Need".

== Critical reception ==
At Metacritic, which assigns a weighted average score out of 100 to reviews from mainstream critics, the album received an average score of 77 based on 11 reviews. This indicated that it garnered "generally favorable reviews".

== Track listing ==
All tracks are written by Ryan Lott, Rafiq Bhatia, and Ian Chang.

No.	Title	Length
1.	"Forty Screams"	4:02
2.	"Dream State"	5:02
3.	"Labor"	4:09
4.	"The Fool You Need"	4:25
5.	"Slowly"	4:00
6.	"All Directions"	6:36
7.	"Aquatic"	4:38
8.	"Surrounded"	5:10
9.	"Young"	1:11
10.	"Resurrection"	5:31

== Personnel ==
Credits adapted from liner notes.

Son Lux

- Ryan Lott – performance, production, arrangement
- Rafiq Bhatia – performance, production, arrangement
- Ian Chang – performance, production, arrangement

Additional musicians

- Starr Busby – vocals (1–4, 6, 10)
- Kate Davis – vocals (1–4, 6, 10)
- Casey Dienel – vocals (1–4, 6, 10)
- Nina Moffitt – vocals (1–4, 6, 10)
- Kristin Slipp – vocals (1–4, 6, 10)
- Vuyo Sotashe – vocals (1–4, 6, 10)
- DM Stith – vocals (1–4, 6, 10)
- Vanessa Upson – vocals (1–4, 6, 10)
- Hideaki Aomori – clarinet (1, 2, 4, 10), flute (2), saxophone (2, 4)
- Hajnal Pivnick – violin (1, 10)
- Rob Moose – violin (1, 3, 6, 10), viola (1, 3, 6, 10)
- C.J. Camerieri – trumpet (2, 10), horn (9)
- Jackson Hill – bass guitar (3–5)
- Arrington de Dionyso – clarinet (3), flute (3)
- Indianapolis Children's Choir – vocals (4, 6, 10)
- Dave Douglas – trumpet (4)
- Trina Basu – violin (4)
- Arun Ramamurthy – violin (4)
- Anjna Swaminathan – violin (4)
- Nadia Sirota – viola (7)
- Alex Sopp – flute (10)

Technical personnel

- Ryan Lott – string arrangement (3, 6, 10), horn arrangement (9), mixing (4, 6, 7, 9)
- Rob Moose – string arrangement (1, 3, 6, 10)
- C.J. Camerieri – horn arrangement (9)
- Chris Tabron – mixing (1–3, 5, 8, 10)
- Dave Kutch – mastering (all tracks)

== Charts ==
Chart (2018)	Peak position
Belgian Albums (Ultratop Flanders)	116
Swiss Albums (Schweizer Hitparade)	78
