= Bones (Son Lux album) =

Studio album by Son Lux
- Released: June 23, 2015
- Genre: Post-rock
- Length: 39:11
- Label: Glassnote
- Producers: Ryan Lott; Rafiq Bhatia; Ian Chang

Son Lux chronology
Lanterns (2013)	Bones (2015)	Brighter Wounds (2018)

Singles from Bones
- 1. "Undone" Released: October 23, 2015

Professional ratings
Aggregate scores
Source	Rating
Metacritic	66/100
Review scores
Source	Rating
AllMusic	4/5 stars
Consequence of Sound	C
The Guardian	3/5 stars
Paste	8.0/10
Pitchfork	7.2/10
PopMatters	3/10 stars

Bones is the fourth studio album by Son Lux. It was released through Glassnote Records on June 23, 2015. With the release of the album, members Rafiq Bhatia and Ian Chang joined founding member Ryan Lott, transitioning Son Lux from a solo project to a three-piece band. It peaked at number 14 on the Billboard Heatseekers Albums chart, as well as number 10 on the Top Dance/Electronic Albums chart.

== Critical reception ==
At Metacritic, which assigns a weighted average score out of 100 to reviews from mainstream critics, the album received an average score of 66 based on 13 reviews, indicating "generally favorable reviews".

== Track listing ==
All tracks are written by Ryan Lott, Rafiq Bhatia, and Ian Chang.

No.	Title	Length
1.	"Breathe In"	0:50
2.	"Change Is Everything"	3:04
3.	"Flight"	3:20
4.	"You Don't Know Me"	3:40
5.	"This Time"	3:50
6.	"I Am the Others"	4:45
7.	"Your Day Will Come"	3:22
8.	"Undone"	4:20
9.	"White Lies"	4:57
10.	"Now I Want"	4:03
11.	"Breathe Out"	3:00

== Personnel ==
Credits adapted from liner notes.

Son Lux

- Ryan Lott – performance, production, recording, mixing
- Rafiq Bhatia – performance, production, recording, mixing
- Ian Chang – performance, production, recording, mixing

Additional musicians

- Rob Moose – violin (1, 4, 7, 9, 11), viola (1, 4, 7, 9, 11)
- Logan Cole – upright bass (2, 6)
- Kristin Andreassen – vocals (2, 3, 5, 10)
- Joy Askew – vocals (2, 3, 5, 10)
- Jennifer Lott – vocals (2, 3, 5, 10)
- Cat Martino – vocals (2, 3, 5, 10)
- Nina Moffitt – vocals (2, 3, 5, 10)
- Sarah Pedinotti – vocals (2, 3, 5, 10)
- Kristin Slipp – vocals (2, 3, 5, 10)
- Elizabeth Ziman – vocals (2, 3, 5, 10)
- Alex Sopp – flute (3)
- Jackson Hill – bass guitar (4, 8)
- Hanna Benn – vocals (4, 6, 9), vocal arrangement (4, 6, 9)
- Moses Sumney – vocals (4)
- Liz Nistico – vocals (5), vocal arrangement (5)
- D.M. Stith – vocals (6, 7, 8)
- Elena Tonra – vocals (9)

Technical personnel

- Todd Carder – additional engineering
- Louie Diller – additional engineering
- Igor Haefeli – additional engineering
- Tomek Miernowski – additional engineering
- Ephriam Nagler – additional engineering
- Alex Overington – additional engineering
- Chris Tabron – additional engineering
- Pete Lyman – mastering
- Marke Johnson – art direction, design, photography
- Nathan Johnson – art direction, design, photography

== Charts ==
Chart (2015)	Peak position
Belgian Albums (Ultratop Flanders)	144
Belgian Albums (Ultratop Wallonia)	187
US Heatseekers Albums (Billboard)	14
US Top Dance/Electronic Albums (Billboard)	10
