= Rafiq Bhatia =

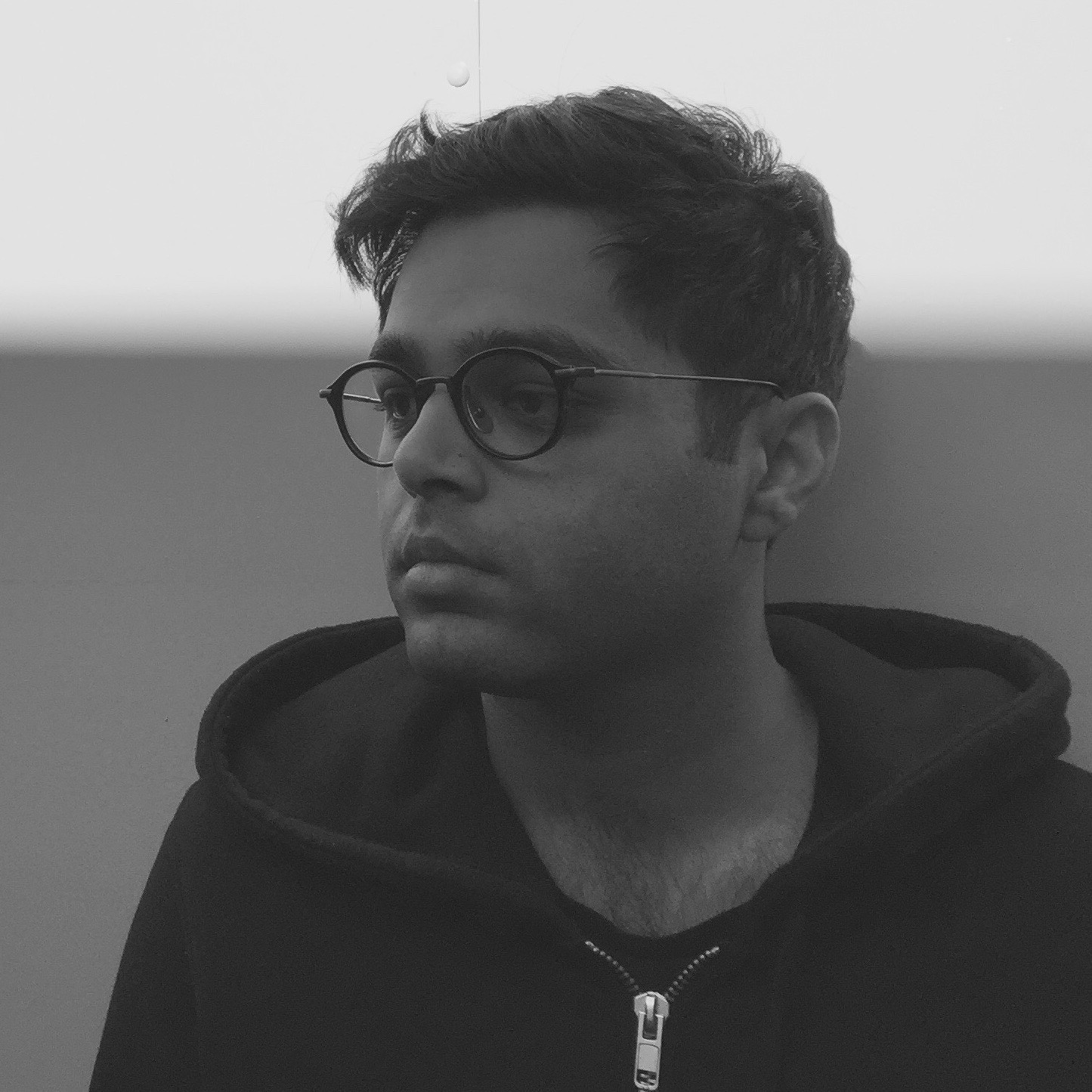
- Bhatia in 2016

Background information
- Born: August 21, 1987 (age 39); Hickory, North Carolina, United States
- Genre: Post rock
- Occupation: Musician
- Instrument: Guitar
- Website: rafiqbhatia.com

Rafiq Bhatia (born 21 August 1987) is an American musician, composer, guitarist, and producer. He is the guitarist and fellow producer of the American experimental rock band Son Lux, having been a touring member prior.

As a solo artist, he has recorded four solo albums Yes it Will (2012), Strata (2012), Breaking English (2018), and Environments (2025), and two EPs Standards Vol. 1 (2020) and Each Dream, A Melting Door (2025). Bhatia has also worked with musicians Olga Bell, Sam Dew, Dave Douglas, Marcus Gilmore, Billy Hart, Heems, Helado Negro, Vijay Iyer, Glenn Kotche, Valgeir Sigurðsson, Moses Sumney, and David Virelles.

In 2022, Bhatia and his bandmates in Son Lux composed the original score for the film Everything Everywhere All at Once. The score received nominations for Best Original Score at both the Academy Awards and the BAFTA Awards.

== Career ==
A second-generation American of East African Indian descent, Bhatia was born in Hickory, North Carolina and grew up in Raleigh. His interest in music began with two inspirations: his grandfather’s reedy, a capella renditions of Ginans, and listening to gangster rap on the radio. He began playing guitar in high school.

After graduating from Oberlin College with a degree in neuroscience and economics, in 2010 Bhatia moved to Brooklyn, where he has remained. The composer-guitarist's first two albums, Strata and Yes It Will, were described as "transcending real sound in real time with the unexpected," and as "approximating life in the information age … profuse, immersive and immense."

In 2014, Bhatia and drummer Ian Chang became members of Son Lux, expanding the former solo project of Ryan Lott into a trio. They have since been heralded as "the world's most lethal band", and described as "thrilling... an ideal synthesis of contemporary forms". In the past few years, Son Lux has written, recorded, and released the album Bones and its companion EP Stranger Forms and have given over 300 performances in North America, Europe, and Asia.

Bhatia has recorded with Lorde, Sufjan Stevens, Heems, and David Virelles, and on the soundtracks to the films The Disappearance of Eleanor Rigby, Air, and Afflicted. He has also recorded with members of the chamber ensembles International Contemporary Ensemble, JACK Quartet, and Alarm Will Sound.

In 2022, Bhatia and his bandmates in Son Lux composed the original score for the film Everything Everywhere All at Once. The score received nominations for Best Original Score at both the Academy Awards and the BAFTA Awards. The soundtrack features contributions from artists including Mitski, David Byrne, André 3000, John Hampson, and Randy Newman. The film won seven Academy Awards, including Best Picture, Best Director, and three acting awards, and received additional accolades such as two Golden Globe Awards, five Critics' Choice Movie Awards, a BAFTA Award, and four Screen Actors Guild Awards.

As a composer, Bhatia has received commissions from various institutions, including the Kronos Quartet, Walker Art Center, Public Records, the Kennedy Center, Jennifer Koh, Liquid Music, National Sawdust, Newfields, The Jazz Gallery, and the Toledo Museum of Art. He has collaborated with a diverse range of artists across musical genres and disciplines, such as Arooj Aftab, Holland Andrews, Michael Cina, Teju Cole, Sam Dew, Billy Hart, Marcus Gilmore, Shahzad Ismaily, Vijay Iyer, Glenn Kotche, Okkyung Lee, Qasim Naqvi, Helado Negro, Kassa Overall, Cécile McLorin Salvant, Valgeir Sigurðsson, Alex Somers, Moses Sumney, Rajna Swaminathan, Kiah Victoria, and David Virelles. His contributions appear on recordings released by labels such as Brownswood, City Slang, ECM, Glassnote, Greenleaf Music, Joyful Noise, New Amsterdam, RCA, and Temporary Residence Limited.

Bhatia's collaboration with Thai director Apichatpong Weerasethakul, titled On Blue, was performed live by Alarm Will Sound during consecutive nights at the Brooklyn Academy of Music’s Howard Gilman Opera House in 2024. Additionally, the Alvin Ailey American Dance Theater toured a twenty-minute work set to selections from Bhatia's 2020 EP, Standards Vol. I.

Since the release of Standards Vol. I, Bhatia has continued to engage with the jazz community, performing alongside artists such as Ambrose Akinmusire, Dave Douglas, Ganavya, James Brandon Lewis, and Samora Pinderhughes. He has also produced debut recordings for pianist Chris Pattishall and trumpeter Riley Mulherkar.

== Discography ==
=== As Rafiq Bhatia ===
- Strata EP (2012) – digital – Rest Assured
- Yes It Will (2012) – 12" vinyl, CD, digital – Rest Assured
- Breaking English (2018) – 12" vinyl, CD, digital – ANTI-
- Standards Vol. 1 (2022) – digital EP – ANTI-
- Each Dream, A Melting Door (2025) – digital EP – ANTI-
- Environments (2025) – 12" vinyl, CD, digital – ANTI-

=== With Son Lux ===
- Lanterns (2013) – 12" vinyl, CD, digital – Joyful Noise
- Alternate Worlds (2013) – 12" vinyl, digital – Joyful Noise
- Bones (2015) – 12" vinyl, CD, digital – Glassnote
- Stranger Forms (2016) – digital – Glassnote
- Yesterday's Wake (2018) – digital EP – City Slang
- Brighter Wounds (2018) – digital – City Slang
- Tomorrows (2020-2021) – digital 3-part release – City Slang
- Risk Of Make believe (2025) – digital EP – City Slang

=== With other artists ===
- Sisyphus, Sisyphus (2013) – 2x12" vinyl, digital – Joyful Noise/Asthmatic Kitty
- Tecla, We Are The Lucky Ones (2013) – CD, digital – Mayimba Music/RCA
- Heems, Eat Pray Thug (2015) – 12" vinyl, CD, digital – Megaforce
- David Virelles, Antenna (2016) – 7" vinyl, digital – ECM
- Dave Douglas, GIFTS (2024) – 12" vinyl, CD, digital – Greenleaf Music

=== Soundtracks ===
- Son Lux, Original Music From and Inspired By: The Disappearance of Eleanor Rigby (Original Motion Picture Soundtrack) (2014) – digital – Glassnote
- Edo Van Breemen – AIR (Original Motion Picture Score) (2015) – LP, CD, digital – Nettwerk
- Son Lux, Everything Everywhere All At Once (Original Motion Picture Score) (2022) – digital – A24 Music
- Son Lux, Thunderbolts* (Original Motion Picture Score) (2025) – digital – Marvel
