= Lanterns (Son Lux album) =

Studio album by Son Lux
- Released: October 29, 2013
- Genres: Post-rock; experimental; electronic
- Length: 41:35
- Label: Joyful Noise
- Producer: Ryan Lott

Son Lux chronology
We Are Rising (2011)	Lanterns (2013)	Bones (2015)

Singles from Lanterns
- 1. "Alternate Worlds" Released: March 4, 2014

Professional ratings
Aggregate scores
Source	Rating
Metacritic	75/100
Review scores
Source	Rating
AllMusic	4.5/5 stars
CMJ	favorable
The Line of Best Fit	8/10
Paste	7.3/10
Pitchfork	6.6/10
PopMatters	6/10 stars
The Skinny	4/5 stars

Lanterns is the third studio album by Ryan Lott under the Son Lux moniker. It was released on October 29, 2013, by Joyful Noise Recordings. It peaked at number 13 on the Billboard Heatseekers Albums chart, as well as number 6 on the Vinyl Albums chart.

== Critical reception ==
At Metacritic, which assigns a weighted average score out of 100 to reviews from mainstream critics, the album received an average score of 75 based on 8 reviews, indicating "generally favorable reviews".

Gregory Heaney of AllMusic gave the album 4 and half stars out of 5 and called it, "an intricately assembled album of delicate harmonies and solidly crafted beats that sits at the intersection of bedroom pop and left-field production." Chris Buckle of The Skinny gave the album 4 stars out of 5 and stated that, "In sum, Lanterns is the sound of a maverick talent edging ever closer to his full, stimulating potential."

== Track listing ==
All tracks are written by Ryan Lott.

No.	Title	Length
1.	"Alternate World"	4:15
2.	"Lost It to Trying"	4:42
3.	"Ransom"	5:09
4.	"Easy"	4:01
5.	"No Crimes"	5:00
6.	"Pyre"	4:56
7.	"Enough of Our Machines"	5:09
8.	"Plan the Escape"	5:32
9.	"Lanterns Lit"	2:56

Bandcamp edition bonus track
No.	Title	Length
10.	"Pyre (Alarm Bells)"	4:14

iTunes edition bonus track
No.	Title	Length
10.	"Lost It to Trying (Mouths Only Lying)"	3:48

== Personnel ==
Credits adapted from liner notes.

- Ryan Lott – performance, recording
- Ieva Berberian – vocals (1, 3)
- Cameron Schenk – vocals (1, 6)
- Aaron Strumpel – vocals (1, 6)
- Shara Worden – vocals (1)
- Chris Thile – mandolin (1)
- Christopher Wray – pedal steel guitar (1), bass guitar (1)
- Jack Bashkow – saxophone (2)
- Steven Temme – saxophone (2, 4)
- Alex Sopp – flute (2, 5), piccolo (2, 5)
- Lily & Madeleine – vocals (2, 8)
- Rob Moose – violin (3, 5, 7)
- Elena Urioste – violin (3)
- Rafiq Bhatia – guitar (4)
- Cat Martino – vocals (5, 6)
- Nadia Sirota – viola (5, 7)
- David Stith – vocals (5, 8)
- Kate Davis – vocals (5)
- Peter Silberman – vocals (5)
- Darren King – drums (5)
- Noam Pikelny – banjo (7)
- Clarice Jensen – cello (7)
- Jonny Rodgers – tuned wine glasses (8)
- Joseph Branciforte – additional engineering
- DJ2 Kyriakides – additional engineering
- David Lai – additional engineering
- Paul Mahern – additional engineering
- Tomek Miernowski – additional engineering
- Eric Tate – additional engineering
- Anthony Ciannamea – artwork
- Ryan Sievert – artwork

== Charts ==
Chart (2013)	Peak position
Belgian Albums (Ultratop Flanders)	147
US Heatseekers Albums (Billboard)	13
US Vinyl Albums (Billboard)	6
