= Ian Chang =

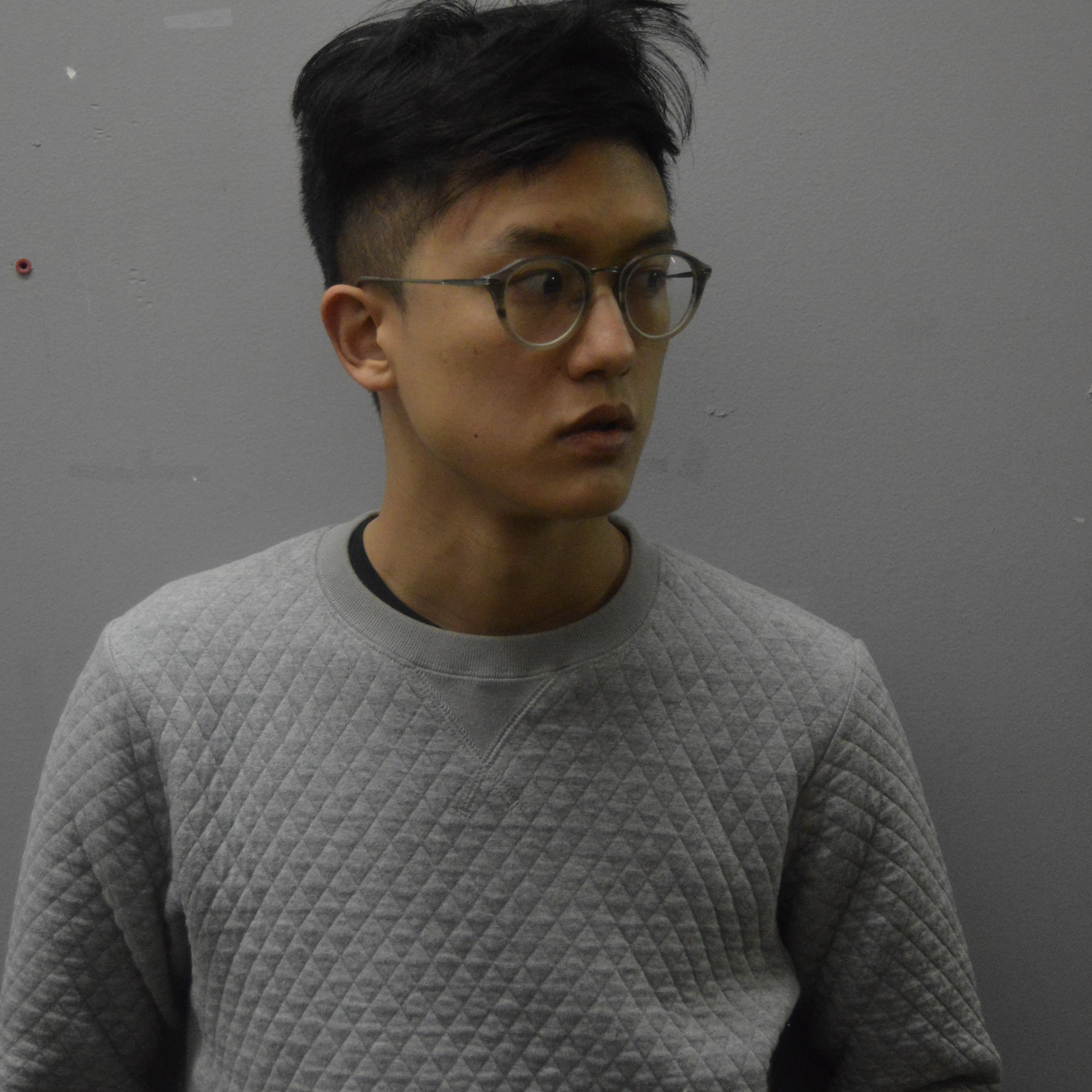
- Chang in 2016

Background information
- Born: October 7, 1988 (age 37); British Hong Kong
- Genre: Post rock
- Occupations: Musician; record producer
- Instrument: Drums
- Member of: Son Lux
- Website: www.ianchangmusic.com

Ian Chang (born 7 October 1988) is a musician, drummer, and producer. He is the drummer of the American experimental rock band Son Lux as well as Landlady.

As a solo artist, he has recorded three solo EPs: Spiritual Leader (2017), Romeo Remixes (2018), and Inhaler Remixes (2018), and released his debut full-length album 属 Belonging in 2020. Chang has also worked with musicians Moses Sumney, Joan as Policewoman, Matthew Dear, Kazu Makino, Dave Douglas, and Chvrches.

== Career ==
As a child, Chang studied classical piano and percussion at the Hong Kong Academy for Performing Arts. He and his family moved to New Jersey in 2007 where he continued studying music and exploring New York City. He attended New York University where he received an undergraduate degree in jazz drumming in 2011.

Chang began playing in the band Landlady in 2010 and by 2015 he was a key part of Son Lux and traveling in Europe with noted jazz musicians. He was a member of Body Language from 2010 to 2016. Chang lives in Dallas, Texas, where he continues to explore an "international musical language."

== Discography ==
=== As Ian Chang ===
- Spiritual Leader (2017)
- Romeo Remixes (2018)
- Inhaler Remixes (2018)
- Belonging (2020)

=== With Son Lux ===
- Bones (2015) – 12" vinyl, CD, digital – Glassnote
- Stranger Forms (2016) – digital – Glassnote
- Brighter Wounds (City Slang, 2018)
- Tomorrows I (City Slang, 2020)
- Tomorrows II (City Slang, 2020)
- Tomorrows III (City Slang, 2021)

=== Soundtracks ===
- Son Lux, Original Score for "Everything Everywhere All at Once" (2021)
