= Work That Mutha Fucker =

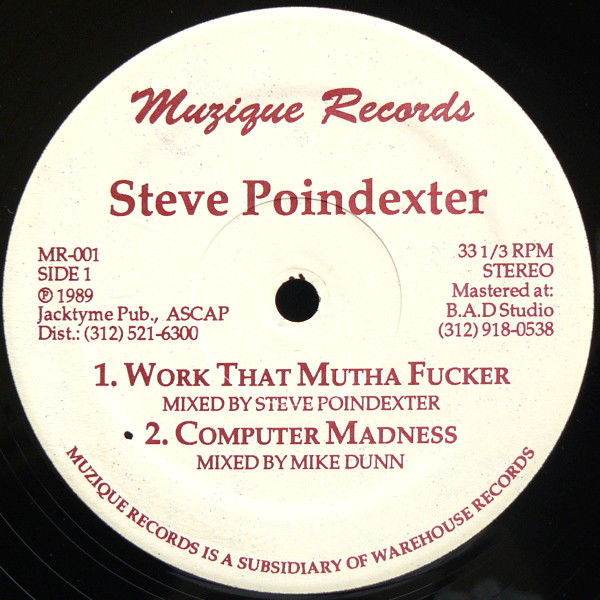

EP by Steve Poindexter
- Released: 1989
- Genre: House; ghetto house; acid house
- Length: 19:56
- Label: Muzique Records
- Producer: Steve Poindexter

Steve Poindexter chronology
Work That Mutha Fucker (1989)	Short Circuit (1989)

Work That Mutha Fucker is the debut EP by American house producer Steve Poindexter, released in 1989. The EP was the first release on Muzique Records, a sub-label of Armando's Warehouse Records. The title track was played by DJs in Chicago "a year and a half" before the vinyl release came out, Poindexter recalled in a 2014 interview. In 2013, it was re-released on Dance Mania. In 2022, Rolling Stone ranked "Work That Mutha Fucker" number 66 in their list of the "200 Greatest Dance Songs of All Time".

== Composition ==
The title track was built on the Casio RZ-1 drum machine and features Poindexter's repeated "work that motherfucker" vocal sample. The sample was recorded onto a DOD sampling foot pedal, which was triggered by the high tom from the Casio drum machine.

== Reception ==
The EP has been cited as a classic release of Chicago house music, and hugely influential on the ghetto house genre.

In 2015, ghetto house producer DJ Deeon listed "Computer Madness" from the EP as one of his top five ghetto house tracks. Deeon described the track as "the classic foundation and inspiration for underground music from Chicago's Southside" and recalling that "it made me want to make tracks like that".

"Computer Madness" was featured on Warp 10+1: Influences, a 1999 2-CD compilation of music that influenced artists on the record label Warp.

== Track listing ==
All tracks are written by Steve Poindexter.

Side A
No.	Title	Length
1.	"Work That Mutha Fucker"	5:29
2.	"Computer Madness"	4:17

Side B
No.	Title	Length
3.	"Chillin' With the P"	4:49
4.	"Born to Freak"	5:19

== Personnel ==
Adapted from the Work That Mutha Fucker label.

- Steve Poindexter – mixing on "Work That Mutha Fucker" and "Born to Freak"
- Mike Dunn – mixing on "Computer Madness" and "Chillin' With the P", acid line on "Born to Freak"
