= Steve Poindexter =

American house producer and DJ (born 1965)

- Born: 1965 (age 60–61); Chicago, Illinois, United States
- Genres: House; ghetto house
- Occupations: musician; producer; songwriter; DJ
- Years active: 1975-present
- Labels: Muzique; Trax; Djax-Up-Beats; Dance Mania

Steve Poindexter (born 1965) is an American house producer and DJ. He is best known for his 1989 track "Work That Mutha Fucker", which is considered to be one of the first Chicago ghetto house tracks.

== Early life ==
Poindexter was born in 1965. His father was a jazz drummer and his mother was a backup singer for Mahalia Jackson.

In 1975, at the age of ten, Poindexter started DJing for Saturday night parties held at Mendel High School on the South Side of Chicago.

== Career ==
Inspired by Jesse Saunders' "On and On", Poindexter and his cousin John Hunt started experimenting with drum machines and began creating edits to play at parties.

Poindexter's first record, the Work That Mutha Fucker EP, came out in 1989 as the first release on his and Armando's label Muzique Records. The title track, built on the Casio RZ-1 drum machine and featuring Poindexter's repeated "work that motherfucker" vocal sample, is considered to be an iconic ghetto house track and hugely influential on the genre. Ghetto house producer DJ Deeon listed "Computer Madness" from the EP as one of his five top ghetto house tracks, describing Poindexter as "a leading legend in this shit" for his generation of house producers.

== Discography ==
Albums

- Man at Work (1996)

EPs

- Work That Mutha Fucker (1989)
- Short Circuit (1989)
- Phase II (1991)
- Chaotic Nation (1991)
- 190 Octane (1993)
- Demolition Man (1997)
- Rise (1999)
- The State of Shock EP (2010)
- Street Fighter EP (with Johnny Key and Trackmaster Scott (2015)
- Classic Collection, Vol 1 (2016)
