= Teklife =

Music collective & record label

- Founded: 2003-04 (GhettoTeknitianz); 2011 (as Teklife)
- Founder: DJ Rashad, DJ Spinn
- Genre: footwork, Chicago juke, Ghetto House
- Country of origin: United States
- Location: Worldwide
- Official website: http://www.teklife57.com

Teklife (commonly stylized as Teklife57) is an electronic music collective and record label from Chicago, Illinois. The group was founded by Rashad Harden (DJ Rashad) and Morris Harper (DJ Spinn) in 2011 in the city's suburbs, but rapidly gained traction among international audiences for pioneering the dance music genre footwork (also known as Chicago juke), a sped-up derivation Ghetto house which itself had been a local flavour of house music.

== Etymology ==
As early as 2003, the group began releasing music as GhettoTeknitianz (shortened to GhettoTekz) with members identifying as Architeks. The name was later changed to Teklife in 2011, when some members of the group raised concerns over "losing opportunities from the word "Ghetto" in their name".

A 2016 study titled "The Sonic Ecology of Footwork" suggests that the term "Teknitian" implies a desire for the music to be viewed "as a means of production for an "urban ecology" [...] that is manufactured in the relations between dance, sound, territory, race, and class".

The number 57 is often featured as reference to the longtime collaboration with French visual artist and close friend of the group, Ashes57.

== History ==
=== Early years ===
The group's founders met as teenagers in 1995 during their time at Thornwood High School, when Harper had first noticed Harden mixing at the Markham Roller Rink alongside fellow Teklife veteran DJ Gant-Man. They bonded over music production with a particular focus on sampling on an MPC as much of the music they listened to at house parties was being released by Dance Mania Records. The label, whose roster included Gant-Man, had been particularly known for remixing popular tracks through a time-stretching technique of layering sampled vocals over a faster tempo averaging around 140 beat per minute, translating into what was the era's ghetto house movement.

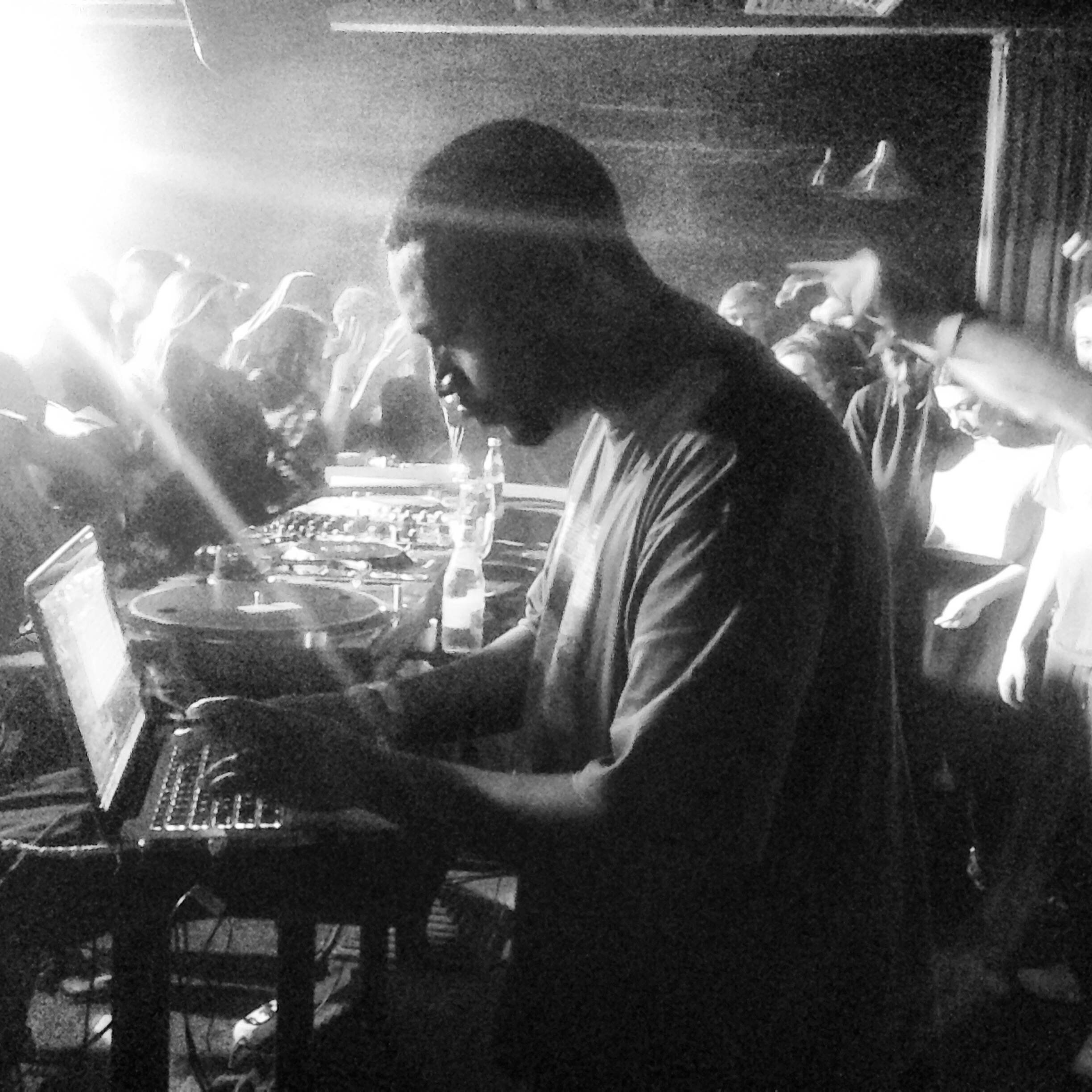
DJ Rashad in Moscow, 2013

Rashad and Spinn became involved with other members in the late 1990s and early 2000s at the Battlegroundz on 87th street in South Side, Chicago, where footwork dancers faced off against one another to the beats produced and played by the duo. Many members that later joined the collective like DJ Earl and DJ Taye had been or continue to be dancers from the Battlegroundz. House had long been the music of choice played at these events until Ghetto House emerged on the scene as dancers expressed a desire for faster rhythms. Eventually, dancers requested something even faster, "something crazy, something unexpected", as DJ Rashad recalled in an interview with Red Bull Music Academy in 2011, so they implemented the syncopated rhythms and 160 BPM standard tempo; both qualities which have now become staples of the footwork genre. In parallel, the release of RP Boo's "Baby Come On" in 1997 is often cited as one of the earliest juke tracks; a sub genre of ghetto house and direct predecessor to footwork. Today, the terms juke and footwork are used interchangeably.

The collective gained international recognition in 2010 on the release of Bangs & Works Vol. 1 (A Chicago Footwork Compilation) on British record label Planet Mu, which served as a spark for the formation of Teklife in 2011. In 2013, DJ Rashad released his debut album Double Cup on Kode9's London-based Hyperdub record label, which was met with critical appraise. Reverberations of the same sound that Rashad pioneered can now be felt across the world, with footwork becoming a popular style for producers and dancers as far as Japan and parts of Russia. The Battlegroundz format has also been replicated overseas, such as in Tokyo as Battle Train. The collective itself has subsequently grown to include members from outside Chicago like DJ Paypal, and from a variety of countries such as Slick Shoota from Oslo, Norway and Feloneezy from Belgrade, Serbia.

=== Teklife Records ===
Teklife Records was formed in July 2015, a little over a year after DJ Rashad's unexpected death left many in shock and mourning at the loss of one of the genre's innovators. Afterlife, the label's first release, is a posthumous compilation of tracks by DJ Rashad and his collaborations with other Teklife members–most of which had been left unfinished or unreleased by the time of his passing.

== Discography ==
=== Albums ===
- DJ Rashad, Afterlife (2016)
- DJ Earl, Open Your Eyes (2016)
- Taso, New Start (2016)
- DJ Manny, Greenlight (2017)
- Traxman, Tekvision (2017)
- Heavee, WFM (2018)
- Traxman, Tekvision Vol. 2 (2019)
- Boylan, Renegade (2019)
- Sirr Tmo, Juke Me Baby (2020)
- Gant-Man, Distorted Sensory (2021)
- Slick Shoota, Function (2021)

=== Compilations ===
- Teklife VIP (2016)
- On Life (2017)
- On Life Vol. 2 (2018)
- Teklife VIP XX (2020)
- On Life Vol. 3 (2022)

== Members ==
- DJ Rashad
- DJ Spinn
- Ashes57
- RP Boo
- Gant-Man
- Traxman
- Taso
- Heavee
- DJ Tre
- Boylan
- Litebulb (The Era)
- Feloneezy
- Jackie Dagger
- DJ Manny
- JP Durban
- TCJ
- Tripletrain
- DBK
- Mel G
- DJ Paypal
- DJ Chap
- DJ Phil
- Sirr Tmo
- Slick Shoota

== See also ==
- List of electronic music record labels
- The Era (dance crew)
- Chicago house
