= Zora Jones =

Austrian musician and visual artist

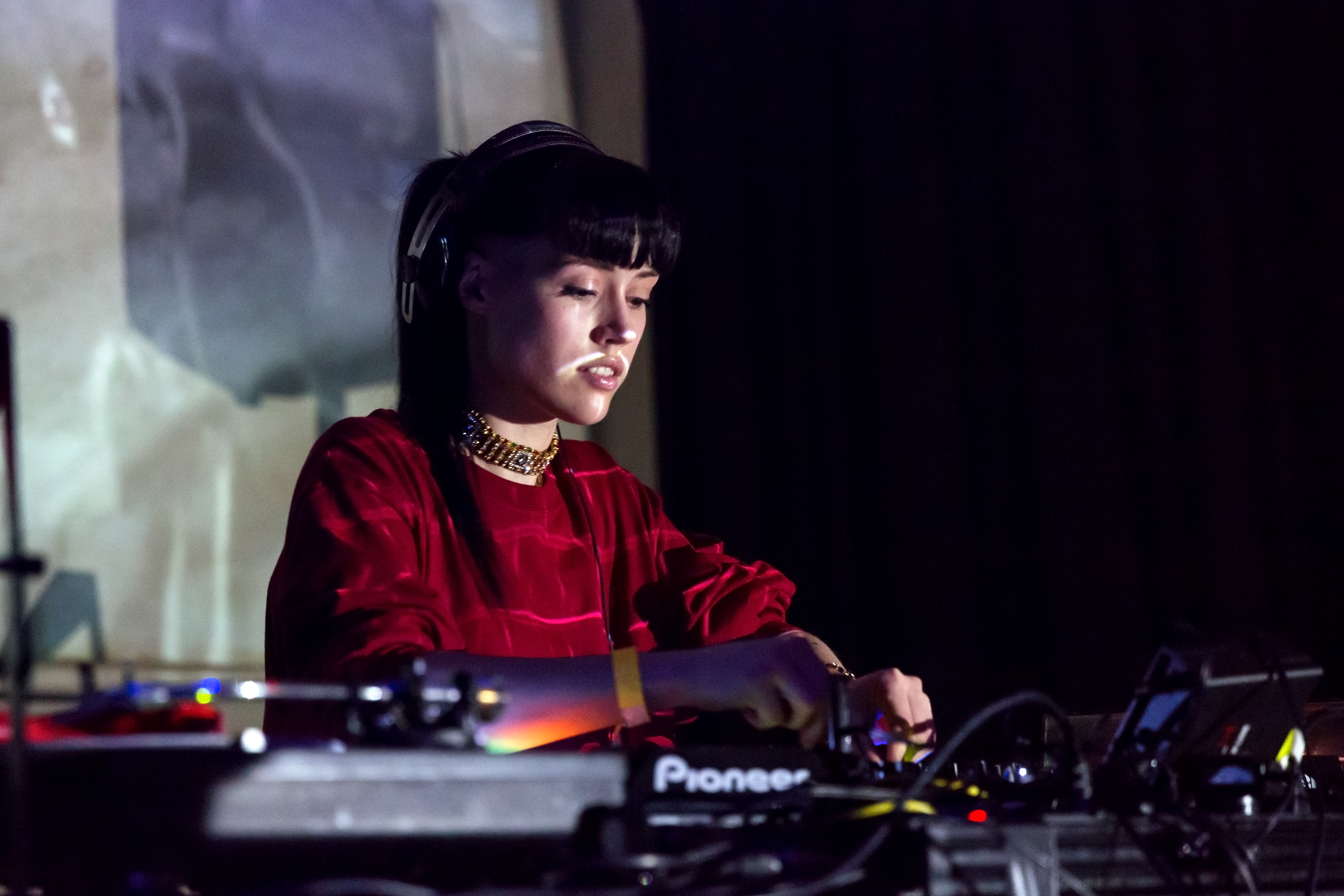
- Zora Jones at the music festival Electric Spring 2016 at Museumsquartier in Vienna, Austria

Background information
- Born: Austria
- Genres: Electronic music, footwork, Bass music, Experimental music
- Occupations: DJ, Record producer, Visual artist
- Years active: 2010–present
- Labels: Fractal Fantasy, Planet Mu, Bellyfat
- Website: zorajones.net

Zora Jones is an Austrian electronic musician, DJ, and visual artist. She is a co-founder of the audiovisual platform and label Fractal Fantasy (founded in 2014, currently on hiatus) and is known for integrating club-oriented production with computer-generated imagery (CGI) and digital world-building. Her debut EP 100 Ladies was released in 2015 via Fractal Fantasy, followed by her debut studio album Ten Billion Angels (2020), which received an 8.0 review score from Pitchfork. In 2018, she and Sinjin Hawke released the collaborative EP Vicious Circles through Planet Mu. In 2025 she launched her own imprint, Bellyfat, which she inaugurated with the collaborative singles Hoes Link Up/Abalone Kiss with Dj Polo, followed by her solo EP Angel Crisis (2026).

== Early life and education ==
Jones grew up on a farm near Klagenfurt in southern Austria. Her mother worked as an education sciences professor and was described as an influential Austrian feminist, while her father was an actor and musician; both encouraged her artistic interests from an early age. As a child, she studied music and learned drums, guitar, and violin (her preferred instrument). She also experimented with computer-based music-making at a young age, using audio software on an Atari computer with her father.

At 19, after visiting friends in Barcelona, Jones relocated there and studied fashion design at BAU, Centre Universitari de Disseny de Barcelona, while beginning to DJ and engage with the city's club scene. In 2010, she traveled to Montreal for a footwork event where she met DJ Rashad and Sinjin Hawke, an encounter she later cited as formative in her decision to begin producing her own music. Hawke moved to Barcelona in 2011, and Jones began producing tracks (including for use in their DJ sets) while learning Ableton Live.

== Career ==
=== Fractal Fantasy and 100 Ladies (2014–2016) ===
Jones and Sinjin Hawke founded Fractal Fantasy in 2014 as an interdisciplinary platform for computer graphics and audiovisual work, later expanding into a label and online experiment hub.

Following advice from Hawke, Jones chose not to publish music until she had produced at least 100 original tracks, using the process to refine her technique and develop a distinct style. Her debut EP, 100 Ladies (2015), consisted of seven tracks selected from that body of work and paired footwork tempos with melodic and R&B-inflected textures. The release was accompanied by a visual component, including imagery of synchronized dancing figures corresponding to the "100 ladies" concept.

In 2016, she released the single "Ruby Fifths" via Fractal Fantasy, featuring vocals from Teklife member DJ Heavee.

=== Collaborations, Vicious Circles, and Ten Billion Angels (2017–2020) ===
In 2017, Jones collaborated with footwork producer Jlin on "Dark Matter," released on Fractal Fantasy's audiovisual compilation Visceral Minds 2.

In August 2018, Jones and Hawke released Vicious Circles through Planet Mu, a seven-track collaborative EP and their first vinyl release under that project. Coverage highlighted tracks such as "God" and "Source of Conflict" for their maximalist, emotionally charged take on juke/footwork-informed club music.

Jones released her debut studio album, Ten Billion Angels, in September 2020 via Fractal Fantasy. The album consists of eleven tracks and was described as an extension and culmination of ideas developed since 100 Ladies. Pitchfork highlighted Jones's meticulous approach to sound design and her use of her own voice as a central element across tracks including "Paranoid" and "Sister's Blade." The release was also framed through the lens of Fractal Fantasy's "post-genre" approach, combining club music with immersive, internet-native visual presentation. Coverage in Telekom Electronic Beats discussed the album's CGI-driven presentation and interactive digital visuals released alongside the music.

=== Later releases and Bellyfat (2023–present) ===
In 2023, Jones released the single "Miau" featuring Japanese vocalist Golin via Fractal Fantasy.

In late 2025, she announced the launch of her own imprint, Bellyfat, described as a creative home for future releases. The label's first release was the two-track project Hoes Link Up / Abalone Kiss with DJ Polo, released in December 2025. In interviews, Jones said that she produced more music in 2025 than at any previous point in her career, experimenting with singing, songwriting, and new instruments, and pointed toward work on a second album.

== Discography ==
=== Studio albums ===
Year	Title	Label
2020	Ten Billion Angels	Fractal Fantasy
2026	50 Bullets To The Heart	Bellyfat

=== EPs ===
Year	Title	Label	Notes
2015	100 Ladies	Fractal Fantasy	Debut EP
2018	Vicious Circles (with Sinjin Hawke)	Planet Mu	Collaborative EP; issued on vinyl
2025	Hoes Link Up / Abalone Kiss (with DJ Polo)	Bellyfat	Two-track release
2026	Angel Crisis	Bellyfat	

=== Singles ===
Year	Title	Notes
2016	"Ruby Fifths" (featuring DJ Heavee)	
2017	"Dark Matter" (with Jlin)	From Visceral Minds 2
2020	"Paranoid"	From Ten Billion Angels
2020	"Sister's Blade"	From Ten Billion Angels
2023	"Miau" (featuring Golin)	
2026	"Ultrafreak"	
