= NEW YORK (band) =

Experimental art pop duo

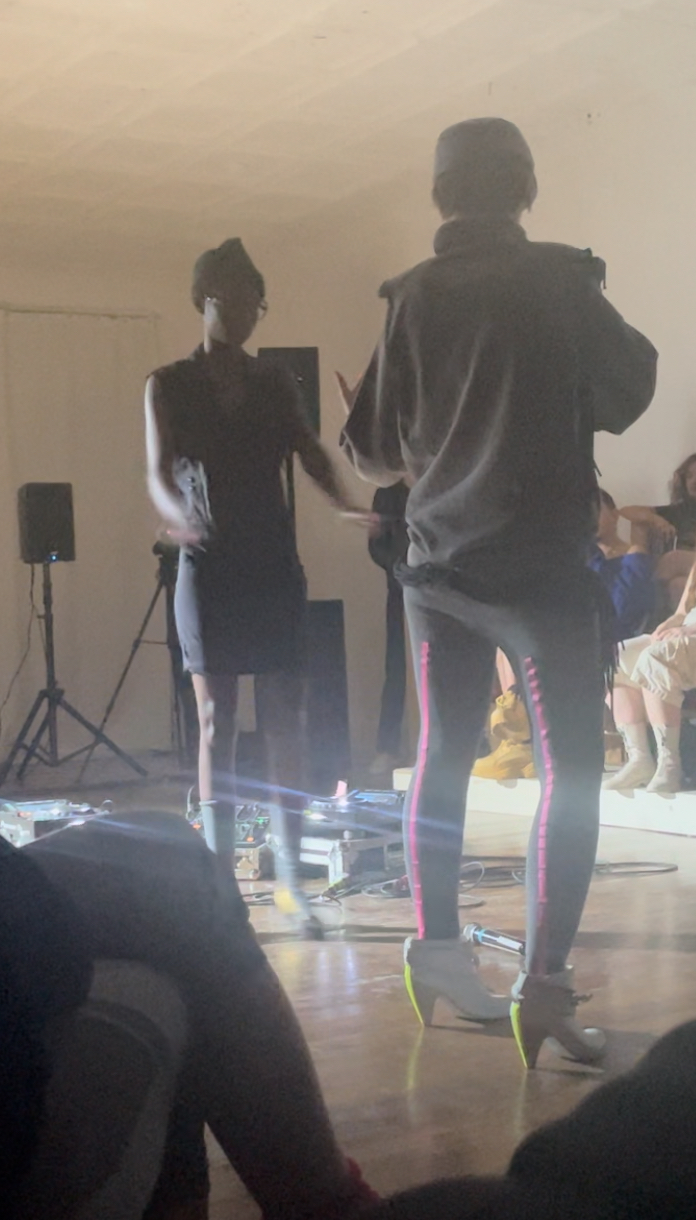
- NEW YORK performing at PAGEANT in East Williamsburg, Brooklyn on May 25, 2024

Background information
- Origin: London, England
- Genres: Art pop; Electro; experimental
- Years active: 2022–present
- Label: Relaxin Records
- Members: Coumba Samba; Gretchen Lawrence

NEW YORK is an electronic and art pop duo originally from London, consisting of artists Coumba Samba and Gretchen Lawrence. Both Samba and Lawrence work as contemporary artists; Samba grew up in Harlem and Senegal, and Phillips is from Estonia. Their debut album, No Sleep Till NY was released in 2022. The duo is known for using experimental sampling and disaffected vocal delivery in their music. As of 2025, the pair live in New York City.

== History ==
Lawrence and Samba met during the COVID-19 pandemic, after Samba moved into a council estate apartment that Lawrence was living in. The two bonded over shared musical references such as Electro, footwork, pop music, DJ Assault, M.I.A., Felix da Housecat, and DJ Rashad. The first beat that the duo made together used voice recordings of Coumba singing Taylor Swift and Chief Keef.

Both Samba and Lawrence have careers in the contemporary art world, with Samba primarily working as a sculptor, and Lawrence having a background in performance art and installation.

They have opened for acts such as Bar Italia, and Smerz.

== Discography ==
=== Albums ===
- No Sleep Till N.Y. (2022, self-released)
- Rapstar* (2024, Relaxin Records)
- Push (2025, self-released EP)

=== Singles ===
- night n day (2023, self-released)
- think of you / 2am (2025, self-released double single)
- together (2025, self-released)
