= 285 KENT =

Concert venue in Brooklyn, New York

Coordinates: 40°42′54.5″N 73°57′59″W

285 KENT was an "underground," all ages concert venue located at 269-289 Kent Avenue, in Williamsburg, Brooklyn, New York City. The venue was founded and operated by Todd Patrick a.k.a. "Todd P", beginning in 2010, ultimately closing in 2014 to much fanfare and media coverage. The venue was initially booked and exclusively managed by Patrick, later in partnership with Ric Leichtung, who created the event promotion entity AdHoc.fm, an offshoot of a music journalism website of the same name, to book the venue.

285 KENT operated under the DIY ethos and hosted acclaimed concerts and events spanning indie, punk, hip hop, electronic music, and other genres. The venue strictly hosted only all ages events at affordable ticket prices. 285 KENT held a standing-room only capacity of approximately 400 persons.

During its relatively brief tenure, Patrick and Leichtung sought to book 285 KENT to expand the community for DIY events beyond its traditional privileged, white, and straight audience; by seeking performances and partnerships with artists and event organizers representing LBGTQ+ communities and people of color. The venue hosted influential events such as the queer youth club night series "TOP 8," multiple performances by Chicago Footwork pioneer DJ Rashad, Blood Orange, Mykki Blanco, Grimes; and secret shows by artists such as hip hop collective Odd Future, queer R&B artist Frank Ocean, Harlem rapper A$AP Rocky, and others. The shoegaze rock band DIIV played so often they were almost considered the 285 KENT “house band”.

Previous to the opening of 285 KENT, the same unit housed the earlier creative spaces Bohemian Grove, a short-lived underground venue for electronic music events (operated by John Barclay who would later open the boutique Bushwick electronic music venue Bossa Nova Civic Club); and Paris London West Nile, a live/work loft and avant music and performance arts venue occupied communally by several artists and musicians.

The Paris London West Nile collective became the first to lease the unit shortly after its creation through partitioning of a larger warehouse, via association with artist and composer Zeljko McMullen, who worked as an artist's assistant to the musician Lou Reed. Reed and McMullen initially scouted the location and negotiated a lease to house a work studio for Reed, with McMullen taking the lease after Reed declined to occupy the space.

The larger warehouse 285 KENT occupied also housed the creative arts venues Death By Audio, Glasslands Gallery, Ran Tea House, Windmill Studios, the Muse, IndieScreen, and the Glasshouse Gallery, among others. The building's community of creative venue spaces were displaced in 2014 and 2015 by Vice Media, who acquired a lease on the majority of the building to house their headquarters. The building was constructed originally as a satellite structure to the historic Domino Sugar Refinery complex, located directly across Kent Avenue to the West.
