= PopGun Presents =

Music curation and venue management

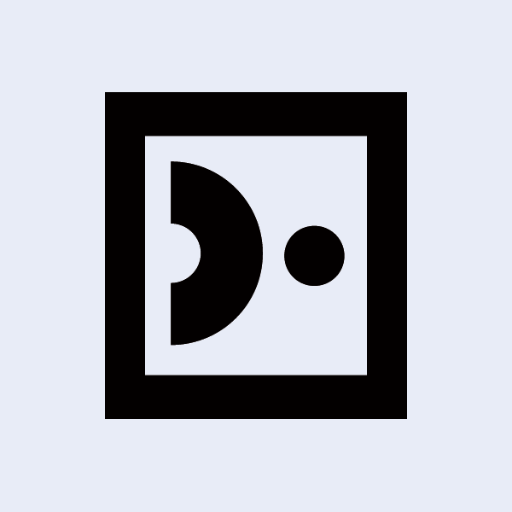
- Interactive map of PopGun Presents
- Former names: PopGun Booking
- Location: Brooklyn, New York
- Type: Events Company, Promoter

Construction
- Years active: 2008–2023

Tenants
- Glasslands Gallery; Elsewhere

PopGun Presents was an events production/promotion, music curation and venue management collective based in Brooklyn, NY. It was founded in 2008 by Rami Haykal-Manning (née Haykal) and Jake Rosenthal.

== Formation ==
In 2008, Haykal-Manning and Rosenthal started Popgun Booking, collaborating with the independent label Cantora Records on a residency at The Delancey on the Lower East Side of Manhattan called Loose Nukes. Das Racist, Savoir Adore, and Free Blood and were some of the bands that played during this period.

PopGun also acted as booking agents for some emerging artists including Anamanaguchi, Savoire Adore, Darwin Deez, Mon Khmer and others.

== At Glasslands and other venues ==
In late 2008, PopGun booked a number of one-off events at Glassland Gallery. They established a monthly event that featured acts such as The Secret Machines, Telepathe, Bear In Heaven, Hercules & Love Affair, Holy Ghost, and Marnie Stern, often presenting five or more bands performing late into the night. After several months, PopGun was offered control of in-house talent buying for Glasslands, making them the primary decision-makers for programming at the venue.

At Glasslands, PopGun produced shows primarily in the indie rock and alternative pop vein, branching out into electronic music, folk, hip-hop and heavy metal. Glasslands’ 300-capacity size and production quality attracted buzz artists as well as established acts. During this early period they frequently worked with Brooklyn-based artists such as MGMT, Chairlift, Dev Hynes and Yeasayer, while also importing national and international artists including Wild Nothing, Future Islands and Tame Impala.

In 2010, PopGun served as the in-house talent buying team for Santos Party House. With the online zine Stereogum, they set up Stereo Gun CMJ showcases. They continued working with Stereogum on the CMJ festival over the following two years at Glasslands.

Starting in late 2010, the PopGun website featured event photo galleries and a blog publishing periodic playlists, music features, and artist interviews. Artists profiled included Smith Westerns, Yellow Ostrich, Memory Tapes, Balam Acab, Parenthetical Girls, Yellow Dogs, Ex Cops, Open Mike Eagle, Teleman, ADULT., King Khan and The Shrines, and MØ.

== Owning Glasslands ==
In late 2011, Haykal-Manning and Rosenthal took ownership of Glasslands Gallery. PopGun moved its offices from 35 Meadow St in Brooklyn to the back of Glasslands and continued to make improvements to the venue, including new bathrooms, green rooms for the artists, and improved sound systems. As a result, the venue was able to attract more major touring acts.

Around this time, PopGun started pursuing more electronic producers and DJs, bringing in rising names like Baauer, Disclosure and Omar S for late weekend night parties.

During the era in which Glasslands was operating, PopGun remained active as a presenter and promoter for other venues throughout the city. They partnered with Le Poisson Rouge, a venue in Manhattan’s West Village, for a multitude of concerts, including Mount Kimbie, Clinic, Seinabo Sey, Jon Hopkins, and Angel Olsen among many others. Over in the East Village, PopGun placed Peelander-Z and Hard Nips at the newly opened Studio at Webster Hall, and Thee Oh Sees at Irving Plaza.

Shortly after the 2013 opening of Baby’s All Right in Williamsburg, PopGun also began presenting shows there, including Peaking Lights, Arlo Sparks, Dan Deacon, and The Japanese House.

== In Bushwick and Beyond ==
Glasslands closed on January 1, 2015 due to a building purchase by Vice Media. In the summer prior to the closing, Haykal-Manning and Rosenthal had been collectively named one of “Brooklyn’s Greatest Influencers in a Place Full of Music Influencers” by Brooklyn Magazine. The following year, Haykal-Manning was named one “20 People Defining Music” by the same periodical.

After the venue closed, PopGun moved its offices again to Bushwick, and continued to promote concerts at a multitude of venues. In July 2015, PopGun teamed up with Le Poisson Rouge to present Death Grips at the still-active Brooklyn Masonic Temple.

That same year, they began promoting shows throughout the Greenpoint neighborhood in Brooklyn, including at Warsaw, the repurposed Polish National Home. Artists included Shabazz Palaces, Liars, a Titus Andronicus and Ex Hex co-headliner, Julia Holter, Japanese Breakfast, Mount Kimbie, Mr. Twin Sister, and Nitzer Ebb. They also booked a number of events at the nightclub Good Room (in the space formerly known as Club Europa), including Kaitlin Aurelia Smith, and DJ sets by Ecuador’s Nicola Cruz and Australia’s Flume. Until the Brooklyn Night Bazaar closed in 2019, PopGun presented numerous artists at the venue, including G Herbo, SG Lewis, and Blank Banshee. At St. Vitus, which shuttered in February of 2024, PopGun installed shows by Les Savy Fav, Trans Am, Wavves, and Cold Cave.

Starting in 2016, PopGun partnered with the rebuilt Bushwick DIY venue Market Hotel for a number of shows, including the US debut of British grime star Stormzy, alt hip-hop collective clipping., and South London’s Kero Kero Bonito. 2016 also saw PopGun present dark synthwave bands TR/ST and Cold Cave together at Webster Hall.

PopGun curated a number of large-scale shows at The Knockdown Center in the Maspeth neighborhood of Queens, many of them copromoted with their venue Elsewhere. “PopGun & Elsewhere Present” highlights at Knockdown included a live play by Nicola Cruz, Swedish cloud rapper Yung Lean’s first play in the US since the COVID pandemic, and British jungle musician Nia Archives. In 2022, PopGun hosted two nights at Knockdown with the Swedish collective Drain Gang, whose artists Bladee and Ecco2k had just released internationally acclaimed albums. In July 2023, they teamed up with the British downtempo producer Bonobo for his Outlier series, the last event outside of Elsewhere to be presented under the PopGun name.

== Elsewhere and Merger ==
On June 29, 2016 the New York Times revealed that Haykal-Manning, Rosenthal and partner Dhruv Chopra were preparing to open Elsewhere, a 24,000 square foot venue and art space in Bushwick. The venue features five partitions: A 5,000 square-foot main room (The Hall), another 1,200 square-foot performance space (Zone One), The Rooftop, The Loft, and a ground-level event space called Chatroom.

PopGun’s team curated programming and led operations at Elsewhere, opening with a Halloween night party in 2017 featuring math-rock mainstays Battles. Concerts continued the stylistic thread established at Glasslands, with its leanings towards hypnogogic pop and indie rock, while also emphasizing newly emergent styles, notably the hyperpop movement. Shows at Elsewhere under the PopGun banner included Charli XCX (featuring Kim Petras, Dorian Electric, Caroline Polachek, CukpcakKe, and Brooke Candy), A.G. Cook, Jay Som, Neneh Cherry, HEALTH, Modeselektor, Helado Negro, Sheer Mag, Yelle, Beach Fossils, Waxahatchee, Madlib, TR/ST, 100 gecs, L’Rain, Kool Keith, ESG, Kim Petras, Empress Of, Iceage, Toro y Moi, Parquet Courts, and slowthai.

On July 25, 2024, PopGun threw a 15th Anniversary celebration at Elsewhere, the last show to carry the PopGun Presents name. Cecile Believe and Fatboi Sharif performed on The Roof accompanied by Swallowhallow DJing. In The Hall, performances were delivered by Tony or Tony, Elucid, and Anamanaguchi — the band that PopGun started representing when the company was founded — along with selector Heathered Pearls.

Soon after, the team that owned both the PopGun and Elsewhere brands made the decision to merge the two companies. Over the prior years, despite numerous high-profile concerts at other venues, the programming and operations at Elsewhere became their primary focus. However, the collective continued to organize events off-premises under the “Elsewhere Presents” label. Highlights have included Bladee at Avant Gardner in October 2024, and a number of events at Superior Ingredients in Williamsburg featuring the likes of Darius, Oklou, Yves Tumor, and Hannah Diamond.
