= Pitchfork Music Festival 2016 =

Music festival

- Dates: July 15–17, 2016
- Locations: Union Park, Chicago, United States
- Website: pitchforkmusicfestival.com

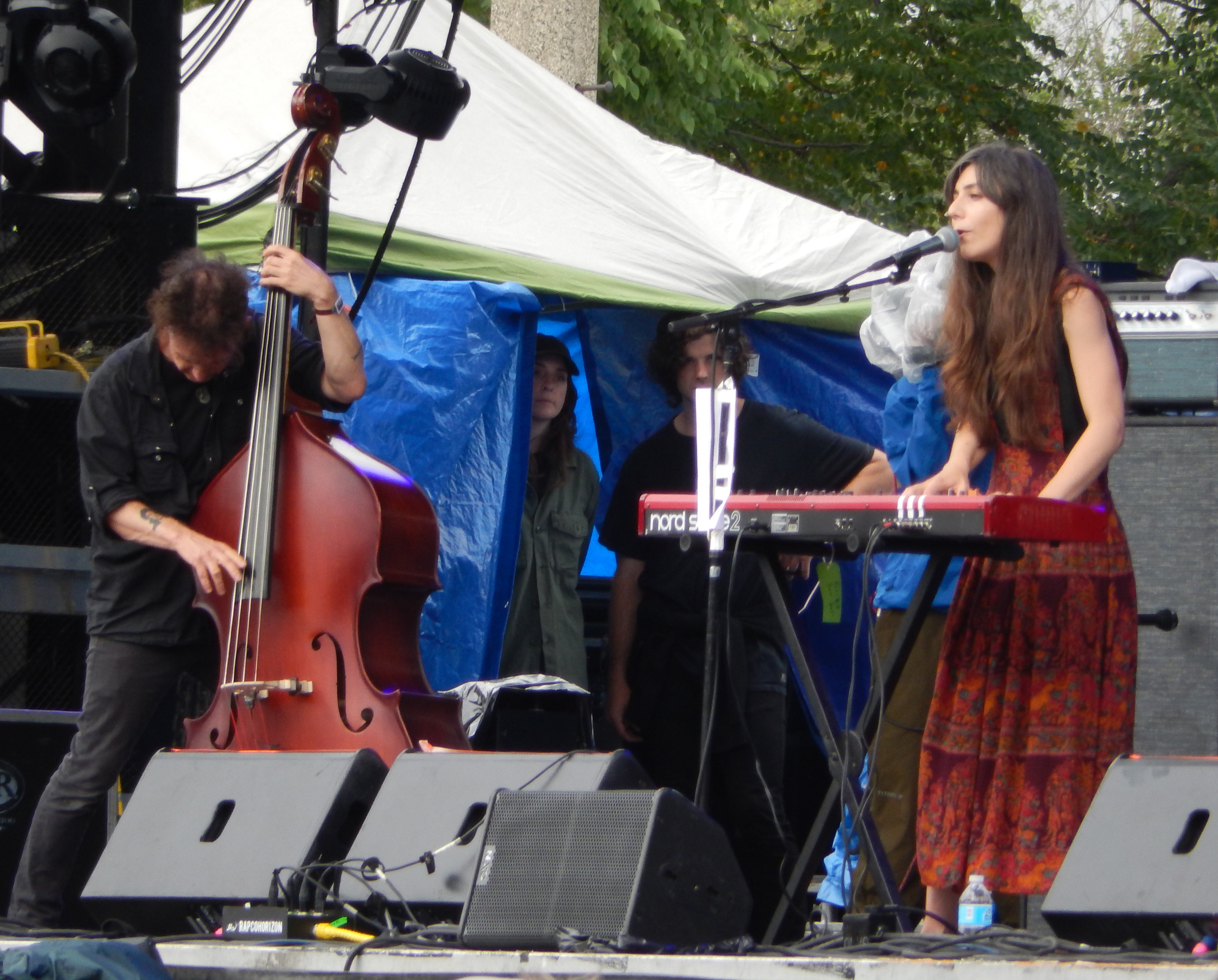
Artists performing at the festival

The Pitchfork Music Festival 2016 was held on July 15 to 17, 2016 at the Union Park, Chicago, United States. The festival lineup was announced on February 19, 2016.

== Lineup ==
Artists listed from latest to earliest set times.

Green
Friday, July 15	Saturday, July 16	Sunday, July 17
Beach House; Carly Rae Jepsen; Julia Holter	Sufjan Stevens; Super Furry Animals; Savages; Kevin Morby; Circuit Des Yeux	FKA twigs Jeremih; Holy Ghost! Woods

Red
Friday, July 15	Saturday, July 16	Sunday, July 17
Broken Social Scene; Twin Peaks; Car Seat Headrest	Brian Wilson (Note: Wilson performed a full set of The Beach Boys' Pet Sounds album.); Blood Orange; Digable Planets; Girl Band	Miguel; Neon Indian; Kamasi Washington; Porches

Blue
Friday, July 15	Saturday, July 16	Sunday, July 17
Whitney; Moses Sumney; Mick Jenkins; The Range; Shamir	Holly Herndon; Anderson .Paak & The Free Nationals; Jlin + RP Boo; Martin Courtney; Jenny Hval; Royal Headache; BJ the Chicago Kid	Oneohtrix Point Never; LUH; Oneman; Thundercat; The Hotelier; Empress Of; NAO; Sun Ra Arkestra
