= Double Cup =

Studio album by DJ Rashad
- Released: October 22, 2013
- Genre: Footwork; juke; pop rap; R&B
- Length: 56:24
- Label: Hyperdub

DJ Rashad chronology
Teklife Volume 1 – Welcome to the Chi (2012)	Double Cup (2013)	Afterlife (2016)

Double Cup is the first studio album by footwork musician DJ Rashad, and the sole full-length released during his lifetime. It was released on October 22, 2013 via Hyperdub. It has received critical acclaim as a pivotal album in the footwork genre.

== Background ==
The cover features a nighttime aerial shot of Rashad's hometown Chicago, designed by Rashad's friend Ashes57. Double Cup was named after a way to prepare the drug lean.

Several Teklife members contributed to the LP, with Rashad saying collaboration helped. According to collaborator DJ Spinn, many of the album's songs were ones he and Rashad had already created, then reworked over a seven to eight month period. Spinn said Double Cup was mainly recorded in his studio and their friend Taso's then-girlfriend's apartment in San Francisco, much of the time under the influence of cannabis.

== Reception ==
Professional ratings
Aggregate scores
Source	Rating
AnyDecentMusic?	7.1/10
Metacritic	79/100
Review scores
Source	Rating
AllMusic	5/5 stars
Drowned in Sound	8/10
Exclaim!	9/10
Fact	3/5
Mixmag	5/5
NME	8/10
Pitchfork	8.6/10
Resident Advisor	4.0/5
Rolling Stone	3/5 stars
Time Out	4/5 stars

Double Cup has received some acclaim from music critics. At Metacritic, which assigns a normalized rating out of 100 to reviews from mainstream critics, the album received an average score of 79 based on 13 reviews, indicating "generally favorable reviews".

Writing for Exclaim!, James Williams said the album contended for the freshest-sounding of the year, carrying the trademarks of footwork while incorporating new ideas. Drowned in Sound's George Bass commended Double Cup's accessibility and balance of electronics and drugs. John Calvert of NME said that "it's the sound of [footwork] at its most bonkers", praising the album's innovation in a genre that "reinvents itself on an almost weekly basis". Andrew Spragg of The Quietus complimented Double Cup as a "breakthrough" that demonstrates complexity, coherency and appeal, calling Rashad someone who "knows how to signpost a good legacy". Seb Wheeler wrote for Mixmag that the album is Rashad's "career-defining" work and contains some of his "most imaginative material" yet. Christian F of Fact criticized the album as being regressive due to what he saw as a less abrasive and more genre-diluted sound than Rashad's previous work, with Mike Powell of Rolling Stone saying that the music was "thrilling in five-minute bursts" but "a little tiring over a 50-minute LP".

DJ Rashad said the album's reception had him "stunned, flattered [and] blessed". Pitchfork placed Double Cup at number 35 on their 2014 list of "100 Best Albums of the Decade So Far" and at number 20 on their 2019 list of "The 200 Best Albums of the 2010s".

== Legacy ==
On December 8, 2023, a tenth anniversary edition was issued with a new album cover by the same designer. It included the previously CD-only bonus track "Last Winter", which received a new music video. On the album's tenth anniversary, many publications credited it with globally popularizing footwork, with Mixmag calling it "one of the most influential and innovative albums of the last decade". Some publications have retrospectively increased their original ratings for Double Cup, such as AllMusic changing their 4/5 to a 5/5, and Spectrum Culture changing their 2.5/5 to a 4/5 for the reissue.

== Track listing ==
All tracks are written by DJ Rashad.

No.	Title	Featured artists	Length
1.	"Feelin"	Spinn & Taso	4:30
2.	"Show U How"	Spinn	3:27
3.	"Pass that Shit"	Spinn & Taso	4:18
4.	"She a Go"	Spinn & Taso	3:37
5.	"Only One"	Spinn & Taso	3:46
6.	"Everyday of my Life"	DJ Phil	3:16
7.	"I Don’t Give a Fuck"		2:37
8.	"Double Cup"	Spinn	4:09
9.	"Drank, Kush, Barz"	Spinn	3:36
10.	"Reggie"		3:38
11.	"Acid Bit"	Addison Groove	3:25
12.	"Leavin"	Manny	4:14
13.	"Let U No"	Spinn	4:11
14.	"I’m Too Hi"	Earl	3:00
