= DJ Deeon =

American DJ and producer (1966–2023)

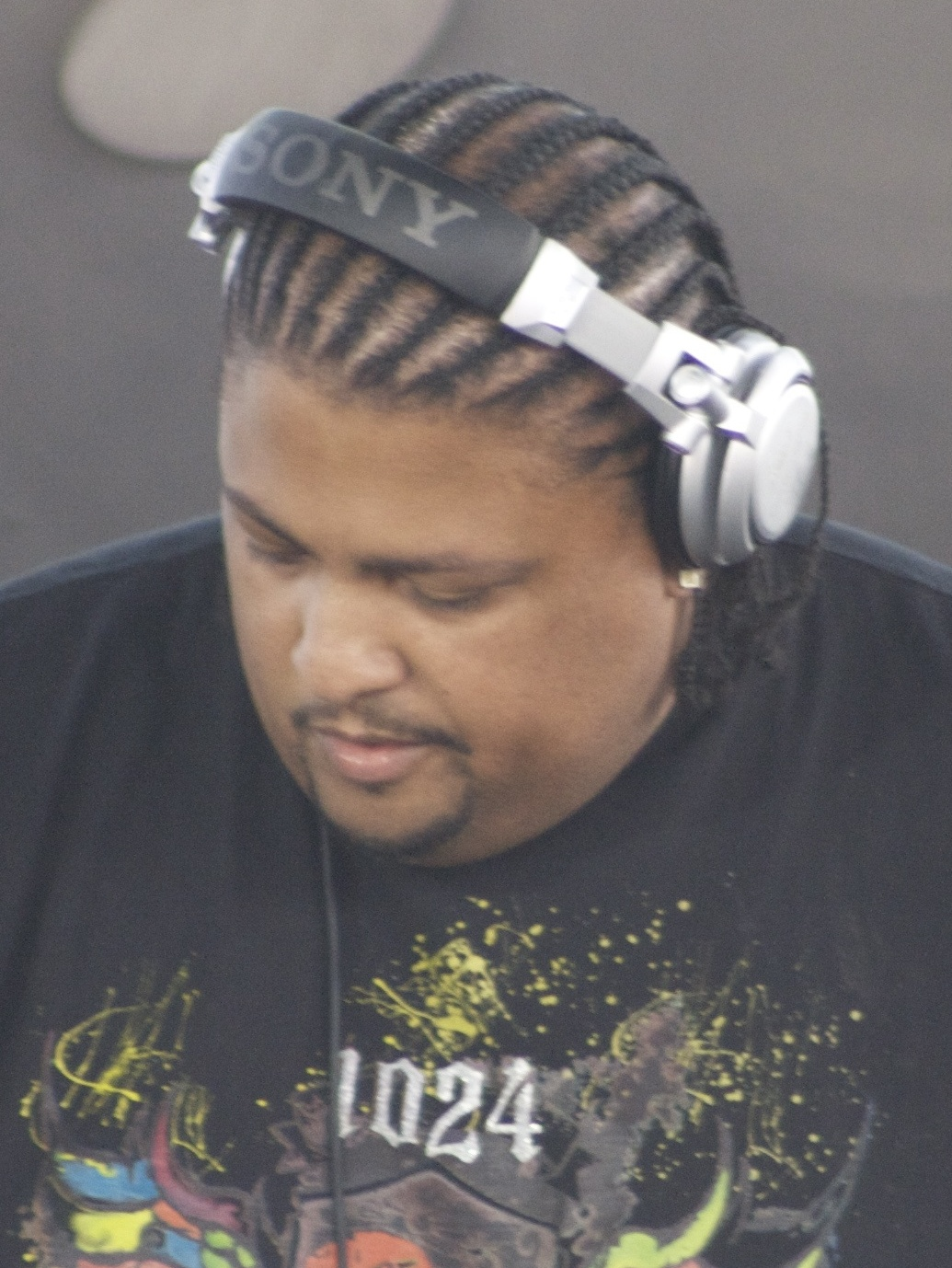
- DJ Deeon in 2009

Background information
- Also known as: Debo
- Born: Deeon Boyd; October 5, 1966; Chicago, Illinois
- Origin: South Side, Chicago
- Died: July 18, 2023 (aged 56)
- Genres: Ghetto house
- Years active: 1980–2023
- Label: Dance Mania

Deeon Boyd (October 5, 1966 – July 18, 2023), known under his stage name DJ Deeon, was an American Chicago house DJ, credited with pioneering ghetto house and helping create the Dance Mania label.

== Early life ==
Boyd was born in Chicago in 1966. Growing up in a housing project in the South Side, he became interested in electronic music after listening to "Numbers" by Kraftwerk off their 1981 album Computer World, later discovering house mixes on WBMX.

== Career ==
Boyd started DJing in 1980, with Boyd being influenced by Kraftwerk, John Rocca, and Soulsonic Force. He helped with the creation of the Dance Mania label with Ray Barney as well as creating the sound of ghetto house in the Chicago area.

Boyd released his debut EP in 1994, named "Funk City". After "Funk City", he released "Freak Like Me" in 1996, which is regarded as his most successful work. Boyd would continue to release music regarded as classics in the house genre, such as "Bomb 96", "2 B Free", "Wicked", "Back 2 Skool", "House-O-Matic" and "The Freaks". He was named in the Daft Punk song "Teachers" from their 1997 album Homework.

In 2015, the record label Numbers reissued four tracks from Boyd in the EP Deeon Doez Deeon!. In 2016, a remix of his track "Freak Like Me" by Lee Walker featuring Katy B and MNEK was released on Defected Records, reaching #80 on the UK Singles Chart. In 2021, Boyd released Destiny on the label Teklife, with the proceeds of the project going to DJ Rashad's family after his death in 2014. Starting from May 5, 2023, Boyd released four EPs over the span of 2 days, those EPs being "Bad Robot", "Glasgow to London", "My CPU" and "Space Age Digital Pimp".

== Personal life ==
In July 2020, Boyd launched a crowdfunding campaign for his health issues, having no income from gigs due to the COVID-19 pandemic and no disability benefits due to his previous touring. In June 2022, he revealed through his Facebook account that he had gone through amputation and pneumonia and was in an intensive care unit. A GoFundMe had started to cover his medical costs. On July 18, 2023, he died of undisclosed causes.

== Artistry ==
Boyd's style has been described as minimal and raunchy, a staple of the ghetto house genre. He personally described his work as "Get-freaky-with-a-stranger music. Girls kissing girls music. Stress-relief music." He was known for using the Roland TR-909 drum machine as the main backbone of his tracks, the instrument "pushed to the breaking point, asked to provide a waterfall of drum sounds".

== Discography ==
=== Singles and EPs by DJ Deeon ===
- Funk City (EP) (Dance Mania, 1994) – incl. "House-O-Matic"
- "Freak Like Me" (1996)
- Work This M.F. (EP) (DiKi, 1997) – with DJ Puff
- "Feel Good" / "Akceler 8" (Caution, 1998)
- "2 B Free"
- "Let Me Bang" (Databass, 2003) – incl. "Ride This MF"
- "The Freaks" (Juke Trax, 2005)
- "Debo G Chronicles Vol. 1" (Booty Call Records, 2013)
- "Debo G Chronicles Vol. 2" (Booty Call Records, 2013)
- "Wanna Go Bang" (Drumcode, 2022)
- "Bad Robot" (2023)
- "Glasgow to London" (2023)
- "My CPU" (2023)
- "Space Age Digital Pimp" (2023)

=== Music with contributions by DJ Deeon ===
- "Work It" by Dance System – DJ Deeon contributed vocals
