= DJ Funk =

American DJ (1971–2025)

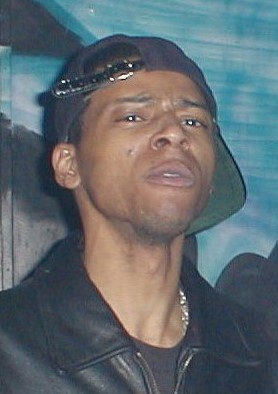
- DJ Funk in 2003

Background information
- Born: Charles E. Chambers III; January 25, 1971
- Origin: Chicago, Illinois, U.S.
- Died: March 4, 2025 (aged 54)
- Genres: House; rave; ghetto house
- Occupation: DJ
- Years active: 1989–2025
- Labels: Funk Records; Dance Mania

Charles E. Chambers III (Jan 25, 1971 – March 4, 2025), better known by his stage name DJ Funk, was an American DJ who pioneered the ghetto house subgenre of house music. Through the 1990s, he built a regional reputation in the Chicago-Detroit region and in the Midwest rave scene. His 1999 album Booty House Anthems was distributed nationally and sold over one million copies. He founded the Funk Records label in 2006. He is included in Modulations, a 1998 film documentary of electronic music.

DJ Funk died from cancer on March 4, 2025, at the age of 54.

== Discography ==
=== Albums ===
- 1992: Ghetto House Anthems
- 1993: Ghetto House Anthems 2
- 1999: Booty House Anthems
- 2006: Booty House Anthems 2
- 2013: Booty House Anthems 3

Additional album mixes:

- I Love Ghetto
- Freaky Stylz
- Freaky Stylz 2
- Mr. Big D**k
- Bootyology
- Booty Bounce 2000
- Guest appearance on DJ V's Juke-A-Licious Side A

Remixes

- Justice – "Let There Be Light (DJ Funk Remix)"
