= I'll Tell You What =

Studio album by RP Boo
- Released: July 6, 2018
- Genre: Electronic
- Length: 48:28
- Label: Planet Mu

RP Boo chronology
Fingers, Bank Pads, and Shoe Prints (2015)	I'll Tell You What (2018)

Singles from I'll Tell You What
- 1. "Back From The Future" Released: May 11, 2018

Professional ratings
Aggregate scores
Source	Rating
Metacritic	79/100
Review scores
Source	Rating
AllMusic	4/5 stars
Exclaim!	8/10
Pitchfork	7.8/10
PopMatters	8/10
Rolling Stone	3.5/5 stars

I'll Tell You What is the third studio album by American electronic musician RP Boo. It was released in July 2018 under Planet Mu.

== Release ==
On May 11, 2018, RP Boo announced the release of his third album, along with the single "Back From The Future".

== Critical reception ==
I'll Tell You What was met with "generally favorable" reviews from critics. At Metacritic, which assigns a weighted average rating out of 100 to reviews from mainstream publications, this release received an average score of 79, based on 11 reviews. Aggregator Album of the Year gave the release a 76 out of 100 based on a critical consensus of 10 reviews.

== Accolades ==
Publication	Accolade	Rank	Ref.
Tiny Mix Tapes	Top 50 Albums of 2018	22	
PopMatters	Top 25 Electronic Albums of 2018	21	

== Track listing ==
No.	Title	Length
1.	"No Body"	2:45
2.	"Back From the Future"	5:09
3.	"At War"	3:32
4.	"Cloudy Back Yard"	4:33
5.	"U-Don't Know"	4:46
6.	"Earth's Battle Dance"	3:14
7.	"Work the Flow!"	3:32
8.	"Bounty"	4:09
9.	"Flight 1235"	4:18
10.	"U Belong 2 Me"	3:00
11.	"Wicked'Bu"	5:07
12.	"Deep Sole"	4:23
