= Glasslands Gallery =

Defunct music venue

Coordinates: 40.713889°N 73.959722°W

- Glasslands
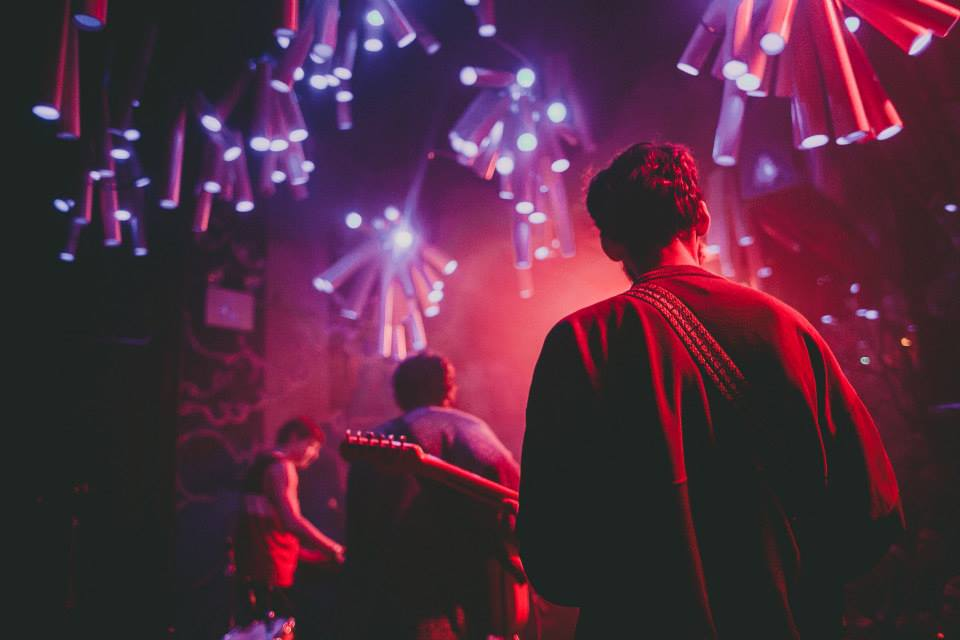
- Keepaway playing under the Glasslands tubes. Photo by Dylan Johnson
- Interactive map of Glasslands Gallery
- Location: 289 Kent Avenue, Brooklyn, NY 11249
- Type: Concert Hall and Nightclub

Construction
- Opened: 2006
- Closed: January 1, 2015

Glasslands Gallery (or simply Glasslands) was a music venue, dance club, and art space in Williamsburg, Brooklyn. Glasslands was founded by Brooke Baxter and Rolyn Hu in 2006, as a relocation of Baxter's earlier art space in the same building, Glass House Gallery. Hu and Baxter held the lease on the Glasslands space until 2012 when they made a turn-key sale to Rami Haykal and Jake Rosenthal of PopGun Presents, who had been managing bookings since 2009, and day-to-day operations since 2010. PopGun owned the business and lease for two years until the venue was displaced to be converted into Vice Media‘s office headquarters. As a concert venue, Glasslands was one of the longest-running of several 2000s independent creative venue spaces in the vicinity of the Williamsburg waterfront, which included 285 KENT, Death By Audio, Secret Project Robot, Monster Island Basement, B.P.M., Live With Animals Gallery, the Rock Star Bar, and many others.

== Glass House Gallery and the beginning of Glasslands (2004–2006) ==
In 2004, multi-media artists Leviticus and Brooke Baxter, associated with the Freestyle Family, founded Glass House Gallery at 38 South 1st St. The space featured a fluid and frequently changing layout as well as free expressionistic painting, and hosted performance art and music initially geared towards the founders’ friends in the Williamsburg creative community, but soon incorporating rental events featuring touring musical acts booked by local promoters, principally DIY promoter Todd P. As notoriety grew with increasingly higher-profile touring acts, Glass House began to attract attention within Williamsburg's music scene, and the venue became sought for local bookings by bands, such as Grizzly Bear, Kyp Malone of TV on the Radio, Matt and Kim, Deerhunter, Adam Green, Kimya Dawson, and Julianna Barwick. Chairlift‘s Caroline Polachek recalls, “It was a graffiti-covered warehouse space without a stage, and people watched from a rickety loft balcony that I was sure was going to collapse while Japanther was playing.”

Visual artists exhibited at Glass House Gallery included Erica Magrey, Brooke Borg, and DNA (Aaron Almendral and Mariano Delgado). On Friday nights, the gallery held free “art jam hangouts” where all who attended were encouraged to collaborate. In May 2006, Baxter partnered with musician and artist Rolyn Hu to open The Glasslands Gallery at 289 Kent Ave, a larger partition of the same warehouse complex where Glass House was located. A monthly lecture series, concerts, rotating art installations, community fund-raising events, workshops, and a free after-school program were all part of the space's stated mission. The layout at the time included a “typewriter room”, a “painting room” and the “lounge/conversation room.” Practice rooms for bands were also incorporated.

== Brooke Baxter and Rolyn Hu open The Glasslands Gallery (2006–2011) ==
Glasslands was double in size to the Glass House and more hospitable for performances, with better sound and seating. The newly dedicated concert-hall venue operated for “all ages” and without a liquor license for its first year, with events booked by Todd P, as well as by Akwetey of the band Dragons of Zynth. Todd P parted ways with Glasslands after a decision was made that the venue would become "21+" for entry, following the issuance of its liquor license. Some of the earliest performances included Vampire Weekend, a secret show by the Yeah Yeah Yeahs, as well as emerging acts like Pterodactyl, Bon Iver, MGMT and Dirty Projectors. DJ Jonathan Toubin would hold his New York Night Train parties and Soul Clap Dance-Offs at the venue. The Village Voice dubbed Glasslands the “Best Arts Venue Conjuring Avenue A in The 80s“.

In October 2009 Baxter and Hu opened a piano bar and restaurant called The Manhattan Inn in Greenpoint. At this time, Rami Haykal and Jake Rosenthal of PopGun Presents were made the in-house talent buying team at Glasslands.

Later that year, Glasslands hosted Minority Fest, an event organized by Ashok Kondabolu and the members of Das Racist. Minority Fest featured a panel discussion — moderated by Das Racist — of artists, academics, comedians, and writers discussing their careers and the issues they face as creators of color. Stand-up comedians Ali Wong, Kumail Nanjiani, Hari Kondabolu, Victor Varnado, Sheng Wang, and others performed. Panelists included Julianne Escobedo-Shepherd, Dallas Penn, and Jay Smooth.

2011 saw major renovations, including the movement of the stage to the far back corner, along with the removal of rehearsal spaces to allow for a greater audience capacity. During these early years at Glasslands, the venue had a penchant for booking artists that promulgated an often noisy or psychedelic brand of alternative pop, a sound that would become one of Williamsburg's major cultural exports. These acts included Yeasayer, Toro y Moi, Blood Orange, Chairlift, Tanlines, Twin Shadow, Das Racist, Bear in Heaven, Titus Andronicus, Phantogram, Caribou, Jay Reatard, Wild Nothing, Lemonade, Suckers, Keepaway, Phosphorescent, Passion Pit and Gang Gang Dance. In 2011, Lana Del Rey played a secret practice gig under the moniker Queen Of Coney Island.

== Fully functioning venue and club (2011–2014) ==
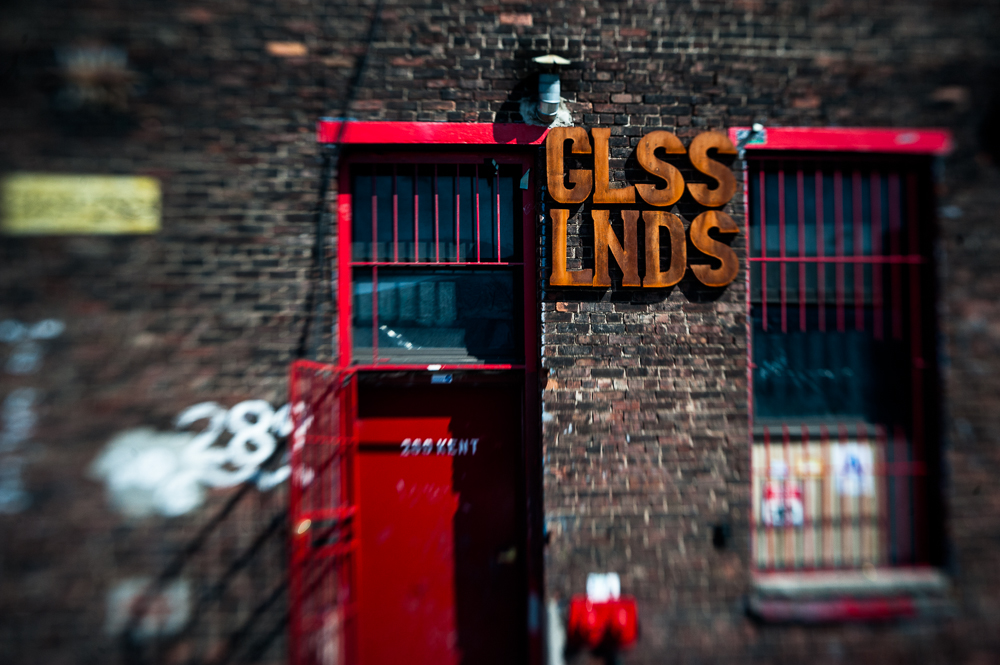
Glasslands exterior. Photo by Ryan Muir

In the years prior to the transfer of ownership, PopGun increased the frequency of booked shows, eventually reaching a point where Glasslands was booked with events virtually every night, save holidays. A green room for artists and coat check were installed as well. In 2012, ownership of Glasslands was transferred to PopGun's Rosenthal and Haykal.

Glasslands’ continual improvements and augmentations allowed for it to book some national touring acts looking for an intimate space with some underground credibility. FKA twigs, Disclosure, WU LYF, SZA, Angel Olsen, Charli XCX, Darkside, Grimes, Alt-J, Franz Ferdinand, The Clean and Nils Frahm were some of these acts.

Vashti Windish's paper clouds installation, which had hung above the stage since 2008, was declared by the New York Fire Department to be a fire hazard. It was replaced with a large array of controllable LED tube clusters, designed by Noah Norman of Ancillary Magnet and built by the Glasslands management and their friends. The clouds were memorialized in the design for Glasslands’ first T-shirts, made available at the venue and online shortly after the installation's removal.

In July 2013, Glasslands announced that they had upgraded to a Danley Labs Inc. sound system. Under PopGun's leadership, the venue took on more late-night parties with a DJ focus. These included select dates with DJ Jonathan Toubin as well as a monthly residency with the neo-disco and house collective Discovery. The themed Cat Face and Rebel Bingo nights found a home at Glasslands, as did the Brooklyn Electronic Music Festival. The Adventure[s] team also put on a number of notable parties including the season Robyn-themed party, an emo Valentine's dance, and a Twin Peaks-themed Halloween party. Major electronic acts and DJs including Jon Hopkins, Baauer, Mister Saturday Night, Omar S., and Sophie (PC Music) all made memorable stops. Bands that made repeated stops during this period include Unknown Mortal Orchestra, How to Dress Well, Crocodiles, Empress Of, Cecile Believe (then Mozart's Sister), Lower Dens, Dum Dum Girls, Le1f, Torres (musician), The Range, DIIV, Trust, Shigeto, MØ, Hooray for Earth, Zambri, The Yellow Dogs, King Krule, Light Asylum, THEESatisfaction, Cloud Nothings, Anamanaguchi, Kelela, Mon Khmer, Air Waves, Majical Cloudz, Peelander-Z, Slow Magic, Mykki Blanco and Chrome Sparks.

== Closure ==
After the sudden closure of the neighboring venue 285 KENT in early 2014, as well as the announcement that Glasslands’ building neighbor Death By Audio would also be closing, rumors circulated in the press that Vice Media had its eye on the whole of the warehouse complex that contained Glasslands for its new headquarters. Press accounts reported that the print magazine turned conglomerate received a large tax incentive from the State of New York to remain in New York City. Glasslands announced on October 21 that New Year's Eve 2014 would be its last night of operation.

While neither Glasslands nor Vice publicly stated the exact reason for the venue's closure, the announcement resulted in an outcry against the media company, with many alleging that it was cannibalizing the alternative culture that allowed it to flourish. Others chalked it up to the inevitable onset of gentrification, pointing out that the landmark Domino Sugar Refinery across the street from Glasslands was being demolished to make way for luxury condo high-rises. Columns and features on the closing were published in The New York Times, Billboard, Paper Magazine, Gawker, Gothamist, The Fader and other outlets.

In its final weeks of operation, Glasslands harkened back to its art gallery roots, bringing in Collective Craft NYC to install works by visual artists Jillian Siegel, Courtney McKenna, Grant Guilliams, Ashley Blanton and more. Annalise Yuri Murphy, a projection artist, created a mapped visual installation projecting all the Glasslands Posters from opening to closing. Glasslands bartenders Luiza Kurzyna and Zachary Clausen also contributed new pieces, as did James Devito of Anamanaguchi and Kengo “Peelander Yellow” Hioki of Peelander-Z.

On December 15, 2014, Glasslands announced its final event “Lastlands” for New Year's Eve, and when tickets went on sale two days later they sold out instantly. The show's line-up – DIIV, Sky Ferreira, Smith Westerns, and Beverly – was not revealed until doors opened for the event. Recapping the night, Jen Carlson wrote, “RIP Glasslands. RIP Williamsburg. RIP Brooklyn. Etc.”

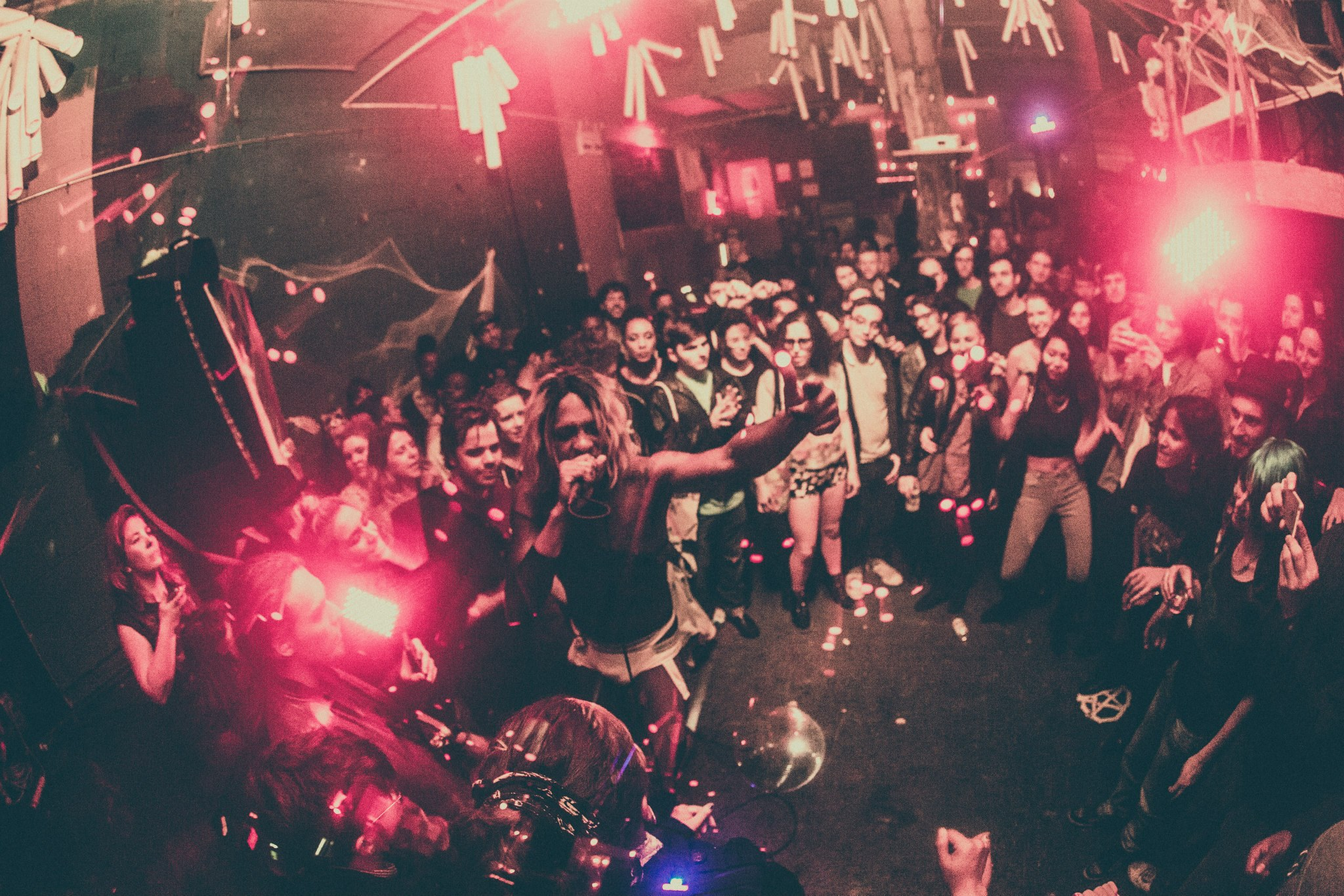
Mykki Blanco performs among the crowd. Photo by Dylan Johnson

== Trivia ==
- Glasslands was the setting of a scene in the episode “I Saw You” of the HBO show Girls. Scenes were also filmed for Blue Bloods, Sex & Drugs & Rock & Roll starring Dennis Leary, and the movie Song One starring Anne Hathaway, as well as a number of music videos and other productions. Footage from the Yeah Yeah Yeahs’ secret performance at Glasslands was used to create the official live video for their song “Isis”, released in 2007.
- Apart from Minority Fest, Comedians that performed at Glasslands included Trevor Noah, Hannibal Buress, Sasheer Zamata, Jo Firestone and Dylan Marron.
- A number of the venue's night staff were also musicians and artists, notably Celeste Cruz, Kitty, Cameron Hull of Suckers, Matthew Scheiner of Oberhofer and Mon Khmer, Angus Tarnawsky of Apache Beat and Flowers of Evil, Joe Stickney of Bear in Heaven, plus members of True Womanhood, Bodyparts, Klaus, Infinity Shred, Call of the Wild, and Candide.
