= Elsewhere (music venue) =

Music venue in Brooklyn, New York, United States

Coordinates: 40°42′34″N 73°55′23.5″W

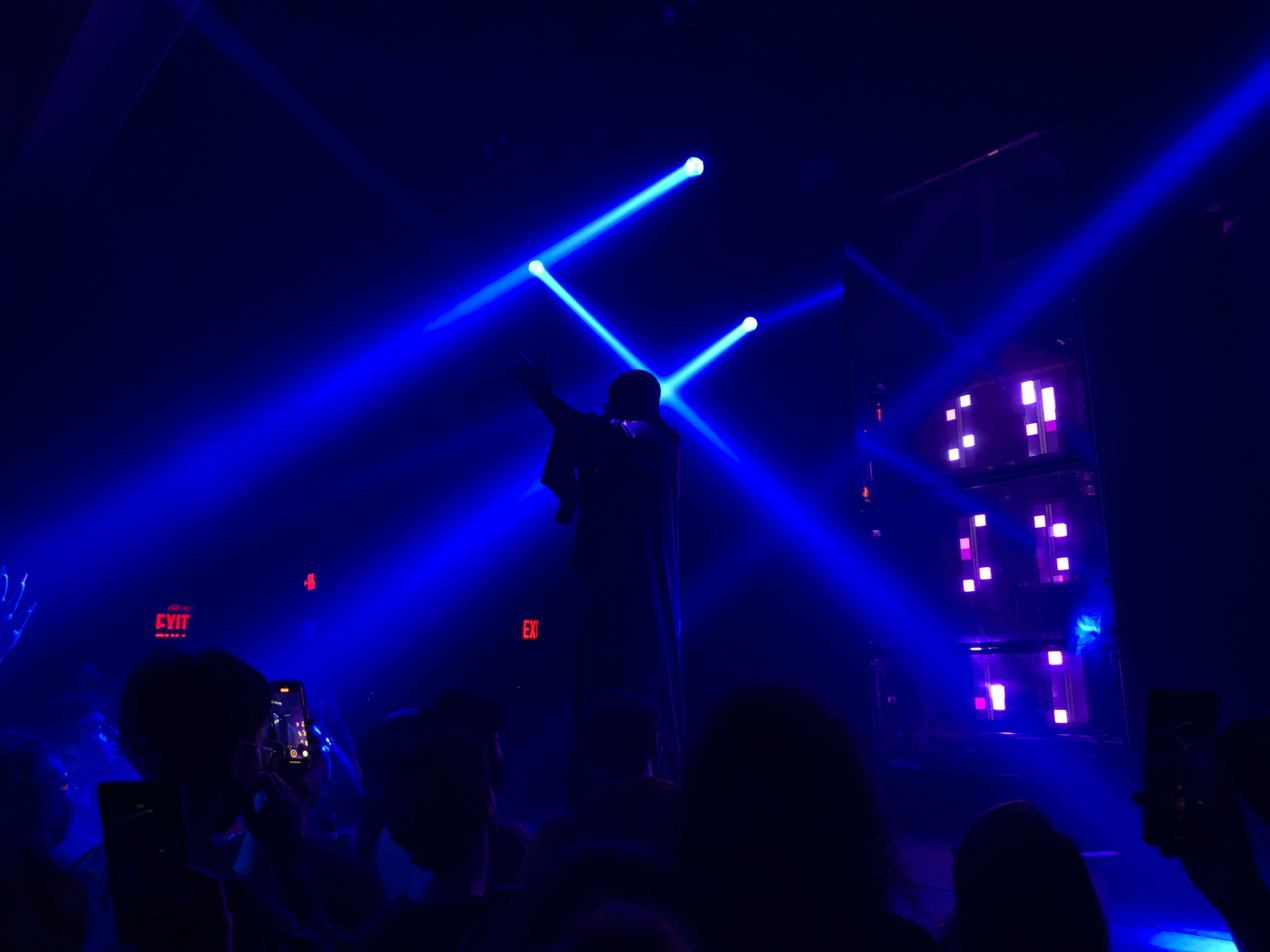
Genesis Owusu performed at Elsewhere in October 2023.

Elsewhere is a music venue in Bushwick, Brooklyn. It opened on October 31, 2017. It has five musical performance spaces. The venue is owned by the same individuals who owned Glasslands Gallery when it closed in 2014.

Elsewhere is in a renovated warehouse near the Jefferson Street station.

In May 2020 during the COVID-19 pandemic, a replica of Elsewhere was built in Minecraft and a digital concert was held as the physical venue itself was closed due to social distancing restrictions.

== Notable Performers ==
- FKA Twigs
- Charli xcx
- KATSEYE
