= Mike Dunn (musician) =

American DJ & record producer

- Origin: Chicago, Illinois, U.S.
- Occupations: DJ, producer
- Years active: 1983—present
- Labels: Blackball Muzik, Dance Mutha, Muzique Records, Warehouse Records

Mike Dunn is an American DJ and record producer from the Englewood neighborhood of Chicago. He has produced music, primarily house music, since the 1980s. Simon Dunmore of Defected Records described Dunn as "an OG, a don from Chicago, an original, a pioneer."

== Career ==
In the mid-1980s, Dunn performed live at parties using reel-to-reel tape recorders and drum machines while rapping and singing. Dunn's first recording release was "Dance You Mutha" on Westbook Records in 1987. His "Magic Feet" was one of the early 303-based acid tracks. He released some of the first hip house tracks, such as 1987's "So Let It Be Houze!". Around the same time, Dunn began producing and collaborating with other Chicago artists, including Armando, Fast Eddie, and K-Alexi Shelby.

Dunn's successful early tracks have been praised by Pitchfork for "their raw, urgent feel, with unvarnished drum machines wreathed in gnarly acid basslines and his signature crowd-stoking vocals." Aphex Twin has praised Dunn's Tracks That Move Ya, released on Muzique Records in 1989 under his The MD Connection alias, in interviews as part of a story about realizing "that such things are worth way more than money." After paying 30 pounds for Tracks That Move Ya when he was about 16 years old, "I've got this amazing record and you've just got pieces of paper in your hand."

Dunn co-founded multiple record labels (with Armando Gallopp) in the 1980s, including Warehouse Records, Dance Mutha, and Muzique Records. He signed a contract with Bad Boy Records in the late 1990s but never released a record with them.

More recently, Dunn has been the vocalist on tracks by Jax Jones ("House Work", which peaked at number 85 on the UK singles chart), Honey Dijon ("Work", "C's Up"), and Seamus Haji ("Serious"). He has produced tracks by artists such as Syleena Johnson ("Tonight I'm Gonna Let Go") and remixed tracks by artists such as Ten City ("Devotion").

Dunn joined the Chicago-based Chosen Few DJs group in 2012. They visited the White House in May 2016.

In 2017, Dunn released his second album, My House From All Angles, which was reviewed by the Financial Times, Guardian, Pitchfork, Q magazine, Resident Advisor, and Record Collector. He released a House Masters compilation on Defected Records in 2020.

In June 2024, Dunn announced the relaunch of his label, Dance Mutha, nearly three decades after its original founding.
