= Ron Trent =

American house music DJ and record producer

- Born: Ronald Trent; May 23, 1973 (age 53); Chicago, Illinois, United States
- Genres: House, Chicago house, deep house, Detroit techno
- Occupations: DJ, Producer
- Instruments: Turntables; Electronic keyboard Drum machine
- Years active: 1986–present
- Labels: Warehouse; Peacefrog; Prescription; Night Time Stories
- Website: Official Website

Ronald Trent (born May 23, 1973) is an American house music DJ and record producer.

== Music career ==
After experimenting with beat machines and a small keyboard in 1986, he began recording the track "Altered States" while still in high school. He released it on Armando's Warehouse Records in 1990. The track became a club hit among devotees of techno, despite Trent's grounding in the Chicago house scene. He then began working with Detroit producers such as Chez Damier, with whom he issued several singles before co-founding the label Prescription Records in 1993. They also worked with German duo Basic Channel.

Later in the 1990s, he moved to Brooklyn and put together a collaboration known as Urban Sound Gallery, or USG. He also worked with Anthony Nicholson there. He returned to Chicago in the 2000s.

== Discography ==
=== Singles ===
- The Afterlife (The Afterlife/Making Love/Altered States (Full Length Version) (Warehouse Records WR005, 1990)
- Love Affair (Four versions/Tribal Affair x 2) (Clubhouse Records CHR123 1992)
- States EP (Realtered States 1/Realtered States 2/Magic Women/Can We All Just Get Along?) (Cajual Records CAJ205, 1993)
- Dance Floor Boogie Delites (Pop, Dip & Spin/Morning Fever) (Prescription Records PRES114, 1995)
- A Dark Room & A Feeling (Seduction/Piano Track) (Subwoofer SUW006T, 1995)
- Foot Therapy (Prescription Records), 1995)
- In The Spirit (The Full Experience Mix/Kada Mix/Guitar Alchemy Mix) Peacefrog Records, PF086, 1999)
- I Feel The Rhythm (Prescription Records, 1999)
- Love To The World (The Full Experience Mix/Dub Mix/Drum) (Future Vision Records FV003, 2006)
- Look Beyond (Look Beyond Main Mix/Dub Mix) (Future Vision Records FVR 001, 2008)
- Journeyn2u (Journeyn2u/It's Hot) (Future Vision Records FVR 005, 2008)
- Cinematic Travels EP (From Above (Full Length)/Album Version/World Travels) (Prescription Classic Recordings PCR001, 2008)
- Wooden Floors & Analogue Memories (Woman, Africa Hi Fi Mix/Intoxicate) (Future Vision Records FVR 010, 2009)
- The Power Of Sound (Space Ship/The Power Of Sound) (Future Vision Records FVR 016, 2010)
- Spaces And Places E.P. (Babia/Sex Games/Sensual Drums) (Future Vision Records FVR 017, 2010)
- Lost Tribes Regained EP (The Clan Speaks/Oduworld/Open Roads) (Future Vision Records FVR 019, 2011)
- Dance Floor Boogie Delites (Tell Me/Work Your Body) (Future Vision Records FVR 020, 2011)
- Kids At Play (Single Sided Limited Edition 12") (Electric Blue EB 001, 2012)
- Humans Drums & Machines (Human League/Future Shock) (Electric Blue EB 002, 2013)
- Manifesto (Original Mix/Bewe Effect Mix/Aybees Blakspace Federation Slap Mix) (Future Vision Records FVR 021, 2013)
- Dance Floor Boogie Delites (CE100/Big Medicine/Never Too Far) (Future Vision Records FVR 023, 2013)
- YNF (You'll Never Find) (Future Vision Records FVR024, 2014)
- Humans Drums & Machines (Sub Culture/Movement 7) (Electric Blue EB 003, 2014)
- Evergreen (Urban Skylinez) (Apotek APT 021, 2014)
- Hi Life Jump (One Sided Limited Edition 12") (Electric Blue EB002LTD, 2015)
- Rawax Aira Series Vol 2 (Deep In The Stars/Rock The Box) (Rawax Aira AIRA 002, 2015)
- Humans Drums & Machines (Elements/Blazzin) (Electric Blue EB 007, 2016)
- Orbit 01 (Hooked On Your Love (1984)/Welcome (1982) (Bass Cadet Records ΘBCR01, 2016)
- Spaces And Places (São Paulo Sound Systems/New York City Country City) (MusicandPower MAP 002, 2016)
- Electric Moods & Long Play (Liquid Love/Liquid Love Reprise/Sound System Prevail) (MusicandPower MAP 003, 2016)
- Fon Space Project (Time And Space/Bass To Love) (MusicandPower MAP 004, 2016)
- Dance Floor Boogie Delites (Boogie Down/In The Light) (MusicandPower MAP 005, 2016)
- Humans Drums & Machines (Kinky City/Omi Tutu) (Electric Blue EB 008, 2017)
- Humans Drums & Machines (Dimensions/Beyond) (Electric Blue EB009, 2017)
- Spaces And Places (Berlin Nights/Mississippi Mud) (MusicandPower MAP 007, 2017)
- African Indigenous Rhythms (The Dawn/Power Movement) (MusicandPower MAP 008, 2017)
- Dance Floor Boogie Delites (Touch/Fresh On Your Love) (MusicandPower MAP 009, 2017)
- Gemini Jazz (Storyteller/The Touch/The Place Inside) (MusicandPower MAP 012, 2017)
- Dancin' Remixes (Headphoniq Q-013, 2018)

The following 12" Singles were released under the monikers R.T. Factor and R.T Sound Factor.

- 7th Heaven (Electric Blue EB 004, 2014). (One sided Limited Edition 12").
- Who Are We?/What Does It Mean? (Electric Blue EB 006, 2016)

The following 12" singles are collaborations with other artists.

- Afro Nova EP (Aquarhythmatica/Soul Samba Express) (With Anthony Nicholson) (Prescription Records PR-5010, 1998)
- I Fight For What I Believe (I Fight For What I Believe/Version/Beets) (With Sonti) (S I Project ADSI 011, 1999)
- Movin' On (Movin' On Vocal/Movin' On Instrumental) (With Robert Owens) (Need 2 Soul N2S 003, 2007)
- Deep Down (Deep Down (Main Vocal/Ron Trent Mix/Deep Down Dub) (With Robert Owens) (Future Vision Records FVR 002, 2008)
- Sensation(Main Vocal/Dub) (With Erik Rico )(Future Vision Records FVR 015, 2009)
- The Sound (Main Mix/Reprise/Dub) (Ron Trent & Manoo) (Future Vision World FVW 006, 2017)
- Parola Di Bocca #2 (Berlin Nights In Paris/Morning Factory (BA AS Deep Edit-Rework)/Love Is The Message (Kai Alce Edit)/I come here to be Happy (Kai Alce Edit) ) (Ron Trent With Kai Alice, Chez Damier) (Balance Traxx BT 002, 2017)
- Manchild (In The Promised Land) (Manchild (In The Promised Land) (Ron Trent Full Vocal Version)/Manchild (In The Promised Land) (Dazzle Drums Dub) ) (Ron Trent With Dazzle Drums & Lono Brazil) (BBE BBE443SLP, 2018)

=== Albums ===
- Primitive Arts (Peacefrog Records, 1999)
- Ancient Future (Village Again, 2007)
- Dance Classic (Prescription, 2009)
- Raw Footage (Electric Blue, 2011)
- Dance Floor Boogie Delites (Future Vision Records, 2011)
- What Do the Stars Say to You (Night Time Stories, 2022)
- Lift off (Rush hour, 2025)

=== DJ Mixes ===
- Mix the Vibe: Ron Trent Urban Afro Blues (King Street Sounds, 2001)
- Giant Step Records Sessions, Vol. 1 (Giant Step Records, 2001)
- Musical Reflections (R2, 2002)
- Deep and Sexy 2 (Wave Music, 2003)
- Abstract Afro Journey (King Street, 2004)
- Coast2Coast (NRK, 2007)
- Need2Soul, Vol. 1 (Need2Sou, 2008)
