= DJ Rashad =

American musician, producer and DJ

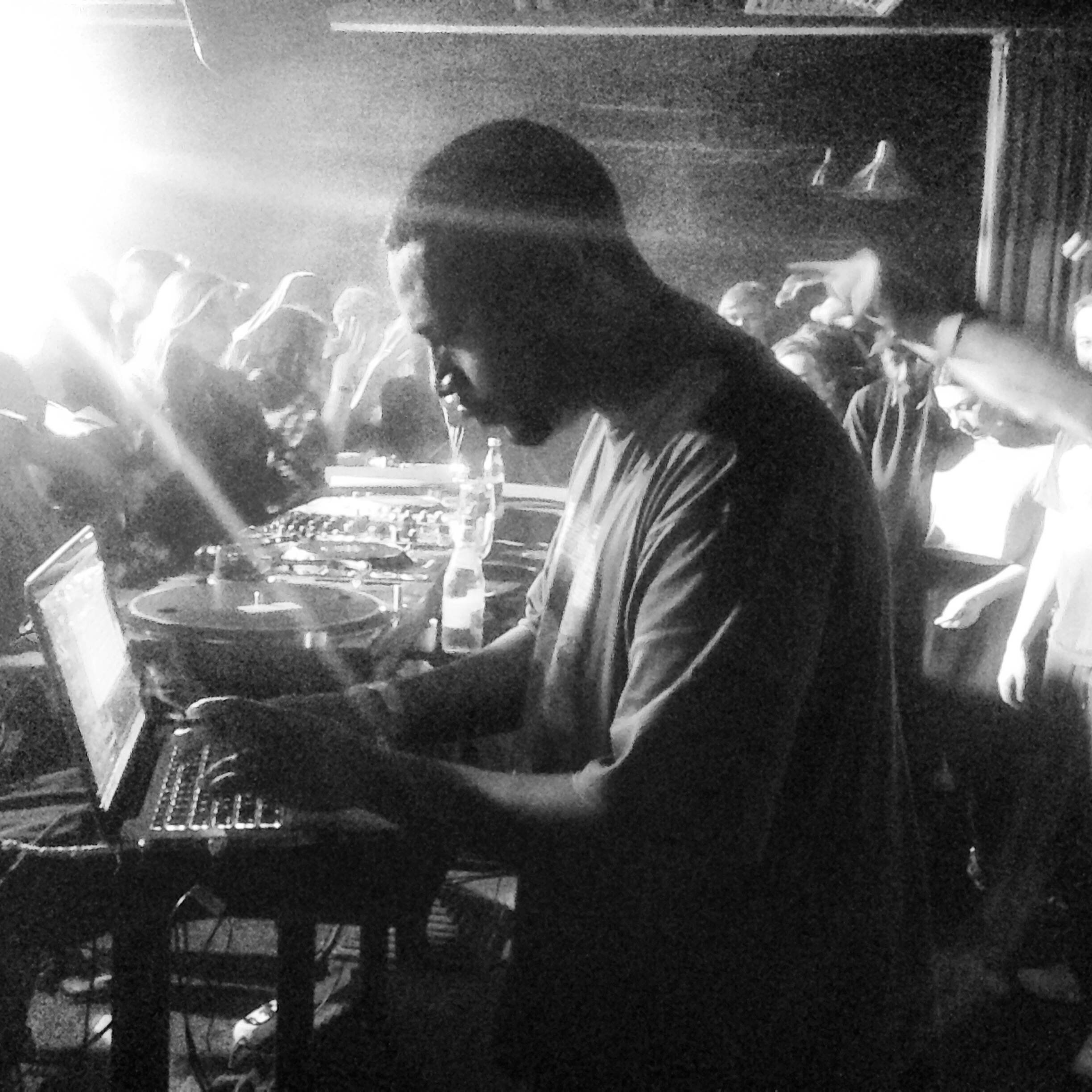
- DJ Rashad performing in Moscow in 2013

Background information
- Birth name: Rashad Hanif Harden
- Born: October 9, 1979; Hammond, Indiana, U.S.
- Died: April 26, 2014 (aged 34); Chicago, Illinois, U.S.
- Genres: Electronic; footwork; juke
- Occupations: Musician; DJ
- Years active: 1998–2014
- Labels: Teklife; Juke Trax; Ghettophiles; Lit City Trax; Planet Mu; Clownhouse Muzik

Rashad Hanif Harden (October 9, 1979 – April 26, 2014), known as DJ Rashad, was a Chicago-based electronic musician, producer and DJ known as a pioneer in the footwork genre and founder of the Teklife crew. He released his debut studio album Double Cup on Hyperdub in 2013 to critical praise. He died in April 2014 from a drug overdose.

== Early life ==
Born in Hammond, Indiana, on October 9, 1979, Harden was the son of Gloria and Anthony Harden. He grew up on 159th Street in the southern part of Calumet City, Illinois, a suburb of Chicago.

He developed an early interest in music and began to DJ in his early teens, influenced by house and juke. In high school, Harden gained further DJ experience at the Kennedy-King College radio station WKKC. He also became a member of local dance troupes, including the HouseOMatics, The Phyrm, and Wolf Pac. In 1992 he made his first public appearance as a DJ at his high school dance party jubilation.

While attending Thornwood High School, Harden met Morris Harper (aka DJ Spinn) during homeroom class. The two began to spend time at each other's houses producing tracks and performing at parties. Harden was one of the founders of the Teklife crew and developed the footwork style around dance battles in the Chicago metropolitan area.

== Career ==
Harden's first recording released to vinyl was the track "Child Abuse" on Dance Mania in 1998. He gained global attention after releasing his single "Itz Not Rite" on Planet Mu and being included on their Bangs and Works album in 2010.

Throughout 2012 and 2013, Rashad performed regularly at 285 KENT in Brooklyn, New York City, drawing further national attention to his own music and to Footwork. In 2013, Harden released the EPs I Don't Give a Fuck and Rollin' on the Hyperdub label. These were followed by the debut full-length album Double Cup (2013), which featured collaborations with DJ Spinn, Taso, DJ Phil, Manny, Earl and Addison Groove. He was one of the performers at the Pitchfork Music Festival in Chicago in 2013 and completed support-slot on the tour of Chance the Rapper in December 2013. His last performance as a DJ was at Club Vinyl in Denver, Colorado on April 24, 2014.

== Death ==
On Saturday, April 26, 2014, Harden was found dead at an apartment on West 21st Street in Chicago. An autopsy confirmed that the death was drug related, with heroin, cocaine, and alprazolam (Xanax) being found in his system. A variety of artists paid tribute thereafter, with Vice writing that "Rashad will undoubtedly be remembered as one of contemporary dance music's most innovative stylists and most irreplaceable presences."

== Musical style ==
Harden's music as DJ Rashad is multifaceted, largely built around samples and drawing from other genres such as trap and jungle. Ruth Saxelby of DUMMY Magazine said that his debut album Double Cup "crystallises the inherent duality of footwork (as represented by the ingredients of the titular syrupy drink: the blunt slowness of codeine and swift sharpness of sugar)." This refers to the low sub-bass and frenetic percussion at a high BPM featured in Harden's music, characteristic of footwork as a whole. His music ranges in emotional tone but often has a sadness to it, drawing from the samples he used as well as the way he manipulated them by stretching, chopping or looping them. Harden's use of samples has been compared to J Dilla, and he is regarded as both a pioneer and an exemplary artist in the footwork genre. He aimed to extend footwork beyond its sole use as dance music, saying in 2013:

"My goal is now, that you don't have to footwork or dance. As long as you get into it and enjoy it, that's cool. You don't have to know certain moves to get down with the music. Just have a good time. That's what I'm trying to have and get across to people. As long as you feel the rhythm and the bass, just vibe with it, you'll be alright. It's for everybody, not just footworkers."

Partially due to this element of his music, Harden was one of the first footwork producers who became popular outside of Chicago.

== Legacy ==
On June 29, 2015, Hyperdub released the 6613 EP, a four-track EP of previously unheard tracks by DJ Rashad. Afterlife was Harden's last album. It featured previously unreleased songs in collaboration with other members of the Teklife crew. It was released on April 8, 2016, as the first release of the new Teklife Records label.

== Discography ==
=== Albums ===
- Da Juke Project (1999)
- Juke Trax Online Vol. 3 (2006)
- Something 2 Dance 2 (2008)
- Just a Taste Vol. One (2011)
- Teklife Volume 1 – Welcome to the Chi (2012)
- Double Cup (2013)
- Afterlife (2016)

=== Singles and EPs ===
- 2004: "Girl Bust Down" (with DJ Spinn; Juke Trax)
- 2004: The White Tees EP (with DJ TY; Juke Trax)
- 2007: "Jukestacy" (Juke Trax Online)
- 2007: "Send It Up" (Juke Trax Online)
- 2007: "Get It Shorty" (Juke Trax Online)
- 2008: "We Break It Down" (with DJ Chi Boogie; Juke Trax Online)
- 2008: "You Know What It Is" (Juke Trax Online)
- 2008: Juke Trax Online Vol. 13 (Juke Trax Online)
- 2008: "Imma Do Me" (Juke Trax Online)
- 2008: "Freakin Me on the Flo" (Juke Trax Online)
- 2008: "Tek-9" (Databass Online)
- 2010: "Grace" (Ghettophiles)
- 2010: "4 the Ghetto" (with DJ Spinn; Ghettophiles)
- 2010: "Itz Not Rite" (Planet Mu)
- 2011: "Meet Tshetsha Boys" (with DJ Spinn and RP Boo; Honest Jon's Records)
- 2013: I Don't Give a Fuck (Hyperdub)
- 2013: "Its Wack" (Grand Theft Auto V)
- 2013: Rollin' (Hyperdub)
- 2014: "We on 1" (Southern Belle Recordings)
- 2014: "Don't This Ish" (with Alix Perez and DJ Spinn, Exit Records/Mixmag)
- 2014: "Make It Worth" (with Alix Perez and DJ Spinn, Exit Records)
- 2015: "6613" (Hyperdub)

== See also ==
- The Era (footwork dance crew)
