= RP Boo =

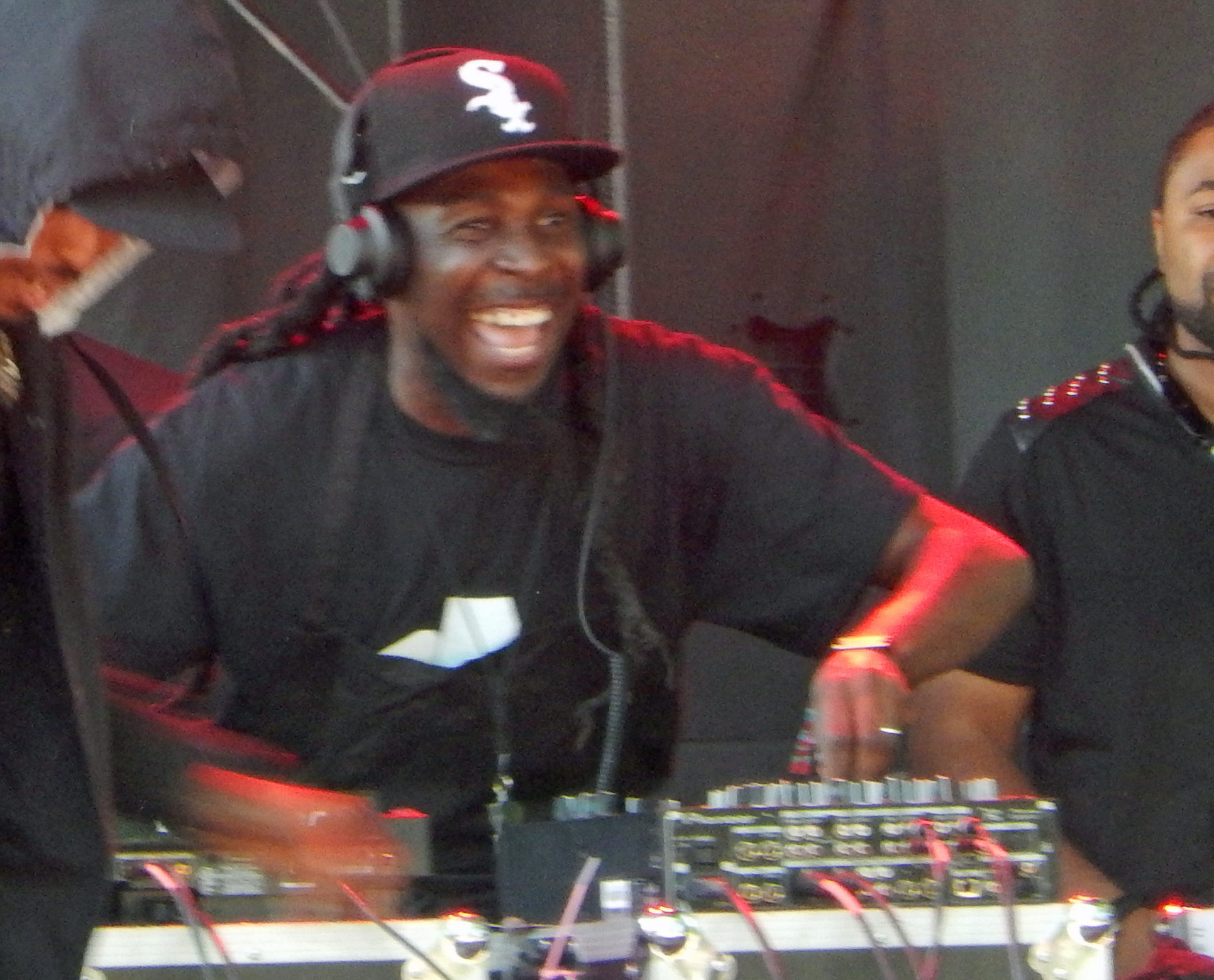
- RP Boo performing in Chicago in 2016

Background information
- Also known as: Arpebu
- Born: Kavain Wayne Space; March 11, 1972 (age 54); Chicago, Illinois, U.S.
- Genres: Footwork, juke
- Occupations: Musician; DJ
- Instruments: Akai MPC, Roland R-70
- Years active: 1997–present
- Label: Planet Mu

Kavain Wayne Space (born March 11, 1972), known as RP Boo or Arpebu, is an American Chicago-based electronic musician, producer and DJ known as one of the originators of the footwork genre during the 1990s. He released his debut album Legacy on Planet Mu in 2013.

Born in West Chicago, RP Boo started as a DJ and dancer working with the House-O-Matics juke and House crew, making mixtapes, and contributing to the Bud Billiken Parade. His early, self-released singles are cited as foundational to the evolution of the style of Footwork. He produces tracks using a Roland R-70 drum machine and an Akai S01 digital sampler.

== Discography ==
=== Albums ===
- Legacy (2013)
- Fingers, Bank Pads, and Shoe Prints (2015)
- I'll Tell You What (2018)
- Established! (2021)
- Legacy Volume 2 (2023)

=== Mixtapes ===
- Dude Off 59th Street (2007)

=== Singles and EPs ===
- "Baby Come On" (1997)
- "11-47-99" (The Godzilla Track) (1999)
- "RP Technic" (2014)
- Classics, Volume 1 (2015)
- "The Ultimate" (2016)
