= Warehouse Records =

- Founded: 1988
- Founder: Mike Dunn; Armando Gallop
- Distributor: High Fashion Music B.V.
- Genre: House music
- Country of origin: United States
- Location: Chicago, Illinois

Warehouse Records is a classic house record label based in Chicago, Illinois, United States.

The company was created by Mike Dunn and Armando Gallop in 1988. Together with Trax Records and DJ International Records, among others, Warehouse Records is the major and most important label records in the history of the Chicago house music.

== Artists ==
- Armando
- The Chicago Bad Boy
- Paul Johnson
- Ron Trent
