= Armando (producer) =

American musician (1970–1996)

Background information
- Born: Armando Gallop; February 12, 1970; Chicago, Illinois, U.S.
- Died: December 17, 1996 (aged 26) U.S.
- Genres: House music
- Occupations: Record producer, musician

Armando Gallop (sometimes written as Armando Gallup) (February 12, 1970 – December 17, 1996), who released material under his first name only, was an American house-music producer and DJ who was an early contributor to the development of acid house.

Armando was born in Chicago to parents of Afro-Cuban descent. He was a star baseball player as a youngster before spinal meningitis put an end to his athletic aspirations. He became interested in dance music, organizing parties by age 16 and mixing on radio by age 17. He and Mike Dunn founded Muzique Records and Warehouse Records in 1988, the latter releasing Armando's singles "151" and "Land of Confusion". "Land of Confusion" became a transatlantic club hit in Chicago as well as in Britain, where it influenced their early acid-house scene. He also produced Warehouse releases from Ron Trent, DJ Rush, and Robert Armani.

Instead of working on production, Armando spent most of the early 1990s with a residency at Chicago's new Warehouse club (in Randolph Street) from 1992 to 1994. He served as an A&R rep for Felix da Housecat's Radikal Fear label and, soon afterward, recorded for that label himself. His first and only full-length album, One World, One Future, was released in 1996 on Play it Again, Sam. Armando died of leukemia shortly after the album's release.
