= Todd Patrick =

Organizer of independently produced concerts (born 1975)

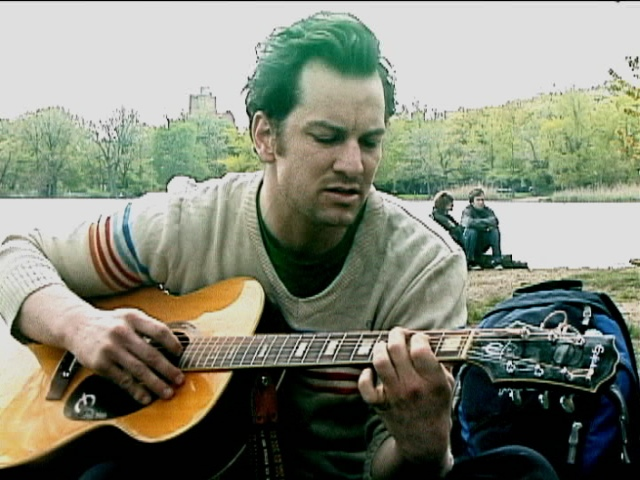
Todd P in 2005

Todd Patrick (aka Todd P) (born 1975) is an organizer of independently produced concerts, based in New York City. Patrick was born in 1975 in Indiana, and grew up in Richardson, Texas.

Patrick is known within the independent music community for selecting and attracting emerging acts to his concerts, as well as for championing all ages access to live music and affordable ticket prices, and for encouraging the use of alternative spaces as venues.

Before relocating to New York City in 2001, Patrick and his then-partner Erin Gordy founded a successful all ages music and arts space in Portland, Oregon known as Seventeen Nautical Miles, as well as booked concerts in Austin, Texas in the mid-1990s.

In 2001 Patrick began organizing events in Brooklyn, New York under the name "Todd P", first at residential lofts, then at clubs and bars, later shunning establishment venues and becoming instrumental in the founding of several New York all ages music venues housed in alternative spaces, including Llano Estacado, Monster Island Basement, Silent Barn, Death By Audio, the Market Hotel, 285 Kent Ave, and others.

Patrick's concerts have provided a forum for independent acts to perform outside of the music industry club circuit, primarily in the Williamsburg, Greenpoint, and Bushwick areas of Brooklyn, New York, and in Downtown Manhattan. Shows Patrick organized provided an early launchpad for many successful independent music acts in the 2000s (decade), including Black Lips, Lightning Bolt, Black Dice, Mount Eerie, Deerhunter, Dan Deacon, Matt and Kim, Real Estate, Pictureplane, Woods, USAISAMONSTER, Dirty Projectors, Surfer Blood, TV on the Radio, Gang Gang Dance, DIIV, Teengirl Fantasy, Kitty, No Age, Vivian Girls, and others.

Patrick also gained notoriety organizing an annual festival of free and all ages concerts in Austin, Texas during the South by Southwest music festival in the years 2006, 2007, 2008, 2009, and 2010. The festival was chronicled in the 2009 film Todd P Goes to Austin.

In 2007, Patrick founded the New York City free newspaper SHOWPAPER, which provides comprehensive listings of music events that do not discriminate by age, and features full color prints of contemporary visual art. Patrick serves as the executive director of the not for profit publication, and oversees the curation of the art on the publication's cover.

Patrick is a curator and organizer of an annual music festival in Monterrey, Mexico known as Festival Nrmal + MtyMx, which launched in 2010.

In 2012, Patrick founded a contemporary art gallery in Tijuana, Mexico called Otras Obras.

Patrick has received press coverage in The New York Times, New York Magazine, SPIN, Pitchfork Media, Vice Magazine, The Village Voice, Time Out New York, The New York Press, among other outlets.
