= The Era (dance crew) =

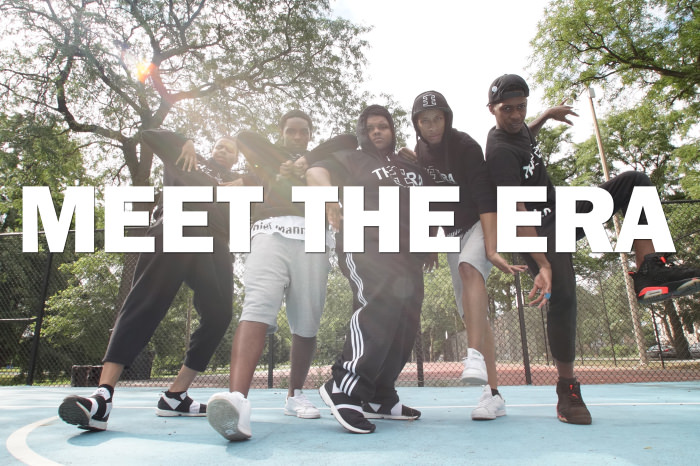
Meet the Era

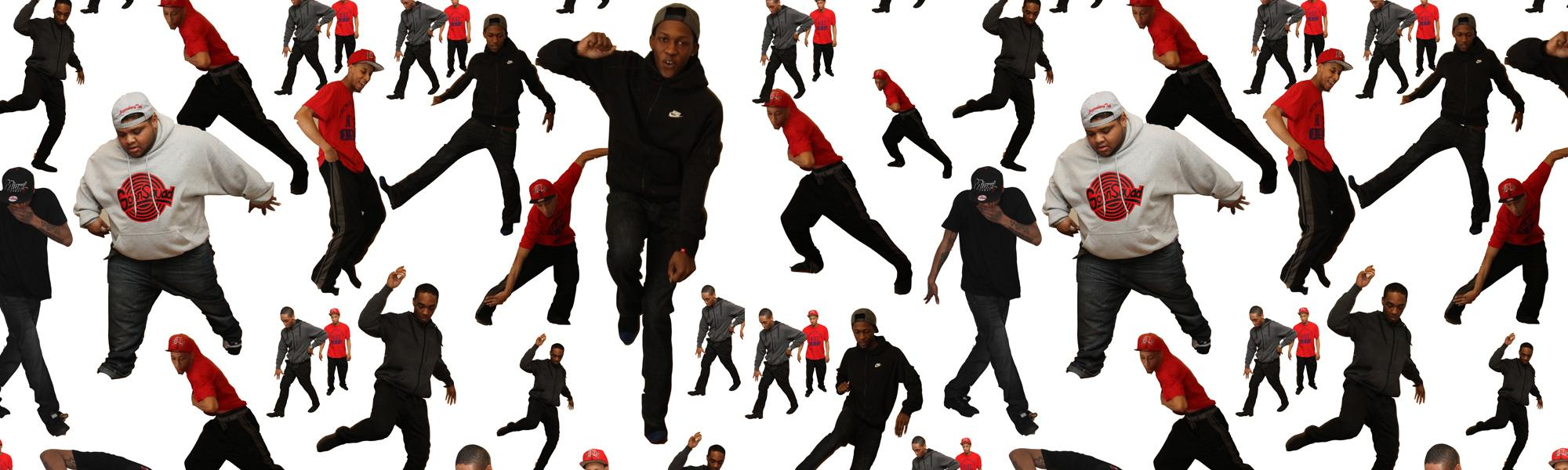
The Era

The Era is a Chicago-based footwork dance crew. Dancers from the group have performed at London's Barbican, the Pitchfork Festival in Chicago, and South by Southwest. The group also teaches footwork at High Concept Laboratories, where they have an incubation studio space.

The group was founded on the South Side of Chicago. Members Litebulb, Steelo, Dempsey, and Chief Manny (along with DJ Jody Breeze a.k.a. JodyDigital) met as members of the Chicago battle crew Terra Squad. Litebulb and P-Top met on the set of the film Manglehorn.

In 2015, Litebulb received the Chicago Dancemakers Forum Award. In 2015, members Litebulb and Glasspiegel received the Crossing Boundaries award from the University of Chicago. They expressed plans to use the prize to develop an educational project on the history of footwork. In 2016, the group performed their debut stage performance, In the Wurkz, featuring new choreography, music videos and performance by The Era.
