= Footwork (genre) =

Genre of electronic music

- Other names: Juke; Chicago juke; Project house
- Stylistic origins: Ghetto house
- Cultural origins: Late 1990s – early 2000s, Chicago, United States
- Typical instruments: Sampler, drum machine (Roland TR-808), synthesizer, sequencer

Subgenres
- Vocaloid juke

Fusion genres
- Footwork jungle; Party-juke

Regional scenes
- Europe; Japan; Latin America; Russia; New Zealand

Footwork, also called juke, or Chicago juke, is a genre of electronic dance music derived from ghetto house with elements of hip-hop, first appearing in Chicago in the late 1990s. The music style evolved from the earlier, rapid rhythms of ghetto house, a change pioneered by RP Boo, DJ Rashad and DJ Clent. It may draw from the rapid rhythms and sub-bass frequencies of drum & bass. Tracks also frequently feature heavily syncopated samples from rap, pop and other sources, and are often around 160 bpm. The term juke music may be used as a synonym for footwork music, or may be used to differentiate between footwork and the closely related proper juke music born in the 1990s from ghetto house together with footwork music, and somewhat predating it.

Footwork is also a style of house dance, closely associated with juke and footwork music, and typified by very fast and chaotic feet moves.

== Etymology ==
The name "footwork" given to the genre refers to the footwork dance that accompanies it and is characterized by very fast structured dance footwork. The arguably first mention of the term "footwork" within the ghetto house scene of Chicago was WaxMaster's "Foot work" track in 1995. Footwerk and footwurk are two other forms of the term sometimes used to describe this genre.

The name juke is of unclear origin. It is believed to have originated from West African languages and came to Chicago use via Gullah. The term "juke" is believed to come from the Gullah word joog or jug, meaning rowdy or disorderly which itself is derived from the Wolof word dzug meaning to misconduct one's self.

The term juke, as being applied to particular styles of ghetto house, came into use from DJ Puncho and Gant-Man in the late 1990s by releasing tracks such as "Juke it" in 1997. Some originators of the footwork, notable example being DJ Clent preferred to call footwork music project house and were consciously avoiding the term juke, which was associated with DJ Puncho and Gant-Man. However, the term "juke" came to dominate the whole ghetto house scene, including footwork, often being used as a blanket term to denote any style derived from ghetto house and even its progenitor, ghetto house, was at times called "juke" too. In this regard, any style of music derived from ghetto house in the 1990s would be called "juke" music, or be described as belonging to "Chicago juke scene".

The terms footwork and juke, as referring to the fast syncopated genre of electronic dance music derived from ghetto house, may be used interchangeably. Apart from simply being synonyms, there is also a strong tradition to distinguish these two terms, where juke is constrained to the earlier years of the genre, with footwork in this sense being a more chaotic, complex and abstract offshoot of proper juke music, that brought wider attention in the late 2000s. Sometimes, the combined terms juke and footwork (or footwork and juke) are used to describe the single musical scene or musical movement, born from Chicago ghetto house. In this regard, as one review summarized, the situation with terms is analogous to jungle (music genre) vs. drum'n'bass dispute, where some people consider the terms to be mere synonyms, while others prefer to call jungle a proper progenitor of drum'n'bass.

== History ==
Footwork music first appeared in the late 1990s to early 2000s as a faster and increasingly abstract variant of ghetto house. The genre evolved to match the energy of footwork dance, a dance style born in the disparate ghettos, house parties and underground dance competitions of Chicago. RP Boo, a former footwork dancer, is generally credited with making the first songs that fall within the canon by releasing songs such as "Baby Come On" in 1997 which is oftentimes considered the founding track of footwork. According to RP Boo, the first sign of the genre's emergence happened, when ghetto house first started to be played at a faster speed when a group of ghetto house DJs from the Chicago West Side started playing ghetto house records at 45 RPM instead of standard 33 RPM. Among other people involved in the creation of the footwork sound were DJ Rashad (with his 1998 track called "Child Abuse" (with DJ Thadz)) and DJ Clent (with his 1996 track "Hail Mary" (with DJ Slugo) and 1998 track "3rd Wurle"). During that time, in 1998, DJ Clent formed a crew of him and the likely minded producers, namely, DJ Spinn, DJ Rashad, RP Boo, DJ C-Bit, Majik Myke and others, called "Beatdown House" of from whom footwork originated. As DJ Clent put it, around that time footwork pioneers tried to consciously distance themselves from the "juke" label, which was being used to denote fast four-to-the-floor ghetto house music and was more closely associated with DJ Gant-Man and M Puncho, rather than with Beatdown House, who pioneered more abstract, sparse and menacing proper footwork music; however, despite their effort, the word "juke" started to be used as a label for footwork music as well.

Other early proponents of the genre included DJ Diamond (Karlis Griffin), DJ Roc and DJ Nate.

During the 2000s, footwork relied heavily in its distribution on a peer-to-peer mixtape exchange in Chicago public schools, which is why the earliest works in the genre are often hard to obtain. Other channels producers used around that time for distribution of their tracks included free-to-use media sharing platforms of the day, for instance now-closed imeem.com, MySpace and YouTube. Some of the earliest tracks of footwork only gained exposure after European labels started re-releasing them throughout the 2010s.

Around 2007 footwork gained some brief exposure on MTV and the Internet, with the release of such tracks as Kanye West's remix "Pro Nails" by Chicagoan rapper Kid Sister (2007), which showcased half-time/full-time tempo switch, typical for the genre, albeit at a slower tempo. At the same time the footwork dancing was showcased in Twista's juke track Pimp Like Me from his 2007 album Adrenaline Rush 2007 produced by Cuzzo and Tight Mike, and which also gained airplay on MTV Video. Music video for Pimp Like Me also featured scenes of footwork dancing.

Radio station Afropop Worldwide remarked on the genre and its developments in 2011, saying that:

The most recent development in house's evolution, however, is a sound called 'footwork'. On Friday evenings at the Underground Tracks Factory, teenagers face off and improvise footwork dance battles. Their feet fly at insane speeds, something of a cross between house dance, tap dancing and breakdancing footwork. It looks like a dance from another dimension. The music they dance to is related to juke, but it's way more spacious, with more rhythmic complexity. Some tracks like "Reverb" by DJ Rashad are downright experimental walls of pulsating noise that would make John Cage proud. All these styles speak to the truth that house music never really left Chicago, as is often said. Its legacy continues to reverberate and mutate throughout the city.

In 2014, one of the most well-recognized figures in footwork and the leader of Teklife, DJ Rashad, died of drug overdose, shortly after releasing a critically acclaimed footwork and juke album Double Cup on Hyperdub. This has put a strain on genre's development, particularly in Chicago, where at the same time youth started to prefer to listen to drill music instead. However, as DJ Taye of Teklife and RP Boo noted, footwork, at the time it was declining in Chicago, found new exposure elsewhere in the world, particularly in Europe. After 2013, RP Boo toured worldwide so consistently that he could afford to quit his full-time job at a home repair store in Chicago, something he could not afford doing during footwork's formative years.

== Characteristics ==
Footwork songs are generally around 150–165 BPM with beat-skipping kick drums, pounding rapidly (and at times very sparsely) in syncopation with crackling snares, claps, and other sounds reminiscent of old drum machines. The overall feel of the rhythm in more experimental tracks in the genre may sound intentionally undanceable for a casual listener. Vocal chops from unrelated genres, such as contemporary R&B and pop music are common and may also be up- or down-pitched. The production style is often markedly lo-fi, much like baile funk.

The tempo of footwork tracks may switch back and forth, alternating hi-speed full-time and half-time sections. The overall mood of the genre is said to be hypnotic, dark and abstract. The genre makes marked heavy use of sub-bass and its fast and repetitive rhythmic atmosphere is said to be reminiscent of the early jungle music.

Along with "juke" being used as a synonym for footwork music, a strong tradition in the juke and footwork scene is to differentiate proper juke music from proper footwork music, the former being fast (around 150-160 BPM) four-to-the-floor ghetto house music, somewhat predating footwork (proper juke music being said to originate around the early or mid-to-late 1990s), while proper footwork music (originating in the late 1990s) being a more rhythmically abstract musical form than proper juke with beat skips, alternating full-time to half-time tempo, and thus departing from house music entirely. Both variants (juke music and footwork music) use the same BPM of 150 to 160 and heavily rely on cutout sampling techniques.

== International growth ==
=== Europe ===
Footwork in Europe
- Stylistic origins: Footwork; Dubstep; Oldschool jungle
- Cultural origins: Late 2000s, United Kingdom
- Typical instruments: Sampler, drum machine (Roland TR-808), synthesizer, sequencer

Fusion genres
- Footwork jungle

In Europe, juke has been popular in European clubs, particularly in Paris, Brussels, and Spain for years. UK label Planet Mu's compilations Bangs and Works Volume 1 (2010) and Bangs and Works Volume 2 (2011) have brought the work of Chicago DJs to a wider audience, drawing some media attention and becoming the first internationally recognized juke compilations. The liner notes for Vol. 1 noted:

Footwork is a hyper rhythmic, abstract dance music, pitched around 160bpm, that largely consists of a template of cut-up samples and phrases that are twisted into repetitive rhythms & shapes, to offbeat, syncopated drum machine patterns and pumping sub-bass lines.

Apart from Bangs and Works, Planet Mu has also been releasing original albums by Chicago footwork artists, for example Da Trax Anthology by DJ Nate (2010), which are oftentimes sourced from shelved tracks from the 2000s Myspace and imeem.com era.

The Hyperdub label has been a supporter of juke music, releasing much of DJ Rashad's material. Deeon has released two projects on the famous French Ghetto music label Booty Call Records in 2013

The early attempt to emulate juke sound in Europe was the infamous "Footcrab" by Addison Groove, coming out in 2010 on Loefah's SWAMP 81 label. "Footcrab" took inspiration from footwork, however the sound of "Footcrab" was slowed down to match the tempo of UK bass genres, around 140 BPM. "Footcrab" drew some criticism to be parting ways from the raw nature of juke roots in Chicago and only emulating the sound of juke on a "child-like" surface level and the production on "Footcrab" was deemed "cheap". Notwithstanding the criticism, "Footcrab" put Addison Groove on forefront of the UK Bass scene in the United Kingdom. His subsequent full-length album called Transistor Rhythm released on Modeselector's 50 Weapons label, while retaining the influence of footwork, shifted more to the earlier days of the genre and to the sound of its immediate predecessor, ghetto house, including ravey synths at much slower tempos that footwork, around 120–140 BPM. However, the album was also met with mixed to negative reviews.

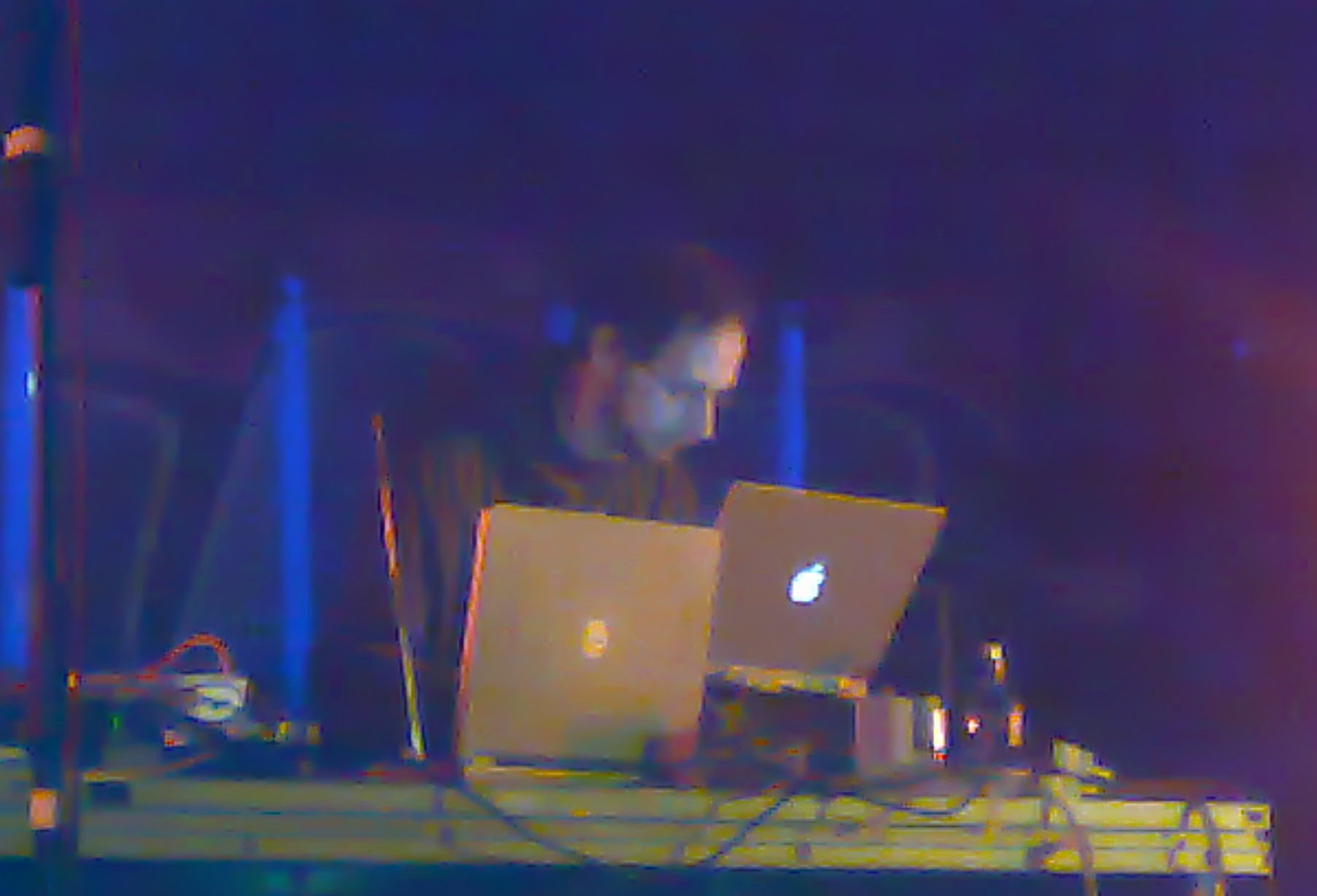
Mike Paradinas, who helped popularize footwork/juke in Europe and beyond, by releasing Bangs and Works series of compilations

Apart from isolated releases like those by Addison Groove and handful of others, footwork/juke did not meet wide native acceptance in the United Kingdom. Mike Paradinas, the head of Planet Mu label explained this by making two points: first, in his words, was that British party culture is markedly different – relying on illegal substances and drinking – it would have hard time to catch on rather athletic footwork dancing, and second, in his words, is that historically British artists were generally reluctant to appropriate whole cultures, instead trying to either make their own domestic trends or to add a distinct spin to an existing culture, the thing that did not happen to footwork in Britain.

Since Paradinas’ isolated comments, a thriving Chicago Footwork scene has developed across the UK — particularly in London. Today, footworkers can attend classes led by Tiger Heslop, a dance teacher and member of Creation Global, an international collective of dancers and producers focused on Chicago Footwork. After Werks is a London-based monthly social event for Chicago Footwork dancers, DJs, producers, and enthusiasts. The London-based footwork party promoter Tropical Waste has regularly teamed up with After Werks to bring DJs such as RP Boo, DJ Earl, and Heavee — among many others — to the UK, where they are joined by UK footwork dancers.

In addition to curating events, Tropical Waste also hosts a monthly radio show called 160 Unity on Voices Radio. Chris Kanski, a 160 Unity regular and After Werks attendee, spoke to The Guardian newspaper in 2025 about the London scene, saying: “Footwork nights give that spontaneous expression and that challenge that’s so special in hardcore punk. There are eyes on you, and people are looking both at what you express and what you can do”.

=== Japan ===
Japanese juke and footwork
- Stylistic origins: Footwork; Otaku culture; Vocaloid music; Wonky music; Funk; Acid house; Boogie music; Reggae; Dancehall; Rock music; Ghettotech; Rapping
- Cultural origins: Late 2000s, Japan
- Typical instruments: Sampler, drum machine (Roland TR-808), synthesizer, sequencer

Subgenres
- Vocaloid juke

Fusion genres
- Party-juke

==== Beginnings ====
In contrast with Britain, Japan, according to Mike Paradinas, did not hesitate to appropriate western subcultures in their entirety, and that was the reason why in Japan footwork/juke sprung to become, over the 2010s, one of the dominant electronic dance music genres, paired with the burgeoning footwork dancing scene, with competitions and tournaments.

DJ Fulltono from Osaka is credited as a first notable pioneer of footwork/juke in Japan. He started bringing footwork/juke into his mixes around 2008, two years prior to the release of the first compilation from Bangs and Works series on Planet Mu, and at the time, the dominant types of electronic dance music in Japan were house and techno timing at around 120 to 130 BPM, and drum'n'bass, at around 170–175 BPM, so at first dancing crowds in Japan were confused and deemed footwork as "too fast" for their palate. However, with time they have built tolerance to the DJ sounds of DJ Fulltono. It took Japanese producers and listeners almost a decade to adapt to juke, but around 2018 the footwork scene of Japan was noted to be among the most vibrant electronic dance music scenes in the country, incorporating disparate additional influences into sound, such as vocaloids, otaku culture, Japanese rock, reggae, funk, chiptune music and wonky music, thus innovating in the genre.

Another notable influence on the formation of Japanese footwork/juke scene was Japanese ghettotech scene, movement led by DJ April and DJ Go, among others. DJ Fulltono, apart from being footwork pioneer in Japan, was (and continues to be) an important DJ in Japanese ghettotech scene as well, around the time he started popularizing footwork in Japan.

The first Japanese juke label, called Booty Tune was set up by DJ Fulltono in 2008, initially to release his own tracks, but gradually became an imprint under which other domestic juke artists started to release their tracks. After that, more Japanese footwork labels appeared, namely Japanese Mutation Bootyism (which released important Japanese Juke and Footworks Compilation), Kool Switch Works and Dubliminal Bounce (by Japanese footwork producer Skip Club Orchestra).

The scene in Japan received support from Chicago scene on several occasions. Many founding fathers of juke toured Japan, many of the events were as well organized by DJ Fulltono. Most Japanese footwork producers who were interviewed by Bandcamp named footwork producer Traxman from Chicago and Bangs and Works as their primary sources of inspiration. In return, Traxman released a full album of remixes of his tracks, where remixes were made exclusively by Japanese producers.

In 2018, THUMP released a video documentary on Japanese juke and footwork scene.

==== Footwork dance in Japan ====
The genre also sparked interest in footwork dancing and that gave birth to Battle Train Tokyo footwork dancing competition held in Tokyo. It has even been suggested that around that time the number of footwork dancers in Japan was increasing faster than the number of actual Japanese footwork producers.

==== Subgenres and artists ====
Plenty of experimentation happened in the Japanese juke scene over the years. For instance, some of the releases in Omoide label catalogue kickstarted the so-called vocaloid juke by combining footwork music with vocaloids. Other producers incorporated influence from wonky music.

Another homegrown subgenre of juke in Japan is party-juke, which is a fusion of hip-hop rapping over footwork backing tracks. Originally, in Chicago, producers mostly eschewed rappers, using vocal sample chops instead, but in Japan party-juke became its own subculture with wider footwork/juke subculture. The subgenre of party-juke had its first moment with the release of 160or80 compilation in 2013, according to Japanese ghettotech and footwork veteran producer DJ April.

The influence of Japanese rock on Japanese juke and vice versa was so pronounced, that well-known rock music nights in Tokyo called SHINJUKO ROCKS started hosting juke parties.

Notable Japanese footwork artists include DJ Fulltono, Gnyonpix, who introduced gameboy music influence into juke, Paisley Parks production trio, DJ Dike (along with his Oneday Recs. label), bringing influence of reggae and dancehall horn sections into footwork, Oyubi, CRZKNY, Boogie Mann, bringing influence of funk, boogie and acid house into footwork, KΣITO, PERCEPTION, Haya6Go, DJ Aflow, Uncle Texx, Picnic Women, Foodman, and others.

Among other notable labels that release footwork/juke in Japan, stand Shinkaron label and Ghost label (run by Paisley Parks).

==== Social impact ====
Japanese juke scene was also politically outspoken on the topic of nuclear energy in Japan, particularly after the 2011 Tohoku tsunami disaster, taking opposing stance. The annual Atomic Bomb Compilation of juke music, released by Hiroshima footwork producer CRZKNY (with the idea originating from another footwork producer from Japan, Gnyonpix) protests both nuclear warfare proliferation and nuclear energy proliferation. At first, the compilation only included Japanese producers, alluding mainly to the Fukushima disaster and bombing of Hiroshima and Nagasaki, but as time went on, it started including juke producers from around the world, from Mexico, Poland and from the United States.

Japanese juke scene is also noted to serve as a refuge from the relatively strict corporate culture in Japan, with many producers coming from middle-class working white-collar jobs by day and thus it would be nearly to impossible for them to communicate with each other, having different positions in social hierarchy, if not for footwork, which has a liberalizing effect on those who participate in the scene.

=== Latin America ===
Around the second half of the 2010s, juke brought attention in Latin America and Brazil. In 2017, Mexico-based JukeMX footwork producer collective, consisting of producers Eric Uh, Sonido Berzerk, Ma Fuego, Spacetrilla and others, released the Traxmex compilation series, showcasing local improvements of the original genre, introducing Latin percussion and samples from baile funk into footwork. Another noted Latin footwork producer collective is Ten Toes Turbo.

In Brazil, producer Cesrv, founder of local Beatwise Recordings label, included juke tracks into South release.

In the southern part of South America, Argentinian footwork label ABBYSS brought attention by releasing Foodworks series of compilations, consisting of local footwork tracks, since 2015. In Chile around that time, the MakinMovs netlabel was releasing juke compilations, which also included tracks by footwork producers from Mexico, Argentina and Peru.

In Peru, a local Matraca netlabel released Lima Footwork compilation in 2017, consisting of tracks of Matraca resident producers, such as Dr.100, Rashid from Lima, Lukrø, and others. Later, in 2019, Lukrø collaborated with New York City-based juke producer Regent Street, to produce a glitch and reggaeton inspired track called Fire.

== Dance ==
Footwork dance somewhat predates footwork and juke music and started as a dance to house music, with elements of breakdancing, on the west side of Chicago in the mid/late 1980s, eventually spreading to the south side and inspiring its own eponymous genre of music.

The dance involves complex fast movement of the feet with accompanying twists and turns, and usually takes place as part of a "battle". The upper side of the body, in contrast, stays mostly unmoved. Most movements in the footwork dance happen below the knees. The style was popularized outside Chicago by inclusion in the music video for Dude 'n Nem's 2007 single "Watch My Feet".

Chicago Footwork dancing also typically takes place in the battle scene. Dance crews usually gather in a circular formation to face off against each other. Some common dance moves that one may see performed in the circle are the "Erk n Jerk" and the "Holy Ghost." Throughout Footwork's early years, the battles were predominantly for males. One rarely saw a female having an opportunity in the spotlight as a footwork. However, in recent years, there has been a push and movement for more female presence within footwork circles.

== See also ==
- RP Boo
- DJ Rashad
- Ghetto house
- Chicago stepping
- The Era (dance crew)
