= Dance Mania (record label) =

Mania 90
- Founded: 1985
- Founder: Jesse Saunders; Ray Barney
- Genre: House; ghetto house
- Country of origin: United States
- Location: Chicago, Illinois

Dance Mania is a Chicago independent record label originally founded by Jesse Saunders for a one-off release of "What's That" by The Browns in 1985. The label name was picked by Ray Barney one year later, with permission from Duane Buford who wrote the record.

The label released almost three hundred records until it closed in 1999. The label relaunched in 2013, following a recent DJ demand for their 90s records.

The label is regarded as hugely influential in the history of Chicago house music, and has been described as "ghetto house's Motown".
