= Ghetto house =

Sub-genre of house music

- Stylistic origins: Chicago house
- Cultural origins: Late 1980s, Chicago, Illinois, United States
- Derivative forms: Ghettotech; juke and footwork; Baltimore club

Ghetto house or booty house is a subgenre of house music which started being recognized as a distinct style from around 1992 onwards. It features minimal 808 and 909 drum machine-driven tracks and sometimes sexually explicit lyrics.

The template of classic Chicago house music (primarily, "It's Time for the Percolator" by Cajmere) was used with the addition of sexual lyrics. It has usually been made on minimal equipment with little or no effects. It usually features either a "4-to-the-floor" kick drum or beat-skipping kick drums such as those found in the subgenre "juke" (full sounding, but not too long or distorted) along with Roland 808 and 909 synthesized tom-tom sounds, minimal use of analogue synths, and short, slightly dirty sounding (both sonically and lyrically) vocals samples, often repeated in various ways. Also common are 808 and 909 clap sounds, and full "rapped" verses and choruses.

Ghetto house music artists include: DJ Deeon, Jammin' Gerald, DJ Funk, DJ Milton, DJ Slugo, Waxmaster, Traxman, and Parris Mitchell.

== Subgenres ==
=== Juke music ===
The late 1990s saw a rise in juke music (also known as juke house or Chicago juke), as a faster variant of ghetto house. Juke songs are generally around 150–165 BPM with kick drums, pounding rapidly (and at times very sparsely) in syncopation with crackling snares, claps, high hats, samples in very short increments and other sounds reminiscent of old drum machines. The production style is often markedly lo-fi, much like baile funk. Juke evolved to match the energy of footwork, a dance style born in the disparate ghettos, house parties and underground dance competitions of Chicago. RP Boo, a former footwork dancer, is generally credited with making the first songs that fall within the canon.

== See also ==
- DJ Funk
- Dance Mania
