= Me in 20 Years =

Single by Moses Sumney

from the album Græ
- Released: January 6, 2020
- Genre: Soul; art rock
- Length: 3:40
- Label: Jagjaguwar
- Songwriters: Moses Sumney; Matthew Otto
- Producers: Matthew Otto; Moses Sumney; Daniel Lopatin (add.)

Moses Sumney singles chronology
"Polly" (2019)	"Me in 20 Years" (2020)	"Cut Me" (2020)

Music video
- "Me in 20 Years" on YouTube

"Me in 20 Years" is a song recorded by Ghanaian-American singer-songwriter Moses Sumney. It was released on January 6, 2020, as the third single from his second studio album, Græ through Jagjaguwar.

The song was written and produced by Sumney with Canadian musician Matthew Otto with additional production from American experimental electronic music producer Oneohtrix Point Never under his real name, Daniel Lopatin.

== Production ==
In an interview with Zane Lowe, Sumney revealed about the production of the track:

"Upon playing the demo for 'Me in 20 Years' for Dan Lopatin (Oneohtrix Point Never), he told me it sounded like an old lady screaming to herself in the middle of Whole Foods. I knew then and there that he was the right collaborator to take [the song] to a catastrophic level."

== Composition ==
The song was described by Tom Breihan of Stereogum as "dizzy piece music that walks the line between astral soul and art-rock".

Lyrically, the song tackles how Sumney wonders and asks questions about his life in twenty years, highlighting the absence of romantic lover and being alone. Martin Colino of Blanc Magazine stated the song "evokes the surreal mind space of a heartbroken lover imagining their future with, or without, their partner, unable to decide which fate would be worse". Lake Schatz of Consequence noted the fragility and uncertainty in the lyrics.

== Critical reception ==
Krystal Rodriguez of Fact described the song as "minimal" and further stated that it is "delicate in nature with the emotional force of a gut punch". While reviewing the associated album, Jenessa Williams of DIY praised Sumney's vocal performances, calling them "plucking glorious, impossible high notes out of the ether". Elisa Bray of The Independent described the song as a "heart-wrenching apex". The Observer's Kitty Empire called "Me in 20 Years" as the "sucker punch" of the second part of græ, further praised Sumney's vocal performances. Jayson Greene of Pitchfork named the track as the highlight of græ alongside "Lucky Me", stated that the two tracks "come from a place where Sumney often finds himself: his glittering voice, resplendent and alone, aching in solitude".

== Music video ==
The accompanying music video for "Me in 20 Years" was released on July 22, 2020. It was directed by Allie Avital and shot in Kyiv, Ukraine. The video looks into Sumney's future as a bearded old man who lives alone. The idea for the music video was conceived after Avital offered to direct as soon as she listened to the track. "Once I saw the story in my head, it made me want to cry whenever I imagined it, and so I knew we needed to make it. Luckily he was into it, so we developed it together from there," she added.

The track was released with an accompanying lyric video on January 6, 2020. Krystal Rodriguez of Fact called the lyric video "equally heartstring-tugging".

== In other media ==
"Me in 20 Years" was featured in the special episode, "Trouble Don't Last Always" of American teen drama television series, Euphoria. Lydia Wang of Refinery29 noted that the track encapsulated the fear of the character, Rue Bennett, in wondering how her future would be like and whether she was destined to be alone.

== Personnel ==
- Moses Sumney – vocals, songwriting, production, engineering
- Matthew Otto – songwriting, production, engineering, synths
- Daniel Lopatin – additional production, synths
- Jake Viator – engineering
- Ricardo Wheelock – engineering
- Joe LaPorta – mastering

Credits adapted from the liner notes of Græ.
