= Virile (song) =

Single by Moses Sumney

from the album Græ
- Released: November 14, 2019
- Studio: Echo Mountain Recording (Asheville, North Carolina)
- Genre: Art pop; indie rock; grunge; pop
- Length: 4:16
- Label: Jagjaguwar
- Songwriter(s): Moses Sumney; Yvette
- Producer(s): Moses Sumney; Andrew Chugg (add.); Ben Baptie (add.); Daniel Lopatin (add.)

Moses Sumney singles chronology
"Rank & File" (2018)	"Virile" (2019)	"Polly" (2019)

Music video
- "Virile" on YouTube

"Virile" is a song recorded by American singer-songwriter Moses Sumney. It was released on November 14, 2019, as the lead single from his second studio album Græ through Jagjaguwar.

The song was written by Sumney alongside industrial rock duo, Yvette, consisting of Noah Kardos-Fein and Dale Eisinger. It was produced by Sumney, with additional production by Andrew Chugg, Ben Baptie, and electronic musician Oneohtrix Point Never under his real name, Daniel Lopatin.

== Composition ==
The track explores about the concept of masculinity. As described by Elizabeth Aubrey of NME, lyrically, through this song Sumney "thrashes against the status quo" as stated with lines: "You've got the wrong guy / You wanna slip right in / Amp up the masculine / You've got the wrong idea, son." Similar idea is echoed by A.D. Amorosi of Variety. He commented that "Sumney taking the piss out of everyday machismo and the rarity of gallantry." Jayson Greene of Pitchfork interpreted the lyrics as "a withering send-up of the pointlessness of toxic masculinity in a world where the body inevitably turns to dust and matter."

The track is instrumentally complete with strings, guitar, percussion, drums, harps, cello, flute, piano and bass. Musically, Aubrey commented that the song's "gentle harps and soft flutes are overwhelmed by thunderous beats and clashing synths." Max Freedman of The A.V. Club called the musical direction of the track as "arena-ready grunge". Kitty Empire of The Observer described the sound of the track as "allied with waves of lavish instrumentation and pugnacious rhythms."

== Critical reception ==
The track was met with favorable reviews. Timmhotep Aku of Afropunk praised Sumney's "signature falsetto" and called it "gives way to guitar power chords". Ben Kaye of Consequence of Sound praised the track and described it was "hard to pin down" and as "a clash of TV on the Radio indie and thudding The Smashing Pumpkins alternative with the drama of an art-rock opera." While reviewing the associated album, A.D. Amorosi of Variety called the track as the album's "musical moratorium". Comparing the track's tone to his debut studio album Aromanticism, Marcus J. Moore of Entertainment Weekly called the track "verges closer to a positive declaration, as Sumney pushes through darkness toward a semblance of light." Elisa Bray of The Independent praised the track and described it as "a satisfying contrast of textures incorporates a growling drone, soft flute and his angelic vocals."

== Music video ==
The accompanying music video of "Virile" was released the same day as the track. It was directed by Sumney himself as his directorial debut. About the video, Sumney commented the video took place "in a post-human world, the last remaining man is caught between beauty and brutality's battle to dominate the earth and his body." The video features Sumney performing an interpretive dance number, as he convulses across the fog-swirled floor of a meat locker while carcasses swing behind him on hooks. Digital video channel, Nowness described the video that "Sumney tiptoes between the topics of brutality and beauty, masculinity and femininity, as well as, constrain and freedom."

== Personnel ==
- Moses Sumney – vocals, songwriting, production, engineering
- YVETTE – songwriting
  - Noah Kardos-Fein – guitar
- Andrew Chugg – additional production, engineering
- Ben Baptie – additional production, engineering, drum programming, mixing
- Daniel Lopatin – additional production
- Alexis Berthelot – engineering
- Joe LaPorta – mastering
- Rashaan Carter – harp engineering
- Thundercat – bass
- Ian Chang – drums
- Brandee Younger – harp
- Nubya Garcia – flute
- Rob Moose – string, string arrangement
- Keith Tutt II – cello

Credits adapted from the liner notes of Græ.
