= Aromanticism (album) =

Studio album by Moses Sumney
- Released: September 22, 2017
- Genres: Chamber folk; electro-soul
- Length: 34:46
- Label: Jagjaguwar
- Producers: Moses Sumney; Joshua Willing Halpern; Cam O'bi; Gueorgui Linev; Matt Otto; Ludwig Göransson

Moses Sumney chronology
Lamentations (2016)	Aromanticism (2017)	Græ (2020)

Singles from Aromanticism
- 1. "Doomed" Released: June 27, 2017; 2. "Quarrel" Released: August 11, 2017; 3. "Indulge Me" Released: September 5, 2017

Aromanticism is the debut studio album by American singer-songwriter Moses Sumney. It was released on September 22, 2017, by Jagjaguwar. It is a concept album about "lovelessness as a sonic dreamscape" that "seeks to interrogate the idea that romance is normative and necessary." The record was written and produced by Sumney, with assistance from numerous musicians. It features new versions of two previously released songs, "Plastic" and "Lonely World".

== Composition ==
The songs on Aromanticism have been seen as chamber songs with "nocturnal-sounding" arrangements. It is also a "heady mélange" that mixes folk and soul music with jazz harmonies.

== Critical reception ==
Professional ratings
Aggregate scores
Source	Rating
AnyDecentMusic?	7.9/10
Metacritic	85/100
Review scores
Source	Rating
AllMusic	4.5/5 stars
Chicago Tribune	3.5/4 stars
Clash	8/10
Consequence of Sound	A−
Exclaim!	8/10
The Guardian	4/5 stars
The Observer	4/5 stars
Pitchfork	8.6/10
Uncut	8/10
Under the Radar	8/10

Aromanticism received widespread acclaim from critics. At Metacritic, which assigns a normalized rating out of 100 to reviews from mainstream publications, the album received an average score of 85, based on 15 reviews. Brian Josephs of Spin gave a positive review, stating, "The dreamy project leaves the snide social critiques and radicalisms to the wayside for 36 minutes that feel of its own realm, where the dichotomies and bodily desire feel self-contained. The intimacy is never lost within the set's high concept: For an album centered on lonesomeness, AROMANTICISM feels warm." Aromanticism was named "Best New Music", with Pitchfork reviewer Jason King calling it "a musical detoxification from the exhausting stream of information that now constitutes a normal day of news." In his review, Greg Kot of the Chicago Tribune wrote: "The songs run together, serene yet troubled, beautiful yet bruised. They are built to linger." Nina Corcoran of Consequence of Sound praised the album, stating: "It requires multiple listens. In turn, that helps the listener grow, revealing spaces where their own narrative and experiences can intertwine with his—not in a romantic sense, but in an educational sense. As a result, Aromanticism already has become and promises to remain one of the most emotionally therapeutic albums of the year."

The Los Angeles Times called it "breathtakingly beautiful", writing, "Sumney places layer upon layer of his voice into tracks until he achieves Beach Boys-esque harmony." Anna Alger of Exclaim! said: "With Aromanticism, Moses Sumney creates a harmonious world in which he speaks from a position that isn't often recognized. Sumney approaches the complexities of relationships, power structures and an inability to experience romantic love with a quiet, powerful confidence." Harriet Gibsone of The Guardian wrote: "When music sounds this complete and absorbing, it's a wonder we waste our lives chasing coexistence with sweaty, needy humans anyway." Kitty Empire of The Observer gave the album a positive review, calling Sumney's falsetto "celestial" but felt the underuse of his lower register was a drawback. Shahzaib Hussain of Clash echoed the same sentiment, calling Sumney's lower register "a cottony, sinewy part of his arsenal reduced to a mere cameo."

=== Accolades ===
Publication	Accolade	Rank	Ref.
Bandcamp Daily	The Best Albums of 2017	1	
Consequence of Sound	Top 50 Albums of 2017	12	
Exclaim!	Top 10 Soul and R&B Albums of 2017	6	
The New York Times	Jon Pareles' Best Albums of 2017	3	
NPR	The 50 Best Albums of 2017	14	
Pitchfork	The 50 Best Albums of 2017	6	
Pitchfork	The 200 Best Albums of the 2010s	106	
PopMatters	The 60 Best Albums of 2017	46	
Spin	50 Best Albums of 2017	10	
Stereogum	The 50 Best Albums of 2017	19	

== Track listing ==
Credits are adapted from the album's liner notes.

No.	Title	Writer(s)	Producer(s)	Length
1.	"Man on the Moon (Reprise)"	Moses Sumney	Sumney	0:36
2.	"Don't Bother Calling"	Sumney	Sumney	3:59
3.	"Plastic"	Sumney	Sumney; Joshua Willing Halpern	3:08
4.	"Quarrel"	Sumney; Cameron Osteen; Paris Strother	Sumney; Cam O'bi; Willing Halpern	6:45
5.	"Stoicism"	Sumney	Sumney	1:02
6.	"Lonely World"	Sumney; Stephen Bruner	Sumney; Gueorgui Linev; Willing Halpern^{[a]}; Trayer Tryon^{[a]}	4:48
7.	"Make Out in My Car"	Sumney	Sumney; Matt Otto; Willing Halpern	2:35
8.	"The Cocoon-Eyed Baby"	Sumney	Sumney	1:09
9.	"Doomed"	Sumney; Otto	Sumney; Otto	4:27
10.	"Indulge Me"	Sumney	Sumney	3:16
11.	"Self-Help Tape"	Sumney; Ludwig Göransson	Göransson; Sumney	3:01
Total length:				34:46

Notes

- ^{^[a]} signifies an additional producer.

== Personnel ==
Musicians

- Moses Sumney – vocals, bass guitar (track 2), guitar (tracks 3, 7, 10, 11), synthesizers (tracks 6, 10)
- Rob Moose – string arrangement and performance (track 2)
- Miguel Atwood-Ferguson – string arrangement and performance (track 3)
- Brandee Younger – harp (track 4)
- Rashaan Carter – upright bass (track 4)
- Jamire Williams – drums (track 4)
- Thundercat – bass guitar (tracks 4, 6)
- Paris Strother – piano and synthesizer arrangements (track 4)
- Joshua Willing Halpern – guitar (tracks 4–6, 8)
- Mike Rocha – horns (tracks 5, 6)
- Ian Chang – drums (track 6)
- Tosin Abasi – guitar (track 6)
- Tracy Wannomae – flute (track 7), clarinet (track 7)
- Nicole Miglis – flute (track 7)
- Matt Otto – synthesizers (track 9)
- Ludwig Göransson – guitar (track 11), bass guitar (track 11), synthesizer (track 11)

Engineers

- Joshua Willing Halpern – engineering (tracks 1–7, 9, 10), mixing (tracks 1, 5, 8)
- Matt Otto – engineering (tracks 2, 10)
- Michael Harris – engineering (track 4)
- Rashaan Carter – engineering (track 4)
- Moses Sumney – engineering (tracks 5, 8, 10)
- Gueorgui Linev – engineering (track 6)
- Billy Mims – engineering (track 6)
- Trayer Tryon – engineering (track 6)
- Ben Baptie – mixing (tracks 2–4, 6, 7, 9–11)
- Ted Jensen – mastering

Artwork

- Eric Gyamfi – photography
- Sean Walker – additional photography (pages 13, 14)
- Julian Gross – design

== Charts ==
Chart (2017)	Peak position
Belgian Albums (Ultratop Flanders)	139
