= Adult Jazz =

English art rock band

- Origin: Leeds, United Kingdom
- Genres: Art rock; post-rock; experimental
- Years active: 2010–present
- Labels: Spare Thought; Tri Angle
- Members: Harry Burgess; Tim Slater; Tom Howe; Steven Wells

Adult Jazz is an English art rock band, formed in Leeds in 2010 by members Harry Burgess, Tim Slater, Tom Howe, and Steven Wells.

== History ==
Adult Jazz was established in 2010 at the University of Leeds. Members Harry Burgess, Tim Slater, and Steven Wells are all originally from Guildford. In January 2014, they released the 12" vinyl single Am Gone / Springful; in August of that year, the band released their debut full-length album, Gist Is, on their own label, Spare Thought. The album garnered positive critical reception, with David Peschek, writing in The Quietus, positioning it "at the sharpest edge of the expression of queer experience in pop music" The record caught the ear of other artists: cellist and producer Oliver Coates covered the album's opening song "Hum"; Bjork attended a 2014 show of the band's in Reykjavík, later writing about the experience for Art in America magazine; Shabazz Palaces remixed their song "Springful"; and the group were invited to play 2015's Meltdown festival at the Royal Festival Hall in London, curated by David Byrne.

In 2016, Adult Jazz released a mini-album titled Earrings Off! on Tri Angle. The record explored harsher digital textures than Gist Is. Critical reception was mixed; Andrew Harrison of Drowned in Sound called it a "brave, intriguing release [...] cement[ing] Adult Jazz as a band you can't really afford to ignore". Chris Ingalls of PopMatters was more overall critical, noting how "you really have to be in the mood for it" and singling out the song "Pumped from Above" as "being weird for the sake of being weird, [...] therefore [being] the album's biggest flaw"; nonetheless, he stated that "when Earrings Off! is good, it's very, very good". The lead single from the album, "Earrings Off!", was remixed by Norwegian musician Jenny Hval. Later that year, the band worked with Okay Kaya on a double A-side single, featuring a cover of the Curtis Mayfield song "Keep On Pushing".

Between 2018 and 2019, Burgess worked with the English electronic musician Lil Data for the musical project Offer. In 2020, Adult Jazz and Daniel Lopatin co-produced the song "Cut Me" from American musician Moses Sumney's album Græ, which was placed at #12 on Pitchfork's list of the best songs of 2020.

In January 2024, the band returned with the single "Dusk Song", their first release in eight years, followed by two more singles, "Suffer One" and "Marquee", for an upcoming album. On 26 April 2024, the band released their second full-length album, So Sorry So Slow. Clash's Nick Roseblade noted the album's slower pace, but praised the lyricism and subversive melodies, writing that the group remains "a powerhouse of skewed pop". In a review for Bandcamp's "Album of the Day", Ted Davis wrote that "these songs swirl and jitter at random, hinting at a virtuosic collective consciousness. The unpredictability at the heart of the album elicits a warm, deja vu-like energy. It’s like the pleasant experience of a foggy teenage memory resurfacing out of the blue".

== Discography ==
Studio albums

- Gist Is (2014, Spare Thought)
- Earrings Off! (2016, Tri Angle)
- So Sorry So Slow (2024, Spare Thought)

Singles

- Am Gone / Springful (2014, Spare Thought)
