= Tom Gallo =

American singer-songwriter

- Genres: indie-R&B, folk, ambient
- Occupations: Musician, singer-songwriter, composer
- Instruments: Vocals, piano, guitar, drums, percussion, bass, samplers
- Years active: 2018–present
- Label: Record Collection
- Website: tomgallo.now

Tom Gallo is an American singer-songwriter and composer whose work spans recorded music, film, advertising, and television. He has been featured in Billboard Magazine, Paper Magazine and on NPR's popular music show All Songs Considered, where his music was described as "spare and minimal, emotional and atmospheric".

== Career ==
Gallo's college band was chosen by Kanye West and spoken-word artist Malik Yusef to be featured on an album of theirs alongside John Legend, and Common. The album was released, but quickly pulled out of stores over copyright issues. Gallo quit music. Then, on a whim, bought some cheap gear and spent a weekend recording his own music for the first time. He sent the music to Sigur Rós producer Alex Somers, who invited him to Iceland to work in his private studio. These obscure recordings, performed primarily with prepared pianos, field recordings, and spoons played on soup bowls, turned into Gallo's debut EP Continuation Day and landed him a record deal with Malibu, California based Record Collection and a publishing deal with Warp.

In the spring of 2018, Gallo recorded his debut full length album, alone at home with a nylon string guitar and a cheap microphone. This music was heard by Grammy award winner Tchad Blake who offered to mix the album.

“Tell Me The Ghost", the title track, features soft guitar riffs and Gallo's whispery vocals, accompanied by a music video described by Billboard Magazine as "mesmerizing". While the track was the last one written for the album, Gallo felt it was a perfect summary of the entire LP. The black-and-white video, was shot in a house where blues icon Lead Belly lived towards the end of his career, in Laurel Canyon, Los Angeles.

In December 2019, Moses Sumney released a single co-written by Gallo entitled "Polly", which will appear on Sumney's second album, græ. The song received "Best New Track" by Pitchfork and gathered over a million streams worldwide in less than two weeks.

In October 2021, Gallo's song "Tell Me the Ghost" appeared in the John Ridley film Needle in a Timestack starring Leslie Odom Jr, Cynthia Erivo, Orlando Bloom, and Freida Pinto.

In February 2022, the first single, "The Drumming", from Gallo's upcoming second album, was dubbed a "New Song You Need To Hear Now" by Paper Magazine calling it a "a chic and atmospheric piece of indie-R&B that sets a serene, enveloping tone for his forthcoming album."

In July 2025, Gallo composed the score for an experimental film for Google and Moncler called "From the Mountains to the City". The film sparked conversation on social media and was shown at Cannes Lions 2025 Festival.

In 2026, Gallo’s music was used across television programming in the United States and Europe, including broadcasts in France, the Netherlands, and Norway.

== Discography ==
=== Studio albums ===
- Tell Me the Ghost (2018)
- Vanish and Bloom (2022)

=== EPs ===
- Continuation Day (2013)

== Features ==
- Beautiful Desolation (Narrated by Tom Gallo) from the album Goûter + by Lou Val (2023)

== Co-writing ==
- "Polly" from the album græ by Moses Sumney (2019)
- Beautiful Desolation (Narrated by Tom Gallo) from the album Goûter + by Lou Val (2023)

== Production ==
- Beautiful Desolation (Narrated by Tom Gallo) from the album Goûter + by Lou Val (2023)
- raindown from the album Goûter + by Lou Val (2023)
- Outlander from the album Pivot// by Lou Val (2024)

== Scoring ==
- "The Palisades" written and directed by Carissa Gallo, starring Kaia Gerber, Taylor Cooper, and Esther-Rose McGregor. (2021)
- "From the Mountains to the City" for Google, and Moncler, along with Advertising Agency R/GA. (2025)
