= Polly (Moses Sumney song) =

Single by Moses Sumney

from the album Græ
- Released: December 13, 2019
- Length: 4:16
- Label: Jagjaguwar
- Songwriter(s): Moses Sumney; Tom Gallo
- Producer(s): Moses Sumney

Moses Sumney singles chronology
"Virile" (2019)	"Polly" (2019)	"Me in 20 Years" (2020)

Music video
- "Virile" on YouTube

"Polly" is a song recorded by American singer-songwriter Moses Sumney. It was released on December 13, 2019, as the second single from his second studio album Græ through Jagjaguwar.

The song was written by Sumney with American singer-songwriter Tom Gallo. Sumney also solely produced the track.

== Composition ==
The song was described by Elizabeth Aubrey of NME as a "gentle acoustic ballad".

Lyrically, Marcus J. Moore of Entertainment Weekly stated the song "delves into the frustrations that arise in situationships" as Sumney "volleys between joy and sadness, satisfaction and restlessness". Grady Penna of Beats Per Minute observed that Sumney explored the dynamic of polyamory and unrequited affection through lines: "I want to be cotton candy / In the mouth of many a lover / Saccharine and slick technicolor / I'll dissolve". Sumney also "croons about giving himself an octopus hug, the downside of competing interests, and the desire to dance in time with another lover", as described by Nina Corcoran of Consequence of Sound. Tom Breihan of Stereogum interpreted the lyrics was about "a confused, ambiguous sexual relationship".

== Critical reception ==
Upon its release, Pitchfork named it as the "Best New Track". Contributor Colin Lodewick connected the track to Sumney's 2017 single, "Doomed" in which Sumney questioned "whether it is okay not to feel love at all". While reviewing "Polly", Lodewick stated that the track "finds him finally full of love, but forced to contend with the truth that he's not loved equally in return". David Crone of AllMusic commended Sumney to sound "transcendent". "Polly" also was described as a "stunning intimate space" and was compared to the work of Bon Iver. While reviewing the associated album, Pitchfork's contributor Jayson Greene described the music as "devastating" and "resonant". "...exists only by the grace of his calloused hands fingerpicking a simple pattern and his voice, which does more to generate cosmos than all the prodigious talents on græ combined", Greene added. A.D. Amorosi of Variety called the song "folky", "open" and "humble". Amorosi further added: "[The song is] allowing Sumney to hold his notes [...] as if holding his breath while submersed in icy water".

== Music video ==
The accompanying music video of "Polly" was released the same day as the track. It features Sumney cries as he stares into the camera, acting out and reacting to the lyrics. Jayson Greene of Pitchfork called the video as Sumney's "most exalted work".

== Live performances ==
Sumney performed the song as a part of NPR's Tiny Desk Concerts session, released on August 10, 2020.

== Personnel ==
- Moses Sumney – vocals, songwriting, production, engineering, synths
- Ben Baptie – engineering
- Tom Gallo – songwriting, engineering, guitar
- Joe LaPorta – mastering
- Ricardo Wheelock – engineering

Credits adapted from the liner notes of Græ.
