= Summer's End (disambiguation) =

Summer's End is a 1999 Canadian-American TV film.

Summer's End may also refer to:

- Summer's End, a 2004 album by Autumn
- "Summer's End", a song by Amorphis from Tuonela, 1999
- "Summer's End", a song by Devon Welsh from Dream Songs, 2018
- "Summer's End", a song by DragonForce from Maximum Overload, 2014
- "Summer's End", a song by the Foo Fighters from Echoes, Silence, Patience & Grace, 2007
- "Summer's End", a song by John Prine from The Tree of Forgiveness, 2018
- "Summer's End", a song by Kiuas from Lustdriven, 2010

== See also ==
- End of Summer (disambiguation)
