= Devon Welsh =

Canadian musician

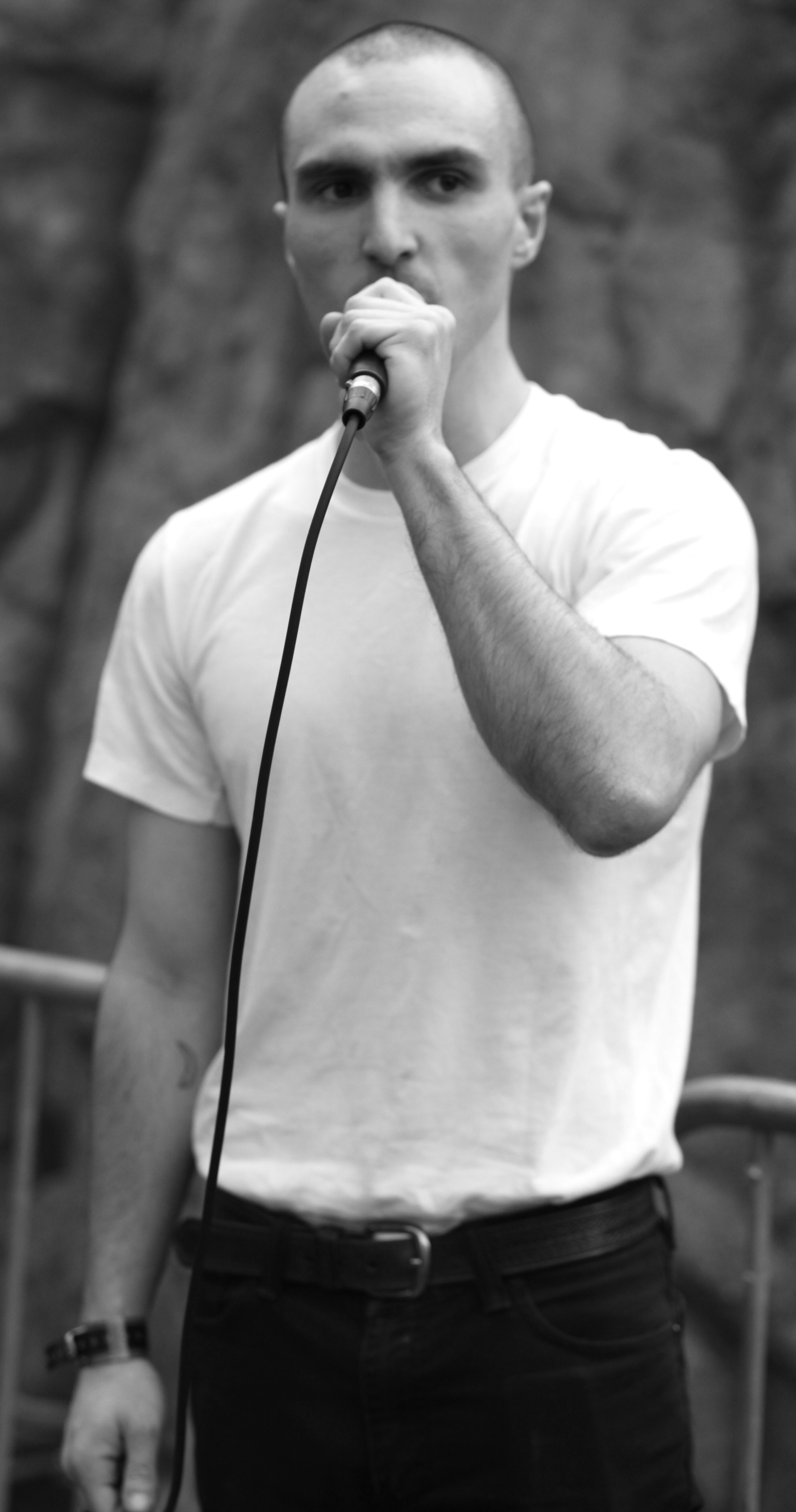
- Welsh performing with Majical Cloudz at SXSW 2013

Background information
- Born: September 3, 1988 (age 37)
- Origin: Montreal, Quebec, Canada
- Occupations: Singer; songwriter
- Instrument: Vocals
- Years active: 2008–present
- Label: You Are Accepted
- Formerly of: Majical Cloudz; Belave
- Website: devonwelsh.com

Devon Welsh (born September 3, 1988) is a Canadian singer and songwriter. From 2010 to 2016, he was the frontman of the electropop duo Majical Cloudz. He released his debut solo album, Dream Songs, in 2018.

== Early life and education ==
Welsh was born to film and television actor Kenneth Welsh. He lived in Sandford, Ontario, a community of Uxbridge, for a few years. His parents separated when he was four. He entered McGill University in 2007 and graduated in 2011 with a degree in comparative religion.

== Career ==
Welsh released his debut solo album, Dream Songs, on August 24, 2018. The album was produced by Austin Tufts of Braids and self-released on You Are Accepted, a record label created by Welsh.

== Personal life ==
From 2007 to 2010, Welsh was in an on-and-off relationship with Claire Boucher, known professionally as Grimes. The two met in 2007 at a first-year dorm party while studying at McGill University.

== Discography ==
=== Solo albums ===
- Dream Songs (2018)
- True Love (2019)
- Come with Me If You Want to Live (2024)

=== Compilation albums ===
- Down the Mountain (2016)

=== With Belave ===
- Darlet on the Brush (2014)
- Indigo, Streams, Lash. (2016)
- the world is rain. (2017)

=== With Majical Cloudz ===
- Majical Cloudz (2010)
- II (2011)
- Impersonator (2013)
- Are You Alone? (2015)
