= Græ =

Studio album by Moses Sumney
- Released: May 15, 2020
- Genres: Art pop; art rock; avant-jazz; classical; folk
- Length: 65:44
- Label: Jagjaguwar
- Producers: Moses Sumney; Adult Jazz; Ben Baptie; John Congleton; FKJ; Daniel Lopatin; Matthew Otto

Moses Sumney chronology
Aromanticism (2017)	Græ (2020)	Sophcore (2024)

Singles from Græ
- 1. "Virile" Released: November 14, 2019; 2. "Polly" Released: December 13, 2019; 3. "Me in 20 Years" Released: January 6, 2020; 4. "Cut Me" Released: February 7, 2020; 5. "Bless Me" Released: May 11, 2020

Græ is the second studio album by American singer-songwriter Moses Sumney. The double album was released in two parts by Jagjaguwar. The first part was released digitally on February 21, 2020, followed by the full album, including its second part, on May 15, 2020.

Græ features contributions from a wide range of musicians, writers and producers, including Daniel Lopatin, Thundercat, Jill Scott, James Blake, Taiye Selasi, John Congleton, Rob Moose, Ezra Miller, Michael Chabon, Matthew Otto, Ian Chang, and FKJ.

The album was preceded by five singles: "Virile", "Polly", "Me in 20 Years", "Cut Me", and "Bless Me".

== Background and recording ==
Some of the songs on Græ, including "Virile", were recorded by Sumney with drummer Ian Chang of Son Lux and producer/engineer Ben Baptie at Echo Mountain Recording in Asheville, North Carolina. Sumney first lived in Asheville before and during the making of Aromanticism, and Græ is Sumney's first album since officially relocating to Asheville from Los Angeles. The album was mixed by Ben Baptie at Strongroom and mastered by Joe LaPorta at Sterling Sound.

== Release ==
"Virile" was released as the album's first single on November 14, 2019. The album was announced the same day. "Polly" was released as the second single on December 13, 2019, followed by "Me in 20 Years" on January 6, 2020, and "Cut Me" on February 7. Sumney made his US television debut with a performance of the latter track on The Late Show with Stephen Colbert on February 11. The album's first part was released digitally on February 21. "Bless Me" was released as the album's fifth and final single on May 11, 2020, with the full album released four days later.

== Critical reception ==
Professional ratings
Aggregate scores
Source	Rating
AnyDecentMusic?	8.4/10
Metacritic	90/100
Review scores
Source	Rating
AllMusic	4.5/5 stars
The A.V. Club	B+
DIY	5/5 stars
Entertainment Weekly	A
The Independent	4/5 stars
NME	4/5 stars
The Observer	(Part 1) (Part 2)
Pitchfork	8.6/10
Q	(Part 1) (Part 2)
Uncut	8/10

Græ received rave reviews from contemporary music critics. At Metacritic, which assigns a normalised rating out of 100 from reviews from mainstream critics, the album received a score of 90, based on 17 reviews, indicating "universal acclaim". According to Metacritic, it was the 5th best-reviewed album of 2020. Aggregator AnyDecentMusic? gave it 8.4 out of 10, based on their assessment of the critical consensus.

A. D. Amorosi of Variety praised the album, calling it a "magnificent, multi-genre mess in a dress of many colors" and "one of the year's boldest and best". Jenessa Williams of DIY gave the album a perfect score, calling it "complex, unconventional and ultimately, essential". Marcus J. Moore of Entertainment Weekly gave the album an A, writing, "græ finds him trying to be, well, everything, and through a convergence of folk, jazz, classical, and art-rock, along with his probing lyricism, Sumney has managed to produce a sonic marvel".

Max Freedman of The A.V. Club praised Part 1 for showcasing Sumney "step outside previous comfort zones" with "Conveyor", "Neither/Nor", and "Virile". However, Freedman criticized Part 2 as lacking the stylistic and thematic variety of Part 1 and for occupying "shockingly familiar musical territory" to that of the songs on Aromanticism.

=== Year-end lists ===
Year-end list accolades for Græ
Publication	List	Rank	Ref.
The A.V. Club	The 20 best albums of 2020	9	
Clash	Albums of the Year 2020	24	
Double J	The 50 best albums of 2020	22	
Esquire (UK)	The 50 Best Albums of 2020	5	
Exclaim!	50 Best Albums of 2020	16	
The Fader	The 50 best albums of 2020	9	
Gigwise	51 Best Albums of 2020	34	
The Guardian	The 50 best albums of 2020	10	
The Independent	The 40 best albums of 2020	5	
The Line of Best Fit	The Best Albums of 2020	5	
Los Angeles Times	The 10 best albums of 2020	7	
Mojo	The 75 Best Albums of 2020	13	
The New York Times	Jon Pareles' Best Albums of 2020	3	
Paste	The 50 Best Albums of 2020	10	
Pitchfork	The 50 Best Albums of 2020	3	
Rolling Stone	The 50 Best Albums of 2020	18	
Slant Magazine	The 50 Best Albums of 2020	35	
Stereogum	The 50 Best Albums of 2020	40	
Uncut	The Top 75 Albums of the Year	24	
Under the Radar	Top 100 Albums of 2020	2	

== Track listing ==
Credits adapted from the liner notes of Græ.

Part 1
No.	Title	Writer(s)	Producer(s)	Length
1.	"Insula"	Moses Sumney; Taiye Selasi; Ayesha K. Faines	Sumney; Daniel Lopatin^{[a]}	0:46
2.	"Cut Me"	Sumney; Adult Jazz; Lopatin	Adult Jazz; Sumney; Lopatin^{[a]}	4:10
3.	"In Bloom"	Sumney	Sumney; Matthew Otto^{[a]}	3:02
4.	"Virile"	Sumney; YVETTE	Sumney; Andrew Chugg^{[a]}; Ben Baptie^{[a]}; Lopatin^{[a]}	4:16
5.	"Conveyor"	Sumney; YVETTE	Sumney; Andrew Chugg^{[a]}; Ben Baptie^{[a]}; Lopatin^{[a]}	3:23
6.	"Boxes"	Michael Chabon; Ezra Miller; Faines; Selasi; Sumney	Sumney; Lopatin^{[a]}	1:22
7.	"Gagarin"	Sumney; Esbjörn Svensson; Dan Berglund; Magnus Öström	Sumney; Baptie^{[a]}	5:54
8.	"Jill/Jack" (featuring Jill Scott)	Jill Scott; Sumney	Sumney; Lopatin^{[a]}	1:33
9.	"Colouour"	FKJ; Sumney	FKJ; Sumney; Lopatin^{[a]}	3:07
10.	"Also Also Also And And And"	FKJ; Sumney; Selasi; Miller	FKJ; Sumney	1:31
11.	"Neither/Nor"	Sumney	Sumney; Baptie; John Congleton	5:26
12.	"Polly"	Sumney; Tom Gallo	Sumney	3:38
Total length:				38:08

Part 2
No.	Title	Writer(s)	Producer(s)	Length
13.	"Two Dogs"	Lopatin; Sumney	Lopatin; Sumney	3:56
14.	"Bystanders"	Sumney; Otto; Lopatin	Otto; Sumney; Lopatin^{[a]}	4:14
15.	"Me in 20 Years"	Sumney; Otto	Otto; Sumney; Lopatin^{[a]}	3:40
16.	"Keeps Me Alive"	Sumney	Sumney	2:56
17.	"Lucky Me"	Sumney; James Blake	Sumney; Blake^{[a]}; Lopatin^{[a]}	4:57
18.	"And So I Come to Isolation"	Selasi; Sumney	Sumney; Lopatin^{[a]}	0:49
19.	"Bless Me"	Sumney	Sumney; Congleton	4:59
20.	"Before You Go"	Selasi; Michaela Coel; Miller; Sumney	Sumney	2:05
Total length:				27:36

Notes

- ^{^[a]} signifies an additional producer.
- "Insula", "Boxes", "Jill/Jack", "Also Also Also And And And", "And So I Come to Isolation" and "Before You Go" are stylized in all lowercase.
- "Gagarin" contains elements from "Gagarin's Point Of View", written by Esbjörn Svensson, Dan Berglund and Magnus Öström.
- "Jill/Jack" contains interpolations from "Cross My Mind", written by Jill Scott.

== Personnel ==
Credits are adapted from the liner notes of Græ.

Musicians

- Moses Sumney – vocals (all singing and arrangement), piano (2, 3, 11), guitar (3, 11, 19), keyboards (8), bass (11), percussion (11), synthesizers (12), saxophone and flute arrangements (13), additional percussion (19), piano FX (20)
- Thundercat – bass (1, 3, 4, 18)
- Daniel Lopatin – synthesizers (1, 2, 9, 13–15, 18), bass (2), drum programming (2), keyboards (9)
- Rob Moose – strings (1, 3, 4, 17, 18), string arrangement (3, 4, 17)
- Keith Tutt II – strings (1, 18), cello (3, 4)
- Adult Jazz – bass (2), synthesizers (2), horns (2), piano (2)
- Brandon Coleman – bass (2), synthesizers (2, 19), piano (7), additional synthesizers (7)
- Ian Chang – drums (2, 4, 5, 11, 19), drum programming (2), percussion (11, 19)
- Jonathan Slater – horns (2)
- Jamire Williams – drums (3, 7, 8, 19)
- Matthew Otto – synthesizers (3, 14, 15)
- Noah Kardos-Fein – guitar (4, 5)
- Ben Baptie – drum programming (4, 5, 11, 19), additional synthesizers (7), piano FX (20)
- Brandee Younger – harp (4, 13, 18)
- Nubya Garcia – flute (4, 13)
- Mike Haldeman – guitar (5, 6, 19), guitar FX (7, 8)
- John Keek – saxophone (5, 6)
- Shahzad Ismaily – bass synthesizer (7), additional synthesizers (7), bass (8, 19, 20)
- FKJ – saxophone (9), keyboards (9), synthesizers (9), all instrumentation (10)
- Shabaka Hutchings – saxophone (9, 13)
- Tunde Jegede – kora (11)
- Tom Gallo – guitar (12)
- James Blake – drum programming (17), keyboards (17)
- John Congleton – guitar (19), additional percussion (19)
- Jamie Stewart – organ (19), drum programming (19)

Engineers

- Moses Sumney – engineering (1, 3–20)
- Daniel Lopatin – engineering (1, 13, 14, 17)
- Steph Marziano – engineering (2)
- Jake Viator – engineering (2, 5, 7, 8, 15, 19, 20)
- Ricardo Wheelock – engineering (2, 3, 7, 12, 15)
- Matthew Otto – engineering (3, 14, 15)
- Mac DeMarco – engineering (3)
- Andrew Chugg – engineering (4–6)
- Alexis Berthelot – engineering (4–6)
- Ben Baptie – engineering (4, 5, 11, 12, 19, 20), mixing
- Rashaan Carter – engineering (harp on 4, 13, 18)
- Simon Ribchester – engineering (5; piano on 11)
- FKJ – engineering (9, 10)
- Matt Cohn – engineering (9, 13, 17)
- Sean Cook – engineering (11, 19)
- Tom Gallo – engineering (12)
- James Blake – engineering (17)
- Tom Archer – mix assistance
- Joe LaPorta – mastering

Artwork

- Moses Sumney – art direction
- Julian Gross – art direction, design
- Eric Gyamfi – photography

== Charts ==
Chart performance for Græ
Chart (2020)	Peak position
Portuguese Albums (AFP)	44
US Heatseekers Albums (Billboard)	8
US Top Album Sales (Billboard)	28
