= Impersonator (album) =

Studio album by Majical Cloudz
- Released: May 21, 2013
- Length: 38:15
- Label: Matador; Mythryl
- Producer: Devon Welsh; Matthew Otto

Majical Cloudz chronology
II (2011)	Impersonator (2013)	Are You Alone? (2015)

Singles from Sparkle Hard
- 1. "Turns Turns Turns" Released: November 5, 2012; 2. "Childhood's End" Released: March 26, 2013; 3. "Bugs Don't Buzz" Released: May 2, 2013

Impersonator is the third studio album by Canadian pop duo Majical Cloudz, released on May 21, 2013, by Matador Records and Mythryl Records. It was their first album on Matador after signing with the label in February 2013. It was also the group's first album to feature producer Matthew Otto as a member, following the departure of Matthew E. Duffy after the release of II in 2011.

The album was longlisted for the 2013 Polaris Music Prize.

== Release and promotion ==
"Turns Turns Turns" was released on November 5, 2012, as a single from their EP of the same name, which was released on December 3, 2012, by Arbutus Records and Merok Records.

"Childhood's End" was released on March 26, 2013. On April 3, 2013, a music video for "Childhood's End" directed by Emily Kai Bock was released starring Devon Welsh's father Kenneth Welsh.

"Bugs Don't Buzz" was released on May 2, 2013. On June 20, 2013, a music video for "Bugs Don't Buzz" was premiered through NPR. It was directed by Gordon von Steiner and features cockroaches and beetles with miniature furniture and landscaping.

== Critical reception ==
Professional ratings
Aggregate scores
Source	Rating
AnyDecentMusic?	7.2/10
Metacritic	77/100
Review scores
Source	Rating
AllMusic	4.5/5 stars
Consequence of Sound	4/5 stars
Exclaim!	8/10
The Irish Times	4/5 stars
NME	7/10
Pitchfork	8.2/10
PopMatters	8/10
Q	3/5 stars
Rolling Stone	3.5/5 stars
Uncut	6/10

At Metacritic, which assigns a normalised rating out of 100 to reviews from mainstream publications, the album received an average score of 77, based on 23 reviews. Writing for Pitchfork, Jayson Greene praised the album, stating, "Impersonator is a gorgeous record-- extraordinarily sung, hypnotically focused-- but it is Welsh's sense of emotional urgency that makes it special." Fred Thomas of AllMusic said, "With such a wide-open sound, even the confusing and painful parts sound hauntingly beautiful." Writing for Consequence of Sound, Sasha Geffen said, "By paring pop music to its core human elements, Majical Cloudz has written a record that's bare enough to breathe inside. Feeling thrives in the blankness: that's Impersonator's paradox." Brice Ezell of PopMatters' praised Devon Welsh's lyricism and the album's musical simplicity, stating, "Impersonator is an album of intriguing paradox. Its ingredients are so simple that it might have been made in a home or garage studio, but Majical Cloudz' sound is so uniquely and deliberately crafted that it's unlikely just anyone with ProTools could do the same. Welsh's simple sentence-centric lyrics are nothing a budding writer couldn't imitate, but his delivery is more akin to the terse yet resonant style of Ernest Hemingway."

In a less favorable review, Laura Studarus of Under the Radar said, "The majority sounds like demos for a fuller, richer album that Welsh undoubtedly has the skills to write."

=== Year-end lists ===
Publication	Rank	List
Consequence of Sound	33	Top 50 Albums of 2013
Flavorwire	2	25 Favorite Albums of 2013
Pitchfork	8	The Top 50 Albums of 2013
Vice	19	Top 50 Albums of 2013

== Track listing ==
All tracks are written by Devon Welsh.

No.	Title	Length
1.	"Impersonator"	3:10
2.	"This Is Magic"	4:26
3.	"Childhood's End"	3:48
4.	"I Do Sing for You"	4:10
5.	"Mister"	4:12
6.	"Turns Turns Turns"	3:43
7.	"Silver Rings"	5:15
8.	"Illusion"	2:51
9.	"Bugs Don't Buzz"	3:21
10.	"Notebook"	3:19
Total length:		38:15

Impersonator – Deluxe Version
No.	Title	Length
11.	"Savage"	3:40
12.	"Love Soul"	4:23

== Personnel ==
Credits adapted from liner notes.

- Devon Welsh – songwriting, production
- Matthew Otto – production
- Dimitri Condax – mastering
