= Gueorgui Linev =

Bulgarian-American Composer, musician, producer

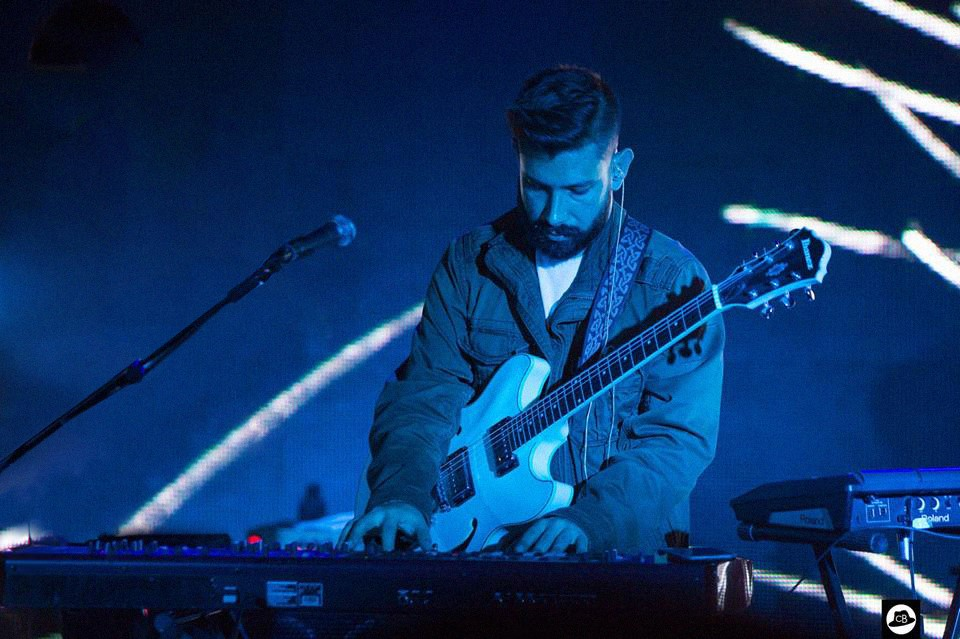
- performing live

Background information
- Birth name: Gueorgui Iliev Linev
- Also known as: Kan Wakan; George Linev
- Origin: Sofia, Bulgaria
- Genres: Electronic, Trip-Hop, Experimental, Orchestral Pop, Psychedelic
- Instruments: Guitar, Piano, Electric Bass Guitar, Drums
- Labels: previously Verve Records

Gueorgui Iliev Linev, known professionally as Kan Wakan, is a Bulgarian-born, Los Angeles and UK-based electronic music producer, composer, songwriter and multi-instrumentalist. Linev has released two studio albums under the name Kan Wakan (Moving On and Phantasmagoria Vol. 1). He has done collaborations with Moses Sumney, Thundercat, and toured with Lianne La Havas, and Arctic Monkeys. Linev wrote the music for Brian Klemesrud's 2016 crime thriller Dead Draw.

== Musical style ==
Gueorgui Linev incorporates both electronic and acoustic instruments into his compositions, often featuring instrumental solos such as his use of harmonica on "Molasses." With Kan Wakan, Linev often uses live orchestras in compliment to Analog Synthesizer, Electric Guitar and Bass, and various other instruments.

His music is described as "touching the borders of trip-hop, acoustic balladry, and psychedelia" according to The Fader. LA Weekly's Jeff Weiss described his music as "Striking a smooth, sinister balance between crepuscular trip-hop and experimental minimalism, Kan Wakan’s debut artfully recalls Air and Portishead, Mazzy Star and The Cinematic Orchestra."

== Career ==
=== Kan Wakan ===
Kan Wakan formed in 2010 and began putting out songs two years later. In 2013, Kan Wakan released its debut EP, produced by Linev and engineered by Grammy Award-winning engineer Darrell Thorp. Those entrancing early tracks quickly earned him airplay on Los Angeles' KCRW radio station, a publisher, management and a contract with Universal's sub-publisher Verve Music Group. The EP featured orchestra performances via the Metamorphosis Chamber Orchestra led by Linev's uncle, Bulgarian Virtuosi Chamber Orchestra conductor Stefan Linev. In 2014, Kan Wakan returned with his debut full-length album, Moving On. Upon release, 'Moving On' peaked at #37 on the Billboard Heatseekers Albums chart. Yahoo! Music listed Kan Wakan as one of the "11 Best New Artists of 2014" and the success of 'Moving On' lead to Gueorgui Linev being named one of "The 10 Best Young L.A. Songwriters" by LA Weekly in 2014.

In August 2016, Kan Wakan released 'Molasses,' which was named "Today's Top Tune" by Los Angeles based radio station KCRW, and premiered in Nylon Magazine. Followed by positive reviews from notable music blogs, including Indie Shuffle, the track hit #2 on Hype Machine. Following the successful momentum of 'Molasses,' Phantasmagoria's second single 'I Would' reached #2 on Hype Machine after Clash Magazine premiered the track, calling it "Absorbing" and was later placed in Indie Shuffle's "Best of October" Playlist.

==== Phantasmagoria Vol. 1 ====
In 2018, Kan Wakan released his second studio album Phantasmagoria Vol. 1. His song Molasses (ft. Elle Olsun) was used on season 1 of the American drama Queen Sugar.

== Discography ==
Singles
Year	Title	Label	Notes
2014	"Forever Found"	Verve Records	
2014	"Like I Need You"	Verve Records	Used in HBO's 2014 Spring Preview
2014	"Why Don't You Save Me"	Verve Records	Insert song in NBC television program State of Affairs, season 1 episode 4: "Bang, Bang"
2016	"Molasses"	MurMur Records	Insert song for Queen Sugar season 1 finale episode "Give Us This Day"
2016	"I Would"	MurMur Records	
2017	"I Had to Laugh"	MurMur Records	

Albums
Release date	Album	Label	Chart Position
June 3, 2014	Moving On	Verve Records	#37 Billboard Heatseekers Albums
March 2015	Moving On Remixed	-	
August 31, 2018	Phantasmagoria Vol. 1	MurMur Music	
