= End of Summer =

End of Summer may refer to:

- The End of Summer, a 1961 Japanese film directed by Yasujirō Ozu
- End of Summer (1995 film), an American film directed by Linda Yellen
- End of Summer (2017 film), a Chinese film directed by Quan Zhou
- End of Summer (TV series), a 2024 Swedish television series
- End of Summer (OVA), a 1994 anime for the Dōkyūsei video games
- End of Summer (play), a 1936 play by S. N. Behrman
- "End of Summer" (song), a 2025 song by Tame Impala

== See also ==
- Summer's End (disambiguation)
- End of Winter, a 2014 South Korean film
