= Dream Songs =

Studio album by Devon Welsh
- Released: August 24, 2018
- Studio: Austin Tufts' studio, Montreal, Quebec
- Genre: Chamber pop
- Length: 40:55
- Label: You Are Accepted
- Producer: Austin Tufts

Devon Welsh chronology
Down the Mountain (2016)	Dream Songs (2018)	True Love (2019)

Singles from Dream Songs
- 1. "I'll Be Your Ladder" Released: May 15, 2018; 2. "Vampires" Released: June 15, 2018; 3. "By the Daylight" Released: July 20, 2018

Dream Songs is the debut solo album by Canadian musician Devon Welsh. It was self-released through digital download on August 24, 2018 on Welsh's own label You Are Accepted. It was Welsh's first studio album as a solo artist since he and producer Matthew Otto concluded their musical project Majical Cloudz in 2016.

Written by Welsh, the album was recorded and produced by Braids' Austin Tufts in his Montreal studio. The album marked a clear departure from the electronic pop sound of Welsh's previous work to a more melodic, chamber pop sound with traditional instruments like guitar, piano, and orchestral strings.

== Release ==
Dream Songs was self-released by Welsh through his own newly created record label You Are Accepted. In contrast, the last two Majical Cloudz albums were distributed by Matador Records. In an interview with Billboard, Welsh explained, "I like making music, and I like putting it out there and having people listen to it. The stuff in the middle was stressful to me. I wanted to do it in a way where it was me making the choices and me taking the risks, where I felt like I didn’t have to take a label's vision into account -- or the expectations of anybody else in terms of what success would be defined as."

== Critical reception ==
Professional ratings
Review scores
Source	Rating
Exclaim!	7/10
Pitchfork	6.9/10
PopMatters	7/10
Spectrum Culture	4/5 stars
Under the Radar	7.5/10

Reviewing the album for Exclaim!, Matt Bobkin stated that, "Dream Songs pushes Welsh's songcraft forward without abandoning his strengths." Writing for Pitchfork, Evan Rytlewski called Dream Songs an "unflinchingly candid debut solo album" and praised its instrumentation, calling it a "backdrop of lovely, spacious music that grants Welsh's pliable voice full freedom to preen, wander, and soar." BrooklynVegan's Andrew Sacher deemed the album "bigger and more complex, but not so much so that it ruins the intimacy that always made Devon's music appealing" and said, "When Devon rings out his notes, you can feel the passion that's driving every single word. These songs tend to be delicate, but they aren't passive. The emotional weight in these songs is so heavy, that even the quietest moments have no trouble commanding your attention."

== Track listing ==
All tracks are written by Devon Welsh.

No.	Title	Length
1.	"By the Daylight"	3:27
2.	"Summer's End"	4:51
3.	"Dreams Have Pushed You Around"	4:30
4.	"Vision"	4:47
5.	"Comedian"	2:40
6.	"Chances"	4:44
7.	"Vampires"	3:55
8.	"I'll Be Your Ladder"	4:54
9.	"Over the Sky"	3:34
10.	"Take It Easy"	3:33
Total length:		40:55

== Personnel ==
Credits adapted from Bandcamp and Discogs.

- Devon Welsh – songwriting, string arrangement
- Thomas Beard – cello
- Ben Dwyer – double bass
- Christopher Honeywell – cover photograph
- Kyle Jukka – guitar (on "Summer's End")
- Kate Maloney – violin
- Austin Milne – saxophone (on "I'll Be Your Ladder")
- Harris Newman – mastering
- Austin Tufts – production, string arrangement
- Christoph Vandory – viola
