= Song Reader =

2012 sheet music book by Beck

- Author: Beck
- Language: English
- Genre: Sheet music
- Publisher: McSweeney's (US); Faber & Faber (UK)
- Publication date: December 11, 2012
- Publication place: United States
- Media type: Print (Hardcover)
- Pages: 108
- ISBN: 978-1938073380
- Website: SongReader.net

Song Reader is a book of sheet music by the American alternative music artist Beck released on December 11, 2012. The book includes 20 songs worth of sheet music and more than 100 pages of art. The book's publisher, McSweeney's, also announced that versions of the songs performed by other musicians would be featured on its website. Links to YouTube and SoundCloud performances of the songs can be contributed to the official web site for the project.

Beck began working on the project in 2004. In 2013 Beck played three concerts with a variety of guests featuring the Song Reader material. He released a record of Song Reader with other musicians in 2014, and plans to release a compilation of fan versions.

Rolling Stone named it 50th on their list of 50 best albums of 2013. The official CD featuring various artists was released on July 29, 2014.

== Song list ==
No.	Title	Contributing artist	Length
1.	"Title of This Song"	Moses Sumney	4:55
2.	"Please Leave a Light on When You Go"	Fun.	2:42
3.	"The Wolf Is on the Hill"	Tweedy	2:22
4.	"Just Noise"	Norah Jones	2:00
5.	"Last Night You Were a Dream"	Lord Huron	3:23
6.	"Saint Dude"	Bob Forrest	4:06
7.	"I'm Down"	Jack White	3:04
8.	"Heaven's Ladder"	Beck	3:17
9.	"Don't Act Like Your Heart Isn't Hard"	Juanes	3:27
10.	"Sorry"	Laura Marling	2:04
11.	"Eyes That Say "I Love You""	Jarvis Cocker	3:18
12.	"Rough on Rats"	David Johansen	2:48
13.	"Now That Your Dollar Bills Have Sprouted Wings"	Jason Isbell	5:13
14.	"The Last Polka"	Marc Ribot	4:33
15.	"Old Shanghai"	Eleanor Friedberger	2:55
16.	"Why Did You Make Me Care?"	Sparks	4:40
17.	"America, Here's My Boy"	Swamp Dogg	3:04
18.	"We All Wear Cloaks"	Jack Black	2:30
19.	"Do We? We Do"	Loudon Wainwright III	2:51
20.	"Mutilation Rag"	Gabriel Kahane, yMusic	2:08
Total length:			63:20
