= Brandee Younger =

American harpist & composer (born 1983)

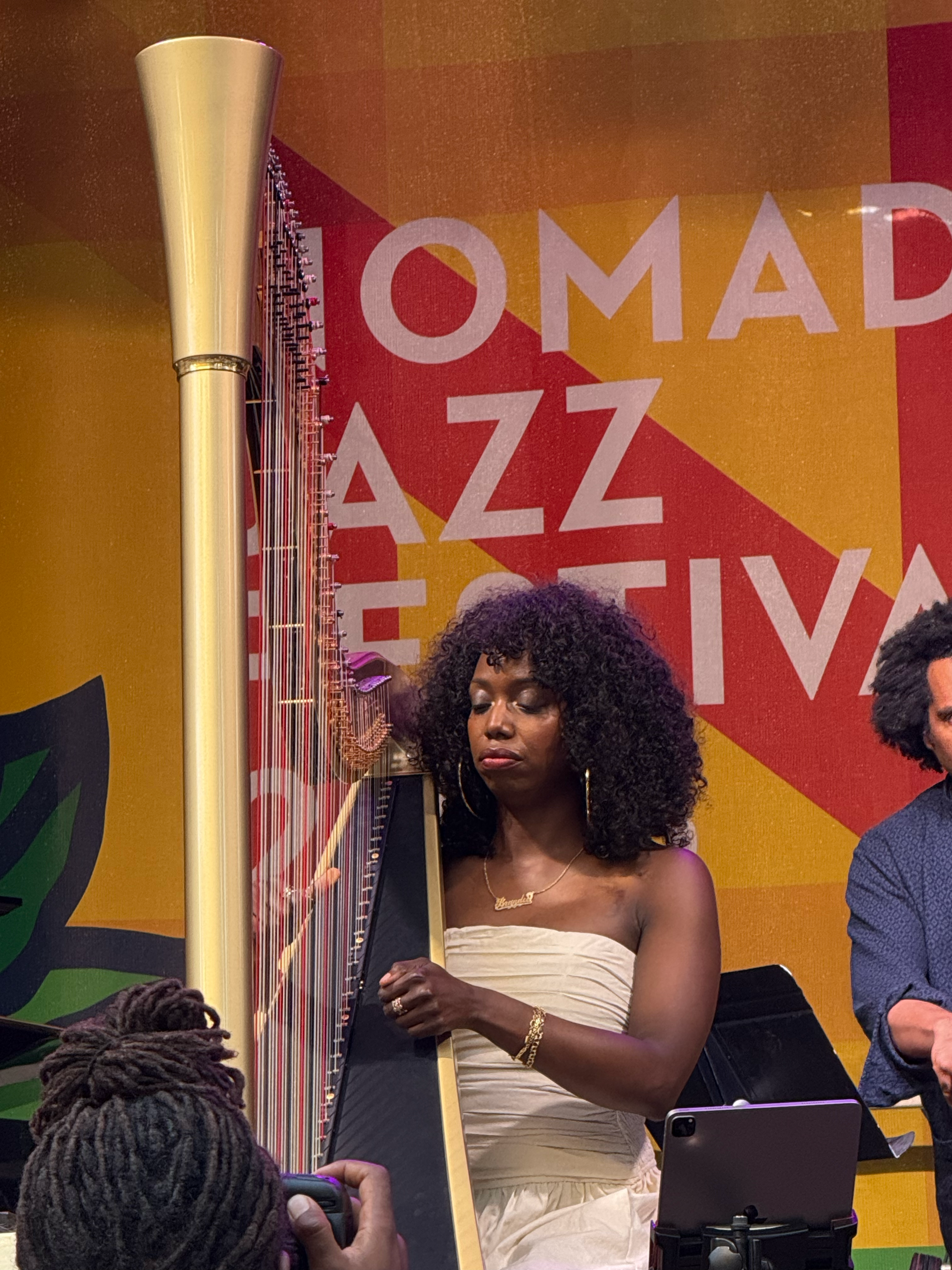
- Younger at the NoMad Jazz Festival in 2025

Background information
- Born: July 1, 1983 (age 43)
- Origin: Hempstead, New York, US
- Education: The Hartt School; New York University
- Genres: Jazz, classical, pop
- Occupations: Harpist, composer, educator
- Instrument: Harp
- Years active: 2006–present
- Label: Impulse/Verve/Universal
- Website: www.brandeeyounger.com

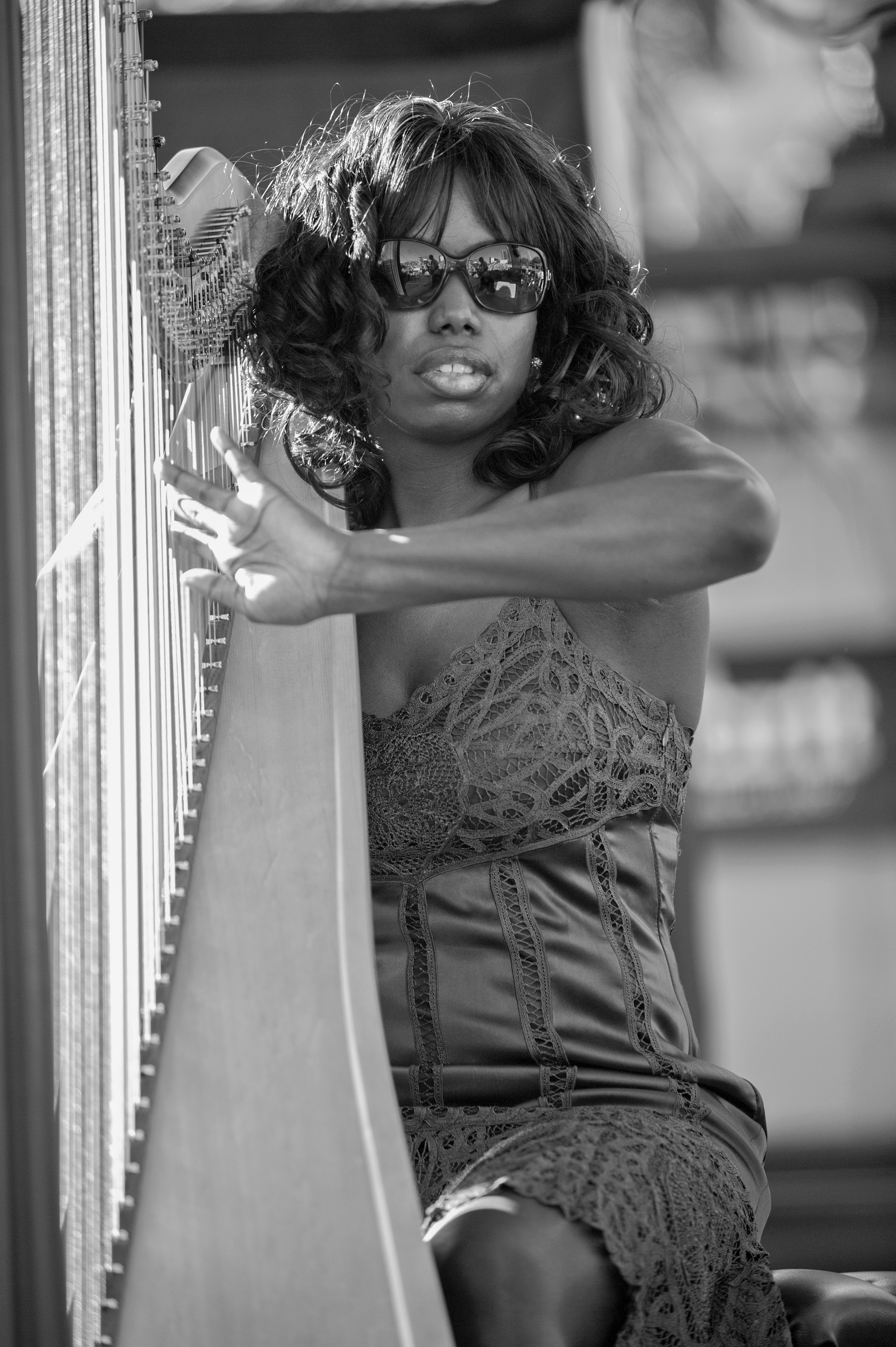
Brandee Younger, Detroit International Jazz Festival by Marek Lazarski

Brandee Younger (born July 1, 1983) is an American harpist, composer, and educator.

== Early life and education ==
Younger was born and raised in Hempstead, New York. She developed an early interest in music, leading her to pursue undergraduate degrees in Harp Performance and Music Management at The Hartt School of Music in West Hartford, Connecticut. She later earned a Master of Music degree at New York University (NYU) Steinhardt.

== Career ==
=== 2006–2015: Early career and collaborations ===
Throughout her early career, Younger worked with a diverse range of artists across genres, including Pharoah Sanders, Ravi Coltrane, Jack DeJohnette, Common, John Legend, Cassie, The Roots, and Lauryn Hill. Her work helped redefine the role of the harp in contemporary jazz, hip-hop, and popular music.

Younger made her public debut in 2007 as a grad student at NYU, when saxophonist Ravi Coltrane enlisted the then 23-year-old to participate in the memorial service for his mother Alice.

=== 2016–2019: Solo projects and recognition ===
In 2016, Younger released Wax & Wane, showcasing her innovative approach to the harp. This was followed by Soul Awakening in 2019, which was met with critical acclaim for blending jazz, soul, and spiritual influences.

In 2019, Younger's original composition "Hortense" was featured Beyoncé's Netflix concert documentary Homecoming. The recording used was from an NPR Music Field recording released in 2013.

=== 2020–present: Major label debut and historic achievements ===
In 2020, Younger released Force Majeure, a duo album with bassist Dezron Douglas recorded during the COVID-19 lockdown, praised for its intimacy and spontaneity.

Her major label debut, Somewhere Different, arrived in 2021 via Impulse! Records. The album earned her a 2022 Grammy nomination for Best Instrumental Composition for "Beautiful Is Black", making her the first Black woman nominated in that category.

In 2023, she released Brand New Life, an album paying tribute to harpist Dorothy Ashby, while continuing to push the instrument forward. The album won the 2024 NAACP Image Award for Outstanding Jazz Album.

Younger's contributions have cemented her as a leading force in contemporary jazz, known for her ability to bridge genres and expand the possibilities of the harp.

== Educational contributions ==
Younger serves on the teaching artist faculty at New York University and The New School College of Performing Arts. She has conducted master classes and residencies at institutions such as Howard University, University of Michigan, Berklee College of Music, Tulane University, and Princeton University.

== Awards and honors ==
- 2025: Doris Duke Artist Award recipient, recognizing exceptional achievement in jazz.
- 2024: NAACP Image Award winner for Outstanding Jazz Album for Brand New Life.
- 2023: DownBeat Critics Poll winner in the “Miscellaneous Instrument” (harpist) category.
- 2023: Jazz Music Awards nominee for Best Mainstream Artist and Best Mainstream Album for Somewhere Different.
- 2022: Edison Award winner for International Jazz Album for Somewhere Different.
- 2022: NAACP Image Award nominee for Outstanding Jazz Album – Instrumental for Somewhere Different.
- 2022: Grammy Award nominee for Best Instrumental Composition for “Beautiful Is Black”.
- 2020: DownBeat Critics Poll winner in the "Rising Star" harpist category.

== Personal life ==
Younger is the cousin of urban farmer and MacArthur Fellow Will Allen, and Jordan Younger, former cornerback of the Toronto Argonauts.

== Discography ==
=== As leader ===
- 2011: Prelude, Independent
- 2014: The Brandee Younger 4tet, Live at the Breeding Ground, Independent
- 2016: Wax & Wane, Independent / Revive Music
- 2019: Soul Awakening, Independent
- 2020: Force Majeure, International Anthem
- 2021: Somewhere Different, Impulse!
- 2023: Brand New Life, Impulse!
- 2025: Gadabout Season, Impulse!

=== Compilations ===
- 2015: Supreme Sonacy, Blue Note Records / Revive Music
- 2018: A Day in the Life: Impressions of Pepper, Impulse!

=== As sideperson/contributor ===
- 2006: Cassie, Cassie
- 2007: Finding Forever, Common
- 2008: In This Day, E.J. Strickland
- 2008: Overdose On Life, featuring Drake, Mickey Factz, and Travis McCoy from Gym Class Heroes, Omen (record producer)
- 2009: Of Song, Marcus Strickland
- 2009: Blending Times, Ravi Coltrane
- 2012: Retox, Lakecia Benjamin
- 2012: Moments, Michael Campagna
- 2013: New York: A Love Story, Mack Wilds
- 2013: Love in the Future, John Legend
- 2014: Face Forward, Jeremy Pelt
- 2016: Everything's Beautiful, Robert Glasper, Miles Davis
- 2016: The Dreaming Room, Laura Mvula
- 2016: Rebel/Find it Hard to Say, Ms Lauryn Hill
- 2016: The Songbook Sessions: Ella Fitzgerald, Jane Monheit
- 2017: Bringin' It, Christian McBride Big Band
- 2017: Residente, Residente
- 2017: Aromanticism, Moses Sumney
- 2018: Universal Beings, Makaya McCraven
- 2018: Old Fashioned Gal, Kat Edmonson
- 2019: Sex High, Salaam Remi & James Fauntleroy
- 2019: Resavoir, Resavoir
- 2019: Dreams, Fairytales, Fantasies, A$AP Ferg ft Brent Faiyaz & Salaam Remi
- 2019: Poetry in Motion, The Soul Rebels
- 2020: Dreamers Do, Kat Edmonson
- 2020: I Think I'm Good, Kassa Overall
- 2020: We're New Again, Gil Scott-Heron, Makaya McCraven
- 2020: Pursuance: The Coltranes, Lakecia Benjamin
- 2020: Græ, Moses Sumney
- 2020: Harmony, Josh Groban
- 2020: Lagos and Pepper Soup, Michael Olatuja
- 2020: Universal Beings E&F sides, Makaya McCraven
- 2020: Black Love, Salaam Remi ft. Teedra Moses & D-Nice
- 2020: Until this Day, Salaam Remi ft. Case
- 2020: VOYAGE-19, Bilal
- 2020: Petestrumentals 3, Pete Rock
- 2021: Private Space, Durand Jones & The Indications
- 2021: Satori Ways, Max Herre Web Web
- 2021: Talk Memory, BadBadNotGood
- 2021: Donda, Kanye West
- 2022: In These Times, Makaya McCraven
- 2023: The Omnichord Real Book, Meshell Ndegeocello
- 2023: Fine Tune, Terrace Martin
- 2024: Perceive Its Beauty, Acknowledge Its Grace, Shabaka Hutchings
- 2024: Shadow, Lizz Wright
- 2025: Cabin in the Sky, De La Soul
- 2026: Trip the Night Fantastic, Terri Lyne Carrington
- 2026: The Color of Rain, Aja Monet
