= Gist Is =

Studio album by Adult Jazz
- Released: 4 August 2014
- Recorded: 2011–2014
- Studios: The Black Byre (Edinburgh, Scotland)
- Genres: Art rock; art pop; post-rock; experimental
- Length: 51:05
- Label: Spare Thought
- Producer: Tom Howe

Adult Jazz chronology
Gist Is (2014)	Earrings Off! (2016)

Gist Is 10 cover

Gist Is is the debut studio album by English art rock band Adult Jazz, released on 4 August 2014 by their own label, Spare Thought.

== Background and recording ==
Adult Jazz was formed in Leeds in 2010 by friends Harry Burgess, Tim Slater, Tom Howe, and Steven Wells. Burgess, Slater, and Wells grew up in Guildford together, with Slater and Burgess having participated in a drama club together; Burgess states, however, that the three "weren't proper friends then—[they] started hanging out when [they] were 15 or 16". The three attended the University of Leeds together, where they later met Tom Howe through a mutual friend of theirs named Kyle, whose father they used the studio of during the recording of Gist Is. Prior to attending university, Burgess, Slater and Wells had already begun experimenting with making music together; Burgess states: "I'd written some insular stuff all tethered to a drum machine, but we got frustrated with not writing to a live rhythm".

Gist Is was recorded from approximately late 2010 until 2014.

"We embarked on a record thinking that we wanted the studio to intervene with what we came up [with]. Lots of ideas would be birthed in a year in Leeds, and we would record certain parts but we had limited equipment in Leeds so we would just consolidate at the end of every year, then in the fourth year we came up to finish it and mix it. Tom in the band mixed it."

The album was recorded largely at a farm in Edinburgh, in a converted barn building later dubbed "The Black Byre", though Burgess has also stated that parts were recorded "in our houses and all over the place"; English folk artist Eliza Carthy had used the same building that the band converted into The Black Byre as a studio previously. During the first year of recording, the band instead used the farm's cottage to record in, but have regarded that "the longterm aim was to build a studio in the barn".

The band have cited Joanna Newsom, Arthur Russell, and Van Morrison as compositional influences on the album, also calling the vocal experiments of Meredith Monk "important to think about".

== Release ==
Gist Is was released on CD and vinyl on 4 August 2014 by Adult Jazz's self-imprint label, Spare Thought. On 7 March 2025, the band announced Gist Is 10, a 10th-anniversary reissue of the album. The reissue included new artwork from the same series of pieces that the original artwork was taken from, as well as three edits by Oliver Coates, Happa, and Shabazz Palaces. Gist Is 10 was released on vinyl on 16 May 2025, via Spare Thought and Rough Trade.

== Music ==
Gist Is has been described stylistically with various different terms, with Thom Jurek of AllMusic describing it as a "sprawling meld of sophisticated indie pop, avant-rock, folk, and [...] a hint of jazz". The album makes usage of complex and progressive song structures, described as "convoluted".

== Critical reception ==
Gist Is received generally positive reviews from critics. On the review aggregator site Metacritic, it holds a score of 77 out of 100 based on a weighted average of 16 critic scores.

Professional ratings
Aggregate scores
Source	Rating
Metacritic	77/100
Review scores
Source	Rating
AllMusic	4/5 stars
Drowned in Sound	7/10 stars
The Guardian	3/5 stars
Pitchfork	7.4/10

Writing for Pitchfork, Winston Cook-Wilson notes how Adult Jazz's music recalls a "trend" of "unconventional, long-form song structures" that emerged within American indie rock in the mid-to-late 2000s, calling the songs of Gist Is "formally convoluted", but nonetheless describing the "melismatic, often beautiful melody" of Burgess' vocals on the album as a "necessary unifying element" for its complexity. In a mixed review for The Guardian, Harriet Gibsone compares the album to Dirty Projectors and Tune-Yards, citing its "ping[ing] from the sublime to the ridiculous" as being like those bands "ricocheting off the rubber walls of a padded cell"; however, singling out the songs "Hum" and "Pigeon Skulls", she notes that "the moments of melody here tend to wriggle off before the groove becomes tangible". She nonetheless calls the album "impressive - but even genius needs a little guidance".

== Track listing ==
All lyrics are written by Harry Burgess; all music is composed by Tim Slater, Harry Burgess, Steven Wells, and Tom Howe.

Gist Is track listing
No.	Title	Length
1.	"Hum"	7:32
2.	"Am Gone"	4:54
3.	"Springful"	5:12
4.	"Donne Tongue"	5:40
5.	"Pigeon Skulls"	4:58
6.	"Spook"	9:45
7.	"Idiot Mantra"	4:21
8.	"Be a Girl"	2:30
9.	"Bonedigger"	6:08
Total length:		51:05

- Some digital versions of the album include 19 seconds of silence at the end of "Bonedigger", bringing its length to 6:27 and the album's overall length to 51:24.

Gist Is 10 – bonus tracks
No.	Title	Length
10.	"Hum" (Oliver Coates edit)	6:17
11.	"Idiot Mantra" (Happa edit)	8:27
12.	"Springful" (Shabazz Palaces edit)	3:43
Total length:		69:32

== Personnel ==
Credits are adapted from Bandcamp and the album's liner notes.

Adult Jazz

- Harry Burgess – performer, additional production (5, 7, 9)
- Tom Howe – performer, producer, engineer, mixing
- Tim Slater – performer
- Steven Wells – performer

Production

- Mandy Parnell – mastering
- Kyle Molleson – additional engineer (2, 4–6)

Artwork

- Samuel J. Travis – artwork, art direction, design
