= Doomed (Moses Sumney song) =

Single by Moses Sumney

from the album Aromanticism
- Released: June 27, 2017
- Genre: Minimal
- Length: 4:23
- Label: Jagjaguwar
- Songwriters: Moses Sumney; Matthew Otto
- Producers: Moses Sumney; Matthew Otto

Moses Sumney singles chronology
"Lonely World (Lamentations Version)" (2016)	"Doomed" (2017)	"Quarrel" (2017)

Music video
- "Doomed" on YouTube

"Doomed" is a song by American singer-songwriter Moses Sumney. It was released on June 27, 2017, as the lead single from his debut studio album Aromanticism through Jagjaguwar. It is the ninth track on the album.

The song was written and produced by Sumney alongside Matthew Otto, a former member of the Canadian music group Majical Cloudz.

== Background and composition ==
In an interview with Jon Pareles of The New York Times, Sumney called "Doomed" the "thesis" of Aromanticism in explaining why he chose the song as the album's lead single.

"Doomed" is an existential reflection on mortality and love in relation to a lack of love, or aromanticism. In the chorus, Sumney ask himself: "Am I vital / If my heart is idle? / Am I doomed?" With the lyrics "If lovelessness is godlessness / Will you cast me to the wayside?", Jason King of Pitchfork described it as "foreclosing the possibility of finding lasting intimacy and love with a partner."

The track is musically minimalist, prominently featuring Sumney's "nearly-a cappella" falsetto vocals which are backed by sustained synthesizer chords. Brian Josephs of Spin wrote, "Sumney is luminous here within the percussion-less drones' warmth—his falsetto angelic, his sentiments human." Cyclone Wehner of Music Feeds called it an "existentialist operatic dirge."

== Critical reception ==
The track was met with favorable reviews. It was awarded "Best New Track" distinction by Pitchfork upon its release, with Briana Younger praising the "rawness" of Sumney's vocals as "arresting" and saying "the best qualities of his music are put into overdrive." Jon Pareles of The New York Times praised Sumney's "unearthly falsetto". Brian Josephs of Spin called the song "the album's stunner."

=== Year-end lists ===
"Doomed" was listed at #36 by Pitchfork on its "The 100 Best Songs of 2017" list. The song was included at #35 on Spin's "The 101 Best Songs of 2017" list.

== Music video ==
The accompanying music video of "Doomed" was released the same day as the track. Directed by Allie Avital, the video features Sumney floating naked in a tank of water. Near the video's end, a woman is seen separated across from Sumney in her own tank as they stare at one another. The visual pans outward from Sumney to reveal a field of tanks with naked individuals floating within each one. The visual has been compared to the pods of The Matrix films. The music video was listed at #2 on "The 5 Best Videos Of The Week" list by Stereogum, who called it "a tragically resonant visual metaphor about black American isolation."

The music video was nominated for the Independent Video of the Year award at the 2018 AIM Independent Music Awards.

== Performances ==
Sumney performed the song at St Stephen's Uniting Church in Sydney, Australia. A video of the performance was released on Sumney's YouTube channel on July 10, 2017, the same day his debut album Aromanticism was announced. The song was also performed live at "A Performance in V Acts," a five-part concert film directed by the artist and shot at The Ford in Los Angeles. Sumney was supported by the Los Angeles Philharmonic.

== Personnel ==
Credits adapted from the liner notes of Aromanticism.

- Moses Sumney – vocals, songwriting, production
- Matthew Otto – songwriting, synthesizer
- Joshua Willing Halpern – engineering
- Ben Baptie – mixing
- Ted Jensen – mastering

== In popular culture ==
"Doomed" has appeared in the soundtracks of the following television series and films:

- Season 3 Episode 9 of The Path, titled "The Veil", which aired on Hulu on February 28, 2018.
- Season 14 Episode 22 of Grey's Anatomy, titled "Fight For Your Mind", which aired on ABC on May 3, 2018.
- Season 6 Episode 13 of Orange Is the New Black, titled "Be Free", which aired on Netflix on July 27, 2018.
- Season 3 Episode 3 of Westworld, titled "The Absence of Field", which aired on HBO on March 29, 2020. An instrumental cover composed by Ramin Djawadi is also played in the final scene of the episode.
- Season 3 Episode 7 of Ted Lasso, titled "The Strings That Bind Us", which aired on Apple TV+ on April 26, 2023.
- Melina Matsoukas' 2019 film Queen & Slim.
- Mattson Tomlin's 2021 film Mother/Android.
