= Earrings Off! =

Studio album by Adult Jazz
- Released: 20 May 2016
- Studio: The Nest (London)
- Genre: Avant-pop
- Length: 24:54
- Label: Tri Angle
- Producer: Tom Howe

Adult Jazz chronology
| Gist Is (2014) | Earrings Off! (2016) | So Sorry So Slow (2024) |

Earrings Off! is a mini-album by English four-piece band Adult Jazz. It was released on 20 May 2016 through Tri Angle. It received generally favorable reviews from critics.

== Background ==
Adult Jazz is an English four-piece band based in Leeds, consisting of Harry Burgess, Tom Howe, Tim Slater, and Steven Wells. Earrings Off! is a follow-up to the band's debut studio album, Gist Is (2014). Music videos were released for the songs "Eggshell", "Earrings Off!", and "Pumped from Above". Jenny Hval's remix of the song "Earrings Off!" was later released in 2016, after the album's release.

== Critical reception ==
Professional ratings
Aggregate scores
| Source | Rating |
|---|---|
| Metacritic | 68/100 |
Review scores
| Source | Rating |
| AllMusic | 3.5/5 stars |
| Consequence | B− |
| Exclaim! | 8/10 |
| The Guardian | 3/5 stars |
| Pitchfork | 6.0/10 |
| PopMatters | 7/10 stars |

According to the review aggregator Metacritic, Earrings Off! received "generally favorable reviews" based on a weighted average score of 68 out of 100 from 8 critic scores.

Ashley Hampson of Exclaim! wrote, "Consisting of four full tracks and three shorter movements, the album easily moves between experimental arrangements, meaningful lyricism and distressed interludes." Sean Barry of Consequence commented that "Even with misgivings about the lack of length and focus, this mini-LP makes fairly clear that Adult Jazz are in a transitional state." Marcy Donelson of AllMusic stated, "Like their debut, Earrings Off! is made up of uncompromising stuff that may take some adjusting to, but willing ears will find articulate, distinctive musicality that rewards repeat listens." Kevin Lozano of Pitchfork commented that "They've learned how to create hooks without sacrificing from their outré sounds."

== Track listing ==
All lyrics are written by Harry Burgess; all music is composed by Harry Burgess, Tom Howe, Tim Slater, and Steven Wells.

Earrings Off! track listing
| No. | Title | Length |
|---|---|---|
| 1. | "Earrings Off!" | 4:36 |
| 2. | "(Cry for Time Off)" | 1:02 |
| 3. | "Eggshell" | 4:56 |
| 4. | "(Cry for Coherence)" | 1:22 |
| 5. | "Pumped from Above" | 6:14 |
| 6. | "Ooh Ah Eh" | 4:51 |
| 7. | "(Cry for Home)" | 1:53 |
| Total length: | | 24:54 |

== Personnel ==
Credits adapted from liner notes.

- Harry Burgess – music
- Tom Howe – music, production
- Tim Slater – music
- Steven Wells – music
- Samuel Travis – cello (6), art direction, design
- Ben Baptie – mixing
- Mandy Parnell – mastering
