= Blanc Magazine =

American magazine

Blanc Magazine is an independently published magazine founded in 2011 covering fashion, art, and music.

== History ==
The magazine was created by Teneshia Carr who, as a Black-American, felt the need to create a more inclusive cultural magazine:

“Being told that I can’t use a trans model; they already have a Black girl photo shoot in their issue so they don’t want me to use a Black girl, it just fueled my need to figure out how to create a space where those conversations are ridiculous and they don’t exist,[...] so I started researching and connecting with stylists and photographers and makeup artists and model bookers who felt the same way I did.”

— Teneshia Carr

2,500 prints of the first issue were distributed in London's libraries through a deal with Comag.

The first years running the magazine, Carr's lack of network and her 'Afro' looks made it hard to connect and work with luxury brands. In 2018, she confronted Gucci about a clothing that resembled a blackface, and started a collaboration with the brand. In 2018, it also made its first music cover with Rosalía Vila Tobella.

In 2022, Kevin Martinez, former publisher of Elle, Details and Maxim, was recruited to contribute to Blanc Magazine.

== Description ==
Blanc Magazine is owned and edited by Teneshia Carr, a fashion photographer and writer at Inc.com, with headquarters in New York.

The magazine is available on line and has 4 yearly print issues. In 2023, Blanc Magazine was a 100,000 prints-per-issue magazine distributed in 25 countries. The design agency Blanc Space provides brand content services.
