= Are You Alone? =

Studio album by Majical Cloudz
- Released: October 16, 2015
- Genres: Indie pop; art pop; electronic; synthpop; ambient; dream pop
- Length: 43:32
- Label: Matador

Majical Cloudz chronology
Impersonator (2013)	Are You Alone? (2015)	Wait & See (2016)

Singles from Are You Alone?
- 1. "Silver Car Crash" Released: August 12, 2015; 2. "Are You Alone?" Released: September 21, 2015; 3. "Downtown" Released: October 7, 2015

Are You Alone? is the fourth and final studio album from Canadian pop duo Majical Cloudz, released on October 16, 2015, on Matador Records.

The album was nominated for a Juno Award in 2016.

== Critical reception ==
Professional ratings
Aggregate scores
Source	Rating
AnyDecentMusic?	7.7/10
Metacritic	80/100
Review scores
Source	Rating
AllMusic	4.5/5 stars
Consequence of Sound	B+
Exclaim!	8/10
The Guardian	4/5 stars
The Irish Times	4/5 stars
Mojo	4/5 stars
Pitchfork	8.0/10
Rolling Stone	3.5/5 stars
Spin	8/10
Uncut	5/10

Are You Alone? received largely positive reviews from contemporary music critics. At Metacritic, which assigns a normalized rating out of 100 to reviews from mainstream critics, the album received an average score of 80, based on 18 reviews, which indicates "generally favorable reviews".

Mike Powell of Pitchfork gave the album a positive review, stating, "Like Impersonator, Alone is a sad album, but its sadness is a kind of tall tale, the details of which are overblown for dramatic effect. At times its lyrics sound less like expressions of personal darkness than advertisements for darkness in general, written in lettering so big you could read it from the highway." Powell continues, "Alone is less stripped-down than Impersonator, but it feels less confrontational, too. The band recently went on tour opening for Lorde, and seem to have figured out how to broaden their sound while softening it at the same time, all without losing the detonating high that made Impersonator so remarkable. Songs like "So Blue" and "Downtown"—both standouts—are easy to imagine as more fully fleshed out pieces of music, conveying size without occupying space. Like photographic negatives, you can still see the image but the inversion of blacks and whites lends it a kind of alien melancholy."

Ben Kopel of Flood Magazine wrote of the album: "With this, their sophomore LP about the shaky realities surrounding real love, the co-conspirators have delivered one of 2015’s most honest and moving albums. Lyrically, Welsh explores the doubts and fears that crawl in anytime we open our hearts and lives to anyone—be they family, friend, or partner—with a vulnerability that’s completely comfortable with sounding courageous and unsure in the same baritone breath."

=== Accolades ===
Publication	Accolade	Year	Rank
Consequence of Sound	Top 50 Albums of 2015	2015	47
Paste	The 50 Best Albums of 2015	2015	43
PopMatters	The 80 Best Albums of 2015	2015	43
Spin	The 50 Best Albums of 2015	2015	48

== Track listing ==
All tracks are written by Devon Welsh.

No.	Title	Length
1.	"Disappeared"	3:45
2.	"Control"	3:21
3.	"Are You Alone?"	3:50
4.	"So Blue"	3:49
5.	"Heavy"	3:29
6.	"Silver Car Crash"	3:30
7.	"Change"	4:06
8.	"If You're Lonely"	3:40
9.	"Downtown"	4:09
10.	"Easier Said than Done"	2:47
11.	"Game Show"	3:19
12.	"Call On Me"	3:47
Total length:		43:32

== Personnel ==
Main personnel

- Devon Welsh – composer
- Matthew Otto – composer, mixing
- Fady Hanna - keyboards, synths
- Owen Pallett – cello, drums, violin (4)
- Austin Milne – saxophone (1)
- Kenneth Welsh – flute (5, 7)

Additional personnel

- Tyler Crawford – mixing
- Tyler Fitzmaurice – mixing
- Ryan Morey – mastering
