= Moses Sumney =

American singer-songwriter (born 1992)

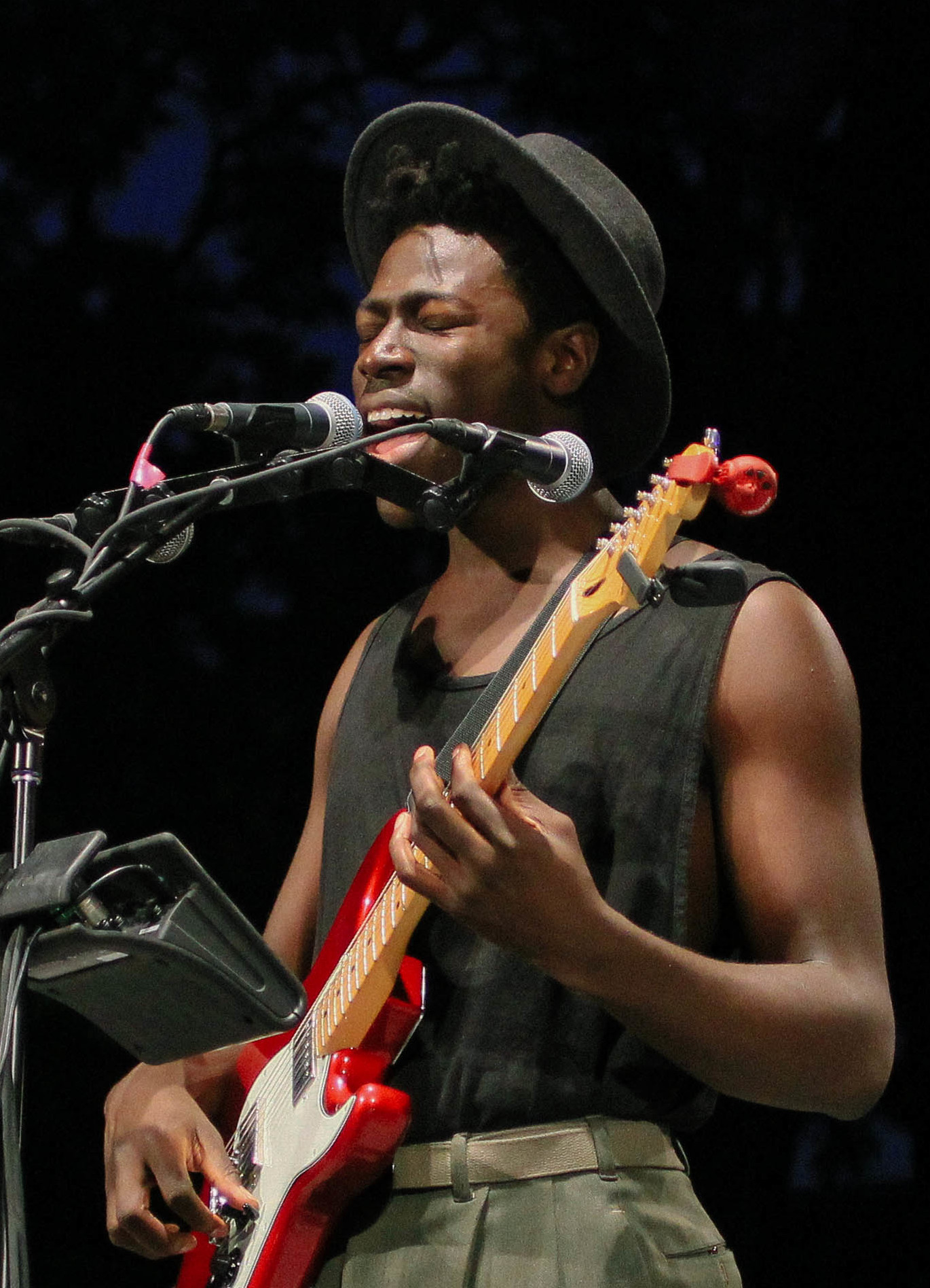
- Sumney performing in 2014

Background information
- Born: May 19, 1992 (age 34)
- Genres: Indie rock; electro-soul; folk; art rock; baroque pop
- Occupations: Singer, songwriter, musician, actor
- Instruments: Vocals, guitar, piano
- Labels: Terrible; Jagjaguwar; Tuntum
- Website: www.mosessumney.com

Moses Sumney (born May 19, 1992) is an American singer-songwriter and actor. His self-recorded EP, Mid-City Island, was released in 2014. He released another five-song EP in 2016, titled Lamentations. His first full-length album, Aromanticism, was released in September 2017. His second studio album, Græ, was released in 2020. Sumney has performed as an opening act for James Blake, Solange Knowles, and Sufjan Stevens. In 2023, he was featured on The Weeknd's HBO TV series The Idol.

== Early life ==
Born in California, Sumney was raised by pastor parents, and moved with his family back to Ghana at the age of 10. He described his childhood as "Americanized" by this age and had difficulty adjusting to the culture of Ghana, especially the rural nature of his new environment. There he grew up on a goat farm in Accra and commuted by public bus to school. His family returned to Southern California when Sumney was 16, settling in Riverside.

He did not learn to play any instruments until he was older, writing a cappella music for years instead. Sumney did not perform his musical compositions publicly until he was 20.

After high school, he moved to Los Angeles in 2010 to attend the University of California, Los Angeles. He majored in creative writing and studied poetry, which helped him improve his songwriting.

== Musical career ==
In 2014, Sumney broke into the Los Angeles music scene and caught the eye of many record labels. He said at the time it did not feel right because labels were trying to conform him into a certain image and he was still trying to discover the artist that he wanted to be. He decided to turn down these labels and move to Asheville, North Carolina. His resistance to labels is reflected in his later album, Græ.

Sumney's 2014 debut project, Mid-City Island, is a five-song EP that was self-recorded onto a four-track recorder given to him by Dave Sitek of TV on the Radio. The self-released EP was described by Pitchfork as "primarily composed of first-takes and improvisation; the music is stirring but purposefully incomplete". Sumney joined Terrible Records after the release. He considers his songs to be performance based, and that many of his recorded compositions derive from fleshing the songs out through live performance.

He has performed at venues such as the Hollywood Bowl and alongside artists such as Dirty Projectors, Junip, St. Vincent, and Local Natives. Sumney sang on the opening track of Beck's album Song Reader. On September 30, 2016, Sumney released Lamentations, an EP which featured a guest appearance from Thundercat.

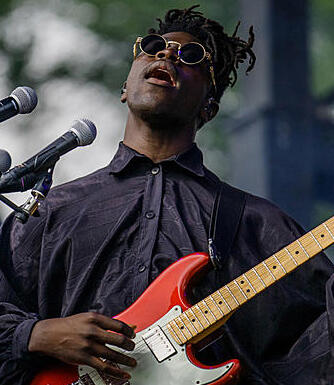
Sumney performing in 2018

Sumney's first full-length album, Aromanticism, was released on September 22, 2017 by Jagjaguwar. It received acclaim from Rolling Stone, The Guardian, and The New York Times, which also named it one of the best albums of 2017. He stumbled across the term "aromantic" when he began writing it back in 2014 and found the term resonated with him. Several songs from the album have been featured in the soundtracks of various television shows. His 2017 single "Doomed" appeared in the Season 6 finale of Netflix's Orange is the New Black, and appeared again in Westworld, Season 3, Episode 3, "The Absence of Field". His 2017 single "Quarrel" appeared in Netflix’s Dear White People. His 2017 song "Plastic" and his 2020 song "Keeps Me Alive" both appeared in HBO's Insecure. The songs "Quarrel", "Doomed", and "Swan Song" all appeared in the 2021 film Swan Song.

Sumney played himself in Season 1 episode 4 of HBO's Random Acts of Flyness. He also appeared in the movie Creed and worked on the soundtrack alongside Ludwig Görannson and Tessa Thompson.

Sumney released his second studio album, Græ, in two parts in 2020. The first part was released on February 21, 2020, and the second part was released on May 15, 2020, accompanied by a physical release of the double album. In March 2020, he released the self-directed music video "Cut Me". In May 2020, Sumney released "Bless Me" as a single from the second part of his album, Græ.

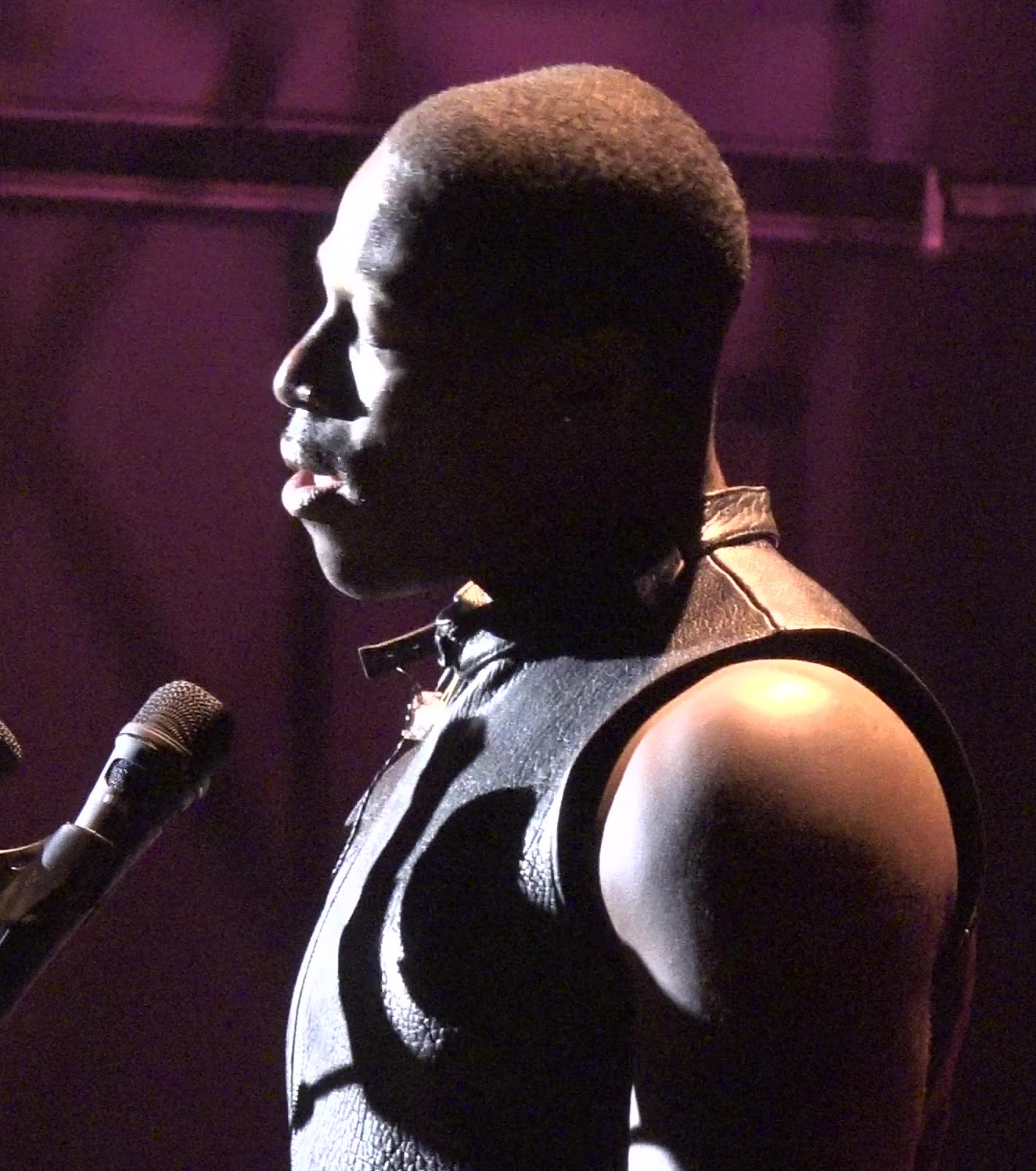
Sumney performing at The Performance Space in NYC, 2026

In December 2020, Sumney's single "Me in 20 Years" was featured in a special episode of the HBO drama Euphoria. Sumney contributed a cover of the Metallica song "The Unforgiven" to the charity tribute album The Metallica Blacklist, released in September 2021. On December 8, 2021, Sumney released a full-length concert film, Blackalachia, recorded over two days in the Blue Ridge Mountains. An accompanying live album, Live from Blackalachia, was released on December 10.

In 2025, Sumney appeared as the clown and musician Feste in a Shakespeare In The Park production of Twelfth Night; or What You Will.

== Awards and honors ==
In 2018, Moses Sumney's self-directed music video "Quarrel" won a SXSW Film Festival Special Jury Award, and was nominated for a Camerimage award and UKMVA. In 2020, his self-directed video for "Cut Me" was nominated for a UKMVA for Best Alternative Video - International. Both of his albums have featured on the year-end lists of Pitchfork, NPR, New York Times, Stereogum, and more.

== Discography ==
Moses Sumney discography
- Studio albums: 2
- EPs: 5
- Live albums: 1
- Singles: 18

=== Studio albums ===
List of studio albums, with selected information
Title	Details	Peak chart positions			
Title	Details	US Sales	US Heat	BEL (FL)	POR
Aromanticism	Released: September 22, 2017; Label: Jagjaguwar; Format: CD, LP, digital download, streaming	—	—	139	—
Græ	Released: May 15, 2020; Label: Jagjaguwar; Formats: CD, LP, digital download, streaming	28	8	—	44

=== Live albums ===
List of live albums, with selected information
Title	Details
Live from Blackalachia	Released: December 10, 2021; Label: Jagjaguwar, Tuntum; Format: CD, LP, digital download, streaming

=== Extended plays ===
List of extended plays, with selected information
Title	Details
Mid-City Island	Released: April 7, 2014; Label: Self-released; Format: Cassette, CD-R, digital download, streaming
Lamentations	Released: September 30, 2016; Label: Jagjaguwar; Format: CD, vinyl, digital download, streaming
Make Out in My Car: Chameleon Suite	Released: May 25, 2018; Label: Jagjaguwar; Format: Digital download, streaming
Black in Deep Red, 2014	Released: August 10, 2018; Label: Jagjaguwar; Format: Vinyl, digital download, streaming
Bryce Dessner: Tenebre (with Ensemble Resonanz)	Released: September 20, 2019; Label: Resonanzraum; Format: Vinyl, digital download, streaming
Sophcore	Released: August 2, 2024; Label: Tuntum; Format: Digital download, streaming

=== Singles ===
==== As lead artist ====
Title	Year	Album
"Man on the Moon"	2014	Mid-City Island
"Scratch the Surface" / "Forlorn Fantasy"	2014	Non-album singles
"Seeds" / "Pleas"	2015	Non-album singles
"Everlasting Sigh"	2016	Non-album singles
"Worth It"	2016	Lamentations
"Lonely World (Lamentations Version)"	2016	Lamentations
"Doomed"	2017	Aromanticism
"Quarrel"	2017	Aromanticism
"Indulge Me"	2017	Aromanticism
"Rank & File"	2018	Black in Deep Red
"Virile"	2019	Græ
"Polly"	2019	Græ
"Me in 20 Years"	2020	Græ
"Cut Me"	2020	Græ
"Bless Me"	2020	Græ
"The Other Lover" (with Little Dragon)	2020	Non-album singles
"The Unforgiven"	2021	The Metallica Blacklist
"Can't Believe It" (with Sam Gendel)	2021	Non-album singles
"Get It B4"	2023	The Idol Episode 3 (Music from the HBO Original Series)
"Vintage"	2024	Sophcore
"Gold Coast"	2024	Sophcore
"Hey Girl(s)" (with Syd & Meshell Ndegeocello)	2025	Sophcore
"I Like It I Like It" (with Hayley Williams)	2025	TBA
"O Mistress Mine"	2025	What You Will: Music from Free Shakespeare in the Park's Twelfth Night

==== As featured artist ====
Title	Year	Album
"Show Me Love" (Skrillex remix) (Hundred Waters featuring Chance the Rapper, Moses Sumney, and Robin Hannibal)	2016	Non-album single
"To Believe" (The Cinematic Orchestra featuring Moses Sumney)	2019	To Believe
"Cul de Sac" (Trayer Tryon, Jónsi, and Alex Somers featuring Moses Sumney, Nicole Miglis, and Julianna Barwick)	2020	Non-album single
"Find Me" (Dahi featuring Mez and Moses Sumney)	2026	Black Boy (Alternative)

==== Other charted songs ====
Title	Details	Peak chart positions	Album
Title	Details	US Dance	Album
"Tell Them" (James Blake featuring Metro Boomin and Moses Sumney)	2019	23	Assume Form

=== Guest appearances ===
List of guest appearances as featured artist, with the respective artists and albums
Title	Year	Artist	Album
"Title of This Song"	2014	Beck	Beck Song Reader
"Shed You"	2015	Tessa Thompson	Creed: Original Motion Picture Soundtrack
"Show Me Love"	2016	Hundred Waters, Chance the Rapper, Robin Hannibal, Skrillex	Non-album single
"Mad"	2016	Solange Knowles, Lil' Wayne	A Seat at the Table
"Cassidy"	2016	Jenny Lewis & Friends	Day of the Dead
"Truth Lies Low"	2016	Andrew Bird	Are You Serious
"Weekend"	2017	Flume	Skin Companion EP 2
"Tell Them"	2019	James Blake, Metro Boomin	Assume Form
"U (Man Like)"	2019	Bon Iver, Bruce Hornsby, Jenn Wasner	i,i
"To Believe"	2019	The Cinematic Orchestra	To Believe
"Standing on the Horizon"	2019	Woodkid	Woodkid for Nicolas Ghesquière - Louis Vuitton Works One
"Tenebre"	2019	Bryce Dessner, Ensemble Resonanz	Bryce Dessner: Tenebre
"Blood in Rain"	2020	Ethan Gruska	En Garde
"The Unforgiven"	2021	Metallica	The Metallica Blacklist
"I'll Be Seeing You"	2023	—N/a	A Small Light (Songs from the Limited Series)
"Insecurities"	2024	Shabaka	Perceive Its Beauty, Acknowledge Its Grace
"Around the World in a Day"	2024	RM	Right Place, Wrong Person
"Is It Cold in the Water?"	2024	Anohni	Transa
"You Make Me Feel (Mighty Real)"	2024	Lyra Pramuk, Sam Smith	Transa

== Filmography ==
Year	Title	Role	Notes	Ref.
2023	The Idol	Izaak	Supporting role	
2024	MaXXXine	Leon Green	Supporting role	
2026	Interview with the Vampire	Lemuel	Guest appearance	

== Awards and nominations ==
Year	Association	Category	Nominated work	Result	Ref
2018	AIM Independent Music Awards	Independent Video of the Year	"Doomed"	Nominated	
2018	AIM Independent Music Awards	International Breakthrough of the year	Moses Sumney	Nominated	
2018	Libera Awards	Best Outlier Record	Aromanticism	Won	
2019	Libera Awards	Video of the Year	“Quarrel”	Nominated	
2020	AIM Awards	Best Second Album	Græ	Nominated	
2021	AIM Awards	Best Independent Album	Græ	Nominated	
2021	Libera Award	Best Outlier Record	Græ	Nominated	
