= Majical Cloudz =

Canadian electronic music group

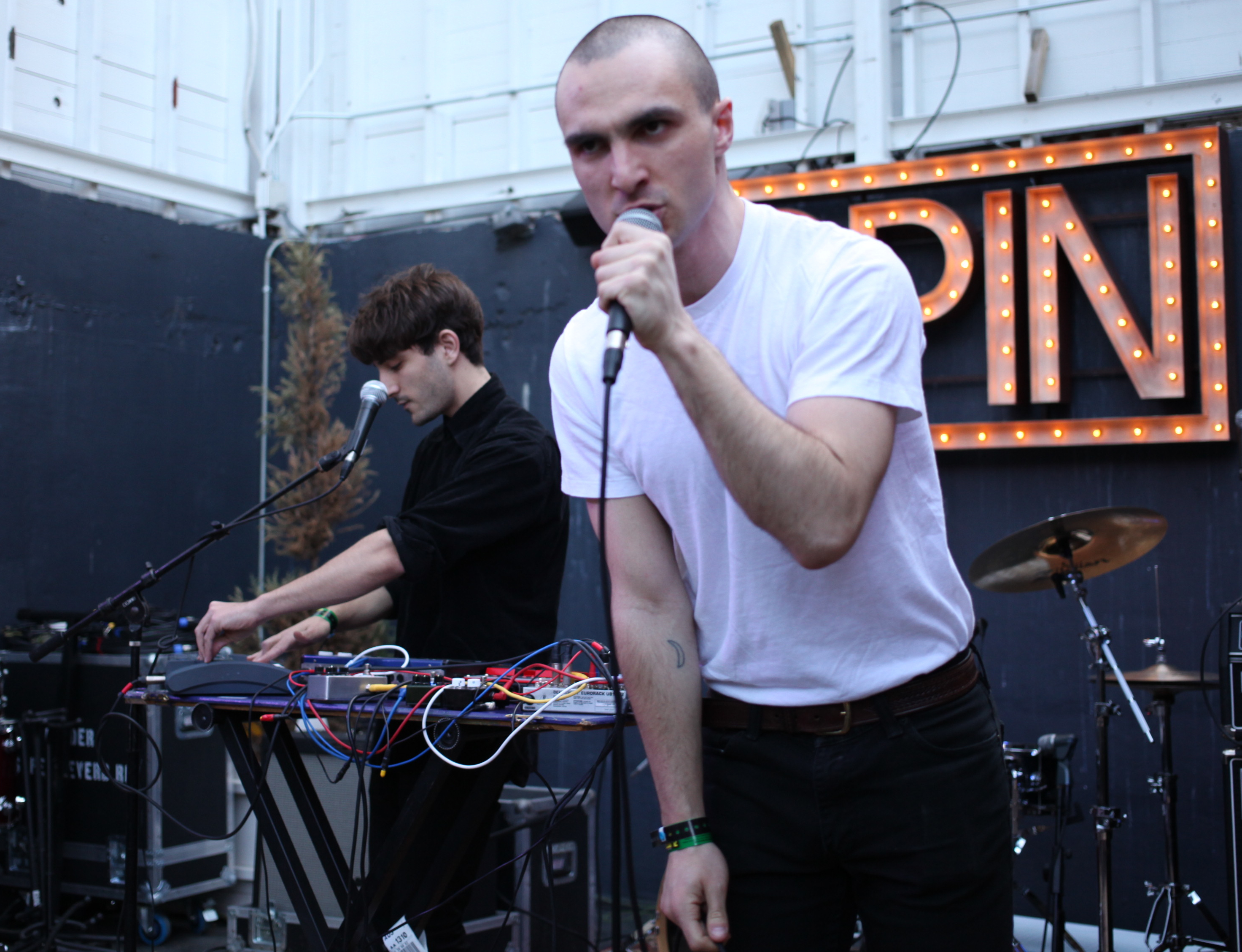
- Majical Cloudz performing at SXSW in 2013

Background information
- Origin: Halifax, NS, Canada Montreal, QC, Canada
- Genres: Art pop; electropop; indie pop
- Years active: 2010–2016
- Labels: Arbutus; Matador; Arts & Crafts
- Past members: Devon Welsh; Matt Otto; Matt E. Duffy

Majical Cloudz was a Canadian electronic music project formed in Halifax, Nova Scotia, in 2010 by Devon Welsh and Matthew E. Duffy. The name originated from a series of experimental noise performances organized by the pair in Halifax beginning in 2008. Initially rooted in experimental electronic and ambient music, the project later evolved into a minimalist synth-pop group after Welsh began collaborating with producer Matt Otto following Duffy's departure in 2011.

After relocating to Montreal, Majical Cloudz became associated with the city's Arbutus Records scene and gained international recognition for the albums Impersonator (2013) and Are You Alone? (2015).

== History ==
Welsh, the son of actor Kenneth Welsh and Corinne Farago, began Majical Cloudz as a collaborative open project in Halifax, Nova Scotia, in 2010. Welsh first collaborated with friend Matthew E. Duffy, releasing a self-titled cassette on Numbers Station, followed by an EP, Earth to a Friend/Mountain Eyes. They released their debut full-length album II in 2011. Duffy left the group shortly after in 2011. Otto, an electronic musician with a penchant for abstract soundscapes, joined in 2012, appearing for the first time on the EP Turns, Turns, Turns.

Their second album, Impersonator, was released May 21, 2013, on Matador Records, and was a longlisted nominee for the 2013 Polaris Music Prize. The band toured extensively throughout North America and Europe to support the album, including performances at Toronto's NXNE festival and New York City's Northside Festival. Pitchfork ranked Impersonator as their eighth best album of 2013. In 2014, the group toured with Lorde on the North American leg of her tour.

The band's third album, Are You Alone?, was released on October 16, 2015, to critical acclaim. The album was nominated for a Juno Award. In January 2016, the band released an EP, called Wait And See. The group again collaborated with Owen Pallett, who also appeared on Are You Alone?

In an episode called "Paradise" of the streaming series The OA (season 1, episode 5), which originally aired December 16, 2016, the Majical Cloudz song "Downtown" was featured.

On March 4, 2016, Welsh announced on social media that he and Otto were going their separate ways, and that Are You Alone? would be their last full release. Both Welsh and Otto have gone on to pursue other projects.

== Discography ==
=== Studio albums ===
- Majical Cloudz (2010)
- II (2011)
- Impersonator (2013)
- Are You Alone? (2015)

=== EPs ===
- Earth to a Friend/Mountain Eyes (2011)
- Turns Turns Turns (2012)
- Wait & See (2016)

=== Singles ===
- Childhood's End (2013)
- Tour Journals (2014)
