= Free Flight =

Free Flight or freeflight can refer to:

Flight

- Free flight (air traffic control)
- Free flight (model aircraft)

Music

- Free Flight (band), an American jazz band led by Jim Walker
- Freeflight (album)

== See also ==
- Free fall (disambiguation)
