= Resilience =

Resilience, resilient, or resiliency may refer to:

== Science ==
=== Ecology ===
- Ecological resilience, the capacity of an ecosystem to recover from perturbations
  - Climate resilience, the ability of systems to recover from climate change
  - Soil resilience, the ability of a soil to maintain a healthy state in response to destabilising influences

=== Social sciences ===
- Democratic resilience, the capacity of a country to withstand autocratization or restore democracy
- Resilience in art, the property of artwork to remain relevant over changing times
- Resilience (organizational), the ability of a system to withstand changes in its environment and still function
- Psychological resilience, an individual's ability to adapt in the face of adverse conditions
- Supply chain resilience, the capacity of a supply chain to persist, adapt, or transform in the face of change
- Urban resilience, the adaptive capacities of complex urban systems to manage change, order and disorder over time
- Community resilience, the adaptive capacities of communities and societies to manage change and adversities over time

== Technology and engineering ==
- Resilience engineering, a research field seeking to understand how complex adaptive systems cope when encountering a surprise
- Resilience (engineering and construction), the ability of buildings and infrastructure to absorb assaults without suffering complete failure
- Resilience (power system)
- Resilience (materials science), the ability of a material to absorb energy when deformed, and release that energy upon unloading
- Resilience (network), the ability of a computer network to maintain service in the face of faults
- Cyber resilience, in information security
- Resilient control systems, the engendering of cognitive, cyber-physical threat resilience into control systems
- a concept in energy development
- Resilience, the micro-rover carried by the Japanese Hakuto-R Mission 2 to land on Earth's moon

== Entertainment and media ==
=== Cinema ===
- Resilience (film) (2006)
- Resilience (play) (2009)
- Resilience (sculpture), a sculpture in Brisbane, Queensland, Australia

=== Literature ===
- Resilience (Greitens book), "Resilience: Hard-Won Wisdom for Living a Better Life", a 2015 book by Eric Greitens
- Resilience (2018), seventh book in Fletcher DeLancey's Chronicles of Alsea series
- Resilience: Two Sisters and a Story of Mental Illness, a memoir by Jessie Close with Pete Earley
- Resilience: Reflections on the Burdens and Gifts of Facing Life's Adversities, a 2009 book by Elizabeth Edwards
- Resilient (book), 2016 autobiography by Australian cricketer Mitchell Johnson

=== Music ===
==== Songs ====
- "Resilience" (2008), by Annabelle Chvostek, off the eponymous album Resilience (Annabelle Chvostek album)
- "Resilience" (2012), by As I Lay Dying, off the album Awakened
- "Resilience" (2015), by Born of Osiris, off the album Soul Sphere
- "Resilient" (2013), by Running Wild, off the eponymous album Resilient
- "Resilient" (2020), by Katy Perry, off the album Smile (Katy Perry album)

==== Albums ====
- Resilient (Dope Saint Jude album) (2018)
- Resilient (Running Wild album) (2013)
- The Resilient (2017), album by Betraying the Martyrs
- Resilience (Annabelle Chvostek album) (2008)
- Resilience (Drowning Pool album) (2013)
- Resilience (Kid606 album) (2005)

== Other uses ==
- Crew Dragon Resilience, a SpaceX Dragon 2 space capsule, C207, first used for the second crewed Dragon flight, NASA SpaceX Crew-1, first full-up crew mission to the ISS on the platform
- Resilience NSW, a government agency of the New South Wales government in Australia
- Resilience.org, a pro-environment website owned by the think tank Post Carbon Institute
- UK Resilience, a government agency of the United Kingdom

== See also ==
- The Resilience Project, a project to identify protective factors against disease
- Resilience Alliance, a network that analyzes social interactions
