= Akoma =

Studio album by Jlin
- Released: March 22, 2024
- Length: 43:31
- Label: Planet Mu
- Producer: Jlin

Jlin chronology
Perspective (2023)	Akoma (2024)

Singles from Akoma
- 1. "The Precision of Infinity" Released: January 18, 2024; 2. "Auset" Released: February 8, 2024; 3. "Summon" Released: March 6, 2024

Akoma is the third album by American producer Jlin. It was released on March 22, 2024, through Planet Mu, as her first studio album in seven years, following Black Origami (2017).

== Background ==
Following years of collaborative projects with the likes of Holly Herndon, Sophie and Kronos Quartet, Akoma sees the producer return to her signature blend of various genres, including jazz, classic and minimalist music into one "160 BPM rhythmic framework" of "Chicago footwork". On January 18, 2024, Patton announced the album and revealed collaborations with Björk, Kronos Quartet, and Philip Glass. In creating the record, she drew inspiration from Glass, Eartha Kitt, Nina Simone, Third Coast Percussion, and HBCU marching bands. In a statement, Patton thanked each of them for their "brilliance" that "shines through every sound" on the album. To promote the album, Patton will perform at several festivals in April 2024.

== Critical reception ==
Professional ratings
Aggregate scores
Source	Rating
Metacritic	84/100
Review scores
Source	Rating
AllMusic	4/5 stars
Exclaim!	9/10
Paste	7.9/10
Pitchfork	8.0/10
PopMatters	8/10
The Skinny	4/5 stars

According to the review aggregator Metacritic, Akoma received "universal acclaim" based on a weighted average score of 84 out of 100 from 10 critic scores.

=== Year-end lists ===
Select year-end rankings for Akoma
Publication/critic	Accolade	Rank	Ref.
Bleep	Top 10 Albums of 2024	5	
Uncut	80 Best Albums of 2024	57	

== Track listing ==
All tracks are written by Jlin; "Borealis" written with Björk, "Sodalite" and "The Precision of Infinity" written with Philip Glass.

Akoma track listing
No.	Title	Length
1.	"Borealis" (featuring Björk)	4:06
2.	"Speed of Darkness"	5:17
3.	"Summon"	4:11
4.	"Iris"	3:43
5.	"Open Canvas"	4:57
6.	"Challenge (To Be Continued II)"	2:04
7.	"Eye Am"	3:29
8.	"Auset"	3:43
9.	"Sodalite" (featuring Kronos Quartet)	3:50
10.	"Grannie's Cherry Pie"	3:31
11.	"The Precision of Infinity" (featuring Philip Glass)	4:40
Total length:		43:31

== Personnel ==
- Jlin – production
- Beau Thomas – mastering
- Florence To – art direction, sculpture, design

== Charts ==
Chart performance for Akoma
Chart (2024)	Peak position
UK Album Downloads (Official Charts)	36
UK Independent Albums (Official Charts)	48
