= Self-repair =

Self-repair may refer to:

- Self-repair mechanisms of DNA
- Self-healing materials
- maintenance, repair, and operations or do it yourself
- Self-repair is a linguistic action studied in Conversation analysis

== See also ==
- Self-healing
- Self-healing (computer science)
- Self-healing material
- Self-organization (self-organizing systems are capable of self-repair)
- Resilience (disambiguation)
