= Umbriel (disambiguation) =

Umbriel is a moon of Uranus.

Umbriel may also refer to:

- Mount Umbriel, a mountain on Alexander Island, Antarctica
- Umbriel (Futurama), a fictional character in Futurama
- Umbriel, a fictional character in The Rape of the Lock by Alexander Pope
- Umbriel, a fictional location in The Infernal City by Greg Keyes

== See also ==
- Embryo (disambiguation)
- Umbra (disambiguation)
