= Dope Saint Jude =

South African rapper

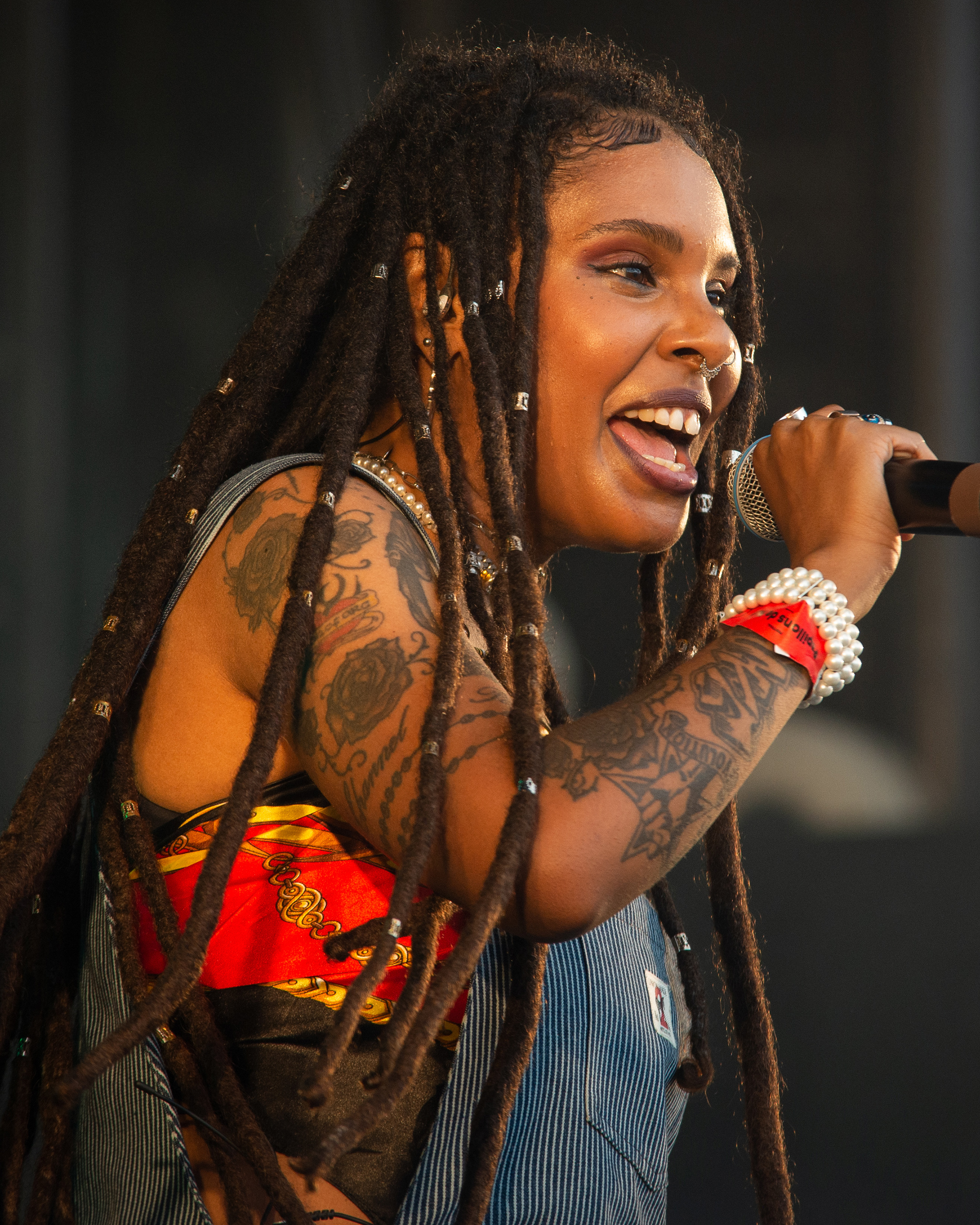
- Dope Saint Jude in 2022.

Background information
- Born: Catherine Saint Jude Pretorius; April 11, 1990 (age 36); Cape Town, South Africa
- Origin: South Africa
- Genres: Hip Hop, RnB
- Occupations: Rapper; singer; songwriter; music producer
- Instruments: Vocals, keyboard
- Years active: 2017–present
- Website: www.dopesaintjude.com

Catherine Saint Jude Pretorius, professionally known as Dope Saint Jude, is a South African rapper, singer, songwriter and music producer.

== Early life ==
Dope Saint Jude was born in and grew up in Elsies River, a working-class colored neighborhood located on Cape Town's flats in South Africa. She taught herself to play the guitar at the age of 12 and began writing poetry to accompany her music. She later went into her own brand of hip hop, which has been described as a soundtrack for feminist inclusivity, acceptance and empowerment. She has been noted for bringing a "queer" edge to the hip hop scene.

== Career ==
She began her career in 2011, performing as Saint Dude, a drag king. At that time, she started South Africa's first documented drag king troupe. In 2013, Saint Jude left the troupe to pursue a career as a solo performer.

She released the vogue song and accompanying music video "Keep In Touch" featuring Angel-Ho in 2015. In an interview she stated that she produced the song in 2014 using an Eminem sample kit.

In 2016, she collaborated with M.I.A. to be part of H&M’s awareness-raising campaign video for world recycle week. In July 2016, Saint Jude released her self-produced debut EP, Reimagine. In 2017, she was featured on the Jlin album, Black Origami.

She has performed at the Cape Town International Jazz Festival in 2017, Stanford University in 2017 and Afropunk Festival Johannesburg in 2018.

In November 2018, she released her second EP, Resilient. The lead single, "Grrrl Like" was released in October 2018. The song been used for the Apple TV show Dickinson, the anime Netflix show Kipo and the Age of Wonderbeasts, car manufacturer's advert, in the trailer of Netflix’s South African original series, Blood & Water, and in the movie Nimona adapted from the graphic novel of the same name.

In April 2022, she released her third EP, Higher Self.

== Artistry ==
Much of Dope Saint Jude's music has tackled issues of social justice, specifically LGBTQ and women's rights. As a queer woman of color, Dope Saint Jude channels her personal experience into her work. By highlighting her identity through her work, Pretorius is able to bring attention to underrepresented issues and demographics in South African society.

In her music videos such as "Grrrl Like", "Keep In Touch", and "Alphas", Dope Saint Jude features elements of South African queer culture through the gender nonconforming wardrobe choices and of her background dancers as well as her use of Gayle. Pretorius' inclusion of translative subtitles for the Gayle dialogue in her video "Keep In Touch" allows the queer culture that she is shedding light on to be more accessible to a general audience.

In her song “Brown Baas,” Pretorius addresses the racism in post apartheid South Africa. With lines like “I’m representing the voiceless and don’t you ever forget it / I’ve got power and passion and I don’t need to defend it”, “they keep us in chains while they keep on building their towers” and, “do you know what it’s like to be brown for a girl like me?” she presents herself as a spokesperson for the contemporary racial issues existing in South Africa.

== Discography ==
- Reimagine (2016)
- Resilient (2018)
- Higher Self (2022)
- I Said What I Said (2026)
