= Free fall (disambiguation) =

Free fall is any motion of a body when gravity is the only force acting upon it.

Free fall, Free-fall, or Freefall may also refer to:

== Books ==
- Freefall, a character in the Gen^{13} comic book
- Freefall (G.I. Joe), a fictional character in the G.I. Joe universe
- Free Fall (Golding novel), a 1959 novel by William G. Golding
- Freefall (novel), the third book of the Tunnels series, by Roderick Gordon and Brian Williams
- Freefall: America, Free Markets, and the Sinking of the World Economy, a 2010 non-fiction book by Joseph Stiglitz
- Freefall, an autobiographical work of non-fiction by Charles "Nish" Bruce under the pseudonym Tom Read
- Free Fall, a crime novel in the Elvis Cole series, by Robert Crais
- Free Fall: A Sniper's Story from Chechnya, a novel by Nicolai Lilin
- Free Fall, a novel by Kyle Mills
- Freefall, a science fiction novel by Judith and Garfield Reeves-Stevens

== Film and TV ==
=== Films ===
- Freefall (1994 film), 1994 film directed by John Irvin
- Free Fall (1999 film), 1999 film written by Ken Wheat
- Freefall (2009 film), 2009 BBC television film written and directed by Dominic Savage
- Free Fall (2009 film), a Canadian drama film directed by Mariloup Wolfe
- Free Fall (2013 film), English title of the 2013 German film Freier Fall
- Free Fall (2014 American film), an American crime thriller film
- Free Fall (2014 Hungarian film), a Hungarian film
- Free Fall (2021 film), a short film directed by Emmanuel Tenenbaum about the September 11 attacks; grand prize winner of the 2021 Regard film festival
- Freefall: Flight 174, a 1995 Canadian thriller film
- Free Falling, a 2024 Spanish thriller drama film

=== Television ===
- "Free Fall" (CSI: Miami), a 2006 episode
- "Free Fall" (Ghost Whisperer), a 2006 episode
- "Freefall" (Miami Vice), a 1989 episode
- "Free Falling" (Murdoch Mysteries), a 2018 episode
- "Free Fall" (Pretty Little Liars), a 2014 episode
- "Freefall" (The Unit), a 2007 episode
- "Free Fall" (The Wall), the first round of the American game show The Wall

== Games ==
- Free Fall Associates, a computer game programming company
- Freefall (ride), a type of theme park ride
- Frozen Free Fall, a Disney mobile game based on the Frozen movies

== Music ==
=== Albums and EPs ===
- Free Fall (Jesse Cook album), the fourth album, in 2000, by the New Flamenco artist Jesse Cook
- Free Fall (Dixie Dregs album), a 1977 album by Dixie Dregs
- Free Fall (Jimmy Giuffre album), a 1963 album by jazz musician Jimmy Giuffre
- Free Fall (Magnus Karlsson album), a 2013 album by Magnus Karlsson
- Free Fall (Alvin Lee Band album), a 1980 album by the Alvin Lee Band
- Freefall (album), a 2002 album by Kenny Barron and Regina Carter
- Free Fall (EP), a 2015 EP by Jlin
- Freefall (EP), a 1990 EP by Chapterhouse
- Freefall, a 2016 EP by Au5 featuring Cristina Soto

=== Songs ===
- "Free Fall", by Born of Osiris from Soul Sphere
- "Free Fall", by Coldrain from Optimize
- "Free Fall", by Hawkwind (as Hawklords) from 25 Years On
- "Free Fall", by Illenium from Awake
- "Free Fall", by In Flames from Reroute to Remain
- "Free Fall", by Itzy from Checkmate
- "Free Fall", by Miss May I from Curse of Existence
- "Freefall", by Electronic from Raise the Pressure
- "Freefall" (Armin van Buuren song), featuring BullySongs
- "Freefall" (Nothing More song), 2025
- "Freefall", by Camel from Mirage
- "Freefall", by Fixmer/McCarthy from A Bugged Out Mix
- "Freefall", by Northlane from Alien
- "Freefall" by Single Cell Orchestra from their eponymous album
- "Freefallin", by Zoe Badwi
- "Free Fallin'", by Tom Petty

== Other ==
- The part of a parachute jump, before the parachute opens
