= Jlin =

American electronic musician (born 1987)

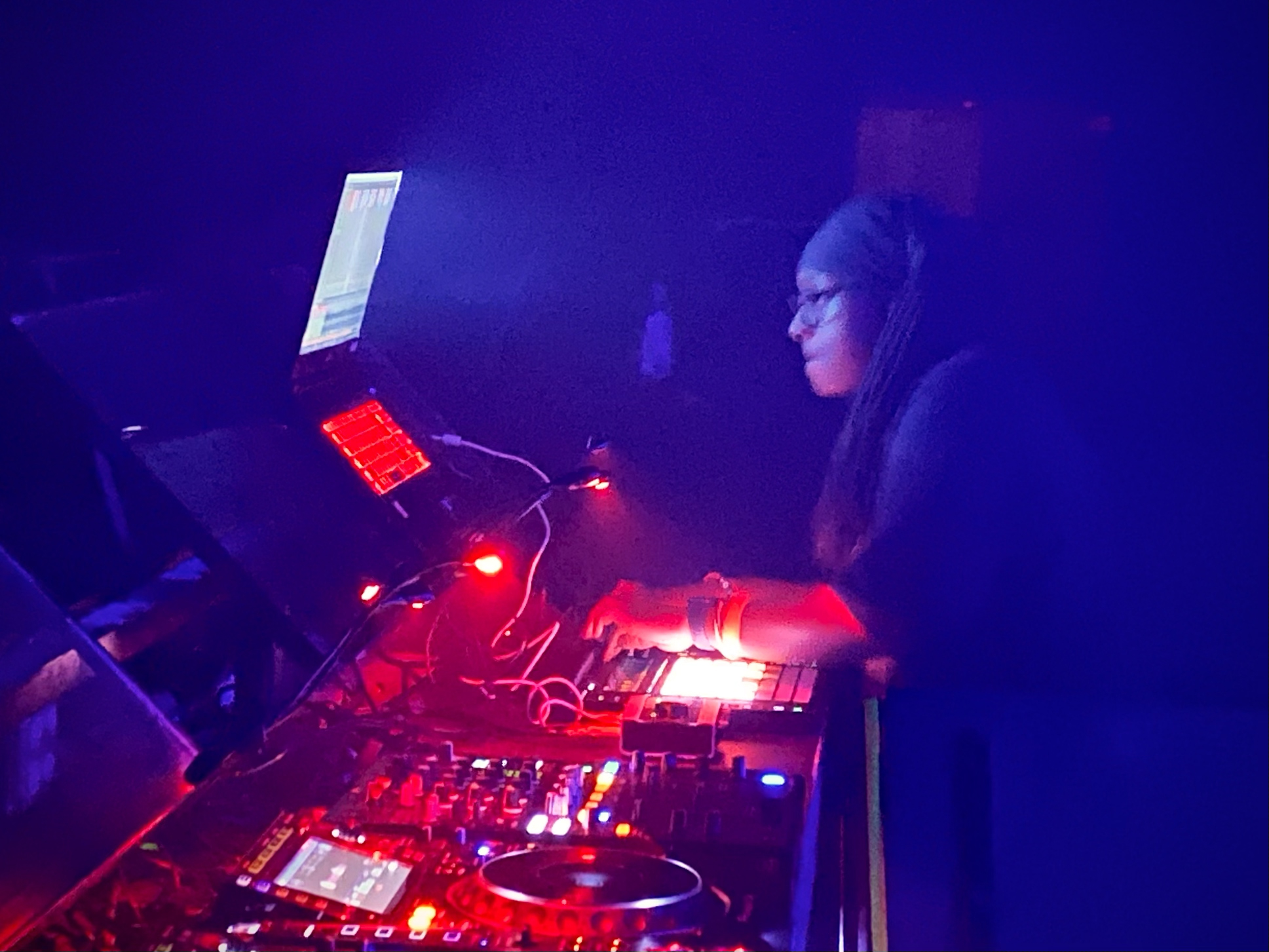
- Jlin performing in Brooklyn in 2021

Background information
- Born: Jerrilynn Patton; July 30, 1987 (age 39); Gary, Indiana, U.S.
- Genres: Electronic; footwork; IDM
- Occupations: Musician; producer; DJ
- Years active: 2008–present
- Label: Planet Mu

Jerrilynn Patton (born July 30, 1987), better known as Jlin, is an American electronic musician. She began producing music in 2008 and received early attention for her 2011 track "Erotic Heat". Jlin's debut album, Dark Energy, was released in 2015 to critical praise. Her follow-up Black Origami (2017) received further acclaim.

== Biography ==
Patton was raised in Gary, Indiana. Growing up, she was exposed to music through her parents, and her favorite artists were Anita Baker, Rachelle Ferrell, and Sade. She also heard footwork at an early age. She briefly attended Purdue University as a math major. As an adult, she supported herself by working at a steel mill, although she claims this did not substantively influence her work. Patton began making her own music in 2008, and was inspired by her mother to pursue a unique sound. She also received encouragement from figures such as DJ Rashad, who she communicated with online.

After making the track "Erotic Heat", she was hesitant to release it because it did not fit the conventional sound of a footwork song. The track was ultimately released on Planet Mu's Bangs & Works, Vol. 2 compilation in 2011, which showcased Chicago juke and footwork artists and brought Jlin attention. The song was later used to accompany a 2014 Rick Owens fashion show. She released her debut album Dark Energy in 2015 to critical acclaim. Dark Energy would help to popularize footwork on a global stage. She also released the Free Fall EP (2015).

In 2017, Jlin released her second album Black Origami. It features collaborations with William Basinski, Holly Herndon, Fawkes, and Dope Saint Jude. It received universal acclaim and was named among the best albums of the year by various publications. In that year, she also released Dark Lotus. Also in 2017, Jlin was commissioned to compose the score for Autobiography, a new work by Company Wayne McGregor that has its premiere at Sadler's Wells in London in October 2017. The Autobiography soundtrack was released in 2018.

In 2020, Jlin created the new work "Perspectives", commissioned by the Boulanger Initiative for performance by Third Coast Percussion. In 2021, she released the Embryo EP. In 2022, she launched a course with online music school Soundfly, "Jlin: Rhythm, Variation, & Vulnerability".

In 2023, Jlin was a finalist for the Pulitzer Prize for Music for her composition Perspective. In that year, she released a mini-album, Perspective.

In 2024, Jlin released her third album, Akoma, which features collaborations with Björk, Philip Glass, and Kronos Quartet.

== Discography ==
=== Studio albums ===
- Dark Energy (Planet Mu, 2015)
- Black Origami (Planet Mu, 2017)
- Akoma (Planet Mu, 2024)

=== Soundtrack albums ===
- Autobiography (Music from Wayne McGregor's Autobiography) (Planet Mu, 2018)

=== Mini-albums ===
- Perspective (Planet Mu, 2023)

=== Extended plays ===
- Free Fall (Planet Mu, 2015)
- Dark Lotus (Planet Mu, 2017)
- Embryo (Planet Mu, 2021)
