= Embryo (disambiguation) =

An embryo is an organism early in its development.

Embryo may also refer to:

- Embryo (film), a 1976 American film starring Rock Hudson
- Embryo (band), a German progressive rock band
- Embryo (EP), a 2021 EP by Jlin
- "Embryo", from the Black Sabbath album Master of Reality
- "Embryo" (Dir En Grey song), 2001
- "Embryo" (Pink Floyd song), 1970
- Embryo Records, record label from the 1970s
- Embryo (video game), a 1994 video game published for the Amiga
- Proto-state or state embryo, a state in development
