= Black Origami =

Studio album by Jlin
- Released: May 11, 2017
- Recorded: 2015–2016
- Genres: Experimental; footwork; IDM
- Length: 44:28
- Label: Planet Mu
- Producer: Jerrilynn Patton

Jlin chronology
| Dark Lotus (2015) | Black Origami (2017) |

Singles from Black Origami
- 1. "Nandi" Released: November 4, 2015; 2. "Nyakinya Rise" Released: January 23, 2017; 3. "Challenge (To Be Continued)" Released: May 2, 2017; 4. "Black Origami" Released: May 4, 2017; 5. "Holy Child" Released: May 10, 2017

Black Origami is the second album by American producer Jlin, first issued for streaming on May 11, 2017 and on other formats by Planet Mu on May 19, 2017. Produced in a year from 2015 to 2016, it features collaborations with William Basinski, Holly Herndon, Fawkes, and Dope Saint Jude. The title of Black Origami describes the structure of the music: the songs are complex pieces that take advantage of silence as much as sounds, similar to how an origami makes intricate art based on plain paper. Two tracks from previous Jlin extended plays appear on Black Origami: "Nandi" from Free Fall (2015) and "Nyakinya Rise" from Dark Lotus (2017).

Black Origami was critically acclaimed upon its release; reviewers highlighted Jlin's increased range in her sound and style, the album's variety of sounds, its percussion and rhythms, and the use of collaborators. Black Origami landed in the top ten of year-end lists by publications such as Exclaim!, Rolling Stone, Spin, Pitchfork, PopMatters, and the Chicago Tribune and was one position shy of making it into the top ten of The Village Voice's annual Pazz & Jop critics poll.

== Production ==
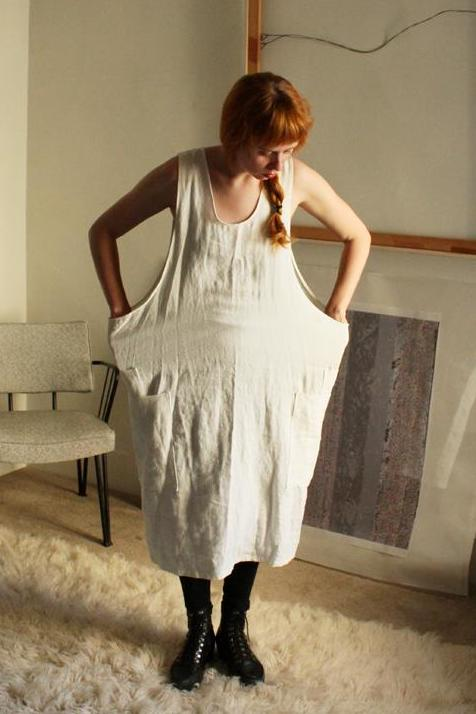
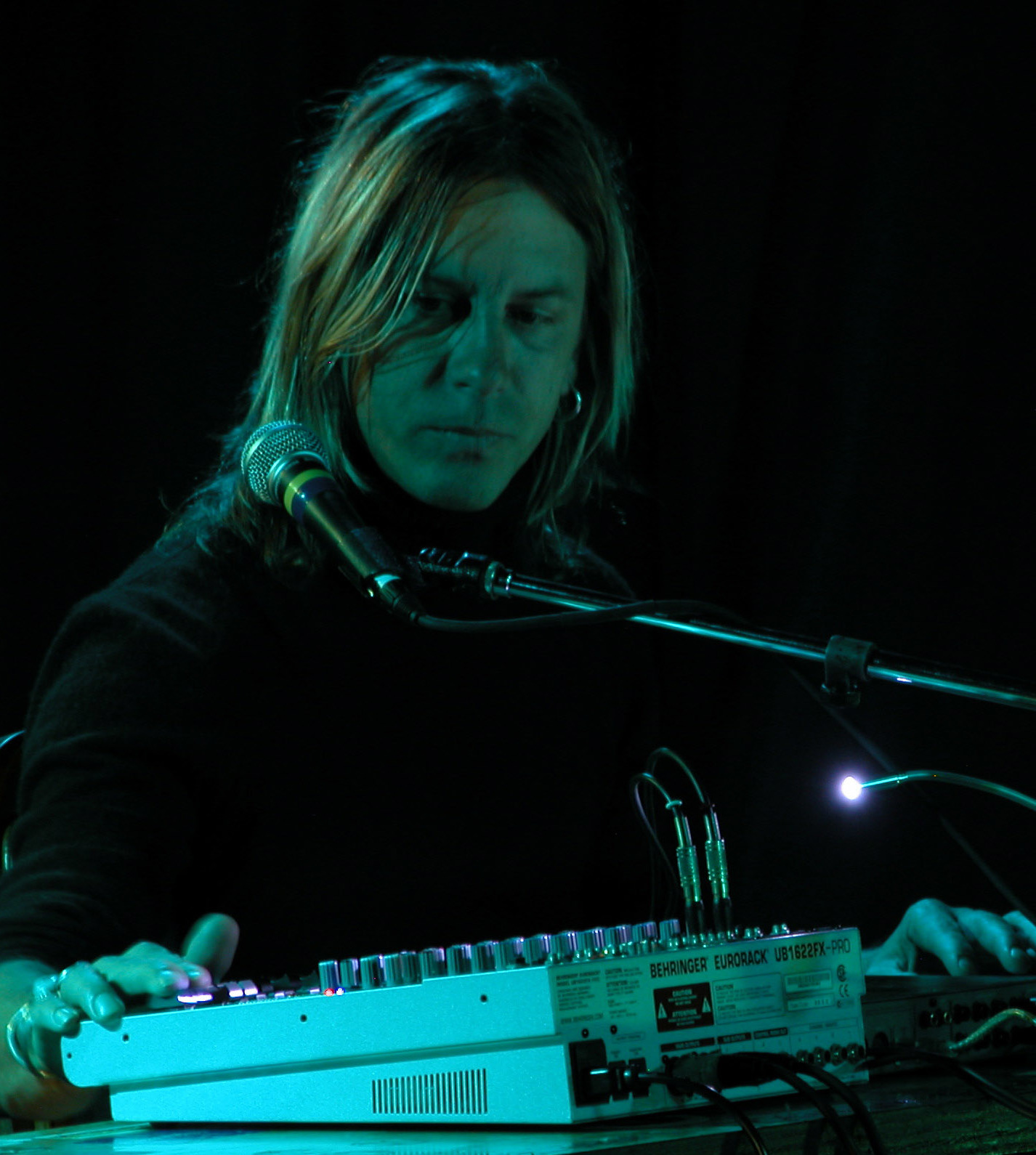
Black Origami features collaborations with Holly Herndon and William Basinski.

Jlin began work on a second album "about May-ish, June-ish of 2015" and completed it a year later. The first track made for it was "Nandi". The next track she worked on was what would become Black Origami's title track, its 24-measure ending of the title track taking three days to complete. She explained that when she made the title track, "I thought I might be onto something and dug deeper. It's started developing into an album before I realized it." After completing the song, Jlin became friends with Indian dancer Avril Stormy Unger. As she explained, "I happened to go to her page one day and I saw videos of her dancing. And I was like, Oh my god, this is it. Her rhythm and movement was matching my rhythm and sound." As a result, Jlin created "Carbon 7" based on Unger's dancing. The next two songs to be completed were "Enigma" and "Hatshepsut", named after an Egyptian queen.

According to Jlin, the staff at Planet Mu called her "stupid because I didn’t wait for someone who should have been on my second album—we had a difference in the work we were collaborating on. Everybody else thought I should have waited and was in total panic mode, so I had to work around them and push past them to make a decision." However, Black Origami still features collaborations with avant-garde producers such as Holly Herndon, William Basinski, Dope Saint Jude, and French artist Fawkes. "Holy Child" began with Jlin emailing a female Baltic folk vocal loop to William Basinski for him to turn into "magic". Basinki first met Jlin unexpectedly during a soundcheck in New York. The penultimate track done for the album was a collaboration with Holly Herndon named "1%". Herndon previously worked with Jlin on "Expand", a track from her debut album Dark Energy (2015). Jlin produced the last songs for the album in India.

== Composition ==
As Exclaim! critic Daniel Sylvester summarized Black Origami, "it's earthy and futuristic, complex and linear, dance-y and a total mind-fuck."

With Black Origami, Jlin, in her words, wanted to do "something different, something that challenged me to my core," and make music "with no boundaries". She wanted to make the music "complex" like an origami, hence the title. As such, Black Origami involves "manipulating silence", much like the "emptiness" of paper origamis are often made of, as much as "volatile beat patterns and otherworldly fragmented sounds," claimed The Fader. The album, as a result, is more spacious than previous Jlin records, to the point where "tracks like the rattling "Enigma" or the glittery splash of "Carbon 7" feel like they should be choreographed with fluid and balletic steps instead of the rapid movements of footwork and juke, even if the rhythms remain at the same BPM as ever," wrote Consequence of Sound's Robert Ham.

As per usual for Jlin's music, the album contains chaotic, unpredictable rhythms and lots of detail in the sound design. In fact, the drums and percussion in the album's original mix sounded so aggressive that Planet Mu instructed the mastering engineer to tone down the harshness of the sound. Black Origami is non-melodic and features sounds of drums, bells, vocal snippets, whistles, and world music percussion samples. It is "propelled by the sheer force of her percussion, her ornate, radical progressions, her shape-shifting sounds," and "an undercurrent of menace", wrote Rebecca Bengal.

Some reviewers noted the album's multicultural influences in the music, particularly of Eastern music. They range from marching-band-style drums ("Hatshepsut") to Bollywood percussion ("Kyanite") to American hip-hop drums ("Never Created, Never Destroyed"). A review by Ham noted Jlin's activities of traveling around the world she did after Dark Energy gained popularity; he suggested that on Black Origami, she "absorb[s] those experiences and influences and bring[s] them to bear on her work with clarity and speed."

Jlin stated Black Origami was not a footwork album, and some publications opined she was right, Spin magazine reasoning the music was "too ornate" and "self-possessed" to be categorized as footwork. On the other hand, Treble magazine claimed the album "echoes and expands on the range" of the genre. AllMusic called the album "fluid and delicate" for a footwork record, also analyzing it is "informed by ballet and contemporary dance in addition to more club-oriented dance styles." Writer Andrew Nosnitsky wrote that Black Origami is several genres "and none of them at once. It’s a rhythm-spanning collection of contradictions and colliding worlds—the intensity of social music refracted through an introverted mind, the physical converted into digital and back again, the past told through future music and vice versa—all making the case that rhythm is too infinite, too forceful to be reduced to mere utilitarian functions."

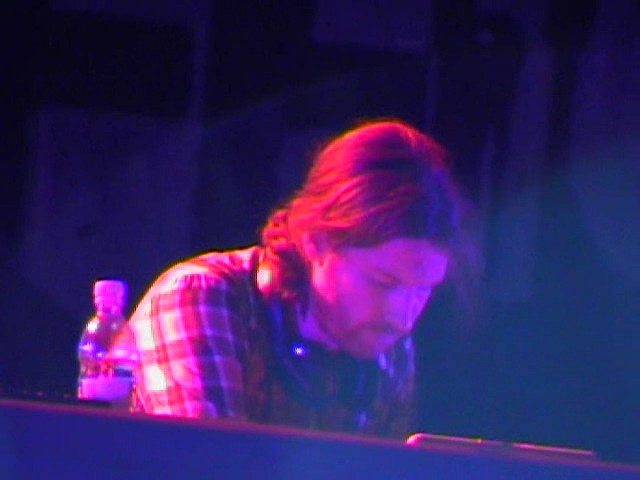
Some critics compared Black Origami to the 1990s work of Aphex Twin.

Journalist Ben Cardew found Black Origami akin to the 1990s works of Photek, Squarepusher, and Aphex Twin, where it takes "the rhythmic intensity of drum and bass and squeeze[s] and contort[s] it into fascinating new shapes." Spin also compared it to the 1990s music of Aphex Twin for its "determination to plumb the horizontal possibilities of dance music." While most of the tracks are very percussion-heavy, the album also occasionally veers into more ambient pieces like "Calcination". It also features several elements of witch house.

== Release and promotion ==
Jlin announced a follow-up to Dark Energy on April 15, 2016 via an interview with the Line Noise Podcast. She stated it would "veer very far left of footwork", would either be named Black Origami: The Motherboard or Black Origami: Dark Lotus, and was planned to be issued in March 2017. "Nandi" first appeared on Jlin's extended play Free Fall (2015) and was released as a single on November 4, 2015. "Nyakinya Rise" was previously on another Jlin EP titled Dark Lotus and was issued as a single on January 23, 2017. Three more singles were released from Black Origami: "Challenge (To Be Continued)", which premiered via The Fader on May 2, 2017, the title track, which Mixmag made available alongside an interview on May 4, 2017, and "Holy Child". which was released on May 10, 2017.

On May 23, 2017, the video for "Carbon 7" was released. Directed by Joji Koyama, it involves a man played by dancer Corey Scott-Gilbert moving through a dark warehouse. NPR Music first distributed the album for streaming on May 11, 2017, before Planet Mu issued it to CD, digital download, and vinyl on May 19, 2017. As Jlin described the album's cover art, "I love elephants. I. Love. Elephants. Elephants are the most precious thing to me on this planet. So, I asked my label when we designed the cover art [that] I wanted an origami of an elephant. And they sure enough, I don’t know how they did it, they delivered. So there we go."

== Critical reception ==
Professional ratings
Aggregate scores
| Source | Rating |
|---|---|
| AnyDecentMusic? | 8.2/10 |
| Metacritic | 89/100 |
Review scores
| Source | Rating |
| AllMusic | 5/5 stars |
| Clash | 8/10 |
| Consequence of Sound | A− |
| Exclaim! | 9/10 |
| The Irish Times | 4/5 stars |
| Mixmag | 8/10 |
| Pitchfork | 8.8/10 |
| PopMatters | 8/10 |
| Resident Advisor | 4.2/5 |
| Tiny Mix Tapes | 4/5 |

Upon its release, Black Origami garnered critical acclaim, some reviewers calling it a breakthrough record for Jlin and one of the best albums of 2017 (see the Accolades section for more information). A Spin reviewer honored it as the "future of progressive club music. It is bold, precise, cross-cultural and far more intelligent than waning genres both outside (like rock) and inside (think tech house or even traditional footwork) the dance music world."

Ham called Black Origami, "from all pre-release accounts, the byproduct of an artist finally seeing the world beyond her own backyard." Gigsoup claimed, "While the record will undoubtedly be included on numerous year-end lists, its long-term value lies in its potential to dissolve arbitrary genre restraints and lift similar artists to greater heights." Cardew positively compared it to Aphex Twin for its possibilities in analyzing it academically while also being able to dance to it. Sylvester wrote that with the album, she "broadens the scope of [her style] to create an album beaming with ambition and one-of-a-kind vision." He and a Dusted magazine critic praised its use of collaborators, Sylvester reasoning they gave their respective songs their "own distinct personality." Like Sylvester, Ammar Kalia of Clash magazine wrote that the LP "showcases an artist widening her scope of production, whilst maintaining an ear and a place for the dance floor birthplace of her genre."

Cardew praised the diversity of percussion sounds on the LP, which "range from marching bands to gongs to tablas." The "mastery of percussion" was also honored in a Crack Magazine review, which used the interplay between vocals and drums on "Enigma" and "unsettling microtonal melodies and moments of pure flight amid bottomless sub tumbles" on "Holy Child" as examples. Irish critic Jim Carroll claimed the album "will take your breath away", praising its "scope of the sounds" and "the skill which Jlin uses to marshal the percussive power at her disposal." August Brown of Los Angeles Times called the percussion "intricate and punishing, industrial and artful."

Black Origami received a "Best New Music" label from Pitchfork, who called it a "pure exercise in sound-as-power, music that has no specific agenda beyond simply making itself felt." PopMatters critic Andrew Dorsett noted that the album is "not for everyone", but this fact contributes to the quality because "Jlin has no interest in pleasing anyone, in particular, focusing instead on perfecting her technique and adhering faithfully to her influences and interests." Dorsett also praised how "highly ordered, even regimented" the otherwise chaotic rhythms were, describing the album as a "masterstroke of sheer timing". Resident Advisor honored it as a unique electronic album for being both "intimidating" while also "powerful and distinctive".

The 405 critic Brody Kenny favorably stated, "this is not the work of somebody wanting to shortcut their way into making “atmospheric” music by cutting and pasting old ideas. Rather, it's the mark of someone establishing their unique authorship with the utmost certitude." He highlighted Black Origami's use of tension, writing that the album "shifts moods with enough subtlety to sustain a through line but enough variation to prevent the album from ever losing your attention." He also called it distinct from most experimental albums, because "familiarity with it through multiple listens [doesn't do] anything to lessen the tension it creates. Rather than throwing the listener into a half-hearted mystical void, Jlin has instead created an incredible hyperreality." In a more mixed review, Spectrum Culture stated Black Origami was a "fascinating" listen but criticized it for being "heavy on ideas and light on animal pleasures:" "The sound design is often astonishing, [...] But one can only do so much just with drums, and though the sounds are arranged in beguiling ways, none are particularly weird, and it doesn’t twist its way around the brain the way an equally weird footwork record like Foodman’s Couldwork might."

== Accolades ==
=== Semester-end lists ===
| Publication | Accolade | Rank | Ref. |
|---|---|---|---|
| The A.V. Club | The Best Albums of 2017 So Far | * | |
| Consequence of Sound | Top 25 Albums of 2017 (So Far) | 5 | |
| Spin | 50 Best Albums of 2017 So Far | 7 | |
| Stereogum | 50 Best Albums of 2017 So Far | 35 | |
| The Vinyl Factory | 20 Best Albums of 2017 So Far | * | |
"*" indicates an unordered list.

=== Year-end lists ===
In The Village Voice's Pazz & Jop, an poll regarding the best albums of the year as voted by more than 400 American music critics, Black Origami ranked number eleven with 345 points.

| Publication | Accolade | Rank | Ref. |
|---|---|---|---|
| AllMusic | Best of 2017 | * | |
| AllMusic | Best of 2017: Favorite Electronic Albums | * | |
| Baltimore Beat | Top 10 Non-Baltimore Albums of 2017 | 1 | |
| Bandcamp Daily | The Best Albums of 2017 | 2 | |
| Bleep.com | Top 10 Albums of the Year 2017 | * | |
| Chicago Tribune | Top 10 Chicago Indie Albums | 3 | |
| Consequence of Sound | Top 50 Albums of 2017 | 23 | |
| Crack Magazine | The Top 100 Albums of 2017 | 20 | |
| Digital Trends | 50 Best Albums of 2017 | 21 | |
| Exclaim! | Top 10 Dance and Electronic Albums of 2017 | 3 | |
| Fact | The 50 Best Albums of 2017 | 11 | |
| Gorilla vs. Bear | Albums of 2017 | 40 | |
| The Morning News | The Top Albums of 2017 | —N/a | |
| Mixmag | The Top 50 Albums of 2017 | 8 | |
"*" indicates an unordered list.

| Publication | Accolade | Rank | Ref. |
|---|---|---|---|
| Noisey | The 100 Best Albums of 2017 | 18 | |
| Now | The 10 Best Albums of 2017 | 8 | |
| NPR Music | The 50 Best Albums of 2017 | 16 | |
| Passion of the Weiss | Best Albums of 2017 | 6 | |
| Passion of the Weiss | Best Electronic Albums of 2017 | * | |
| Piccadilly Records | End of Year Review 2017: Top 100 Albums | 74 | |
| Pitchfork | The 50 Best Albums of 2017 | 10 | |
| Pitchfork | The 20 Best Electronic Albums of 2017 | 2 | |
| PopMatters | The 60 Best Albums of 2017 | 10 | |
| Red Bull Music Academy | The Best Albums of 2017 | * | |
| Resident Advisor | 2017's Best Albums | * | |
| Rolling Stone | 50 Best Albums of 2017 | 23 | |
| Rolling Stone | 20 Best EDM and Electronic Albums of 2017 | 1 | |
| Rough Trade | Albums of the Year 2017 | * | |
"*" indicates an unordered list.

| Publication | Accolade | Rank | Ref. |
|---|---|---|---|
| The Quietus and Norman Records | Albums Of The Year 2017 | 35 | |
| The Skinny | Top 50 Albums of 2017 | 33 | |
| Spectrum Culture | Top 20 Albums of 2017 | * | |
| Spin | 50 Best Albums of 2017 | 6 | |
| Stereogum | The 50 Best Albums of 2017 | 44 | |
| Time Out New York | 29 Best Albums of 2017 | 13 | |
| Tiny Mix Tapes | 2017: Favorite 50 Music Releases | 22 | |
| Treble | The Top 50 Albums of 2017 | 26 | |
| Treble | The 10 Best Electronic Albums of 2017 | 1 | |
| The Village Voice | Pazz & Jop | 11 | |
| The Vinyl Factory | 50 Favourite Albums of 2017 | 35 | |
| The Wire | Top 50 Releases of 2017 | 4 | |
| XLR8R | Best of 2017: Releases | * | |
"*" indicates an unordered list.

== Track listing ==
All tracks are written by Jerrilynn Patton except where noted.

Black Origami
| No. | Title | Composer | Length |
|---|---|---|---|
| 1. | "Black Origami" | | 4:30 |
| 2. | "Enigma" | | 3:48 |
| 3. | "Kyanite" | | 4:25 |
| 4. | "Holy Child" | Patton, William Basinski | 4:04 |
| 5. | "Nyakinyua Rise" | | 3:40 |
| 6. | "Hatshepsut" | | 4:40 |
| 7. | "Calcination" | Patton, Fawkes | 1:38 |
| 8. | "Carbon 7 (161)" | | 4:13 |
| 9. | "Nandi" | | 3:30 |
| 10. | "1%" | Patton, Holly Herndon | 3:46 |
| 11. | "Never Created, Never Destroyed" | Patton, Dope Saint Jude | 3:31 |
| 12. | "Challenge (To Be Continued)" | | 2:43 |

Sample credits

- "1%" samples the line "You’re all going to die down here" from the video game Resident Evil (2002).

== Personnel ==
- Jlin / Jerrilynn Patton – composition, production
- Beau Thomas – mastering
- Robert J. Lang and Kevin Box – artwork
- Bill Stengel – photo
- Joe Shakespeare and Fabian Harb – sleeve

== Release history ==
| Region | Date | Format(s) | Label |
|---|---|---|---|
| Worldwide | May 11, 2017 | Streaming | NPR Music |
| Worldwide | May 19, 2017 | CD; digital download; vinyl | Planet Mu |
