= Higher Self (Dope Saint Jude album) =

EP by Dope Saint Jude
- Released: April 2, 2022
- Genre: Hip Hop, Alternative R&B, Electronic music
- Length: 16:00
- Language: English
- Label: Yotanka

Dope Saint Jude chronology
Resilient (2018)	Higher Self (2022)

Singles from Higher Self
- 1. "Home" Released: January 26, 2022

Higher Self is the third extended play by South African rapper Dope Saint Jude. It was released on 2 April 2022 through the French record label, Yotanka. The 6-track album is composed of Dope Saint Jude's vocals combined with elements of alternative R&B and electronic music.

== Background ==
Dope Saint Jude explaining the album:

Higher Self' is my most introspective EP thus far. I wrote it during the height of the pandemic, having being afforded time to pause and reflect on my life. I had moved to another country, found love and was steadily forging my path in the world. It became necessary to mark this moment. A good friend once told me that making music is like casting spells, and I take that very seriously. I believe that the music I make can define my existence, so it is important to me to make music that is pure and reflective of where I am, where I want to be and where I am going. The EP starts with "War" a track dedicated to the memory of my mother and grandmother. Like many African women, the lives of my mom and grandmother were often marked by sacrifice and suffering. This track is my commitment to break that cycle and do good on the emotional, mental and spiritual investment they made in me.

== Singles ==
The third single "You're Gonna Make it" was featured on the Netflix show, Inventing Anna.

The single "Home" was released on January 26, 2022, with the music video shortly following after. The song addresses the intimacy and tenderness of a relationship. Dope Saint Jude speaking to Attitude Magazine about the inspiration behind the song and video:

I wrote the track during lockdown when I was unable to visit home. During the pandemic, my wife Roxanne and I moved into our first unshared apartment and began the process of building a home together. The track celebrates the many different facets that make up the feeling of 'home'… It was important for me to capture the essence of our relationship in this video. It has some BDSM elements, some more playful elements, and overall gives the audience insight into the intimacy shared by two women.

== Track listing ==
Higher Self
No.	Title	Length
1.	"For You"	4:17
2.	"I Don't Know You Like That"	3:16
3.	"You're Gonna Make It"	3:32
4.	"Keep Your Head Up"	3:15
5.	"Home"	3:38
6.	"Higher Self" (featuring Lana Crowster)	3:38
Total length:		21:00

== Release history ==
List of release dates, showing region, formats, label, editions and reference
Region	Date	Format(s)	Label	Edition(s)	Ref.
Various	2 April 2022	CD; Vinyl; digital download; streaming	Yotanka	Standard	
