= Georges Collinet =

Cameroonian-French-American radio host (born 1940?)

M'vam Georges Collinet (born 1940?), also known in his early career by the nickname Maxi Voom Voom, is a Cameroonian-French-American broadcaster. He is known for hosting radio shows, such as the internationally distributed radio program Afropop Worldwide; and for hosting and creating documentary television shows and films. From 1965 until the late 1990s, Collinet hosted a hugely popular morning show broadcast by Voice of America which had over 120 million daily listeners. He is widely considered the best-known and most famous broadcaster on the African continent.

Most, if not all, of his work focuses on Africa. He has broadcast in French and English.

== Early life ==
Collinet was born in Cameroon to a Cameroonian mother (whose lineage was Bulu) and a French father. While still a youth, he moved to France, where he received his education and lived in Neris-les-Bains with his paternal grandmother.

== Career ==
His broadcasting career began in the early 1960s at Voice of America. From 1965 to the late 1990s, he hosted a morning radio show on VoA which boasted an audience of over 120 million people. This show made him famous in many African countries and was notable for his encyclopedic knowledge about African pop and his enormous enthusiasm for the music and musicians. His exuberant personality broadcast well and made him a household name to many, at all levels of society.

Although he moved to the United States in 1959, and still resides there, during the 1970s and 1980s he worked in Paris with African musicians to develop their music and sustain their musical heritage.

In 1988 he began hosting the radio program Afropop Worldwide, which he continues to do while also working on television programs and films. In August 2026, Afropop Worldwide featured an episode celebrating Collinet's fifty years in broadcasting.

Collinet has been instrumental in creating the Maracas D'Or (the African version of the Grammy Awards) as well as "the first journal in Paris devoted to contemporary African music".

Collinet has directed as well as developed television productions as well as films. George Collinet Productions (a.k.a. G C Productions) is based in Washington, D.C.

In 2007 he started the popular weekly podcast at the World Bank in Washington, D.C., called On the Move.

== Personal life ==
Georges Collinet resides in northwest Washington, D.C., with his wife, Louise (Cooki) and son Georges-Alexandre.
