= Resilience week =

Resilience week is an annual symposium established to enable cross-disciplinary and role based discussions to advance strategies and research that engenders resilience in critical infrastructure systems and communities. Damaging storms, cyber attack and the interconnection of critical infrastructure systems can lead to cascading events that not only affect local but also across regions. However, many of these interdependencies are not easily recognized and obscure and complicate the mitigation of risk. The purpose of the symposia series is hence to facilitate best practice in managing critical infrastructure risks, by bringing together businesses, government and researchers.

== Background ==
Originally organized in 2008 as a focus on the new research area of resilient control systems, including the disciplinary areas of control system, cyber-security, cognitive psychology and any number of critical infrastructure domains. Resilience has long been recognized as an area that requires not only the contributions of multiple disciplines or multidisciplinary participation, but interdisciplinary interaction where there is a common language and familiarity of the contributors to what other disciplines (and roles) contribute. The resulting interactions developed by Resilience Week and associated activities are intended to culture this sharing environment as a safe zone for inclusion; more importantly, an environment that lends to developing the new science and practice.

As the attributes of resilience are complex, the contributions and topics for the event have included both the disciplinary and the project considerations, in keynotes, panels and research presentations. Keynotes have included senior leadership in the Department of Energy, Department of Defense, Department of Homeland Security, the National Science Foundation, and other agencies in addition to National Academy and professional organization fellows and senior industry leaders. Project panels and research presentations include emergent topics in resilience to climate change, cyber attack, damaging storms and the energy assurance.

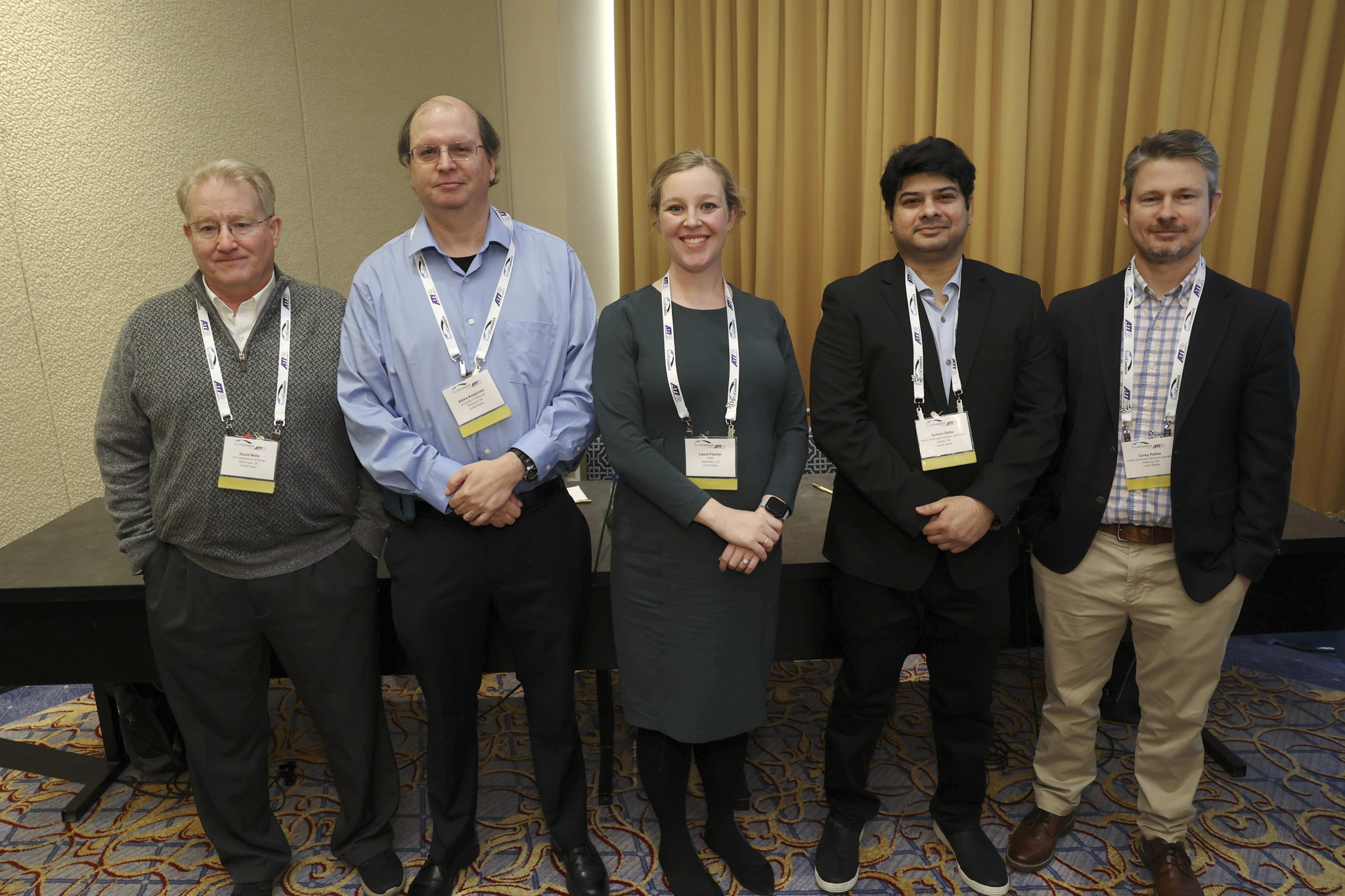
Panel at Resilience Week 2023

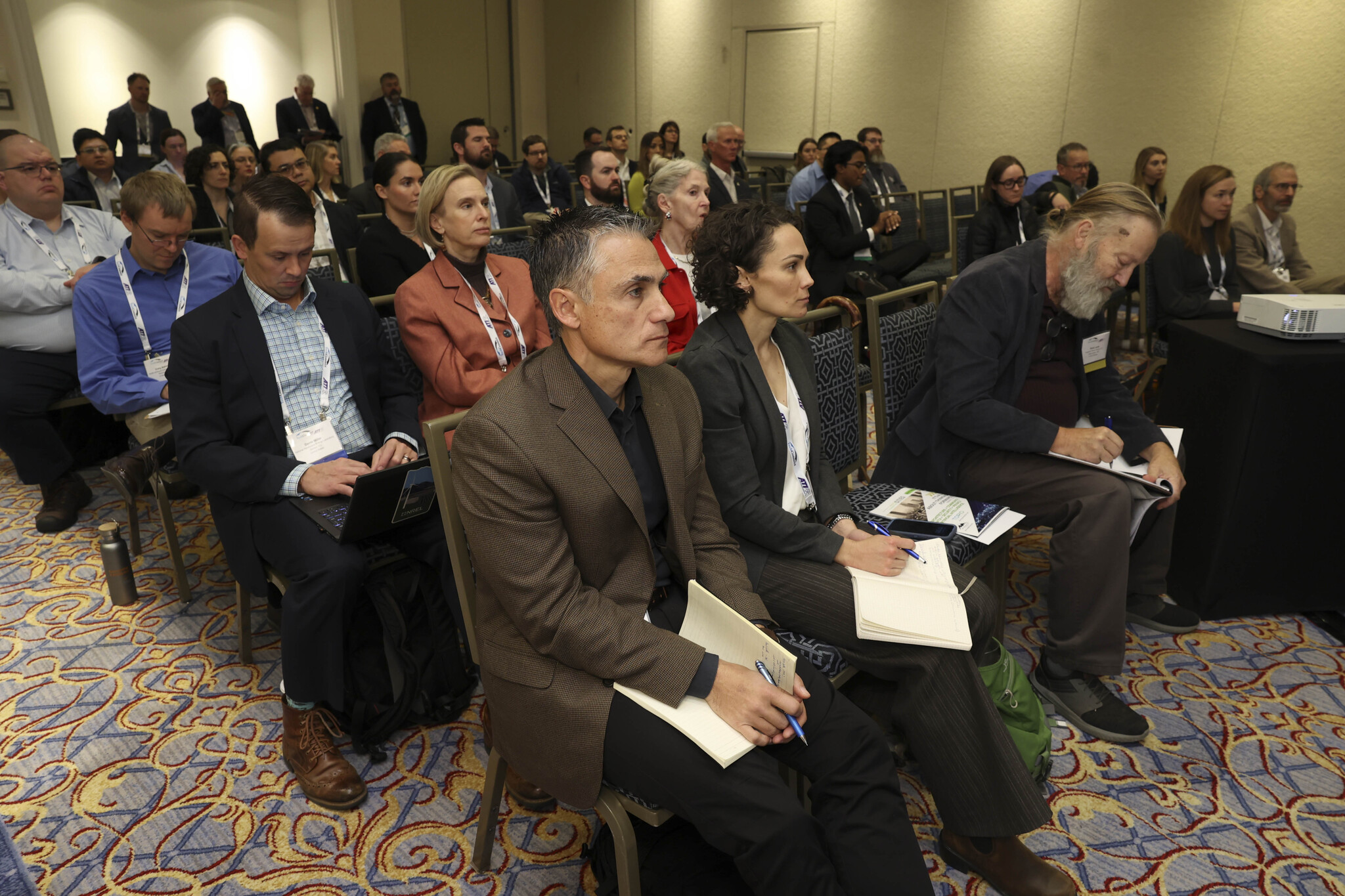
Panel Audience at Resilience Week 2023

- Topics Areas of focus have included:
  - Control Systems
  - Cyber Systems
  - Cognitive Systems
  - Communications Systems
  - Communities and Infrastructure
- Project Focus Areas have included:
  - Dependencies and Interdependencies
  - Cyber Resilience for Operating Technology
  - Commercializing Research and Development
  - Building Critical Infrastructure Resilience through Distributed Energy Resources
  - Energy Equity and Community Resilience

Proceedings are developed for each year of the event, documenting the diversity of the research and engagements within these topical areas.

== Impacts for the future ==
Since its inception, the Resilience Week community has evolved from one that primarily included only university researchers to one that includes many government laboratories, universities and private industries in the US and internationally. This type of collaboration forms a feedback loop that informs the research with the current needs and hones best practices. The future of the event is to further advance discussions that advance investment, recognize priorities and expedite technologies and tools to proactively address our energy future, in light of the natural and manmade challenges, and rationalizing the complex relationships that exist in critical infrastructure.
