= Afropop Worldwide =

American public radio program

- Other names: APWW, Afropop
- Genre: Music showcase
- Running time: 60 minutes
- Country of origin: United States
- Language: English
- Syndicates: Public Radio Exchange
- Hosted by: Georges Collinet
- Created by: Sean Barlow
- Produced by: Sean Barlow, Banning Eyre, Ned Sublette, Marlon Bishop, Wills Glasspiegel, Saxon Baird
- Recording studio: Brooklyn, New York City, New York
- Original release: 1988 – Present
- Audio format: Stereophonic sound
- Website: www.afropop.org
- Podcast: www.afropop.org/podcast/afropop.xml

Afropop Worldwide is a radio program that presents the music of Africa and the African diaspora. The program is produced by Sean Barlow for World Music Productions in Brooklyn, New York City, New York. It is hosted by the veteran Cameroonian broadcaster Georges Collinet, who previously attained renown for his work with Voice of America.

Afropop Worldwide launched in 1988 as Afropop, a weekly public radio series, in response to widespread interest in international pop music. The first of its kind, it later expanded to include the music and cultures of the entire African diaspora. The program is distributed by Public Radio Exchange (PRX) to over a hundred radio stations in the United States. It is also heard in Europe and Africa.

In 2014, the program was awarded an institutional Peabody Award for "its pioneering role in the 'world music' movement".

The producers have explained the show's mission:

Our vision is to increase the profile of African and African Diaspora music worldwide, and to see that benefits go back to artists, music industry professionals, and the countries that produce the music. The Afropop database is central to our strategy as it harnesses the power of what we have done, and allows us to integrate past work with new research to support new projects. We are working in partnership with Calabash Music to help musicians from Africa, the Caribbean and Latin America leapfrog over the barriers of the conventional music business and take advantage of the emerging digital marketplace for global music.
