= Free Fall (EP) =

EP by Jlin
- Released: November 27, 2015
- Length: 14:07
- Label: Planet Mu
- Producer: Jerrilynn Patton

Jlin chronology
Dark Energy (2015)	Free Fall (2015)	Dark Lotus (2017)

Free Fall is an EP by American record producer Jerrilynn Patton under the pseudonym Jlin. It was released on November 27, 2015, through Planet Mu.

== Background ==
Jerrilynn Patton, also known under the pseudonym Jlin, is an American record producer from Gary, Indiana. Free Fall is a follow-up to Dark Energy (2015). It contains four tracks: "Eu4ria", "I Am the Queen", "BuZilla", and "Nandi". "BuZilla" is a reworking of RP Boo's "Heavy Heat". "I Am the Queen" is dedicated to Crystal James, a footwork dancer from Chicago, Illinois. "Nandi" is dedicated to Nandi, the mother of Shaka Zulu. The EP was released on November 27, 2015, through Planet Mu.

== Critical reception ==
Professional ratings
Review scores
Source	Rating
AllMusic	3.5/5 stars
Mixmag	8/10
Pitchfork	7.6/10
PopMatters	7/10
Resident Advisor	4.0/5
Tiny Mix Tapes	3/5 stars

Britt Julious of Pitchfork stated, "Whereas Dark Energy was fueled by a personal, cinematic vision of doom, Free Fall is an invigorating wash of sounds, a collection of ideas that meld together the past with Patton's present to form another hard-won and potent artistic statement." Paul Simpson of AllMusic commented that "The EP's four tracks seem more playful than the ones on Dark Energy, while remaining sinister and aggressive." He called it "a worthwhile release, and probably the most DJ-friendly entry in the Jlin catalog." Kevin Korber of PopMatters wrote, "Obviously, Free Fall isn't the sort of watershed release that Dark Energy was, but Jlin's talent clearly hasn't diminished." He added, "As a collection of disparate ideas, the EP remains thrilling despite its disjointed nature."

== Legacy ==
The EP's track "I Am the Queen" is used in I Am the Queen (2018), a short film about the women of Chicago footwork. Created by Kenesha Sheridan and Wills Glasspiegel, it contains interviews, archival footage, and party scenes.

== Track listing ==
All tracks are written by Jerrilynn Patton.

Free Fall track listing
No.	Title	Length
1.	"Eu4ria"	2:47
2.	"I Am the Queen"	3:22
3.	"BuZilla"	4:25
4.	"Nandi"	3:31
Total length:		14:07

== Personnel ==
Credits adapted from liner notes.

- Jerrilynn Patton – production
