= Resilient (Dope Saint Jude album) =

EP by Dope Saint Jude
- Released: November 2, 2018
- Genre: Hip Hop
- Length: 16:00
- Language: English
- Label: Dope Saint Jude

Dope Saint Jude chronology
Reimagine (2016)	Resilient (2018)	Higher Self (2022)

Singles from Resilient
- 1. "Grrrl Like" Released: September 14, 2018

Resilient is the second EP album by South African rapper Dope Saint Jude. It was released on 2 November 2018 through her record label, Dope Saint Jude. The 5-track album was recorded in London and produced by London-based producers Pete ‘Boxsta’ Martin and Dantae Johnson.

== Background ==
Dope Saint Jude talking about the inspiration behind the name of the album:

I thought it was an appropriate name because when I was younger my mum use to tell me ‘Catherine you are resilient’ and I didn’t really think I was… being resilient means being able to get over tough situations really quickly and I didn’t think I could do that.

== Singles ==
The single "Grrrl Like" was released on September 14, 2018 and was created to reference the underground feminist punk movement from the 90s, Riot Grrrl. The song also appeared in the episode The Astronomers in Turtlenecks and was featured in a promotional clip in the Apple TV series, Dickinson. The music video was released on 8 October 2018 and directed by Dope Saint Jude. The music video showcases black women triumphing in their own terms.

The single, "Liddy" is the third single from the album. The music video was released on 12 April 2019 and shows a day in the life of the rapper and her friends living their best life.

== Track listing ==
Resilient
No.	Title	Length
1.	"Who I Am"	3:13
2.	"Grrrl Like"	2:54
3.	"Liddy"	3:32
4.	"Didn't Come to Play"	3:15
5.	"Inside"	3:14
Total length:		16:00

== Release history ==
List of release dates, showing region, formats, label, editions and reference
Region	Date	Format(s)	Label	Edition(s)	Ref.
Various	2 November 2018	CD; digital download; streaming	Dope Saint Jude	Standard	
