= Embryo (EP) =

EP by Jlin
- Released: December 10, 2021
- Length: 14:20
- Label: Planet Mu
- Producer: Jlin

Jlin chronology
Autobiography (2018)	Embryo (2021)	Perspective (2023)

Embryo is an EP by American record producer Jerrilynn Patton under the pseudonym Jlin. It was released on December 10, 2021, through Planet Mu.

== Background ==
Jerrilynn Patton, also known under the pseudonym Jlin, is an American record producer from Gary, Indiana. Embryo consists of four tracks: "Embryo", "Auto Pilot", "Connect the Dots", and "Rabbit Hole". The EP was created during the COVID-19 pandemic. She stated, "I wrote all these pieces in between commissions and trying to stay afloat mentally." The EP's title track was originally written for the Chicago-based ensemble Third Coast Percussion.

== Release ==
Embryo was released on December 10, 2021, through Planet Mu. Embryo's four tracks are included in the CD edition of Jlin's 2023 mini-album, Perspective.

Third Coast Percussion's rendition of the composition "Embryo" is included in the group's 2022 album, Perspectives.

== Critical reception ==
Professional ratings
Review scores
Source	Rating
AllMusic	3.5/5 stars
Crack	7/10
Pitchfork	7.4/10
Spectrum Culture	70%

Adam Quarshie of Crack wrote, "The squelchy bass lines and breathless kick drums here are borrowed from classic Detroit techno, but rather than being a nostalgic record, these elements have been allowed to morph into something else – a frantic and menacing hybrid." He added, "The EP as a whole has a grainier, less polished texture than some of her previous work." Jayson Greene of Pitchfork stated, "It's fun to listen to her toying with corroded sounds, degraded outputs: Jlin's never sounded quite this grimy before." Paul Simpson of AllMusic commented that "All four tracks are brief and concise, and as its title indicates, Embryo marks the start of something new."

=== Accolades ===
Year-end lists for "Embryo"
Publication	List	Rank	Ref.
Pitchfork	The 100 Best Songs of 2021	23	
The Quietus	Quietus Tracks of the Year 2021	14	

== Track listing ==
All tracks are written by Jlin.

Embryo track listing
No.	Title	Length
1.	"Embryo"	3:53
2.	"Auto Pilot"	3:42
3.	"Connect the Dots"	3:21
4.	"Rabbit Hole"	3:22
Total length:		14:20

== Personnel ==
Credits adapted from liner notes.

- Jlin – production
- Beau Thomas – mastering
- Joseph Shakespeare – design
- Fabian Harb – design
