= Resilience in art =

In art, resilience is the capacity of the work of art to preserve through aesthetics its particularity distinguishing it from any other object, despite the increasing subjectivization in the production of works. Resilience in art appears as a response to the gradual setting aside of beauty during the twentieth century resulting today in an inability to define the work of art.

== History ==
The late nineteenth and twentieth century saw the birth of art movements such as Symbolism, Cubism and Surrealism which sought to adjust to the great social, industrial, economic and political changes that were taking place at the time. Parallel to these movements is a series of strangest movements such as Hirsutes, Hydropathes, Incohérents and highly politicized and subversive movements such as Constructivism, Suprematism, Futurism and Dada. These movements, combined with Anglo-Saxon Analytic Aesthetics from the 1950s which is characterized by the rejection of the notion of beauty as the foundation of art, call into question the very existence of the work of art as a specific human achievement.

The Analytic Aesthetics will base art on the consensus of the "world of art", thus accepting that any object whatsoever may be considered as art as long as it is shown in a place provided for this purpose. Thus art no longer offers homogeneity linked to a cultural substratum but a plurality of individualities. It does not unfold in time, its duration often becomes ephemeral. Beauty is considered superfluous, asserting that a work of art does not have to be based on beauty, for it is self-sufficient.

Analytic Aesthetics is rooted in the philosophy of the eighteenth century when philosophers, like Edmund Burke or Herbart claim that there is no existing beauty by itself. Beauty is not in the object itself but in the subject who experiences some emotion. Little by little, the idea of beauty gives way to the feeling of beauty. The objective definition of the beautiful becomes impossible, it is relegated to the subjective evaluation of the viewer. Thus the theory of beauty that has been a knowledge based on mathematics since the Greeks becomes a subjective aesthetic feeling. Added to this, theories on autonomy of ugliness will encourage the proliferation of the most random, unsightly and provocative productions in the context of contemporary art. What one can argue with the analytic aesthetic is that in his analyzes he does not start from art as a conceptual unit but relies on the artist's achievements at a certain historical moment. Analytical philosophers choose Marcel Duchamp's urinal and Andy Warhol's work as a foundation for their position and as a new starting point. The same can be said about postmodern thinking and the "unrepresentable" in Jean-François Lyotard, which is also linked to European histories.

Other factors have had a significant impact on the confusing situation in art today. Throughout the twentieth century different fields of knowledge have focused on art: Philosophy, Sociology, Psychoanalysis, History of Art, Economy, which led to a dismemberment of the very notion of art. Each branch has emphasized some of the peculiarities of this very complex "world" that is art. Everyone has made contributions on this or that facet by losing sight of the totality. The domains have separated, each with its own criteria. As a result, follows an erroneous conclusion about the impossibility of the definition of art and the complete absence of the capacity of judgment of the quality of the works, therefore of the recognition of a production as being art. What Lyotard will call the bursting of the "grand narratives" of modernity, which envisioned humanity engaged on the path of emancipation, has contributed to the advent of the autonomous subject which becomes the finality in itself. Postmodern thinking will value differences and particularisms based solely on individual will. From there, at the level of the arts, it is only the intention of the artist that counts. With increasing subjectivization, the figure of the artist and his sensitivity will prevail over any rational approach.

== Resilience in art ==
Resilience in art tends to restore the foundations of art on the beauty and restore art to unity.

- In the division of the perception between objective and subjective resilience opposes a joint operation. The beauty in the work is perceived objectively, it is the first fraction of the second where the spectator is in front of the work, then intervenes the subjective judgment in relation to the experience of this one. We now benefit from new knowledge in neurobiology which studies by medical imaging the behavior of the brain in relation to the beauty and where actually we can record these two times in which intervenes in turn the neocortex and the archaic brain. Moreover, every individual instantly recognizes the beautiful as such, which encourages the idea of the beauty based on the structures of the world (see Pythagoras, Influence on art and architecture). Follows the judgment "I like, I do not like" . The indistinction of these two times certainly favored the idea of beauty as a subjective taste. This double factor is in action also during the creation by the artist. On the one hand, it takes into account his experience, his way of seeing the world, his knowledge and intuitions, but also his capacity to capture and restore the world around him. To this is added the quality of elaboration and structuring of the work with the same harmony found in nature.
- Where contemporary art relies solely on the intention of the artist, resilience sets the artist's responsibility to the community, because art is a receiver of the "image" of the community and acts in parallel on the cohesion of it. Man is a social being, by nature he must live in society to exist, excessive individualism is impossible, these two facets must be harmoniously combined.
- Theoretically, instead of a split approach, resilience is a systemic approach. At the level of practice, resilience removes the discourse that clutters art productions and focuses on the development of the work.
- Considering that the quality of a work of art is objectively identifiable, resilience in art rules out random, purely gestural, unsightly, conceptual or only decorative productions. A work of art consists of aesthetic regime and ethical regime. We can rationally judge the aesthetic quality of the work and we can apprehend it by our sensitivity in its "legible" part, in what it "speaks" or what it evokes.
- Resilience relegates the ephemeral art to the game or the show and opts for the work that projects itself in the long term. One of the reasons is its formative nature.
- At the formal level, resilience requires the diversity of expressions in place of contemporary art production, which for decades has finally generated instantly recognizable images as "contemporary art" and finished in a new academicism rejecting any other form of art as obsolete.

All cultures generate images of themselves through art images, but not all art images are works of art. Contemporary art imposing itself as current art is perhaps the image of ours, but resilience is essential when it comes to its quality as art.

== Bibliography ==
- Alfred Gell, Art and Agency, Oxford, Clarendon Press, 1998
- Clement Greenberg, La peinture moderniste, in : Charles Harrisson and Paul Wood éd, Art en Théorie, 1900-1990, Hazan, Paris, 1997.
- Edgar Morin, La Nature de la nature (t. 1), Le Seuil, Nouvelle édition, coll. Points, 1981
- Edgar Morin, Sur l'esthétique, Edition Robert Laffont, 2016
- Jürgen Habermas, Theory of Communicative Action, Boston, Beacon Press, translated by Thomas McCarthy, 1984, ISBN 978-0807014011.
- Jack Goody, Representations and Contradictions. Ambivalence Towards Images, Theatre, Fiction, Relics and Sexuality, Blackwell Publishers, 1997.
- Mikel Dufrenne, Phénoménologie de l’expérience esthétique, PUF, Paris, 1953, ISBN 978-2130588795
- Pierre Lemarquis, L'Empathie esthétique, Odile Jacob, 2015, ISBN 978-2738132536
- Alessio Fransoni, Political Theory of Art, Academia Verlag, 2024, ISBN 978-3-98572-161-0
- Ksenia Milicevic, Résilience en art et art-thérapie pour la résilience, Edilivre, 2020, ISBN 9 782414 459360
