= Wills Glasspiegel =

American artist (born 1982)

Wills Glasspiegel (born November 23, 1982) is an American filmmaker, artist, scholar and community organizer from Chicago. Dr. Glasspiegel has spent several years working alongside electronic musicians and dancers from Sierra Leone (bubu music), South Africa (Shangaan electro) and Chicago (Footwork (genre)). In 2017, he co-founded the arts and racial justice nonprofit, Open the Circle. He has produced public radio segments for All Things Considered and Morning Edition, and was recognized as a co-recipient of a Peabody Award in 2014 for his contributions to the public radio program Afropop Worldwide. Wills' collaborations have been featured in a variety of publications including CNN, FADER Magazine, Dazed Magazine, Pitchfork, New York Times, Wall Street Journal, The Guardian, and Chicago Tribune. He worked from 2016-2023 as an artist and filmmaker with The Era Footwork Crew, including as creative director for The Era's touring performance,IN THE WURKZ, a show that won the National Dance Project award in 2019 from the New England Foundation for the Arts. Glasspiegel's work has been recognized with prizes from the MacArthur Foundation, the Field Foundation, the National Endowment for the Arts, and the City of Chicago. His films and installations have screened at Stony Island Arts Bank, the Museum of Contemporary Art Chicago, the Walker Art Center, Minneapolis Institute of Arts, MANA Contemporary, Shibuya crossing in Japan (Neo Shibuya), and several times with Art on the Mart in Chicago.

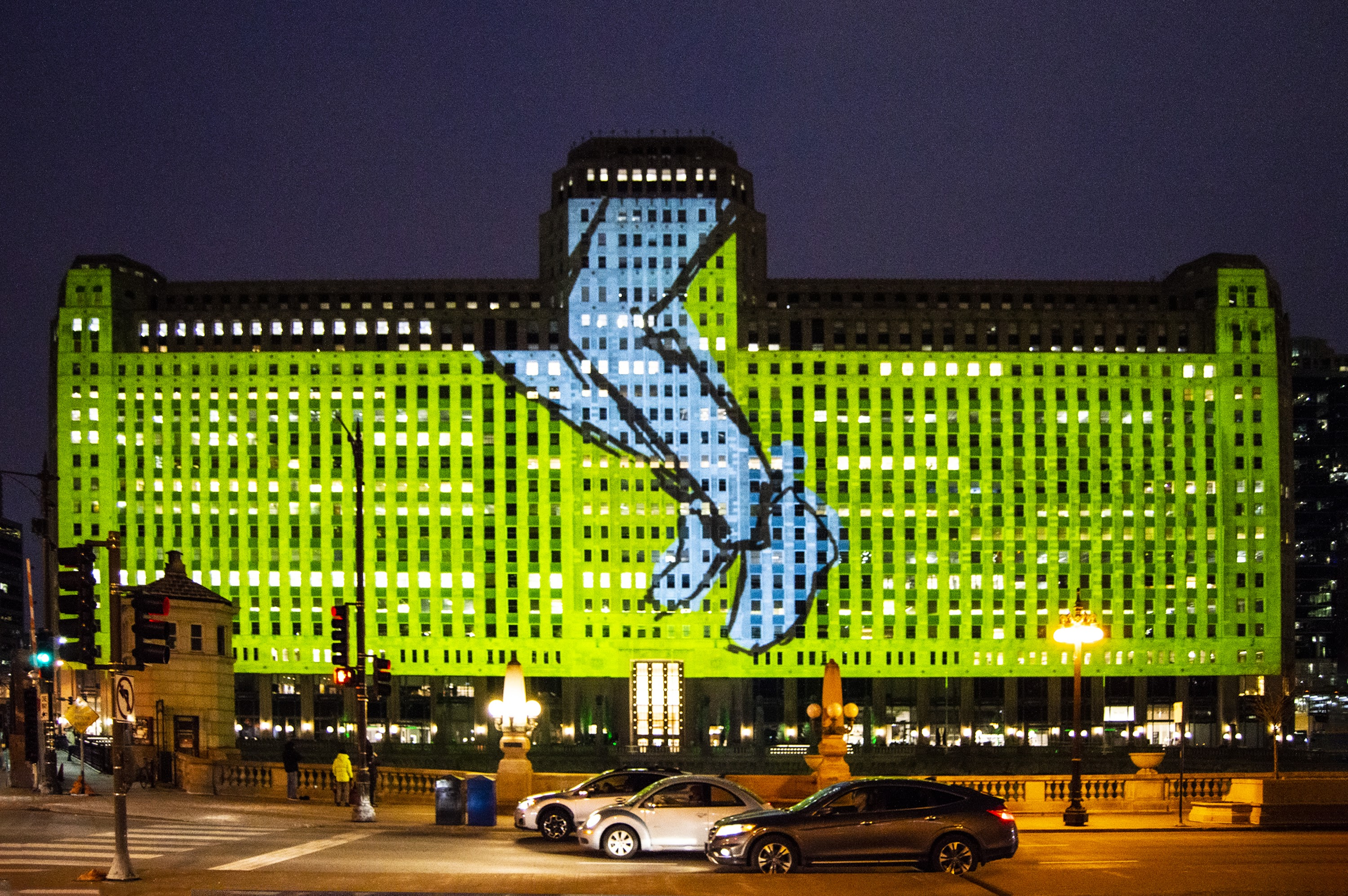
Footnotes, a projection directed by Glasspiegel, opening at Art on theMART in 2021

== Public work ==
=== Film ===
Year	Title	Credited as			
Year	Title	Director	Editor	Cinematographer	Producer
2011	Kenya ftr. Solange and Chris Taylor			check	check
2013	Making Tracks: Chicago Footwork	check	check	check	check
2014	Icy Lake	check	check	check	
2014	Vogue Knights	check	check	check	
2015	Bang'n on King Drive	check	check	check	
2015	Rural Roots: From Giyani to New York				check
2015	Urban Beats: Atteridgeville to Brooklyn				check
2016	Dance to the Bubu	check	check	check	
2016	Meet the Era	check	check	check	
2016	Freetown Masks	check	check	check	
2017	Sabanoh	check	check	check	
2018	I Am the Queen	check	check	check	
2020	Eschecagou	check	check	check	
2021	Footnotes	check	check	check	

=== Radio ===
Year	Title
2011	Midwest Electric: The Story of Chicago House and Detroit Techno
2011	Sierra Leone: Celebration, War and Healing
2012	Nollywood: Nigeria's Mirror
2014	Proving the Bubu Myth: Janka Nabay, War and Witchcraft in Sierra Leone

=== Publications ===
Year	Title
2014	Footwork: 10 Essential Tracks (Pitchfork)
2018	My Friendship with Ahmed Janka Nabay, Genius of Bubu (NPR Music)
2020	Kicking a Leg
2021	"Dancing the Wall of Respect" (in Fleeting Monuments to the Wall of Respect, edited by Romi Crawford)
2022	Each One, Teach One: Footwork in Minnesota
2022	Darlene Blackburn, Dancer of Time
