= Dark Energy (album) =

Studio album by Jlin
- Released: March 24, 2015
- Genres: Footwork; IDM
- Length: 39:02
- Label: Planet Mu
- Producer: Jerrilynn Patton

Jlin chronology
Dark Energy (2015)	Free Fall (2015)

Dark Energy is the debut album by American electronic music producer Jlin, released in 2015 by Planet Mu. It received acclaim from critics and was named the best album of 2015 by The Quietus and The Wire.

== Critical reception ==
Professional ratings
Aggregate scores
Source	Rating
AnyDecentMusic?	7.2/10
Metacritic	86/100
Review scores
Source	Rating
AllMusic	4/5 stars
The Guardian	4/5 stars
Juice	4/5 stars
The List	2/5
Pitchfork	8.5/10
Resident Advisor	4.1/5
Tiny Mix Tapes	4.5/5
Vice	6/10

Dark Energy received universal acclaim from music critics. AllMusic called it "simply one of the most compelling debut albums of 2015," describing it as "tense, thrilling, and a bit frightening." The Quietus wrote that "In its breadth of ambition and stunningly realised sounds, Dark Energy delivers more than just a new twist on an established style [...] it maps out an inspiring and tantalising glimpse of electronic music's future." Referring to the producer's roots in the Chicago dance style known as footwork, The Guardian wrote: "Jlin is an artist who belongs to her genre, but has an eye on where it could go next." Resident Advisor stated that "Jlin has plenty to say, and she has a remarkably strong and distinctive voice with which to say it."

The Quietus and The Wire both named Dark Energy the best album of 2015, while Fact named it the year's seventh best album. Pitchfork placed Dark Energy at number 40 on its year-end list of the best albums of 2015, and in 2017, the site placed the album at number 35 on its list of "The 50 Best IDM Albums of All Time".

== Track listing ==
All tracks are written by Jerrilynn Patton.

No.	Title	Length
1.	"Black Ballet"	3:39
2.	"Unknown Tongues"	3:27
3.	"Guantanamo"	4:23
4.	"Erotic Heat"	4:24
5.	"Black Diamond"	2:07
6.	"Mansa Musa"	3:38
7.	"Infrared (Bagua)"	4:08
8.	"Ra"	3:07
9.	"Expand"	3:44
10.	"So High"	3:01
11.	"Abnormal Restriction"	3:24

== Personnel ==
Credits adapted from liner notes.

- Jerrilynn Patton – composition, production
- Fabian Harb – sleeve design
- Holly Herndon – vocals on "Expand"
- Spencer Shakespeare – cover photograph
