= Paper Towns (soundtrack) =

2015 soundtrack album

Paper Towns (Music from the Motion Picture)

Soundtrack album by Various artists
- Released: July 10, 2015
- Recorded: 2014–15
- Genre: Soundtrack
- Length: 60:51
- Label: Atlantic
- Producer: Kevin Weaver; Season Kent; Marty Bowen (exec.); Wyck Godfrey (exec.)

Paper Towns (Music from the Motion Picture) is the soundtrack to the 2015 film of the same name. It was released by Atlantic Records on July 10, 2015, consisting of new and previously released material from Twin Shadow, Santigold, Grouplove, Haim, Vampire Weekend, The Mountain Goats, The War on Drugs, Galantis as well as Nat Wolff and his brother Alex.

== Background ==
Jake Schreier, the film's director, claimed the music selection was a long process picking out music that fits perfectly with each scene, admitting that music supervisor Season Kent would send mixtapes to the crew while filming so that they could pick the music that they liked the most. Kent, who previously worked as supervisor in The Fault in Our Stars (2014) also based on Green's novel, claimed although the story and vibe were being different, the themes are nearly identicals, where he "wanted to continue where we left off and make sure we stayed in the same realm". Schrier further recalled that after filming completed, Nat had written a song (later deciphered as "Look Outside") which he recorded it in his iPhone and sent it to the crew members which they liked it. The film version was performed by Nat and Alex Wolff.

Green further called the soundtrack as the "perfect summer album" complimenting the artists and music selections. He further called Schreier recollecting on how his favorite track "Used to Haunt" by The Mountain Goats being included in the playlist and said that "There are a lot of times in the movie where the music does some of the stuff that hopefully happens in the book that you can’t fit into the movie, because movies are much shorter than books. I like the way the music carries some of the emotion." Green also insisted selecting particular tracks from that band, as the book based on had references to the songs.

Actress Halston Sage felt that before the cast had the soundtrack, they need to find a way to be transported themselves back to their high school days, with The Killers' "Human" (2008) really took them back to their characters. The song was released during their high school time and brought them back to that mindset and age.

== Track listing ==
Paper Towns (Music from the Motion Picture)
No.	Title	Writer(s)	Artist(s)	Length
1.	"Radio"	Amanda Lucille Warner; Jesse Shatkin; Santi White	Santigold	3:09
2.	"To the Top"	George Lewis Jr.	Twin Shadow	3:16
3.	"Search Party"	Al Shuckburgh; Tommie Lee McLoughlin	Sam and Samantha Kay Bruno	3:48
4.	"Swingin' Party"	Paul Westerberg	Kindness	3:57
5.	"Great Summer"	Vance Joy	Vance Joy	3:42
6.	"Taxi Cab"	Ezra Koenig	Vampire Weekend	3:56
7.	"Lost It to Trying" (Paper Towns mix)	Ryan Lott	Son Lux	4:05
8.	"My Type"	Aaron Dale Moore Sharp; Alexander Leonard Jackson; Chondrak Lerdamornpong; Greg Erwin	Saint Motel	3:25
9.	"Runaway (U & I)" (Svidden & Jarly Remix)	Anton Rundberg; Cathy Dennis; Christian Karlsson; Jimmy Koitzsch; Julia Karlsson; Linus Eklöw	Galantis	3:22
10.	"Falling"	Alana Haim; Danielle Haim; Este Haim; Morgan Nagler	Haim	4:19
11.	"No Drama Queen"	Grouplove	Grouplove	2:43
12.	"Moments"	Isaac Franco; Sean Guerin	De Lux	6:11
13.	"Be Mine"	Alice Boman; Tom Malmros	Alice Boman	3:26
14.	"Used to Haunt"	John Darnielle	The Mountain Goats	2:43
15.	"Burning"	Adam Granofsky	The War on Drugs	5:45
16.	"Look Outside"	Nat Wolff	Nat and Alex Wolff	2:55
Total length:				60:51

== Reception ==
Marcy Donelson of AllMusic called it as "viable alt-music soundtrack for its time". Keylee Paz of Afterglow wrote "the Paper Towns soundtrack constructs a new sense of nostalgia for young adults by combining the different kinds of indie styles that dominated the musical landscape of the 2010s. While the tracks are stand-alone, together they create a cohesive playlist that exhibits an eclectic yet mellow overview of life and love. The curation of the soundtrack embodies the warm-hearted tone of its characters, and highlights the obstacles faced by each of them. The movie itself might not be super impressive, but the soundtrack is worth the listen as it is a great way to revisit the songs that embody the indie-dance genre."

Critic based at The National News wrote "As soundtracks go, Paper Towns comes close to perfection in the job it performs. It works as the optimum seasoning to the main dish — the movie — but its enchanting composition also works as a stand-alone amuse-bouche." Siena Yates of Stuff wrote "Even if you have no clue what Paper Towns is about, or no intention of watching the film, this soundtrack is definitely still worth fair consideration on its own."

== Credits ==
Credits adapted from AllMusic.

- A&R – Kevin Weaver, Sam Riback
- A&R administration (Atlantic Records) – Aryanna Platt, Craig Rosen
- Art direction, design – Matthew Meiners, Virgilio Tzaj
- Soundtrack co-ordinator (Twentieth Century Fox) – Joann Orgel
- Soundtrack co-ordinator – Sara Chronert
- Executive album producers – Marty Bowen, Wyck Godfrey
- Business affairs (Twentieth Century Fox) – Tom Cavanaugh
- Business and legal affairs (Atlantic Records) – Cindy Zaplachinski
- Music clearance (Twentieth Century Fox) – Ellen Ginsburg
- Soundtrack album clearance (Twentieth Century Fox) – Jessie Roberts
- Liner notes – Jake Schreier
- Executive in charge of music (Twentieth Century Fox) – Danielle Diego
- Music management (Twentieth Century Fox) – Areli Quirarte
- Mastered By – Justin Smith
- Soundtrack director – Joseph Khoury
- Soundtrack album producers – Kevin Weaver, Season Kent
- Marketing (Atlantic Records) – David Grant
- Packaging and production – Josh Skubel
- Music production supervisor (Twentieth Century Fox) – Rebecca Morellato
- Music supervisor (Twentieth Century Fox) – Patrick Houlihan

== Chart performance ==
Chart (2015)	Peak position
Australian Albums (ARIA)	44
UK Soundtrack Albums (OCC)	1
US Billboard 200	89
US Soundtrack Albums (Billboard)	6

== Original score ==
Paper Towns (Original Motion Picture Score)

Film score by Son Lux
- Released: July 31, 2015
- Genre: Film score
- Length: 32:49
- Label: Fox Music
- Producer: Ryan Lott

Son Lux chronology
The Disappearance of Eleanor Rigby (2014)	Paper Towns (2015)	Everything Everywhere All At Once (2022)

The film score is composed by Son Lux's frontman Ryan Lott, whose compositions were released into a separate album by Fox Music on July 31, 2015.

Track listing
No.	Title	Length
1.	"She Became A Mystery"	1:21
2.	"Forget The Miracle Ever Happened"	1:45
3.	"We Bring The Rain Down On Our Enemies"	3:26
4.	"The Way You Should Feel Your Whole Life"	1:42
5.	"You Will Hardly Know Who I Am Or What I Mean"	2:53
6.	"She Wouldn't Be Found Until She Wanted To Be"	1:02
7.	"The Detroitiest Part Of Orlando"	2:17
8.	"You Will Go To The Paper Towns And You Will Never Come Back"	1:59
9.	"You Have To Get Lost Before You Find Yourself"	3:36
10.	"I Had To Imagine My Way Into Her Map"	2:07
11.	"You Like Dragons?"	2:13
12.	"Agloe"	2:06
13.	"I Don't Even Know Me"	2:36
14.	"A Paper Town For A Paper Girl"	2:05
15.	"The Myth We Made You Out To Be"	1:41
Total length:		32:49
