= Everyone's a Guru Now =

2023 single by Saint Motel

Single by Saint Motel

from the album Saint Motel & the Symphony in the Sky
- Released: May 5, 2023
- Genre: Indie pop; pop rock; alternative rock
- Length: 3:21
- Label: Elektra Records
- Songwriter: A. J. Jackson
- Producers: A. J. Jackson; Aaron Sharp

Saint Motel singles chronology
"It's All Happening" (2021)	"Everyone's a Guru Now" (2023)	"Fine Wine" (2023)

Lyric video
- "Everyone's a Guru Now" on YouTube

Music video
- "Everyone's a Guru Now" on YouTube

"Everyone's a Guru Now" is a song by American indie pop band Saint Motel. It was released through Elektra Records on May 5, 2023, as the lead single for their fourth studio album, Saint Motel & the Symphony in the Sky (2025). The song was written by vocalist A. J. Jackson and co-produced with lead guitarist Aaron Sharp. Utilizing upbeat pop rock instrumentation, it lyrically focuses on superficial knowledge created by people claiming expertise. A lyric and music video were released for the song later in the year.

== Production ==
In 2022, Saint Motel's vocalist A. J. Jackson composed a slow piano demo with a lighthearted tone. Inspired by his peers suddenly becoming self-proclaimed experts in various fields, Jackson wrote tongue-in-cheek lyrics for the song. The band developed this into "Everyone's a Guru Now", incorporating an orchestra, brass section, and choir. He then worked with recording engineer Joe Napolitano to repeatedly tweak the song, often making adjustments that were scrapped or marginal to the track. Production was concluded by decluttering the composition, declared by Jackson to be "a matter of what elements we could take away from the song and still let it stand".

== Release ==
On April 24, 2023, Saint Motel began the Awards Show Tour at Metro in Chicago, Illinois. "Everyone's a Guru Now" made its live debut during the show as an unreleased song, and was subsequently included in setlists for the rest of the tour. On May 12, a lyric video was released for the track. It features various infomercials recorded and edited by Jackson with Napolitano, intended to mimic late-night television. A music video directed by Gara was released for "Everyone's a Guru Now" on July 11, focusing on a man who offers surreal solutions to various people.

Michael Major of antiMusic complimented the song's grandiose spirit, highlighting Jackson's vocal performance during choruses. Maggie Fewkes of Lightning 100 praised similar qualities of the song, additionally enjoying its "swinging brass". Kevin Bronson of Buzzbands LA described the song as bouncy and elegant, appreciating its resemblance to Saint Motel's previous work. Mónica Fuentes Tuesta of Worked Music rated the single a 7 out of 10, commending its organic instrumentation and lyrical criticism of social customs.

== Personnel ==
Saint Motel

- A. J. Jackson – lead vocals, guitar, piano, production
- Aaron Sharp – lead guitar, production
- Dak Lerdamornpong – bass
- Greg Erwin – drums

Additional personnel

- Ruairi O'Flaherty – mastering engineer
- Lars Stalfors - mixing engineer
- Joe Napolitano – additional percussion, additional vocals, recording engineer
- Nathaniel Wolkstein – additional strings
- Jillinda Palmer – additional vocals
- Lucy Riva – additional vocals
