= Paper Towns =

Paper Towns or Papertown may refer to:

- Paper Towns (novel), a 2008 novel by John Green
- Paper Towns (film), a 2015 film based on the novel
- Paper Towns (soundtrack), the soundtrack to the film
- Paper towns or phantom settlements, settlements that appear on maps but do not actually exist
- Paper township, a type of Ohio township
- Papertown, a 2026 documentary about Canton, North Carolina

== See also ==
- Municipal deannexation in the United States
