= The Original Motion Picture Soundtrack =

Studio album by Saint Motel
- Released: June 25, 2021
- Length: 53:02
- Label: Elektra
- Producer: A. J. Jackson; Mark Needham; Jayson DeZuzio; Mads; Alex Metric; Joe Napolitano

Saint Motel chronology
saintmotelevision (2016)	The Original Motion Picture Soundtrack (2021)	Saint Motel & the Symphony in the Sky (2025)

The Original Motion Picture Soundtrack is the third studio album by American indie pop band Saint Motel. It was released on June 25, 2021, by Elektra Records. The album was preceded by the release of two extended plays composed of songs that would eventually end up on the full album: The Original Motion Picture Soundtrack: Part 1 and The Original Motion Picture Soundtrack: Part 2, released in 2019 and 2020 respectively.

== Singles ==
"Van Horn" was released to radio as a single upon the release of Part 1, and an accompanying music video was released on February 12, 2020. "A Good Song Never Dies" and "Preach" were released as singles to promote Part 2 in 2020. "It's All Happening" was released in May 2021 in advance of the upcoming release of the full album. A music video for it was released later that month.

== Track listing ==
No.	Title	Writer(s)	Producer(s)	Length
1.	"Old Soul"	A. J. Jackson; Andrew Cohen	A. J. Jackson; Mark Needham	3:29
2.	"Sisters"	Jackson; Morton Craft; Selma Craft	Jackson; Needham	3:16
3.	"Van Horn"	Jackson	Jackson; Needham	2:41
4.	"Diane Mozart"	Aaron Sharp; Jackson	Jackson; Needham	3:12
5.	"Save Me"	Jackson	Jackson; Needham	4:05
6.	"Make Me Feel Like"	Jackson; Tommy Leonard	Jackson; Needham	3:59
7.	"Slow Dance"	Jackson	Jackson; Needham	3:30
8.	"Preach"	Jackson; Grant Michaels; Sam Hollander	Jackson; Jayson DeZuzio; Mads	3:04
9.	"A Good Song Never Dies"	Sharp; Jackson	Jackson; Needham	3:21
10.	"The Moment"	Sharp; Jackson	Jackson; Needham	4:06
11.	"Snake Charmer"	Jackson	Jackson; Needham	3:55
12.	"Bullet"	Jackson; Kevin Griffin	Jackson; Needham	3:23
13.	"It's All Happening"	Jackson	Jackson; Alex Metric	3:00
14.	"Origami"	Sharp; Jackson	Jackson; Needham	3:59
15.	"No Cares"	Jackson; Sharp; Greg Erwin; Dak Lerdamornpong	Jackson; Joe Napolitano	4:02
Total length:				53:02
