= Saintmotelevision =

saintmotelevision

Studio album by Saint Motel
- Released: October 21, 2016
- Genre: Indie pop
- Length: 31:44
- Label: Elektra
- Producers: AJ Jackson; Tim Pagnotta; Lars Stalfors; Frederik Thaae

Saint Motel chronology
My Type (2014)	saintmotelevision (2016)	The Original Motion Picture Soundtrack (2021)

Singles from saintmotelevision
- 1. "Move" Released: August 12, 2016; 2. "Happy Accidents" Released: Unknown; 3. "Born Again" Released: May 31, 2017; 4. "Destroyer" Released: October 5, 2017

Saintmotelevision (stylized in all lowercase) is the second studio album by American indie pop band Saint Motel. It was released on October 21, 2016, by Elektra Records.

== Singles ==
The album's first single, "Move", was released on August 12, 2016. "Move" is featured on the soundtrack of FIFA 17.

A music video was made for "You Can Be You" and released on September 15, 2016, while a video for "Born Again" was released on October 14, 2016, and a Spotify single followed on March 1, 2017.

Professional ratings
Review scores
Source	Rating
AllMusic	3/5 stars

== Track listing ==
All tracks are written by A. J. Jackson, Gregory Erwin, Dak Lerdamornpong, and Aaron Sharp, except where noted.

No.	Title	Writer(s)	Producer(s)	Length
1.	"Move"		Lars Stalfors	3:09
2.	"Getaway"		Stalfors	3:02
3.	"Destroyer"		Tim Pagnotta	3:12
4.	"Born Again"		Pagnotta	3:27
5.	"Sweet Talk"		Stalfors	3:12
6.	"You Can Be You"		Stalfors	2:58
7.	"For Elise"	Jackson; Tommy Leonard	Pagnotta	3:23
8.	"Local Long Distance Relationship (LA2NY)"		Pagnotta	3:21
9.	"Slow Motion"		Pagnotta	2:57
10.	"Happy Accidents"	Jackson; Frederik Thaae; Jordan Rand Miller; Tom Peyton	Thaae; Jackson	3:03

== Personnel ==
Credits for saintmotelevision adapted from Tidal.

=== Saint Motel ===
- A/J Jackson – lead vocals, guitar, piano, album artwork
- Aaron Sharp – lead guitar
- Greg Erwin – drums
- Dak Lerdamornpong – bass

=== Additional musicians ===
- Sabrina Jasmine – background vocals (2)
- Brooke Graeff – background vocals (3)
- Tiffany Borland – background vocals (5)
- Frederik Thaae – background vocals (10)
- Tim Pagnotta – background vocals (10)
- Nathan Kersey-Wilson – saxophone (1, 5–7)
- James King – saxophone (2, 4, 8, 9)
- Vincent Dawson – trumpet (1, 5–7)
- Ronnie Blake – trumpet (2–4, 8, 9)
- Tommy Leonard – additional keyboards (7)
- Tom Peyton – trombone (10)

=== Technical ===
- Dave Cooley – mastering
- Mark Needham – mixing
- Brian Phillips – engineering
- Dave Cerminara – engineering assistance
- Matt Meiners – album artwork

== Charts ==
Chart (2016)	Peak position
Italian Albums (FIMI)	100
US Billboard 200	62
