= Voyeur (Saint Motel album) =

Studio album by Saint Motel
- Released: July 10, 2012
- Genre: Indie rock, dance-rock, power pop, funk rock
- Length: 38:44
- Label: OnThe
- Producer: Saint Motel, Eric Lilavois

Saint Motel chronology
ForPlay (2009)	Voyeur (2012)	My Type (2014)

Singles from Voyeur
- 1. "Puzzle Pieces"; 2. "Benny Goodman"; 3. "At Least I Have Nothing"; 4. "1997"

Voyeur is the debut album by American band Saint Motel, released on July 10, 2012, through On The Records. The album was recorded at the band's Los Angeles studio.

== Reception ==
Eric J. Lawrence of KCRW said of the album "They have attacked it with gusto on Voyeur, adding dynamic touches to their rock-solid core of songwriting" and that "Overall the album is a satisfying package from start to finish".

Mark Jenkins of The Washington Post reviewed the album, "Channeling British glam-pop as only a Los Angeles band can, Saint Motel makes chic and sprightly music with hints of ironic malevolence." He also said, "At times, the music can be almost too ecstatic, threatening to leave the listener behind."

== Track listing ==
No.	Title	Length
1.	"Feed Me Now"	4:23
2.	"Benny Goodman"	3:38
3.	"Puzzle Pieces"	3:51
4.	"Daydream / Wetdream / Nightmare"	5:07
5.	"1997"	4:17
6.	"Honest Feedback"	3:42
7.	"At Least I Have Nothing"	3:36
8.	"You Do It Well"	3:12
9.	"Hands Up Robert"	3:47
10.	"Stories"	4:04
11.	"Balsa Wood Bones"	4:09

== Personnel ==
- A. J. Jackson – lead vocals, guitar, piano
- Aaron Sharp – lead guitar
- Greg Erwin – drums
- Dak Lerdamornpong – bass
