= Paper Towns (film) =

Film by Jake Schreier

- Theatrical release poster
- Directed by: Jake Schreier
- Screenplay by: Scott Neustadter; Michael H. Weber
- Based on: Paper Towns by John Green
- Produced by: Wyck Godfrey; Marty Bowen
- Starring: Nat Wolff; Cara Delevingne; Halston Sage; Justice Smith; Austin Abrams
- Cinematography: David Lanzenberg
- Edited by: Jacob Craycroft; Jennifer Lame
- Music by: Ryan Lott
- Production companies: Fox 2000 Pictures; Temple Hill Entertainment
- Distributed by: 20th Century Fox
- Release date: July 24, 2015
- Running time: 109 minutes
- Country: United States
- Language: English
- Budget: $12 million
- Box office: $85.5 million

Paper Towns is a 2015 American teen comedy drama film directed by Jake Schreier from a screenplay by Scott Neustadter and Michael H. Weber, based on the 2008 novel of the same name by John Green. The film stars Nat Wolff and Cara Delevingne, with Halston Sage, Austin Abrams, and Justice Smith in supporting roles. The story follows the search by Quentin "Q" Jacobsen (Wolff) for Margo Roth Spiegelman (Delevingne), his childhood friend and object of affection. In the process, Quentin explores the relationship with his friends, including his compatibility with Margo.

Paper Towns was released in the United States on July 24, 2015, by 20th Century Fox. The film received mixed reviews from critics and grossed over $85 million worldwide against a production budget of $12 million. It was released on DVD and Blu-ray on October 20, 2015, and grossed over $9 million in total domestic video sales.

== Plot ==
Quentin Jacobsen lives across the street from his childhood friend Margo Roth Spiegelman in Jefferson Park, a subdivision of Orlando, Florida. Quentin and Margo drifted apart nine years ago after discovering the corpse of a local lawyer who killed himself after his divorce. Unbeknownst to Margo, Quentin has been infatuated with her since they became neighbors.

After reaching adolescence, Margo becomes a popular girl with an adventurous reputation at Jefferson Park High School. (Note: Named Winter Park High School in the original novel.) In contrast, Quentin is shy, unassertive, and unpopular.

One night, Margo climbs through Quentin's window and recruits him to help her enact revenge on her boyfriend, Jason Worthington, who cheated on her with her friend Rebecca Arrington. After buying supplies, Margo and Quentin pull humiliating pranks on Jason, Rebecca, and Margo's best friend Lacey Pemberton, whom she believes hid the affair from her; however, she later discovers Lacey was unaware until the prank. Quentin becomes hopeful that he can finally develop a closer relationship with Margo, and learns how to assert himself and take chances.

Margo is absent from school for the next few days; while some students begin to worry that she is missing, her parents decline to report her absence to the police, as she has run away from home several times before.

After seeing a recently attached Woody Guthrie poster on her bedroom wall, Quentin realizes that Margo deliberately left clues for him to discover where she went. Quentin and his best friends Benjamin Starling and Marcus Lincoln begin searching for other clues, bribing Margo's sister Ruthie to gain access to her room.

While at a party at Jason's house, Lacey confronts Rebecca over her betrayal of Margo and leaves in disgust. Quentin finds her in a bathroom and, through a conversation, discovers that she is intelligent and compassionate beneath her superficial exterior.

The clues lead Quentin and his friends to a gift store at an abandoned strip mall. They find a map that Margo used and discover that she has been hiding in Agloe, a paper town located in the state of New York. Quentin and his friends, including Marcus's girlfriend Angela, embark on a two-day road trip to find Margo, during which Benjamin and Lacey decide to go to prom together, and Marcus and Angela consummate their relationship.

When Margo is nowhere to be found, Quentin remains in Agloe while the others return home in time for prom. Quentin finds her on the street and confesses his love to her, but she rebuffs him, asserting that he does not even know her. She subsequently reveals that she ran away to escape her dysfunctional family and figure out who she is and explains that the clues were meant to assure Quentin that she is safe, not as an invitation for him to follow her.

Margo remains in Agloe while Quentin takes a bus home; they share a farewell kiss before he departs. Back in Orlando, Quentin spends prom with his friends, continuing to spend time with them throughout the summer after graduation and learning ambiguous stories about Margo before they all leave for college.

== Cast ==
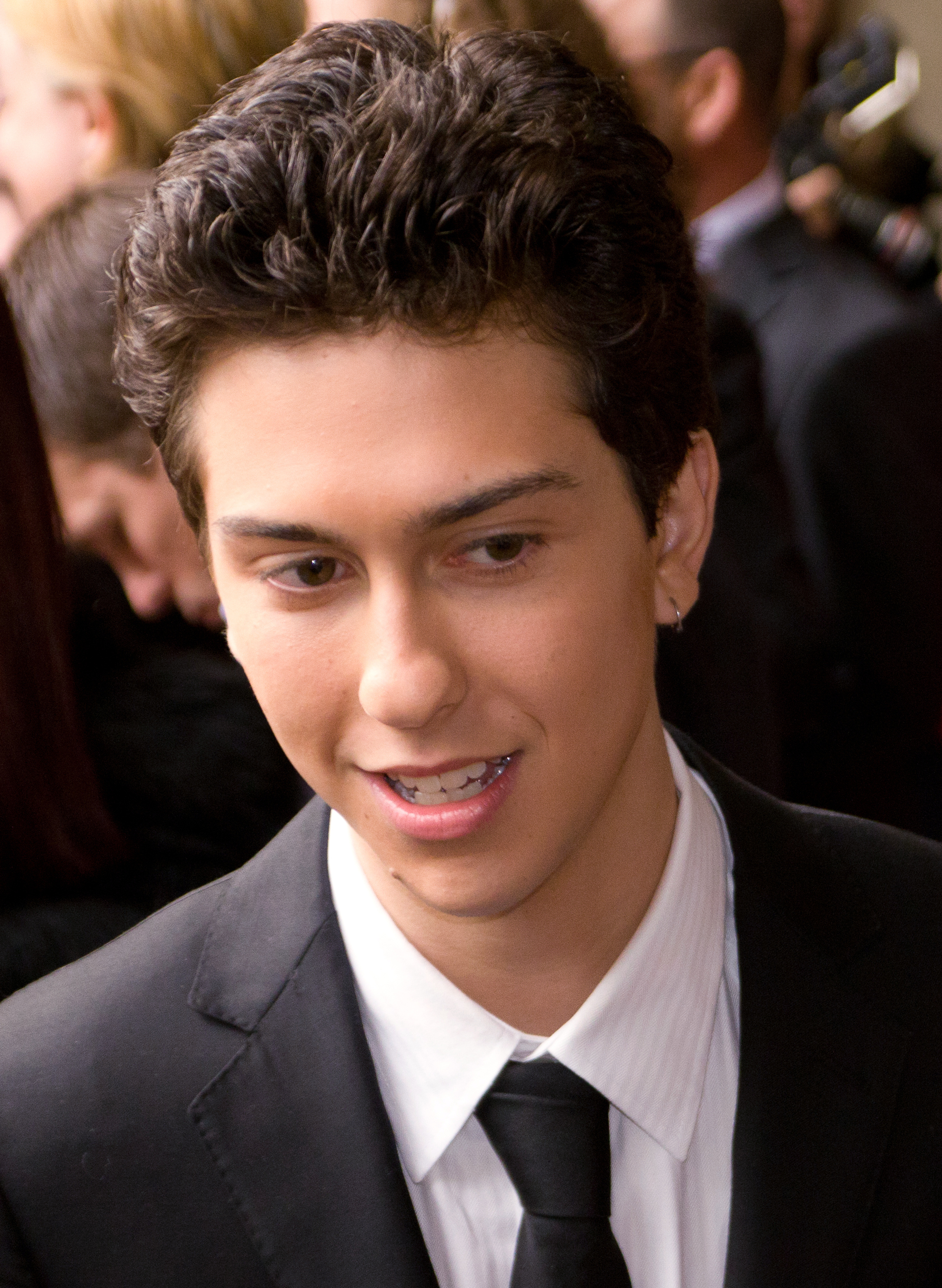
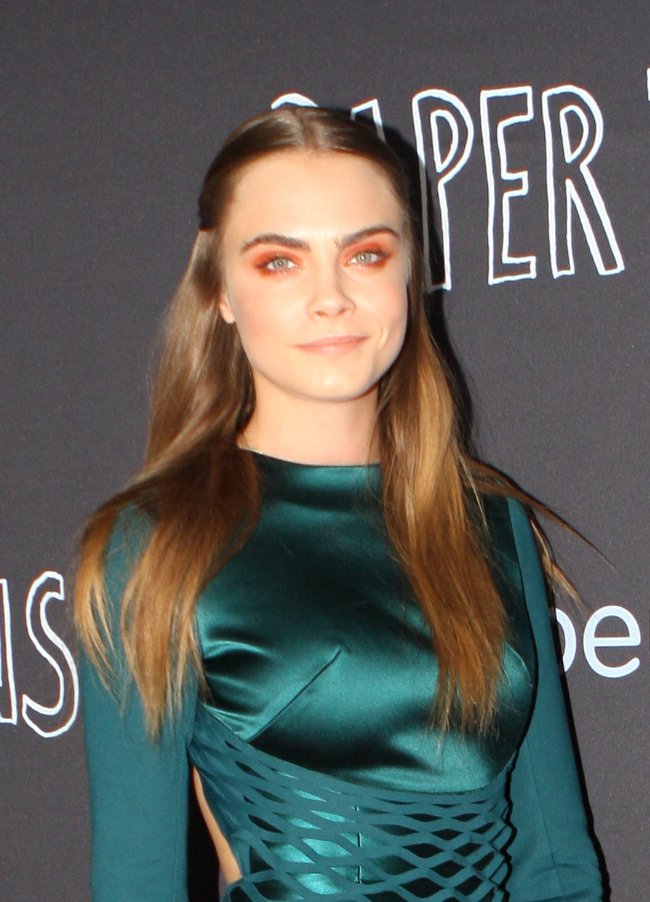
Left to right: Nat Wolff stars as Quentin "Q" Jacobsen and Cara Delevingne as Margo Roth Spiegelman in the film.
- Nat Wolff as Quentin "Q" Jacobsen, the film's lead protagonist
  - Josiah Cerio as young "Q"
- Cara Delevingne as Margo Roth Spiegelman, Quentin's childhood friend and the object of his affection
  - Hannah Alligood as young Margo
- Halston Sage as Lacey Pemberton, Margo's best friend, she later becomes one of Quentin's friends and Benjamin's prom date
- Austin Abrams as Benjamin "Ben" Starling, one of Quentin's best friends
  - Kendall McIntyre as young Ben
- Justice Smith as Marcus "Radar" Lincoln, one of Quentin's best friends
- Jaz Sinclair as Angela, Marcus's girlfriend, and prom date, who later joins Quentin's circle of friends
- Cara Buono as Connie Jacobsen, Quentin's mother
- Griffin Freeman as Jason "Jase" Worthington, Margo's former boyfriend and Quentin's nemesis
- Caitlin Carver as Rebecca "Becca" Arrington, Margo's former friend-turned-nemesis and Jason's new girlfriend
- Meg Crosbie as Ruthie Spiegelman, Margo's sister
- Susan Macke Miller as Debbie Spiegelman, Margo and Ruthie's mother
- Tom Hillmann as Josh Spiegelman, Margo and Ruthie's father
- RJ Shearer as Chuck Parson, Jason's best friend, Lacey's former boyfriend, and Quentin's nemesis
- Jim Coleman as Detective Otis Warren with the Orlando Police Department
- Lane Lovegrove as Robert Joyner, the local man whose corpse was found by Margo and Quentin after he died by suicide
- Ansel Elgort (cameo) as Mason, the convenience store clerk who is infatuated with Lacey
- Stevie Ray Dallimore as Hank Jacobsen, Quentin's father
- John Green (voice) as Dwight Arrington, Rebecca's father

== Production ==
=== Pre-production ===
The rights to the film had been optioned since at least 2008; Green wrote the first draft of the screenplay himself.

Although the novel features a scene set in SeaWorld the location was changed after the release of the CNN documentary Blackfish which was highly critical of the theme park keeping orcas. On March 24, 2014, Green announced via Twitter that Nat Wolff would be playing the protagonist Quentin "Q" Jacobsen. Cara Delevingne's casting as Margo Roth Spiegelman was announced the following September.

=== Filming ===
Although the novel is set primarily in Orlando, Florida, North Carolina's tax incentives for filmmakers made it the affordable choice for principal photography according to Green. The crew was encouraged to finish filming before December 31, 2014, the date when certain tax incentives would expire.

Principal photography began on November 3, 2014, in and around Charlotte, North Carolina, as well as partially in Downtown Orlando and concluded on December 19, 2014. On November 17–18, filming was due to take place at the Mooresville Arts Depot in Mooresville, North Carolina but due to weather conditions the schedule was moved to November 18–19, when the film was shot on location both days. Production was set to be moved to Wilmington, North Carolina on December 2 to film the high school scenes with extras, but the venue was changed and filming took place in Cabarrus County, North Carolina outside of Charlotte instead. Between December 2 through 8, the crew filmed at Central Cabarrus High School in Concord, North Carolina, which was transformed into "Jefferson Park High School". Cast members were dressed for warm weather even though it was cold.

== Release ==
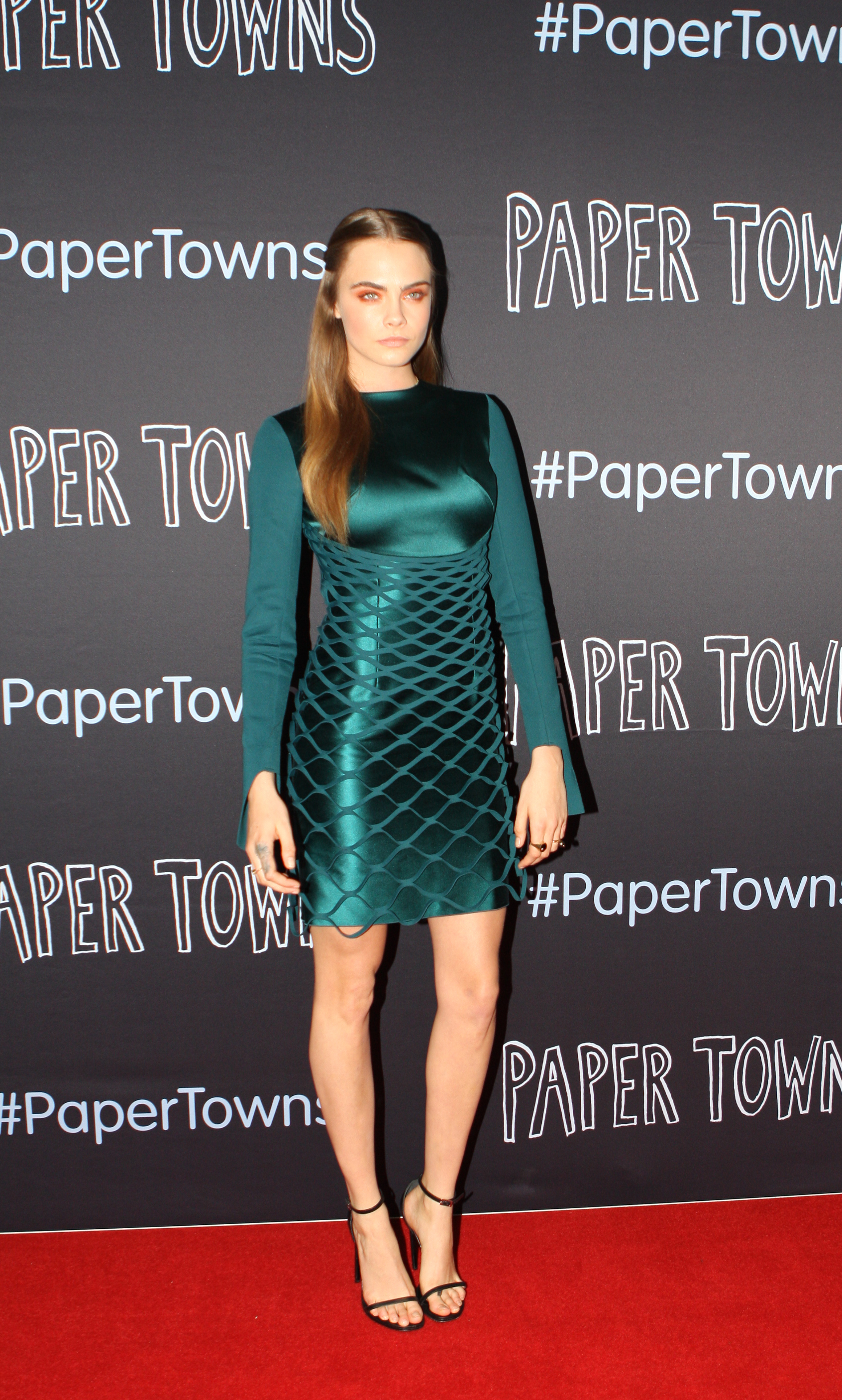
Cara Delevingne at the film's premiere.

The film was originally supposed to be released on July 31, 2015. The release date was later changed to June 19 and then to June 5, the day before the first anniversary of The Fault in Our Stars' film release. In March 2015, 20th Century Fox moved the release date to July 24, 2015, which was assigned to the release of Poltergeist. It was released on May 22 instead. To tie in with the release of the film, an extra 1.5 million paperback copies of the book were printed.

== Music ==
The soundtrack for Paper Towns consists of new and previously released material from Twin Shadow, Santigold, Grouplove, Haim, Vampire Weekend, The Mountain Goats, The War on Drugs, Galantis as well as Nat Wolff and his brother Alex. Atlantic Records' President of Film and TV, and soundtrack producer, Kevin Weaver, and music supervisor Season Kent, (both of whom worked on the soundtrack for The Fault in Our Stars in 2014) served as the soundtrack's producers.

Paper Towns – Music from the Motion Picture

Soundtrack album by Various artists
- Released: July 10, 2015
- Genre: Soundtrack
- Length: 60:51
- Label: Atlantic

Paper Towns – Music from the Motion Picture
No.	Title	Writer(s)	Original artists	Length
1.	"Radio"	Amanda Lucille Warner; Jesse Shatkin; Santi White	Santigold	3:09
2.	"To the Top"	George Lewis Jr.	Twin Shadow	3:16
3.	"Search Party"	Al Shuckburgh; Tommie Lee McLoughlin	Sam and Samantha Kay Bruno	3:48
4.	"Swingin' Party"	Paul Westerberg	Kindness	3:57
5.	"Great Summer"	Vance Joy	Vance Joy	3:42
6.	"Taxi Cab"	Ezra Koenig	Vampire Weekend	3:56
7.	"Lost It to Trying" (Paper Towns mix)	Ryan Lott	Son Lux	4:05
8.	"My Type"	Aaron Dale Moore Sharp; Alexander Leonard Jackson; Chonrak Lerdamornpong; Greg Erwin	Saint Motel	3:25
9.	"Runaway (U & I)" (Svidden & Jarly Remix)	Anton Rundberg; Cathy Dennis; Christian Karlsson; Jimmy Koitzsch; Julia Karlsson; Linus Eklöw	Galantis	3:22
10.	"Falling"	Alana Haim; Danielle Haim; Este Haim; Morgan Nagler	Haim	4:19
11.	"No Drama Queen"	Grouplove	Grouplove	2:43
12.	"Moments"	Isaac Franco; Sean Guerin	De Lux	6:11
13.	"Be Mine"	Alice Boman; Tom Malmros	Alice Boman	3:26
14.	"Used to Haunt"	John Darnielle	The Mountain Goats	2:43
15.	"Burning"	Adam Granofsky	The War on Drugs	5:45
16.	"Look Outside"	Nat Wolff	Nat and Alex Wolff	2:55
Total length:				60:51

Charts

Chart (2015)	Peak position
Australian Albums (ARIA)	44
US Billboard 200	89
US Soundtrack Albums (Billboard)	6

== Reception ==
=== Box office ===
As of October 15, 2015, Paper Towns has grossed $32 million in North America and $53.5 million in other territories for a worldwide total of $85.5 million, against a budget of $12 million.

In the United States and Canada, the film opened at 3,031 theaters on July 24, 2015, alongside two other films, Pixels and Southpaw. Box office pundits projected the film would earn around $20 million in its opening weekend, facing direct competition with Pixels and the holdover of Ant-Man and Minions. Box office analysts also noted that it could have easily over-performed and had a higher debut, if teen girls – who are its primary target – had embraced the film and word-of-mouth had gone viral. Paper Towns made $2 million from its Thursday night showings, which began at 9 p.m. at 2,500 theaters; 500 of the screens had a live-streaming event before the film's screening. It then earned $6.3 million on its opening day from 3,301 theaters. In its opening weekend, the film grossed $12.5 million and finished 6th at the box office, falling short of industry projections and earning much less than the $48 million opening weekend gross of The Fault in Our Stars, a 2014 adaption of John Green's novel of the same name.

It had a major worldwide release on July 24, 2015, in 34 markets grossing $7.9 million from 3,905 screens in 39 markets. It opened in Brazil on July 10, 2015 – the first country to release the film – and earned $2.38 million in its opening weekend, from 630 screens, debuting at third place at the Brazilian box office, behind Minions and Terminator Genisys. However, in terms of admissions, it was second behind the former film. It had notable openings in Mexico ($1.54 million) and in Australia ($1.53 million). It was released in 18 additional countries in late July and early August, including Germany, Belgium, and the Netherlands.

It was released on Blu-ray and DVD on October 20, 2015, and grossed over $9 million in total domestic video sales.

=== Critical response ===
Paper Towns received mixed reviews from film critics. On the review aggregator website Rotten Tomatoes, 58% of 138 critics' reviews are positive, with an average rating of 5.8/10. The website's consensus reads: "Paper Towns isn't as deep or moving as it wants to be, yet it's still earnest, well-acted, and thoughtful enough to earn a place in the hearts of teen filmgoers of all ages." Metacritic, which uses a weighted average, assigned the film a score of 56 out of 100, based on 34 critics, indicating "mixed or average" reviews. In CinemaScore polls conducted during its opening weekend, cinema audiences gave the film an average grade of "B+" on an A+ to F scale.

=== Accolades ===
Award	Category	Recipient(s)	Result	Ref(s)
Teen Choice Awards	Choice Summer Movie		Won	
Teen Choice Awards	Choice Summer Movie Star: Male	Nat Wolff	Nominated	
Teen Choice Awards	Choice Summer Movie Star: Female	Cara Delevingne	Won	
Teen Choice Awards	Choice Movie: Breakout Star	Cara Delevingne	Won	
Young Artist Awards	Best Performance in a Feature Film	Hannah Alligood	Nominated	
