= The Greatest Hits (soundtrack) =

2024 soundtrack albums

The soundtrack for the 2023 science fiction romantic drama film The Greatest Hits directed by Ned Benson for Searchlight Pictures, starring Lucy Boynton, Justin H. Min, David Corenswet and Austin Crute, are two musical projects produced by Hollywood Records.

The first album, The Greatest Hits (Original Soundtrack), featured a collection of specific songs handpicked by Benson for the film, and featured artists such as Jamie xx, Roxy Music, Nelly Furtado, Peggy Lee amongst others. The second album, The Greatest Hits (Original Score), consists of a score composed by Ryan Lott. Both the albums were released day-and-date, with its streaming premiere on Hulu.

== Production ==
The soundtrack consisted of songs which were curated from Benson's musical selections included in the script written during the film's pre-production. Benson associated with music supervisor Mary Ramos, on curating specific songs with the stipulated budget allocated for music rights and also appropriate to the situation and narrative, thereby becoming a conscious process.

According to Benson, most of the songs lyrically give subtext to the film's story and the situations revolving around the characters, citing "Don't Push It Don't Force It" by Leon Haywood, "Make Me Believe In You" by Patti Jo and "This is the Day" by The The (1983)—which is not included in the soundtrack. He initially wanted "It's Gonna Be Lonely" from Prince's eponymous studio album released in 1979 and "Can We Come Together" by The Trammps but excluded them due to budget and logistic issues.

Ryan Lott composed the film score, in his second collaboration with Benson on The Disappearance of Eleanor Rigby (2013) whose band Son Lux (Lott was the principal member) worked on the original music. According to Lott, Benson was advised to create a montage of sound that begins with the principal characters. This resulted him to replace the 20th Century Fanfare in the Searchlight Pictures logo with Lott's score. Further he was advised to create a sonic overture that provides the sound of Los Angeles with orchestral and ambient music while also recreate them within a 40-second cue that starts in the beginning. The incidental underscore provided for the film were less than 30 minutes in length. Besides composing the score, he also wrote and composed the original song "Never Lost" and co-performed it with Nelly Furtado. The song featured in the film's end credits.

== Albums ==
=== The Greatest Hits (Original Soundtrack) ===
The Greatest Hits (Original Soundtrack)

Soundtrack album / compilation album by various artists
- Released: April 12, 2024
- Genre: Pop; R&B
- Length: 1:26:16
- Label: Hollywood
- Compiler: Ned Benson; Mary Ramos

Hollywood Records announced the soundtrack on March 15, 2024 which consisted of 27 songs in the album. It was released on April 12, 2024, in conjunction with the streaming release. In addition to the digital release, the album was also launched in a double LP record.

==== Track listing ====
The order of the track list is based on the physical version of the album, which is the same as the digital version. The tracks "Don't Push It, Don't Force It", "Make Me Believe in You" and "Next to You", were not included in the Spotify version of the album, while all the tracks are featured in Apple Music.

Side A
No.	Title	Artist(s)	Length
1.	"Block It Out"	Ryan Lott	0:34
2.	"Loud Places"	Jamie xx, Romy Madley Croft	4:43
3.	"Gap in the Clouds"	Yellow Days	4:40
4.	"Music Sounds Better with You"	Neil Frances	3:18
5.	"Heybb!"	Binki	2:28
6.	"Powa"	Tune-Yards	5:03
7.	"New Goodbye"	Lott	0:45
Total length:			21:31

Side B
No.	Title	Artist(s)	Length
8.	"Feel Again"	Lott	0:51
9.	"To Turn You On" (Disco Pusher remix)	Roxy Music, Pusher	6:56
10.	"Running"	Helado Negro	4:24
11.	"New Romance"	Beach House	4:12
12.	"I'm Like a Bird"	Nelly Furtado	4:03
13.	"Setting the Night on Fire"	Lott	1:13
Total length:			21:39

Side C
No.	Title	Artist(s)	Length
14.	"Don't Push It, Don't Force It"	Leon Haywood	5:24
15.	"Make Me Believe in You"	Patti Jo	3:43
16.	"Ohh I Love It (Love Break)" (Dimitri from Paris DJ friendly classic re-edit)	Salsoul Orchestra, Dimitri	5:27
17.	"Feel the Music"	Hifi Sean feat. Celeda	2:47
18.	"Next to You" (Marcy Rising The Greatest Hits Edit)	Heidi Lawden, Locussolus	3:59
Total length:			21:20

Side D
No.	Title	Artist(s)	Length
19.	"Never Lost"	Furtado, Lott	2:45
20.	"Play It On My Radio"	Niki & the Dove	4:32
21.	"Me and My Shadow" (2003 remaster)	Peggy Lee	3:07
22.	"Alternate World (Alternate Life)"	Kishi Bashi, Son Lux	4:10
23.	"Too Easy to Return"	Lott	1:05
24.	"Memories of Max"	Lott	1:22
25.	"Silent Disco"	Lott	2:04
26.	"Thank You So Much for This"	Lott	1:27
27.	"New Hello"	Lott	1:14
Total length:			21:46

=== The Greatest Hits (Original Score) ===
The Greatest Hits (Original Score)

Film score by various artists
- Released: April 12, 2024
- Recorded: 2023–2024
- Genre: Film score
- Length: 24:38
- Label: Hollywood
- Producer: Ryan Lott

Hans Zimmer chronology
Single Drunk Female (2022)	The Greatest Hits (2024)

The original score album was released on April 12, 2024. It featured nine of Lott's score cues that were previously released in the soundtrack, along with eight other cues from the score album.

==== Track listing ====
No.	Title	Length
1.	"Block It Out"	0:35
2.	"Memories Of Max"	1:22
3.	"First Hello"	1:56
4.	"Too Easy To Return"	1:06
5.	"Feel Again"	0:52
6.	"Setting the Night on Fire"	1:14
7.	"Roadside Kiss"	0:51
8.	"Let Me Take You Home"	1:18
9.	"Memory Wall"	1:35
10.	"Silent Disco"	2:04
11.	"Thank You So Much for This"	1:27
12.	"This Is It"	2:18
13.	"What's the Word, Hummingbird?"	2:07
14.	"Let's Sell This Place"	2:19
15.	"Our Capacity to Move On"	1:27
16.	"New Goodbye"	0:45
17.	"New Hello"	1:14
Total length:		24:38

== Reception ==
Peter Debruge of Variety described the soundtrack as "incoherently eclectic", while Kate Erbland of IndieWire called it as "fantastic". Regarding the music of the film, Morgan Rojas of Cinemacy wrote "being a film about music, the jam-packed soundtrack doesn't fail to disappoint [...] Each track is a banger after banger". He further added that Lott's score adds strength to the musical soundscape. Joe Hammerschmidt of Warm 106.9 called Lott's score as "ethereal" and "foreboding".

In a positive review for the film, Coleman Spilde of The Daily Beast complimented Benson's choice of musical selections which made "The Greatest Hits earns its title". Alissa Wilkinson of The New York Times said that the musical selections "are fun and fresh, lacking the on-the-nose quality that a film with more bang-on choices might have provoked". Alex Maidy of JoBlo.com called it as "one of the best soundtracks in recent memory". Ross Bonaime of Collider described it as "fairly strong". Matt Mahler of MovieWeb called it as "a standout soundtrack, showcasing a diverse range of songs that set the perfect tone".

== Release history ==
Release dates and formats for The Greatest Hits (Original Soundtrack)
Region	Date	Format(s)	Label	Ref.
Various	April 12, 2024	Digital download; streaming	Hollywood	
Various	April 12, 2024	Vinyl	Hollywood	

== Additional music ==
The following songs were not included in the album:

- "This Is the Day" – The The
- "Pump Up the Jam" – Technotronic
- "Play It On My Radio" – Niki & the Dove
- "Sémaphore" – Requin Chagrin
- "Say Yes to Heaven" – Lana Del Rey
- "Friday I'm In Love" – Phoebe Bridgers (cover)
- "Fantasia in D Minor" – Mozart
