= Soundfly =

New York-based music education platform

- Website type: Music education
- Founded: 2015; 11 years ago
- Headquarters: Brooklyn, New York, USA
- Country of origin: United States
- Founder: Ian Temple
- Industry: Education
- Services: Music classes
- Website: soundfly.com

Soundfly is an online music education platform based in Brooklyn, New York. They offer online music courses and mentorship sessions as well as hosting a bi-weekly podcast, Themes and Variation, and a daily blog, Flypaper.

The company was founded in 2015 by Ian Temple.

== Courses ==
In 2022, Soundfly released courses on designing sample-based instruments with Son Lux's Ryan Lott, retrofuturistic, synth-based electronic music production with Com Truise, and rhythmic creativity with producer Jlin. Previously, in November 2021, Soundfly released a piano course covering music theory, improvisation, and beat making with pianist and producer Kiefer. Earlier that year, the company released a course on sampling and arranging with DJ and producer RJD2, which was filmed by RJD2 himself during the COVID-19 pandemic lockdown, and a course on vocal songwriting and production with pop singer Kimbra.

Previous courses have included the companion course for Carnegie Hall's Somewhere Project, as well as courses on synthesis, music production in Logic Pro and Ableton Live, music theory for producers, crowdfunding, beginner piano, and open tunings for guitar. They also produced a guide for how to learn things online at the outset of the coronavirus pandemic.

== Notable Instructors ==
- Ryan Lott
- Com Truise
- Jlin
- Kiefer
- RJD2
- Kimbra
- Andrew Huang
- Kaki King
- Ari Herstand
- Marin Alsop
- Amanda Dehnert
- Ethan Hein of NYU's MusED Lab
- Grant Zubrinski (bassist for MS MR and Chet Faker)
- Alex Wilson of Sleepmakeswaves
