= Kiefer (musician) =

American musician and producer

- Born: Kiefer Shackelford; January 30, 1992 (age 34); San Diego, California, United States
- Genres: Jazz; hip-hop; jazz rap; neo soul
- Occupations: Musician; Composer; Producer
- Instruments: Keys; Piano
- Years active: 2017—present
- Labels: Stones Throw; Leaving Records; Blue Note

Kiefer Shackelford (born (January 30, 1992), known mononymously as Kiefer, is an American pianist and producer based in Los Angeles, California.

== Biography ==
Born in 1992 in San Diego, Kiefer started playing piano around age six, and was first introduced to jazz by his father. Growing up, he took classical and jazz lessons, and by his teens was an adept soloist and began experimenting with producing his own computer-based hip-hop and electronic beats. After high school, he moved to Los Angeles and enrolled in UCLA’s Jazz Studies program, where he was mentored by renowned jazz guitarist Kenny Burrell, flautist James Newton and pianist Tamir Hendelman. It was at the institution where he experimented jazz composition and live improvisation with programmed electronic beats.

In 2017, Kiefer worked with musicians Abraham Laboriel, Gilbert Castellanos and Rob Thorsen. He also collaborated on several hip-hop projects with Stones Throw affiliates Mndsgn and Jonwayne. That same year, he released his debut album Kickinit Alone, on Leaving Records, where the title track was described as a 'short piano phrase looping like it was ripped from a dusty vinyl and brought to life' by Pitchfork.

Kiefer signed with Stones Throw the following year and debuted with Happysad. He released two EPs – Bridges and Superbloom – in 2019. Kiefer used various analog synths, and adopted an even more compositional approach to his songwriting for this series.

In March 2021, Kiefer released two singles – Superhero and Friends – before dropping the last instalment in the trilogy of EPs, Between Days, on Stones Throw. The EP features producers The Kount, 10.4 ROG, LAKEY INSPIRED and jazz trumpeter Theo Croker.

His own music projects aside, Kiefer worked on Anderson .Paak's album Ventura which debuted at number four on the US Billboard 200 and won Best R&B Album at the 2020 Grammy Awards. Kiefer co-produced the track Yada Yada and the album's lead single, "King James", which pays homage to LeBron James. He is also a fixture in Mndsgn's live setup, and has made beats with Kaytranada, and played with Terrace Martin, Moses Sumney, among others.

On November 10, 2021, Kiefer released a piano course — Kiefer: Keys, Chords, and Beats — with online music school Soundfly.

On February 18, 2022, Samsung released the 2022 version of their Galaxy S series's Over The Horizon, which was produced by Kiefer entirely.

== Discography ==
=== Studio albums ===
- Kickinit Alone (2017)
- Happysad (2018)
- When There's Love Around (2021)
- It's Ok, B U (2023)
- Memory Bomb (2026)

=== EPs ===
- Bridges (2019)
- Superbloom (2019)
- Between Days (2021)

=== Singles ===
- "Miss U" (2018)
- "Pariah (Kiefer Remix)" (2018)
- "Superhero" (2021)
- "Friends" (2021)
- "Everybody Loves The Sunshine" (2021) (with Theo Croker)
