= Ryan Lott =

American musician (born 1979)

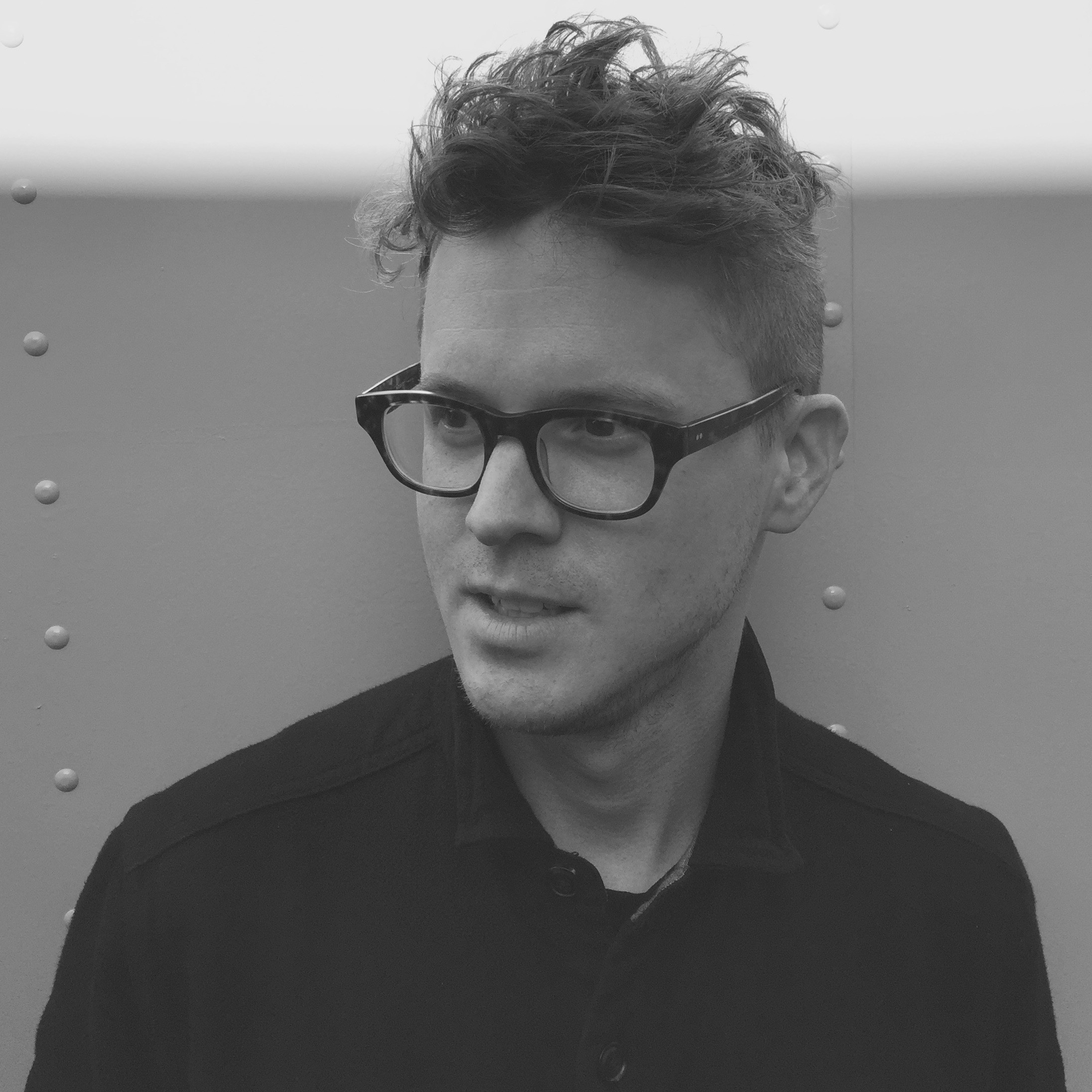
- Lott in 2016

Background information
- Born: January 24, 1979 (age 47); Denver, Colorado, U.S.
- Genre: Post rock
- Occupations: Musician; composer
- Labels: Joyful Noise; Anticon; This is Meru
- Website: ryan-lott.com

Ryan Lott (born January 24, 1979) is an American musician. He is the only founding member of the experimental trio Son Lux. He is also a member of Sisyphus and has scored the soundtracks for a number of films, most notably Everything Everywhere All at Once (2022), Mean Dreams (2017), Paper Towns (2015), and The Disappearance of Eleanor Rigby (2013). In 2020, Lott composed the soundtrack for the adventure game Tell Me Why. In 2022, he released a course on designing sample-based instruments with online music school Soundfly.

== Discography ==
=== As Ryan Lott ===
==== Albums ====
- Original Music From And Inspired By: The Disappearance Of Eleanor Rigby (Glassnote, 2014) (as/with Son Lux)
- Sisyphus (Asthmatic Kitty/Joyful Noise, 2014) (with Sisyphus, as Son Lux)
- Pentaptych (2019)
- Quartered (2020) (with Third Coast Percussion)

==== EPs ====
- Beak & Claw (Anticon, 2012) (with Sisyphus, as Son Lux)

==== Soundtracks ====
- Paper Towns (Original Score) (2015)
- Tell Me Why: Original Video Game Soundtrack (2020)
- The Greatest Hits (Original Score) (2024)
- Marathon (2026)

=== Collaborations ===
- First (2017) (with yMusic)
- S16 (2020) (with Woodkid)
