= ForPlay =

EP by Saint Motel
- Released: September 8, 2009
- Genres: Indie rock, power pop
- Length: 23:03
- Label: OnThe

Saint Motel chronology
ForPlay (2009)	Voyeur (2012)

Singles from ForPlay
- 1. "Dear Dictator" Released: April 22, 2009; 2. "Butch" Released: Aug 3, 2009; 3. "“To My Enemies”" Released: Dec 1, 2009

ForPlay is the first EP by American indie rock band Saint Motel. The album had a music video for every song that was also included on the CD itself.

"Dear Dictator" was featured in HBO's 2013 trailer for Boardwalk Empire.

== Critical reception ==
Jim Fusilli of the Wall Street Journal labeled the music as "garage-glam" and Drew Kennedy from BMI wrote "Saint Motel demonstrates their unique ability to seamlessly intertwine melody with melodrama without diminishing the power of either."

== Track listing ==
No.	Title	Length
1.	"Eat Your Heart Out"	3:16
2.	"Butch"	3:18
3.	"Dear Dictator"	4:09
4.	"Pity Party"	4:30
5.	"To My Enemies"	4:19
6.	"Do Everything Now"	4:11

== Personnel ==
- A/J Jackson – lead vocals, guitar, piano
- Aaron Sharp – lead guitar
- Greg Erwin – drums
- Dak Lerdamornpong – bass
