= Alice Boman =

Swedish singer-songwriter

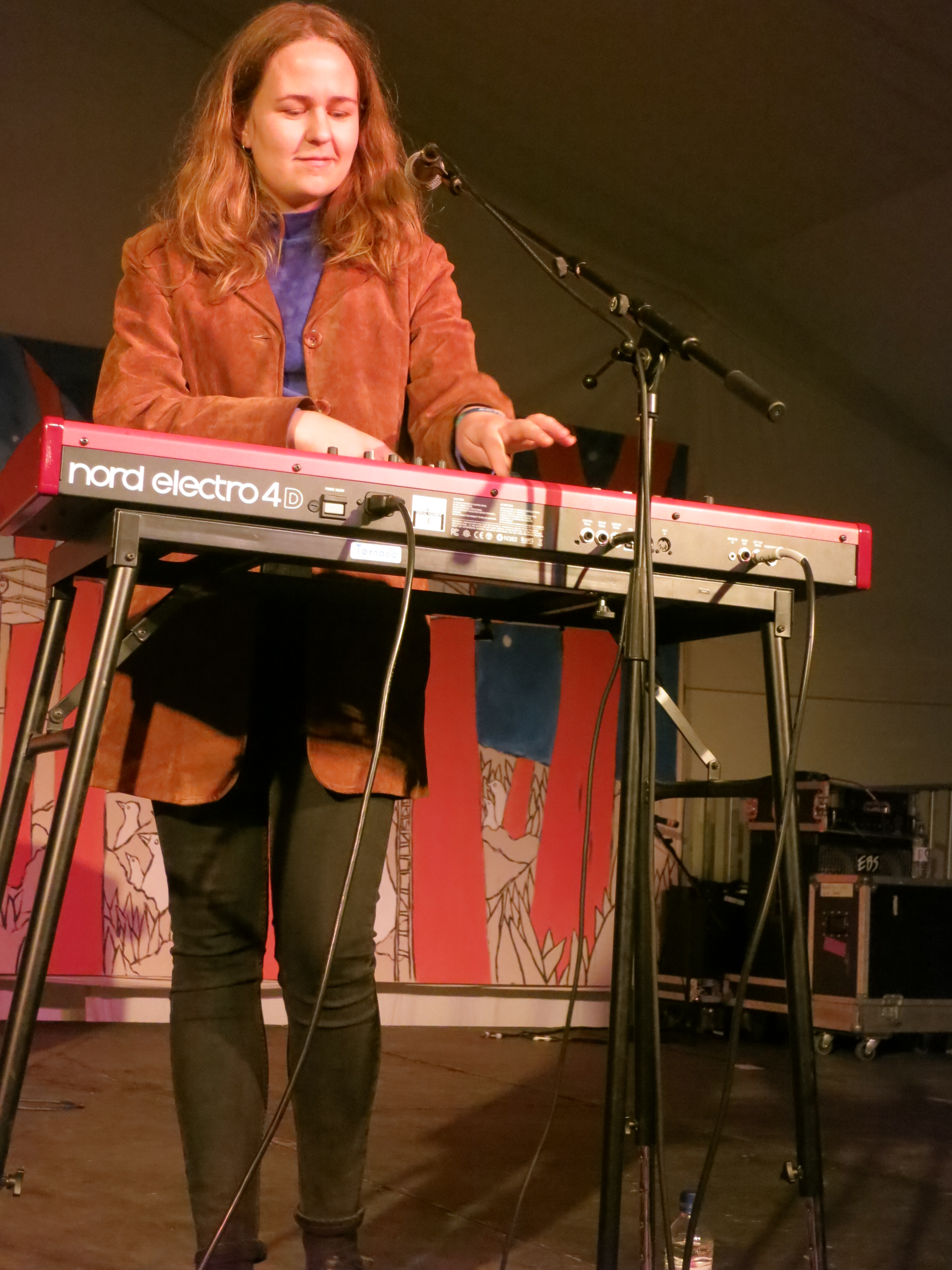
- Boman performing at the 2014 End of the Road Festival in Wiltshire, England

Background information
- Born: Alice Maria Boman; 2 December 1987 (age 38); Malmö, Sweden
- Genres: Pop
- Occupations: Singer-songwriter; musician
- Instruments: Vocals; keyboards
- Years active: 2013–present
- Labels: Adrian Recordings; The Control Group; Happy Death; PIAS Recordings
- Website: aliceboman.com

Alice Maria Boman (born 2 December 1987) is a Swedish singer-songwriter and musician.

== Career ==
Boman recorded her first extended play (EP), Skisser (which means "sketches" in Swedish) in her bedroom, never intending it to be publicly released. She treated the recordings like demos, and sent them to a studio with the intention of getting the songs professionally recorded. However, she said that "the guy at the studio liked [the demos] so much that he sent them to Adrian Recordings, and they wanted to release them." The EP came out on Adrian Recordings on 22 May 2013, and it has since been re-released on limited edition vinyl. An EP containing remixes of Skisser tracks "Waiting" and "Skiss 2" was digitally released in November 2013. It contained remixes by 1987, NATTEN, Summer Heart, Kalter and PAL.

A video for 'Skiss 3' was released in January 2014, directed by Henric Claesson at Studio Pop.

In June 2014, Boman released her second extended play called EP II. The music video for the first single "What" was filmed and directed by Studio Pop. The Fader premiered the video on 9 April 2014.

Boman released her single "Dreams" in September 2017. It earned praise by Billboard, The New York Times and Gorilla vs. Bear among others. The music video was filmed in Vårhallarna, Sweden.

Alice Boman's music has been featured in a wide range of television shows and films, such as 13 Reasons Why, Suits, Paper Towns, Transparent, Trinkets Wanderlust, The Resident, Dickinson, Valeria, Astrid et Raphaëlle and Prisma.

== Discography ==
Studio albums

- Dream On (2020)
- The Space Between (2022)

EPs

- Skisser (2013)
- Skisser / Remixed (2013)
- EP II (2014)

Singles

- "What" (2014)
- "Over" (2014)
- "Be Mine" (2014)
- "Be Mine" (Jaakko Eino Kalevi Remix) (2015)
- "Dreams" (2017)
- "End of Time" (2017)
- "Heartbeat" (2018)
