= My Type (Saint Motel song) =

Single by Saint Motel

from the EP My Type
- B-side: "Ace in the Hole"
- Released: January 20, 2014
- Genre: Indie pop; alternative dance; nu-disco; funk rock
- Length: 3:26
- Label: Saint Motel; Elektra; Parlophone
- Songwriter: Saint Motel
- Producers: A. J. Jackson, Joe Napolitano

Saint Motel singles chronology
| "Ace in the Hole" (2014) | "My Type" (2014) | "Cold Cold Man" (2015) |

"My Type" is a song by American indie pop band Saint Motel. It was released as the lead single from their EP of the same name in August 2014.

== Content ==
On the lyric, "You're just my type - you've got a pulse and you are breathing," singer A.J. Jackson said, "When I write lyrics, in general I like stuff that's a bit tongue-in-cheek, and this concept was initially based on a fight I was having with a lady friend at the time. It kind of stemmed with the idea that I'd never really thought too much about my type. And her idea was, that's because everyone's my type. I thought that was kind of funny."

== Composition ==
The song is composed in a key of C minor and the tempo is 118 beats per minute.

== Music video ==
Two music videos were made for "My Type". The first video was released on January 20, 2014, to coincide with the release of the song's 7" vinyl release. Directed by Sam Winkler, it features lead singer A. J. Jackson in a clip filmed at an Italian discoteca with Raffaella Carrà.

The second video was released on June 12 and was directed by Jackson. This version takes place at a 1970s-themed house party attended by the band members and several other characters. As a news helicopter circles overhead, the characters experience sexual tension, eventually creating a wild atmosphere. Jackson described the video as "early '70s cigarette ads and New York street photography." and said, "We didn't want it to be a period piece. Obviously, it's not if you watch it. It's not accurate to any time. Hopefully by not being accurate to any time, it serves all time—retrofuturism".

== Appearances in media ==
The song has been featured in two films, Paper Towns and Mr. Right (both 2015). The song has also appeared on the soundtracks of video games FIFA 15 and Pro Evolution Soccer 2016 as well as FIFA 23, as part of the game’s Ultimate FIFA Soundtrack (a compilation of 40 songs from past FIFA games).

In television, the song has been used as an ident for the German show "Wer weiß denn sowas?", is heard in the 100th episode of The Blacklist, and a sample of the song was used in TV commercials for Uber and for the streaming service Now TV. The song was used in a series of Volkswagen ads in 2016 as part of its Memorial Day sale.

It is the theme for British television company Now TV, being used in their adverts.

The song has been covered in Toki Pona by musician jan Usawi, as "kule mi", released on August 5, 2023.

The song has also appeared in Ms. Marvel episode 2 Crushed on June 15, 2022

== Track listing ==
- Saint Motel — SM004 — 7" vinyl single

Side A
| No. | Title | Length |
|---|---|---|
| 1. | "My Type" | 3:23 |

Side B
| No. | Title | Length |
|---|---|---|
| 1. | "Ace in the Hole" | 3:43 |

- Elektra — 548249-1 — My Type 10" vinyl EP

Side A
| No. | Title | Length |
|---|---|---|
| 1. | "My Type" | 3:26 |
| 2. | "Ace in the Hole" | 3:46 |

Side B
| No. | Title | Length |
|---|---|---|
| 1. | "Cold Cold Man" | 3:51 |
| 2. | "Midnight Movies" | 3:44 |

== Charts ==
=== Weekly charts ===
| Chart (2014–2015) | Peak position |
|---|---|
| Belgium (Ultratip Bubbling Under Flanders) | 86 |
| Belgium (Ultratip Bubbling Under Wallonia) | 3 |
| Canada Rock (Billboard) | 7 |
| CIS Airplay (TopHit) | 186 |
| France (SNEP) | 130 |
| Italy (FIMI) | 14 |
| Scottish Singles Sales (Official Charts) | 20 |
| Switzerland (Schweizer Hitparade) | 51 |
| UK Singles (Official Charts) | 34 |
| US Adult Alternative Airplay (Billboard) | 5 |
| US Alternative Airplay (Billboard) | 9 |
| US Hot Rock & Alternative Songs (Billboard) | 18 |
| US Rock & Alternative Airplay (Billboard) | 11 |

=== Year-end charts ===
| Chart (2015) | Position |
|---|---|
| US Adult Alternative Songs (Billboard) | 27 |
| US Alternative Songs (Billboard) | 29 |
| US Hot Rock Songs (Billboard) | 43 |
| US Rock Airplay Songs (Billboard) | 31 |

== Certifications ==
| Region | Certification | Certified units/sales |
|---|---|---|
| Canada (Music Canada) | 2× Platinum | 160,000^{‡} |
| Italy (FIMI) | Platinum | 30,000^{‡} |
| New Zealand (RMNZ) | Platinum | 30,000^{‡} |
| Switzerland (IFPI Switzerland) | Gold | 15,000^{‡} |
| United Kingdom (BPI) | Gold | 400,000^{‡} |
| United States (RIAA) | Platinum | 1,000,000^{‡} |
^{‡} Sales+streaming figures based on certification alone.
