= A. J. Jackson =

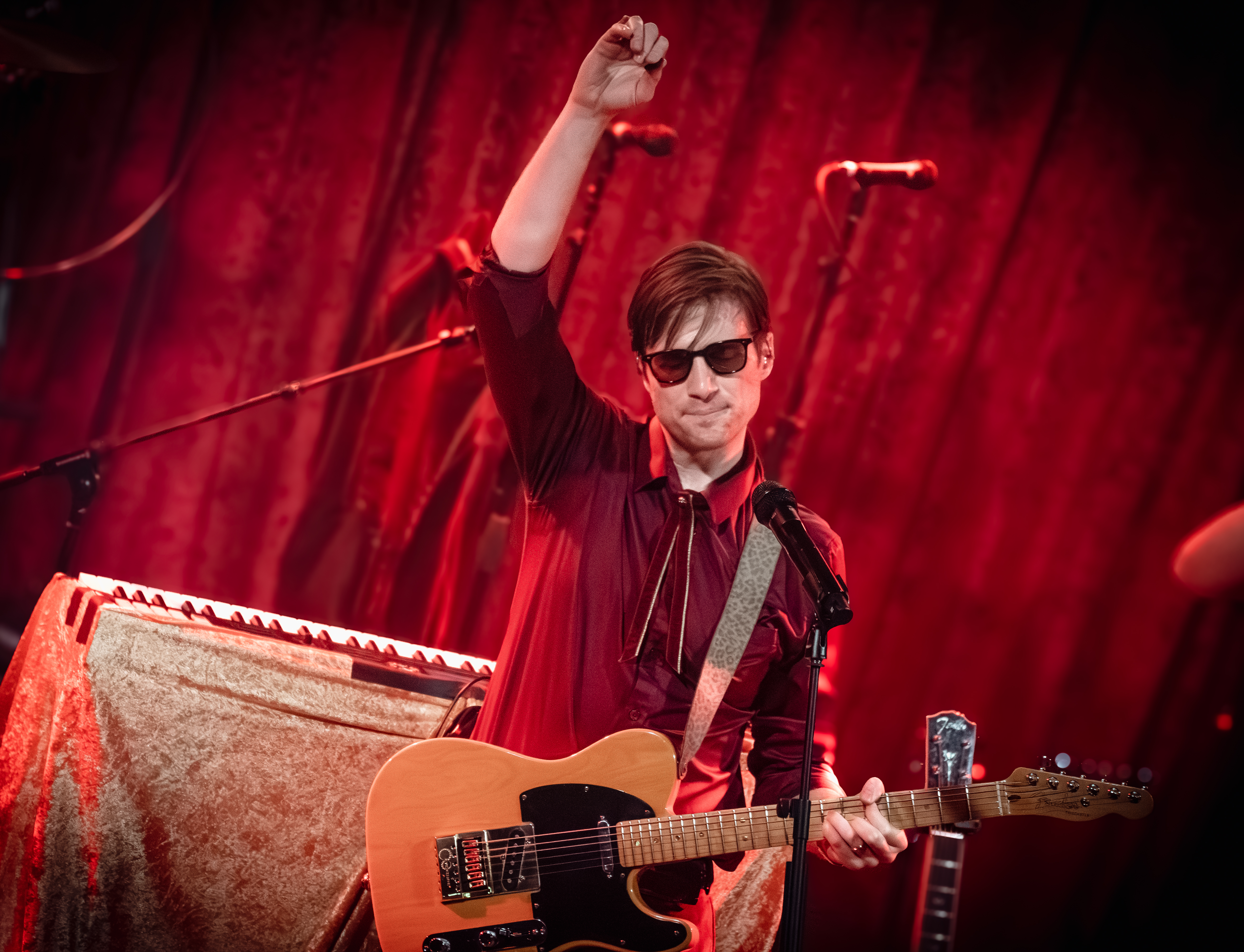
- Jackson in 2024

Background information
- Born: Alexander Jackson; September 14, 1983 (age 42); Minneapolis, Minnesota, U.S.
- Origin: Los Angeles, California, U.S.
- Genres: Alternative rock, indie pop, indie rock
- Occupations: Musician, record producer, songwriter, singer, filmmaker
- Instruments: Guitar, vocals, piano, bass
- Years active: 2007–present
- Labels: Parlophone Records, Elektra Records, Atlantic Records, OnThe Records

A. J. Jackson (born Alexander Jackson) is an American filmmaker, musician, songwriter, record producer, and perhaps best known as the lead singer for the band Saint Motel. He is known for his enthusiastic stage performances.

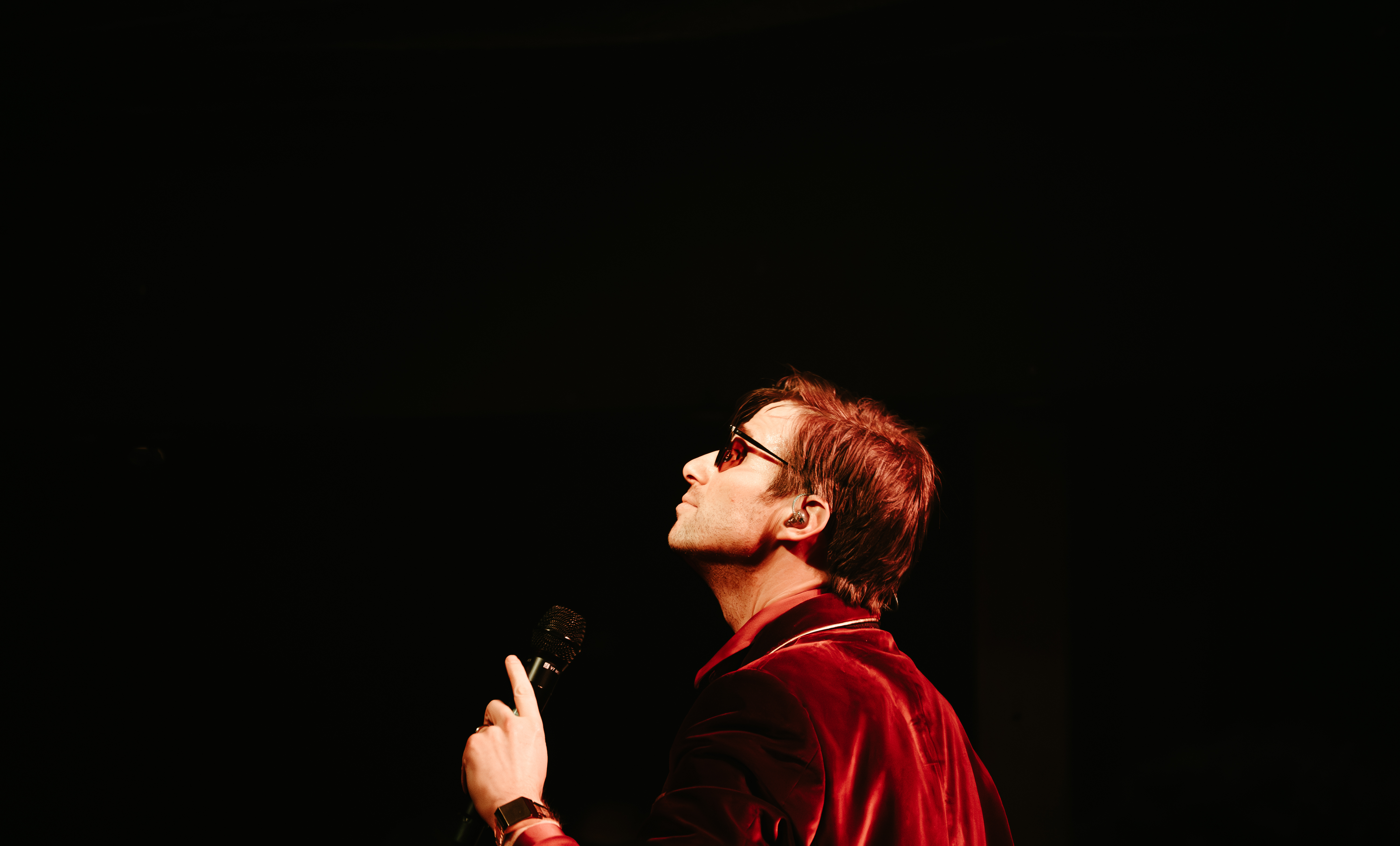
A.J. Jackson performing as lead singer of Saint Motel during "The Awards Show Tour."

== Early life ==
Jackson was born on September 14, 1983 and raised in Minneapolis, Minnesota. He first started playing piano and writing his own music at about age seven. He studied at The Blake School (Minneapolis) and later attended film school at Chapman University.

== Music career ==
Jackson started playing in bands around the 6th grade moving from bassist to guitarist and singer in high school. He met Aaron Sharp while attending university in Southern California and they created Saint Motel around 2007. Saint Motel released its debut E.P. ForPlay in 2009 with Jackson as the lead singer and main songwriter. Jackson's songwriting for the EP received praise from The Washington Post.

Saint Motel released the full-length album Voyeur, whose tracks reached the top of the Hype Machine Charts in 2012, and an EP, My Type, which includes two international alternative top 40 singles written by Jackson, "Cold Cold Man" and the platinum-selling single, "My Type".

In 2015, Jackson led Saint Motel and dancers at the Coachella Valley Music and Arts Festival, as one of the stops on the band's US tour.

In 2016 the band released its second full-length album, saintmotelevision, featuring the single "Move" which Jackson stated he wrote while they were on tour in Germany. Inspired by new technological possibilities, Jackson helped make this album the world's first complete virtual reality and, later, augmented reality full-length album in 2016 and 2017.

In 2019 the band released part one of its three-part album The Original Motion Picture Soundtrack featuring "Van Horn", which Jackson said he found inspiration for writing from the town of the same name in Texas while they were on tour.

In 2024 the band released their fourth full-length album "Symphony In the Sky" on Valentine's day (Feb 14), with an orchestral feel, it built on the some of themes from the previous album, but strayed from the punk style of early releases, including "Get it at Home" being the most recent music video directed by Jackson, somewhat reigniting his film career.

== Film career ==
After graduation, Jackson became a freelance filmmaker directing and editing commercials for companies like Scion, Hyundai, and Elle Magazine, as well as music videos for bands like Royal Teeth and Futurecop!, including his own band Saint Motel, originally dubbed Turkish Rocket. When the band's debut album ForPlay was released, they had created a music video to accompany each song of the album. Jackson's film clients include Barry Manilow, Band of Skulls, and Jason Mraz. In 2008, Jackson and his comedy partners in sketch comedy group, Craptastic were nominated for a MTV Movie Award for a "Cloverfield" parody called "Broverfield".
