= Saint Motel =

American band

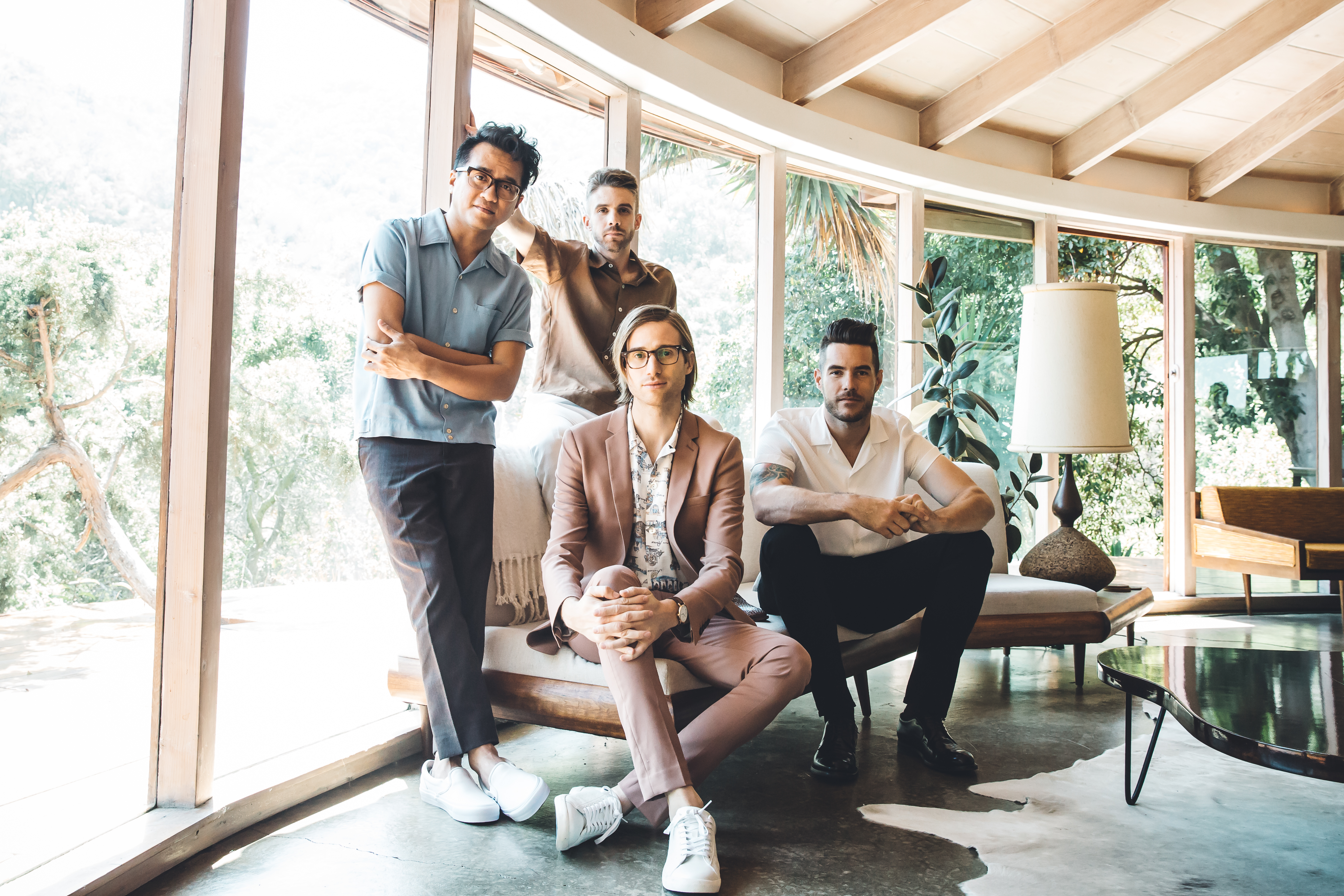
- Saint Motel in 2016

Background information
- Origin: Los Angeles, California, US
- Genres: Indie pop; indie rock; funk rock
- Years active: 2007–present
- Labels: Elektra; Parlophone; Saint Motel; OnThe
- Members: A. J. Jackson; Aaron Sharp; Greg Erwin; Dak Lerdamornpong
- Website: saintmotel.com

Saint Motel (stylized in all caps) is an American indie pop band from Los Angeles, whose music has been described as everything from dream pop to progressive indie. The band is composed of singer, songwriter, and producer, A. J. Jackson (lead vocals, guitar, piano), Aaron Sharp (lead guitar), Dak Lerdamornpong (bass) and Greg Erwin (drums).

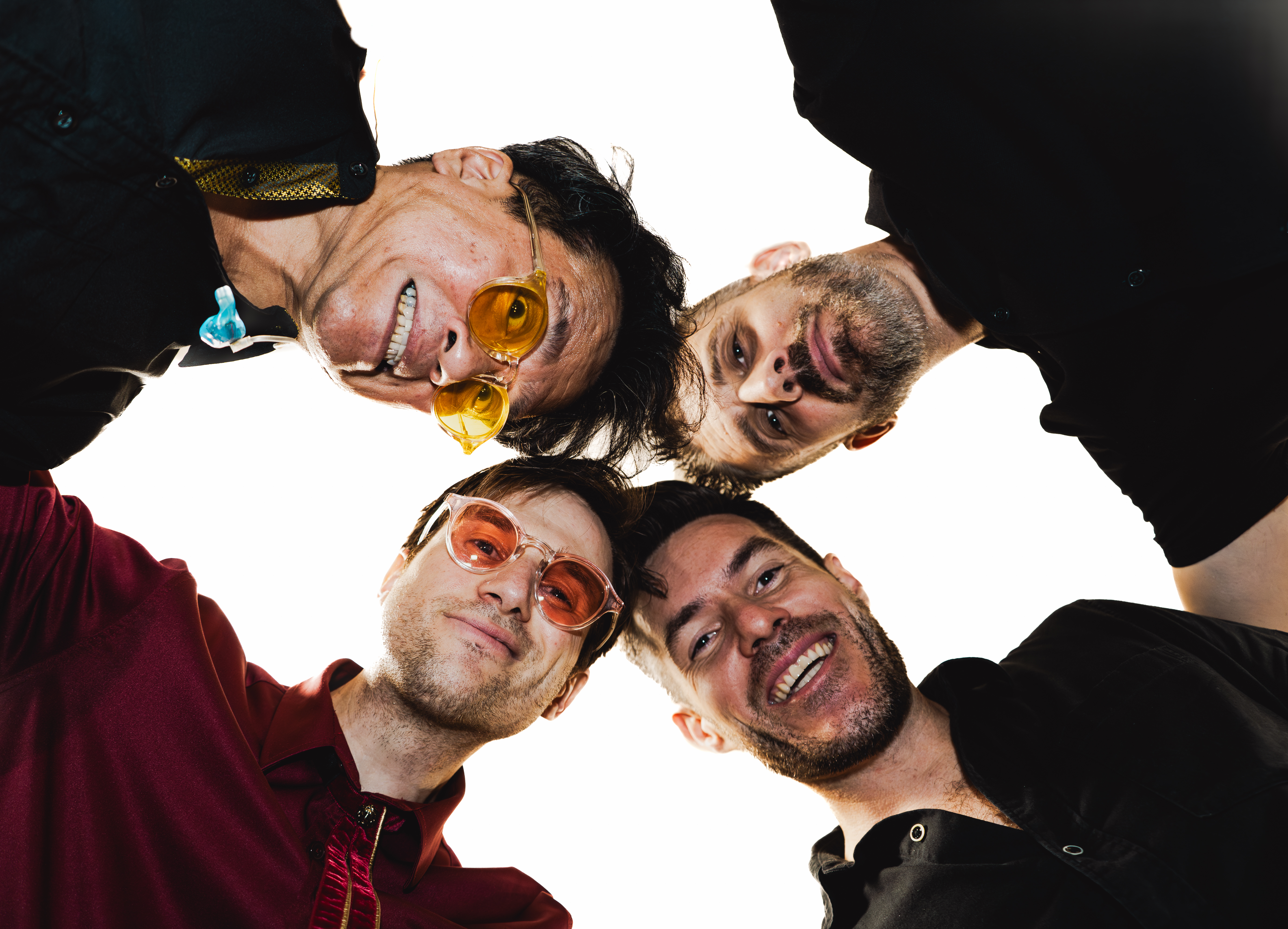
Saint Motel photographed during "The Awards Show Tour" in Dublin, Ireland in 2024

== Career ==
=== 2007–2011: ForPlay ===
The group initially came together while Jackson and Sharp were attending film school in Southern California. The duo later met Lerdamornpong at a sushi restaurant where he worked near campus and Greg who went to a school nearby. The band emphasizes visuals in addition to its music; their 2009 debut EP, ForPlay, included a video for each of the six songs.

=== 2012–2013: Voyeur ===
The band's first full-length album, Voyeur, debuted at No. 18 on the alt specialty radio charts and six of its eleven songs charted on the Hype Machine Charts. The album was praised by journals ranging from The Washington Post to Daytrotter. KCRW Music Librarian and DJ Eric J. Lawrence wrote, "They have attacked [the debut album] with gusto on Voyeur, adding dynamic touches to their rock-solid core of songwriting", and, "Overall the album is a satisfying package from start to finish".

=== 2014–2015: My Type ===
The band released the EP My Type with Parlophone on August 17 in the UK. "My Type" climbed the Top 30 charts in many European countries including Italy where it was certified platinum. The band embarked on two European and one US tour in support of the EP and were expected to release the full-length album later in 2015. In December 2014 Saint Motel announced that they had joined the Elektra Records roster. Saint Motel appeared as the musical guest on Jimmy Kimmel Live! on ABC performing the songs "My Type" and "Cold Cold Man". In April 2015, Saint Motel performed during both weekends on the main stage at the 2015 Coachella Valley Music and Arts Festival. They also performed at Piqniq and the 2015 KROQ Weenie Roast.

=== 2016–2018: Saintmotelevision ===
On July 11, 2016, Saint Motel announced Saintmotelevision, their second album, would be released on October 21, 2016. The band embarked on a North American tour in support of the album, with Hippo Campus and JR JR as supporting acts. On August 12, Saint Motel released the album's first single, "Move", with an accompanying 360-degree video. The song was featured in the EA Sports video game FIFA 17. In September, in an exclusive with Billboard, they released another song from the album, "You Can Be You". Saint Motel has released 10 virtual reality components, one for each song on the album. This makes Saint Motel the first band to release an entire album with a virtual reality VR experience to accompany every track. Saint Motel has continued to experiment with new technologies, releasing the first-ever augmented reality version of Saintmotelevision.

=== 2019–2021: The Original Motion Picture Soundtrack ===
On October 16, 2019, the band released the EP The Original Motion Picture Soundtrack: Part 1, the first of two extended plays consisting of songs from their third album, The Original Motion Picture Soundtrack. On March 16, 2020, the band released the single "A Good Song Never Dies". This was part of the EP The Original Motion Picture Soundtrack: Part 2, the second part of their third album. In 2020, "A Good Song Never Dies" was featured on the soundtrack to the video game MLB The Show 20. On June 25, 2021, the full The Original Motion Picture Soundtrack album was released, containing every song from both EPs, the previously released single "It's All Happening", and four new songs.

=== 2023–2025: Saint Motel Studios and Saint Motel & the Symphony in the Sky ===
On May 5, 2023, the band released their first single of what they described as "Saint Motel Studios", a concept based on the classic Hollywood film studio system that they described more as a phase than an album. The new single "Everyone's A Guru Now" was quickly followed by "Fine Wine" on August 4, and “Slowly Spilling Out” on November 3. They then released "Stay Golden" on July 26, 2024.

On September 24, 2024, the band announced their fourth studio album, Saint Motel & the Symphony in the Sky, to be released in February 2025. Alongside this, the band announced the Symphony In The Sky Tour, with shows across North America throughout 2025. On October 11, 2024, they released another single "Steady Hand".

On February 14th, 2025, Saint Motel & the Symphony in the Sky was released, containing the previously released singles and seven additional songs. On March 14th, the band performed "Get It At Home" on Jimmy Kimmel Live! Just four days later, the band premiered a music video for the song, shot at Mount Wilson Observatory in California.

=== 2025–Present: Afterglow ===
On September 12, 2025, the band announced their fifth studio album, Afterglow, scheduled for release on October 10. The announcement was accompanied by the lead single, 'Wait & See', and its lyric video.

On October 6, the band revealed the album's ten-song track listing via social media, featuring audio teasers for each track.

Afterglow was released on October 10, 2025. Three days later, a lyric video for the album's closing track, 'Up & Away We Go', was released.

== Live shows ==
Saint Motel has created or performed at a variety of shows, including The Kaleidoscopic Mind Explosion in 3D, Future Fathers Day, The Black & White Show, Make Contact, the 80/35 Music Festival in Des Moines, Iowa, and Valentine's Zombie Prom and has toured with bands such as Band of Skulls, Nico Vega, Imagine Dragons, Races, Hockey, Arctic Monkeys, Weezer, and Lights. Saint Motel performed at the 2015 Sanremo Music Festival in Sanremo, Italy, and at the Coachella Valley Music and Arts Festival. On December 12, they performed in Live Out (Monterrey, Mexico). The band opened for Twenty One Pilots in 2019 on The Bandito Tour, as well as Panic! At The Disco on their Death of a Bachelor Tour. Starting in 2023 the band began their latest endeavor, "The Awards Show Tour" which was modeled after a classic Awards Show program where the fans could vote on songs throughout the night.

On March 7, 2025, Saint Motel embarked on the Symphony in the Sky Tour. The world tour included shows across the United States, Canada, Europe, Australia, and Mexico.

== Discography ==
=== Studio albums ===
Title	Details	Peak chart positions			
Title	Details	US	US Alt.	US Rock	ITA
Voyeur	Released: July 10, 2012; Label: On The Records; Formats: Digital download, CD, LP	—	—	—	—
saintmotelevision	Released: October 21, 2016; Label: Elektra Records; Formats: Digital download, CD, LP	62	9	13	100
The Original Motion Picture Soundtrack	Released: June 25, 2021; Label: Elektra Records; Formats: Digital download, CD, LP	—	—	—	—
Saint Motel & the Symphony in the Sky	Released: February 14, 2025; Label: Elektra Records; Formats: Digital download, CD, LP	—	—	—	—
Afterglow	Released: October 10, 2025; Label: On The Records; Formats: Digital download, CD, LP	—	—	—	—
"—" denotes album that did not chart or was not released

=== Extended plays ===
Title	Details	Peaks
Title	Details	ITA
ForPlay	Released: 8 September 2009; Label: On The Records; Formats: Digital download, CD	—
7"1	Released: December 13, 2011; Label: On The Records; Formats: 7"	—
7"2	Released: 2013; Label: On The Records; Formats: 7"	—
My Type	Released: August 17, 2014; Label: Elektra, Parlophone; Formats: Digital download, CD	52
The Original Motion Picture Soundtrack: Part 1	Released: October 16, 2019; Label: Elektra; Formats: Digital download	—
The Original Motion Picture Soundtrack: Part 2	Released: September 18, 2020; Label: Elektra; Formats: Digital download	—
"—" denotes album that did not chart or was not released

=== Singles ===
Title	Year	Peak chart positions										Certifications	Album
Title	Year	US Rock	BEL (WA)	CAN Rock	CIS	FRA	ICE	ITA	SCO	SWI	UK	Certifications	Album
"Puzzle Pieces"	2011	—	—	—	—	—	—	—	—	—	—		Voyeur
"At Least I Have Nothing"	2012	—	—	—	—	—	—	—	—	—	—		Voyeur
"1997"	2012	—	—	—	—	—	—	—	—	—	—		Voyeur
"Benny Goodman"	2012	—	—	—	—	—	—	—	—	—	—		Voyeur
"Ace in the Hole"	2013	—	—	—	—	—	—	—	—	—	—		My Type EP
"My Type"	2014	18	53	7	186	130	—	14	20	51	34	RIAA: Platinum; BPI: Gold; FIMI: Platinum; IFPI SWI: Gold; MC: 2× Platinum	My Type EP
"Cold Cold Man"	2015	— (Note: "Cold Cold Man" did not chart on the Hot Rock & Alternative Songs chart but did peak at number 37 on the Rock Airplay chart.)	—	—	—	—	—	45	—	—	—	RIAA: Gold; FIMI: Gold	My Type EP
"Move"	2016	29	—	37	—	—	—	48	—	—	—	RIAA: Gold	saintmotelevision
"You Can Be You"	2016	—	—	—	—	—	—	—	—	—	—		saintmotelevision
"Born Again"	2016	—	—	—	—	—	—	—	—	—	—		saintmotelevision
"Destroyer"	2017	—	—	—	—	—	—	—	—	—	—		saintmotelevision
"Van Horn"	2019	30	—	47	—	—	—	—	—	—	—		The Original Motion Picture Soundtrack
"A Good Song Never Dies"	2020	—	—	—	—	—	—	—	—	—	—		The Original Motion Picture Soundtrack
"Preach"	2020	— (Note: "Preach" did not chart on the Hot Rock & Alternative Songs chart but did peak at number 33 on the Alternative Airplay chart.)	—	—	—	—	—	—	—	—	—		The Original Motion Picture Soundtrack
"Feel Good"	2021	—	—	—	—	—	12	—	—	—	—		Non-album single
"It's All Happening"	2021	— (Note: "It's All Happening" did not chart on the Hot Rock & Alternative Songs chart but did peak at number 39 on the Alternative Airplay chart.)	—	—	—	—	—	—	—	—	—		The Original Motion Picture Soundtrack
"Everyone's a Guru Now"	2023	—	—	—	—	—	—	—	—	—	—		Saint Motel & the Symphony in the Sky
"Slowly Spilling Out"	2023	—	—	—	—	—	—	—	—	—	—		Saint Motel & the Symphony in the Sky
"Fine Wine"	2023	—	—	—	—	—	—	—	—	—	—		Saint Motel & the Symphony in the Sky
"Stay Golden"	2024	—	—	—	—	—	—	—	—	—	—		Saint Motel & the Symphony in the Sky
"Wait & See"	2025	—	—	—	—	—	—	—	—	—	—		Afterglow
"—" denotes a single that did not chart or was not released.

=== Other certified songs ===
Title	Year	Certifications	Album
"Sweet Talk"	2016	RIAA: Gold	saintmotelevision

=== Videography ===
Title	Year	Director
"Butch"	2009	A. J. Jackson
"Dear Dictator"	2009	Carlos Estrada
"To My Enemies"	2009	Carlos Estrada
"Eat Your Heart Out"	2009	Evan Savitt
"Pity Party"	2009	A. J. Jackson
"Do Everything Now"	2009	A. J. Jackson
"Dear Dictator" (Sam Sparro Remix)	2010	A. J. Jackson
"Puzzle Pieces"	2011	A. J. Jackson
"At Least I Have Nothing"	2011	Saint Motel
"1997"	2012	A. J. Jackson
"Benny Goodman"	2012	A. J. Jackson
"Daydream/Wetdream/Nightmare"	2013	Sidsel Sørensen
"My Type" (Unofficial)	2014	Sam Winkler
"My Type"	2014	A. J. Jackson
"Cold Cold Man" (Unofficial)	2015	N/A
"Cold Cold Man"	2015	Chris Osbrink
"Move"	2016	Nick Roney and Zach Wechter
"You Can Be You" (Virtualizer)	2016	N/A
"Born Again" (Virtualizer)	2016	N/A
"Late Night Tour" (Recap Video)	2018	N/A
"Old Soul" (Official Visualizer)	2019	
"Sisters" (Official Visualizer)	2019	
"Van Horn" (Official Visualizer)	2019	
"Diane Mozart" (Official Visualizer)	2019	
"Save Me" (Official Visualizer)	2019	
"Van Horn"	2020	A. J. Jackson
"Preach"	2020	N/A
"It's all happening"	2021	N/A
"Slowly Spilling Out"	2023	A. J. Jackson & Mario Contini
"It's All Happening"	2023	A. J. Jackson & Mario Contini
