= Yell & Ice =

Remix album by Subtle
- Released: October 11, 2007 (Digital); October 23, 2007 (CD)
- Genre: Electronic, indie rock, experimental rock, alternative hip hop
- Label: Lex Records

Subtle chronology
| For Hero: For Fool (2006) | Yell & Ice (2007) | Exiting Arm (2008) |

Professional ratings
Review scores
| Source | Rating |
|---|---|
| Popmatters | 7/10 stars |

Yell & Ice is the album by American alternative hip hop sextet Subtle. It was released on Lex Records in 2007.

As Wishingbone was to A New White, Yell & Ice is a sibling-album to For Hero: For Fool, containing remixes and reworkings of tracks from that album, including new material. The album expands and continues the story of the character Hour Hero Yes. It features collaborations with members of several other indie bands such as TV on the Radio, Wolf Parade, Dosh, Fog as well as one with frequent Doseone collaborator Yoni Wolf, also known as Why?. The artwork for the album is by SSSR, which also produced the artwork for Wishingbone and created all of Subtle's music videos.

An early press release from Lex Records described the album as including a "one-off Clouddead reunion" leading to some confusion among fans. Yoni Wolf but not Odd Nosdam from the Clouddead trio appears on the album.

== Track listing ==
1. "Falling" feat. Why? of Clouddead (3:50)
2. "Middleclass Haunt" feat. Dan Boeckner of Wolf Parade (4:35)
3. "Deathful" feat. Tunde Adebimpe of TV on the Radio, Andrew Broder of Fog and Dosh (3:21)
4. "Islandmind" (3:30)
5. "The Pit Within Pits" feat. Markus Acher of The Notwist (5:14)
6. "Cut Yell" (5:29)
7. "Not" (3:19)
8. "Sinking Pinks" feat. Chris Adams of Hood (5:54)
9. "Requiem for a Dive" (3:34)
