= Fortismere School =

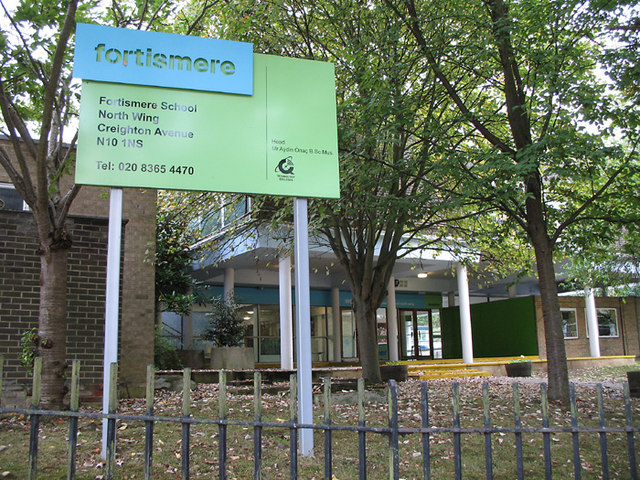
- North Wing entrance

Location
- South Wing, Tetherdown; Muswell Hill, Greater London, N10 1NE; England; 51°35′34″N 0°09′03″W

Information
- Other name: Fortismere
- Type: Foundation school
- Established: 1983; 43 years ago (Tollington Park in 1879)
- Local authority: Haringey London Borough Council
- Department for Education URN: 102156 Tables
- Ofsted: Reports
- Head teacher: Zoe Judge
- Gender: Mixed
- Age range: 11–18
- Enrolment: 1,767 (2019)
- Capacity: 1,655
- Campus size: 20 acres (8.1 ha)
- Houses: Franklin; Keats; Selvon; Turing; Wollstonecraft; (Note: Referred to as 'Colleges')
- Colours: Blue and green
- Website: www.fortismere.haringey.sch.uk

Fortismere School (simply referred to as Fortismere) is an 11–18 mixed, foundation secondary school and sixth form in Muswell Hill, Greater London, England.

In 2016, it was ranked by The Sunday Times as the 12th best comprehensive school in the country. In its most recent Ofsted inspection, it was rated "Good".

== History ==
=== Private schools ===
Tollington Park College, a private educational establishment for boys, was founded by William Brown in 1879 in Tollington Park, London N4. Rapid population growth around Muswell Hill created the need for a new school. Campbell Brown, the founder's son, established Tollington Boys School in Tetherdown, Muswell Hill in 1901. Brown then opened Tollington High School for Girls in nearby Collingwood Avenue in 1910. In 1919 both schools were purchased by the local education authority. Aside from the senior management, the two schools operated independently.

=== Grammar schools ===
After World War II, this became a state grammar school and the attached preparatory school became Tetherdown Primary School (this moved from the site in 1958 when it exchanged premises with the girls' grammar school). In 1958 the current building was erected and Tollington High School for Girls and Tollington Grammar School for Boys merged to become Tollington Grammar School (co-ed). In 1955, William Grimshaw Secondary Modern School (named after a local councillor) opened on an adjoining site in Creighton Avenue, taking the senior classes from Coldfall Council School. It offered extended classes from 1961.

=== Creighton Comprehensive School ===
With the introduction of comprehensive education in Haringey in 1967, Tollington Grammar School and William Grimshaw Secondary Modern School were merged to form Creighton School. Charles Loades, head of William Grimshaw since 1958, became head, remaining until his retirement in 1974.

In the early 1970s, Creighton School became the centrepiece of a Labour Party educational experiment. Situated in the middle-class, largely white suburb of Muswell Hill it was decided to integrate a large number of Afro-Caribbean and other ethnic minority children into the school from distant parts of the borough in an attempt to maximise education choice and social interaction – a policy based heavily on the United States' then-current system of desegregation busing. In 1975, before this new intake had worked through the school, around one-third of the Sixth Form was either a first-generation immigrant, or had a surname of Cypriot or Asian origin. The head who was charged with overseeing this experiment was Molly Hattersley, a leading socialist.

As a part of the continuing debate about comprehensive schools, Creighton School became the subject of a series of articles in the Sunday Times and a subsequent book by Hunter Davies, The Creighton Report, illustrated by an A-Level Photography student at the school and the Sunday Times photojournalist Frank Herrmann.

=== Fortismere School ===
After further reorganisation, Creighton School and another comprehensive, Alexandra Park School, were combined under the new name of Fortismere School. It opened in September 1983. Andrew Nixon, who had been headteacher of Alexandra Park School from 1980–3 prior to the merger, became Fortismere's first headteacher from 1983 to 2005, and played a major role in the development of the school's liberal and progressive ethos that emphasised pluralism, as well as gaining Technology College status in 1997, which lasted until it became a foundation school. Technology College status helped fund major developments to the school's infrastructure during Nixon's tenure, including construction of a new science block in 1999, a sixth form learning resource centre in 2002, and a county-standard sports hall, tennis courts and artificial pitch in 2004. During Nixon's tenure, the school routinely achieved 70% or more of students attaining five A*-C grade GCSEs, including in English and maths, was ranked among the top 100 non-selective comprehensive schools in the UK, and was noted for "valuing inclusiveness and egalitarianism". He was succeeded by David Jones, who served as interim headteacher in 2005-6, before the appointment of a permanent successor, Aydin Önaç. Önaç, who led the school in a very different direction in his three and a half years as headmaster 2006-9, told the Evening Standard of his contempt for the school's pre-existing ethos: "When I joined in April 2006, I inherited a school held back by an egalitarian mindset that was stuck in the Seventies."

==== Foundation status ====
In the summer of 2006, the school's governors and recently-appointed headteacher Aydin Önaç proposed to change the school's status to that of a foundation school. The governors argued that the increased autonomy from the LEA provided by foundation status would be beneficial to the school, while critics argued that the proposal was an attack on the school's comprehensive nature and would lead to a reduction in provision for pupils with special educational needs. On 1 September 2007, Fortismere became a foundation school – despite opposition from 70 per cent of parents and a petition from students demanding to be consulted on the changes. Önaç's reforms were marked by a conscious effort to attract middle-class children from affluent backgrounds in place of the racially and socially diverse communities that had previously made up the student body at Fortismere – he told the Evening Standard: "I estimate that a family with two children will save £250,000 in private school fees by sending them to us and [the school's sixth-form block] Tetherdown, and a family of four £500,000", and reflected that after he had been in post for two years implementing his reforms, "most families here are wealthy or middle-class".

An early reform by Önaç in 2006 was scrapping the school's previous policy of mixed-ability classrooms, and "setting" the pupils by ability for all subjects, prompting accusations from parents that poorly-performing students were being segregated and neglected. In September 2009, Önaç altered the comprehensive school's entry criteria, removing 10% of the school's places previously allocated to children from the local community, and instead reserving them for musically gifted children – a policy described as 'elitist', favouring children with wealthier parents who had been able to pay for private music tuition before the age of 11.

Önaç was also criticised for a policy towards children with special needs. Ten children were affected by the policy, which reduced personnel in what had been a well-staffed special needs department, and breached legal requirements concerning the hours of support provided to children. Parents sought a judicial review of Önaç's approach to special needs provision, but in December 2009 abruptly he resigned from his post mid-academic year, soon after the legal action started. The action was subsequently discontinued and special needs provision improved after Önaç's departure. Önaç resigned to take up the headmastership of the selective St Olave's Grammar School in September 2010, although after his suspension and resignation there amidst legal action in 2017, a Bromley London Borough Council inquiry found that he had knowingly carried out a series of unlawful policies throughout his time as headteacher there, including the unlawful exclusion of underperforming students in a bid to boost the school's league table rankings: The Times divulged that Freedom of Information requests revealed 72 A-Level students had been forced out during Önaç's tenure at St Olave's. Parents at Fortismere would later liken Önaç's actions at St Olave's to his earlier actions at Fortismere.

==== Vertical tutoring and colleges ====
Under the leadership of headteacher Helen Glass, Fortismere adopted a vertical tutoring system in September 2012. Under the new system, students were sorted into tutor groups that consist of students from Years 7–11. The school also introduced a college system. Following an online vote, it was decided that the new 'colleges' would be named after the surnames of great writers and scientists. There were five 'colleges': Franklin, Keats, Selvon, Turing, and Wollstonecraft. Some two years after Helen Glass stepped down as headteacher, co-headteachers Jo Davey and Zoe Judge revised the previous model, with a horizontal tutoring system implemented, along with a focus on grouping students by year groups, contrary to the previous college system.

==== Madame Peng Liyuan visit ====
On 21 October 2015, China's first lady, Madame Peng Liyuan, was welcomed to Fortismere School by Schools Minister Nick Gibb, together with staff and students, as part of the official China state visit. The staff and students of Fortismere, which is notable for its Mandarin teaching, performed Chinese Mandarin poems and songs for Peng Liyuan. The visit followed an announcement made by Chancellor George Osborne in September 2015, that a £10 million investment would be made to allow more children to learn Mandarin at school.

== Campus ==
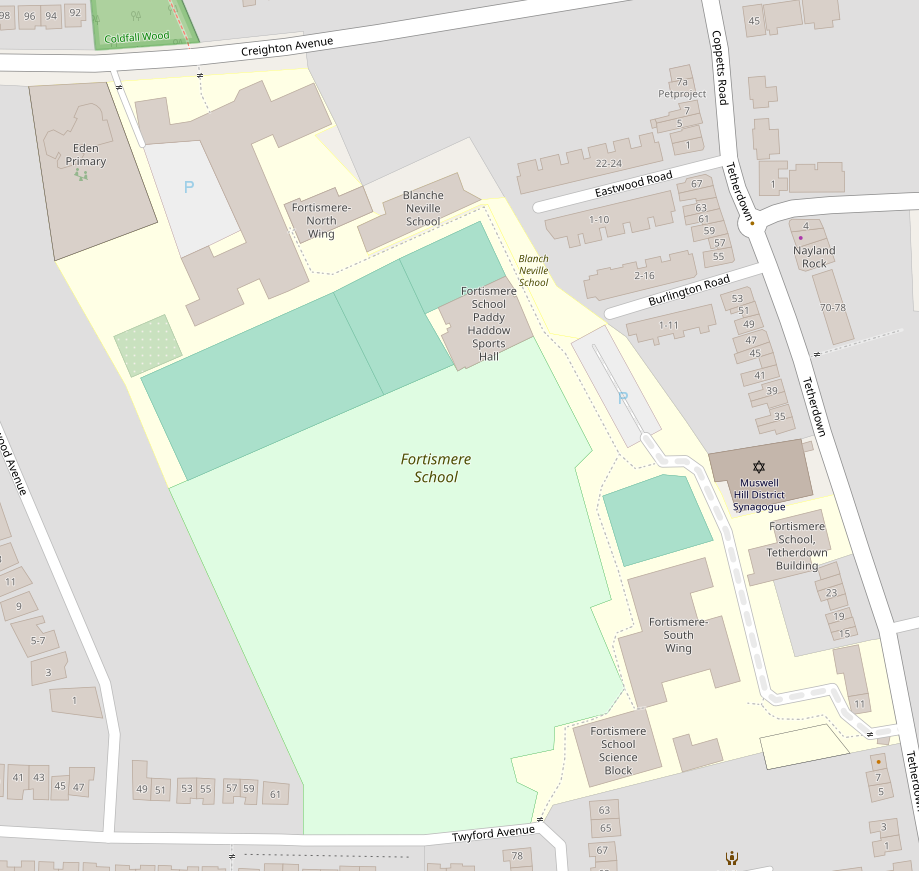
The Fortismere site, showing the two main wings, Blanche Nevile School and Eden Primary

The school occupies extensive grounds a little west of the centre of Muswell Hill. There are two main buildings on the site, the North Wing focuses mainly on English, Modern Languages and the Arts, with a separate music block, and South Wing which mainly focuses on Maths, Sciences and Humanities with a separate science block. The Wings are separated by playing fields, a sports hall, astroturf and tennis courts.

A sixth form building is adjacent to the South Wing, situated just inside the Tetherdown entrance. There are main entrances in Twyford Avenue (South Wing), Tetherdown (South Wing), and Creighton Avenue (North Wing).

=== Relationship with Blanche Nevile School ===
The secondary school part of the Blanche Nevile School for Deaf Children is located on the site of Fortismere School. The two schools maintain a strong partnership and are connected to the same computer server.

== Governance ==
The instrument of government requires 12 governors: one local authority governor; four parent governors elected by the parents; one staff governor; two partnership governors; three co-opted and the headteacher. There are four sub-committees: Curriculum, Physical Resources, Resources and Admissions.

== Admissions ==
As a foundation school, Fortismere sets its own admission procedure. The duty to have a fair admissions procedure was defined by the School Standards and Framework Act 1998. All students are funded by their local authority. For year 7 entry in 2024-25 it has a published admissions number of 270 which is a ten form entry of 27 pupils per form. Applications are made through the local authority transfer procedure system.

Year 12 entry is dependent on students having five level 5 GCSEs or better, including English and Maths. For some courses, requirements may vary. There are a minimum of 50 extra places available for students transferring from other schools.

== Curriculum ==
As of 2010, the school follows the National Curriculum in Years 7–11 and offers a broad range of GCSEs, (national exams which are taken by students aged 14–16) and A-levels (national exams taken by pupils aged 16–18). The school has no affiliation with a particular religious denomination, but as is required by law, religious education is given throughout the school, and students may opt to take the subject as part of their GCSE options.

Key Stage 3 of the National Curriculum is covered during years 7, 8 and 9, though most subjects will commence using Key Stage 4 (i.e. GCSE) material during year 9. The 'Core Key Stage 3 Subjects' are English, Mathematics and Science. The Foundation Subjects are Art & Design, Geography, History, Music, Physical Education, Technology, Information Technology, Modern Languages. Additional Subjects are Religious Education, Drama and Wellbeing. The five cross-curricular themes are Careers, Wellbeing, Economic and industrial awareness, Environmental education and Health education.

Key Stage 4 students study up to 10 GCSEs, depending on their ability. There are four core subjects studied by all students and four options delivered by a varied options system. This allows for the study of three separate sciences, as well as two languages and a range of courses, including vocational options. French, German, Spanish and Mandarin are offered. The English Baccalaureate will be awarded to any pupil who secures good GCSE or iGCSE passes (C and above) in all of the following subject areas: English, Maths, two sciences (which includes computer science), a foreign language, history or geography. This qualification is of particular interest to Russell Group universities.

In addition to the subjects studied at Key Stage 3, Business Studies, Economics, ICT to include ECDL, Media Studies, Music Technology, Sports Studies, Health and Fitness, Photography, Engineering, Fashion and Textiles, Food and Catering, Performing Arts, Princes trust (Certificate), and Sociology are offered.

Students who opt to stay on after sixteen study for BTEC or A levels. The following courses are offered Biology, Chemistry, Classical Civilisation, Computer Science, Drama & Theatre Studies, Economics, English, Film Studies, Fine Art, Geography, History, Mandarin Pre-U, Maths, Further Maths, Media Studies, French, Spanish, German, Music, Music Technology, Philosophy (including Philosophy of Religion), Photography, Physics, Politics, Product Design, Psychology, Sociology. Entry to each course is dependent on GCSE exam grades. Students who fail to obtain a good AS-level pass, are advised to retake it before continuing the A level course in year 13.

== Notable alumni ==
- Anum Bandey, Olympic swimmer
- Haris Bandey, Olympic swimmer
- Joel Defries, former co-presenter of BBC's Blue Peter children's TV programme
- Jess Glynne, singer-songwriter
- Michael Kiwanuka, soul singer, completed his A-levels in 2005
- Girl Ray, indie rock band
- Jacob Scipio, Actor
- Ed Skrein, actor

=== Tollington School ===
- Felix Aprahamian, classical music concert organiser
- Jennifer Bate, concert organist
- Kenneth Alfred Biggs, army officer
- Mark Hollis, singer-songwriter
- W. J. MacQueen-Pope, theatre historian

=== Tollington Grammar School ===
- Michael Casson, potter
- Maurice Saatchi, Baron Saatchi, businessman, politician and husband of Josephine Hart
- Anne Weyman, chief executive from 1996 to 2008 of the Family Planning Association

=== William Grimshaw Secondary Modern School ===
- Dave Davies, rock singer
- Sir Ray Davies, rock singer
- Pete Quaife, rock bassist
- Sir Rod Stewart, rock singer

=== Creighton Comprehensive School ===
- Kate Osamor, Labour Party politician
- Toby Young, political commentator
