= Michael Lewis (musician) =

American musician

- Born: Michael Lewis
- Origin: Minneapolis, Minnesota, U.S.
- Genres: Indie rock, jazz
- Occupation: Musician
- Instruments: Saxophone; upright bass; bass guitar
- Years active: 1997–present
- Member of: Happy Apple; Fat Kid Wednesdays; Bon Iver; Alpha Consumer
- Formerly of: Fog

Michael Lewis is an American saxophonist and bassist from Minneapolis, Minnesota. He is a founding member of the contemporary jazz groups Happy Apple and Fat Kid Wednesdays. He plays electric bass in Alpha Consumer and saxophone in Bon Iver. He is also a member of the group Gayngs and formerly the hip hop group Fog.

Lewis has recorded and performed live with Andrew Bird's band as well as Dosh. He has also recorded with the Tallest Man on Earth.

== Discography ==
=== Happy Apple ===
- Blown Shockwaves & Crash Flow (1997)
- Part of the Solutionproblem (1998)
- Body Popping Moon Walking Top Rocking (1999)
- Jazzercise with the Elders/E Equals What I Says It Does/God Bless Certain Portions of the USA (2000)
- Please Refrain from Fronting (2001)
- Youth Oriented (2003)
- The Peace Between Our Companies (2004)
- Happy Apple Back on Top (2007)
- New York CD (2020)
- Nothin' But Net: Live 1998–2000 (2021)

=== Fat Kid Wednesdays ===
- Set One (2002)
- The Art of Cherry (2004)
- Singles (2006)

=== Fog ===
- Ether Teeth (2003)
- Hummer (2004)
- 10th Avenue Freakout (2005)
- Loss Leader (2006)
- Ditherer (2007)
- For Good (2016)

=== Redstart ===
- One (2002)
- So Far from Over (2004)

=== Alpha Consumer ===
- Alpha Consumer (2006)
- Gary Victorsen's (2008)
- Kick Drugs Out of America (2011)
- Meat (2014)

=== Chris Morrissey Quartet ===
- The Morning World (2009)
- North Hero (2013)

=== Gayngs ===
- Relayted (2010)

=== Bryan Nichols Quintet ===
- Bright Places (2011)

=== Bon Iver ===
- Bon Iver, Bon Iver (2011)
- 22, A Million (2016)
- i,i (2019)
- Sable (2024)

=== Gramma's Boyfriend ===
- Human Eye (2013)

=== Other contributions ===
Dosh

- Pure Trash (2004)
- The Lost Take (2006)
- Wolves and Wishes (2008)
- Tommy (2010)
- Milk Money (2013)
- Tomorrow 1972 (2021)

Andrew Bird

- Noble Beast (2009)
- Break It Yourself (2012)

Haley Bonar

- Golder (2011)
- Pleasureland (2018)

The Tallest Man on Earth

- Dark Bird Is Home (2015)
