= Tommy (Dosh album) =

Studio album by Dosh
- Released: April 13, 2010
- Genres: Post-rock, instrumental hip-hop
- Length: 43:57
- Label: Anticon

Dosh chronology
Wolves and Wishes (2008)	Tommy (2010)	Milk Money (2013)

Professional ratings
Aggregate scores
Source	Rating
Metacritic	76/100
Review scores
Source	Rating
AllMusic	3/5 stars
The A.V. Club	A−
Cokemachineglow	78/100
Pitchfork	6.9/10
PopMatters	7/10 stars
The Skinny	4/5 stars
URB	4/5 stars

Tommy is the fifth solo studio album by American multi-instrumentalist Dosh. It was released on Anticon on April 13, 2010.

Andrew Bird contributed vocals on "Number 41" and "Nevermet". "Airlift" contains a sample of Dosh and his friend covering "Run Like Hell" by Pink Floyd. The album is named after and dedicated to Tom Cesario.

== Critical reception ==
At Metacritic, which assigns a weighted average score out of 100 to reviews from mainstream critics, the album received an average score of 76% based on 11 reviews, indicating "generally favorable reviews".

Zach Cole of URB gave the album 4 stars out of 5, saying, "Dosh's focus on Tommy falls on the elegance of the music first and foremost, and the tracks evoke warmth as they evolve in sequence." He added, "Dosh pays particular attention to the delicate balance of the instruments on each track, making sure that no one sound overpowers another." M. R. Newmark of PopMatters gave the album 7 stars out of 10, saying: "This is Dosh taking a step back, slowing down, freaking out a little (check the snarling ending of album finale 'Gare de Lyon'), and making the most personal music of his career."

== Track listing ==
All tracks are written by Martin Dosh, except where noted.

No.	Title	Length
1.	"Subtractions"	4:18
2.	"Yer Face"	3:22
3.	"Number 41" (Dosh, Andrew Bird)	3:04
4.	"Town Mouse"	3:09
5.	"Loud" (Mike Lewis)	3:31
6.	"Airlift"	3:58
7.	"Country Road X" (Dosh, Ryan Francesconi)	5:05
8.	"Call the Kettle"	5:38
9.	"Nevermet" (Dosh, Bird)	3:23
10.	"Gare de Lyon" (Dosh, Andrew Broder, Everest, Bryan Olson)	8:29

== Personnel ==
Credits adapted from liner notes.

- Martin Dosh – everything else
- Mike Lewis – backing vocals (1, 3), saxophone (1, 4, 8), synthesizer (2), piano (3, 5, 6, 7), bass guitar (5, 8, 10), glockenspiel (5)
- Jeremy Ylvisaker – electric guitar (2, 3, 4, 5, 6), backing vocals (3), synthesizer (3), slide guitar (8), feedback guitar (10)
- Ryan Francesconi – accordion (7), guitar (7, 8, 9, 10), bass guitar (7, 9), banjo (10), tambura (10)
- Mike Sopko – acoustic guitar (1), electric guitar (1)
- Chris Morrissey – electric bass (1, 4, 6)
- Todd Sickafoose – acoustic bass (2, 9)
- Jon Davis – microphone (3), bass sample (3)
- Paul Niehaus – pedal steel guitar (3)
- Andrew Bird – vocals (3, 9), lyrics (3, 9)
- Bryan Olson – guitar (4)
- Derek Phillips – drums (4)
- Freddy Votel – percussion (5, 8, 10)
- J.T. Bates – cymbal (6)
- Tim Glenn – prepared piano (7)
