= 10th Avenue Freakout =

Studio album by Fog
- Released: March 22, 2005
- Genre: Indie rock
- Length: 58:32
- Label: Lex Records
- Producer: Andrew Broder; Tom Herbers

Fog chronology
Ether Teeth (2003)	10th Avenue Freakout (2005)	Ditherer (2007)

10th Avenue Freakout is the third studio album by American indie rock band Fog. It was released on Lex Records on March 22, 2005.

== Critical reception ==
Professional ratings
Aggregate scores
Source	Rating
Metacritic	78/100
Review scores
Source	Rating
AllMusic	4/5 stars
Billboard	favorable
Cokemachineglow	61/100
Pitchfork	6.8/10
Stylus Magazine	C+
XLR8R	favorable

At Metacritic, which assigns a weighted average score out of 100 to reviews from mainstream critics, 10th Avenue Freakout received an average score of 78, based on 11 reviews, indicating "generally favorable reviews".

Ben Peterson of AllMusic gave the album 4 stars out of 5, describing it as "a rhythmic, up-front electronic-pop album, much less pensive and subdued than Fog's previous full-length, Ether Teeth." He called it "consistently imaginative and never predictable." Liz Cordingley of XLR8R said: "Volleying between forceful and quirky, the avant-garde approach of this album gets closer to the human side of jazz than any digitized hip-hop beat." Ron Hart of Billboard called it "the most adventurous work in the Fog catalog yet."

== Track listing ==
No.	Title	Length
1.	"Can You Believe It?"	2:58
2.	"We're Winning"	3:31
3.	"10th Avenue Freakout"	4:38
4.	"The Rabbit"	4:39
5.	"Song About a Wedding"	4:15
6.	"Holy! Holy! Holy!"	4:57
7.	"The Small Burn"	6:15
8.	"Hummer"	3:19
9.	"O Telescope"	3:24
10.	"Goody Gumdrops"	3:00
11.	"The Poor Fella"	6:12
12.	"A Murder"	5:11
13.	"The Hully Gully"	6:13
Total length:		58:32

== Personnel ==
Credits adapted from liner notes.

Fog

- Andrew Broder – lyrics, music, production, engineering, front cover concept
- Jeremy Ylvisaker – music, engineering
- Mark Erickson – lyrics (2), music
- Martin Dosh – music
- Michael Lewis – music
- Tim Glenn – music

Additional personnel

- Greg Lewis – trumpet (1), horns (2)
- Huntley Miller – processing (2, 4, 11, 13)
- George Cartwright – saxophone (3, 4, 12, 13)
- Adam Linz – bass guitar (3, 11, 12)
- Jaqueline Ferrier-Ultan – cello (6, 11, 12)
- Andrew Lafkas – bass guitar (6, 13)
- Julie Wellman – lyrics (7), vocals (7, 8)
- Adam Drucker – lyrics (9)
- Tom Herbers – production, engineering
- Ehquestionmark – sleeve artwork
