= Wishingbone =

Studio album by Subtle
- Released: April 4, 2006
- Genre: Alternative hip hop
- Length: 40:22
- Label: Lex Records

Subtle chronology
Earthsick (2004)	Wishingbone (2006)	For Hero: For Fool (2006)

Professional ratings
Review scores
Source	Rating
XLR8R	Favorable

Wishingbone is the sister album to Subtle's first album A New White. It contains remixes and new material with other artists, including Mike Patton, Beck, and Andrew Border of Fog. Included with Wishingbone is a DVD including the videos for "F.K.O.", "The Long Vein of the Law" and "Swanmeat". All the videos on the DVD were animated by a group called SSSR. Several of the tracks originally appeared on the "F.K.O." and "The Long Vein of The Law" EPs.

== CD track Listing ==
1. "Swanmeat" (4:39)
2. Beck - "Farewell Ride (Subtle Remix)" (4:55)
3. "I Love L.A. II" feat. Hrvatski (3:44)
4. "By Hook" (2:30)
5. "The Longvein of Voice" feat. Mike Patton (4:25)
6. "F.K.O. (Console Remix)" (6:13)
7. Ms. John Soda - "I&#8217 (Subtle Remix)" (4:02)
8. "Swansong Meat" feat. Fog (9:49)

== DVD track listing ==
1. "F.K.O." Release Date: September 10, 2004 (3:50)
2. "The Long Vein of the Law" Release Date: October 2, 2004 (3:30)
3. "Swanmeat" Release Date: March 1, 2006 (4:34)
