= Summer (Subtle EP) =

EP by Subtle
- Released: 2001
- Genre: Electronic, indie hip hop
- Length: 20:03
- Label: A Purple 100

Subtle chronology
Summer (2001)	Autumn (2002)

Summer is the debut EP by American alternative hip hop sextet Subtle. It was released on A Purple 100 in 2001.

The tracks "Flying Horse Plans", "Eneby Kurs" and "The Teeth Behind the Wheel" also appear on Earthsick, a compilation of material from the group's Season EPs.

== Track listing ==
1. "Flying Horse Plans" – 4:12
2. "5second Segment" – 0:31
3. "Eneby Kurs" – 5:31
4. "Been Shelled" – 1:29
5. "Boxgod" – 3:53
6. "The Teeth Behind the Wheel" – 4:27
