= Autumn (EP) =

EP by Subtle
- Released: 2002
- Genre: Electronic, indie hip hop
- Length: 19:49
- Label: A Purple 100

Subtle chronology
Summer (2001)	Autumn (2002)	Winter (2002)

Autumn is the second EP by American alternative hip hop sextet Subtle. It was released in 2002 on the A Purple 100 label.

The tracks "Arsenic Chic" and "Earthsick" also appear on Earthsick, a compilation of material from the group's Season EPs.

== Track listing ==
1. "Coldcoals Camera Action" – 2:40
2. "Arsenic Chic" – 4:25
3. "Bluerose Charade" – 2:25
4. "6 Small Men in a Giant Robot" – 2:59
5. "Earthsick" – 7:20
