= Luke Redfield =

American musician, songwriter, and poet (born 1983)

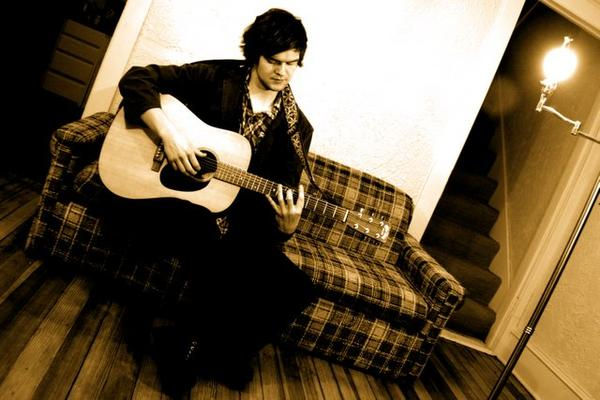
- Luke Redfield

Background information
- Born: 1983 (age 42–43)
- Origin: Duluth, Minnesota
- Genres: Folk, indie
- Instruments: Guitar, harmonica, banjo, piano
- Website: www.lukeredfieldmusic.com

Luke Redfield is an American musician, songwriter, and poet. He was born in Duluth, MN and has since been living all over the country. His songwriting is influenced by Bob Dylan, Townes Van Zandt, and Jack Kerouac, as well as his own experiences of living on the road.

Redfield's music combines elements of old blues, country, and folk with modern production aesthetics. Some of his better-known songs include Four Cities, Cowboy Song, Fields of Idaho, and Comeback Kids. Redfield's music appears in the TV series Californication and numerous independent films.

Redfield's studio recordings feature Haley Bonar and members of Andrew Bird, Bon Iver, and more. His newest LP, The Cartographer, was released in January 2015.

== Early life ==
Born in Duluth, Minnesota, Redfield grew up in the small towns of Cannon Falls and Kenyon. The son of a preacher, Redfield's family moved a lot during his youth, which also included a sojourn in Alliance, a railroad town located in the Nebraska Panhandle. In an interview with the Scottsbluff Star-Herald, Redfield attributed his vagabond spirit to his parents: "Dad’s lineage of Norwegian Viking and my ma’s Bohemian Gypsy blood pretty much cursed, or blessed, me to be a wanderer by nature...so I figured I’d write some songs along the way."

While dabbling in hip hop in his teens, Redfield heard a cassette copy of Bob Dylan's Highway 61 Revisited in his dad's Buick and suddenly had an epiphany to switch genres. Teaching himself guitar, he became a folk-rock troubadour heavily influenced by Dylan's early work, as well as the albums Revival and Soul Journey, by Gillian Welch, and Nebraska, by Bruce Springsteen.

== Music career ==
In 2006, a young Redfield busked his way through Europe, sleeping in hostels and at homes of musician friends he met in London, Edinburgh, Oslo, Dublin, and Rome. Networking through Myspace, he got his first break when he was invited to open for London-based songwriter, Nick Harper.

Redfield returned to the United States in 2007 and booked his first tour, which consisted of solo acoustic bar gigs and street performances from Minneapolis to Austin, TX, where Redfield ended up living. It was on this trip that Redfield and his traveling pal, Drew Swenhaugen, met Willie Nelson, Riders in the Sky, and Kesha, whose family treated the boys to backstage passes at the Grand Ole Opry.

In summer 2008, Redfield sojourned in Homer, Alaska, where he lived a Thoreau-like lifestyle without the conveniences of modernity. Living in a seven-by-seven foot shack nicknamed "The Birdhouse," Redfield used this meditative time for self-inquiry and wrote some his most stirring material to date, including the song "Find Me in the Light," which attempts to explain Nondualism in layman's terms.

Redfield's music was first recognized in Minneapolis, Minnesota, where he released his debut LP, Ephemeral Eon, in March 2010. Minnesota Public Radio and Cities 97 continue to play its tracks, some of which were co-produced and mixed by Eyedea and feature accompaniment by Jeremy Ylvisaker and Haley Bonar. Redfield was "Picked 2 Click" by City Pages in August 2010 and Ephemeral Eon earned honorable mention on critic Rob Van Alstyne's list of the year's best local records.

In 2012, Redfield released his sophomore LP, Tusen Takk, which was mixed by The Mountain Goats' producer, Brandon Eggleston, and features members of Peter Wolf Crier, Bon Iver, and Andrew Bird's band. The A.V. Club called the album "A zoom out from traditional folk and country music, and an infusion of a broader, sweeping style."

In 2013, Redfield put out East of Santa Fe, a poignant nine-track LP, which City Pages described as "so sparse that the listener is worried that Redfield could fall apart at any moment," while The Star Tribune called it "atmospheric" and "horizon-gazing." His newest LP, The Cartographer, was released in January 2015, followed up by an EP, Uncover the Magic.

== Disc golf ==
Redfield is a professional disc golfer who has had moderate success on the PDGA tour, competing against Ken Climo and others. He is known for his unique sidearm and tomahawk throwing techniques. His PDGA number is 19123.

== Discography ==
As Artist:

- Ephemeral Eon (2010)
- Tusen Takk (2012)
- East of Santa Fe (2013)
- The Cartographer (2015)
- Uncover the Magic (2015)
