= Girl Ray =

British indie rock band

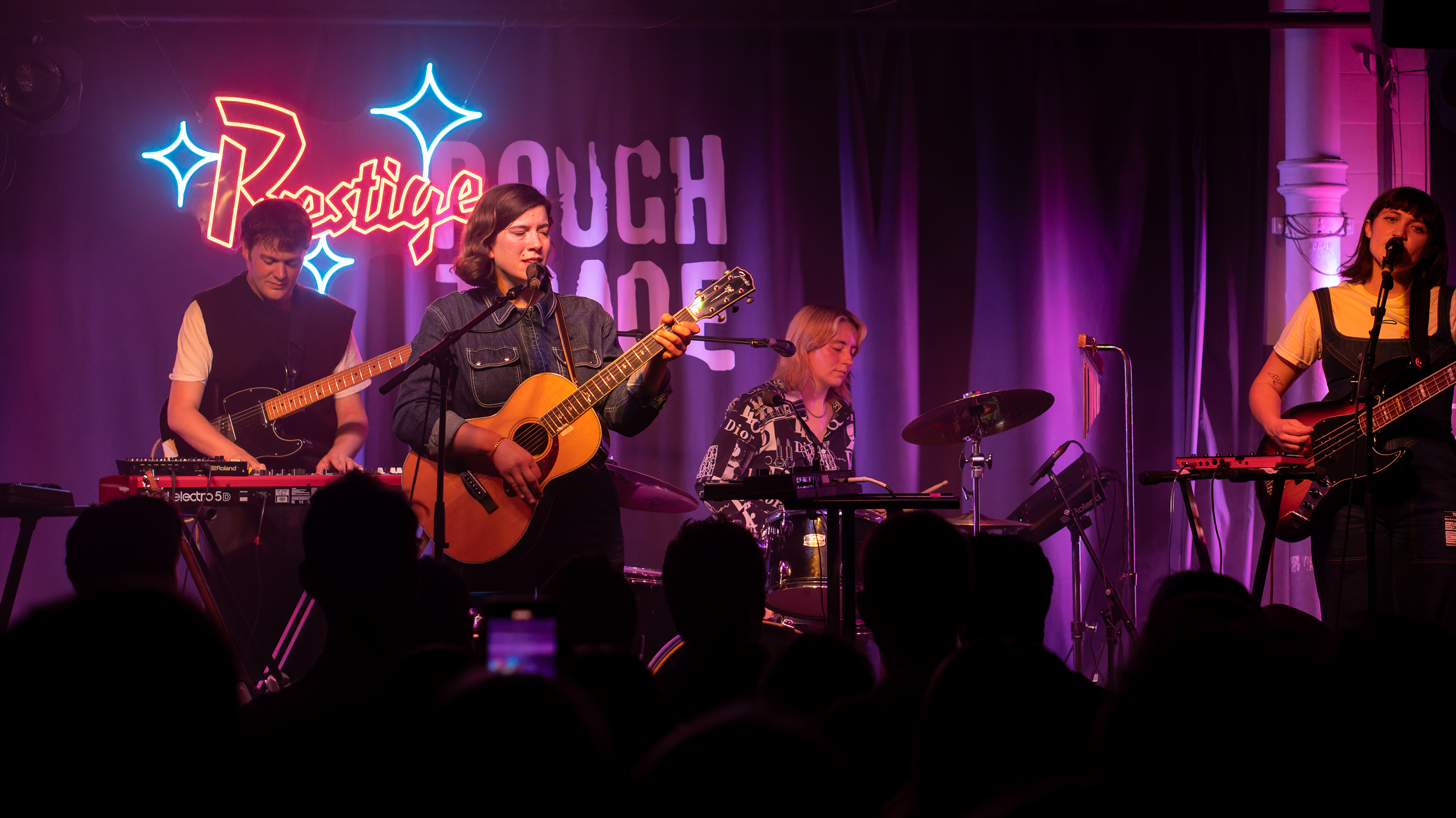
- Girl Ray's Prestige album launch show at Rough Trade East, 4 August 2023

Background information
- Years active: 2015–present
- Label: Moshi Moshi
- Members: Poppy Hankin; Iris McConnell; Sophie Moss
- Website: www.girlray.co.uk

Girl Ray are a British indie rock band formed in 2015 in North London. The band comprises Poppy Hankin, Iris McConnell and Sophie Moss. They have released three studio albums: Earl Grey (2017), Girl (2019) and Prestige (2023). Their debut album Earl Grey was named Stereogum and Under the Radar's "Album of the Week", and made Under the Radar's top debut albums and top 100 albums of 2017 lists.

== History ==
=== Formation and debut album (2015–2017) ===
Poppy Hankin, Iris McConnell and Sophie Moss met as students at Fortismere School in Muswell Hill, North London. The trio began playing music together in their first year of sixth form, at age 16 and for a year played small gigs under different names, including "Sturdy Shelf" and "Ghosty Mo" before settling on the name "Girl Ray" (a play on the name of surrealist artist Man Ray).

In 2016, Girl Ray released their first official single, "I'll Make This Fun" and recorded a session for Marc Riley's BBC Radio 6 Music show. The band's second single, "Trouble" had a limited 7" physical release through the Moshi Moshi Records Singles Club on 25 November that year.

Prior to the release of their debut album, the band toured as support for Haley McCallum, Our Girl, Slow Club, Ezra Furman, Porches, and Teleman. In March 2017, the trio played the BBC Radio 6 Music Festival in Glasgow and later that year made appearances at the Green Man and End of the Road festivals.

Earl Grey, the group's debut album, was released on 4 August 2017 by Moshi Moshi. The album was named "Album of the Week by Stereogum and Under the Radar and received positive reviews from critics. It placed third on Under the Radar's top 15 debut albums of 2017 and 38th on their overall top albums of 2017 list.

=== Girl (2017–2019) ===
Girl Ray's first single post-Earl Grey was "(I Wish I Were Giving You a Gift) This Christmas", released on 8 December 2017 as 7-inch vinyl. The following year, "The Way We Came Back" was released, a song Hankin originally wrote when she was 16.

For the band's second album, Girl, Girl Ray moved away from the twee influences of their debut release, with a more pop and R&B sound. Rapper PSwuave featured on the song "Takes Time". Ash Workman produced the album, which was recorded at Electric Beach Studios in Margate. Girl was released on 22 November 2019 via Moshi Moshi Records and received mixed reviews from critics.

Girl Ray supported Metronomy on their UK tour in autumn 2019.

=== Prestige (2019–2023) ===
Work began on Girl Ray's third album, Prestige, whilst on tour in Europe in early 2020. Hankin recorded demos after binging the TV series Pose, which inspired the album's disco sound and aesthetic, and the album was written during lockdown.

Whilst working on Prestige, Girl Ray released several song covers. In 2021, the band covered "Murder on the Dancefloor" by Sophie Ellis-Bextor, with the proceeds from the release going to Hackney Night Shelter and in 2022 they covered "Another Try" by Haim for Under the Radar's Cover of Covers album.

Prestige was released on 4 August 2023 by Moshi Moshi. The album was co-produced by Ben H Allen and was recorded in Allen's Atlanta studio. Al Doyle and Joe Goddard of Hot Chip also produced on the album. Critics reviewed the album positively. To celebrate the album's release, Girl Ray DJ'd a club night at the George Tavern.

In October 2023, Girl Ray released the single "Hurt So Bad". The song was written during the COVID-19 pandemic alongside Prestige, when the band considering a house sound for the album.

Girl Ray set out on a UK and Europe tour in November 2023.

== Musical style ==
Girl Ray have been compared to Carole King, Haim, Pavement, Gorky's Zygotic Mynci, The Raincoats, Courtney Barnett and This Is the Kit. Hankin's vocal delivery has been described as "deadpan". Tara Joshi of The Guardian observed that their sound has become increasingly pop-oriented with each album, describing their debut as indie-adjacent, Girl as R&B-influenced, and Prestige as moving toward "full strutting disco and 80s-style synthpop".

== Members ==
- Poppy Hankin – vocals, guitar (2015–present)
- Iris McConnell – drums (2015–present)
- Sophie Moss – bass (2015–present)

== Discography ==
=== Albums ===
- Earl Grey (2017)
- Girl (2019)
- Prestige (2023)

=== Singles ===
- "I'll Make This Fun" (2016)
- "Trouble" (2016)
- "Stupid Things" (2017)
- "Preacher" (2017)
- "Don't Go Back at Ten" (2017)
- "(I Wish I Were Giving You a Gift) This Christmas" (2017)
- "The Way We Came Back" (2018)
- "Show Me More" (2019)
- "Girl" (2019)
- "Hurt So Bad" (2023)
