= Gail Archer (organist) =

American organist, music director

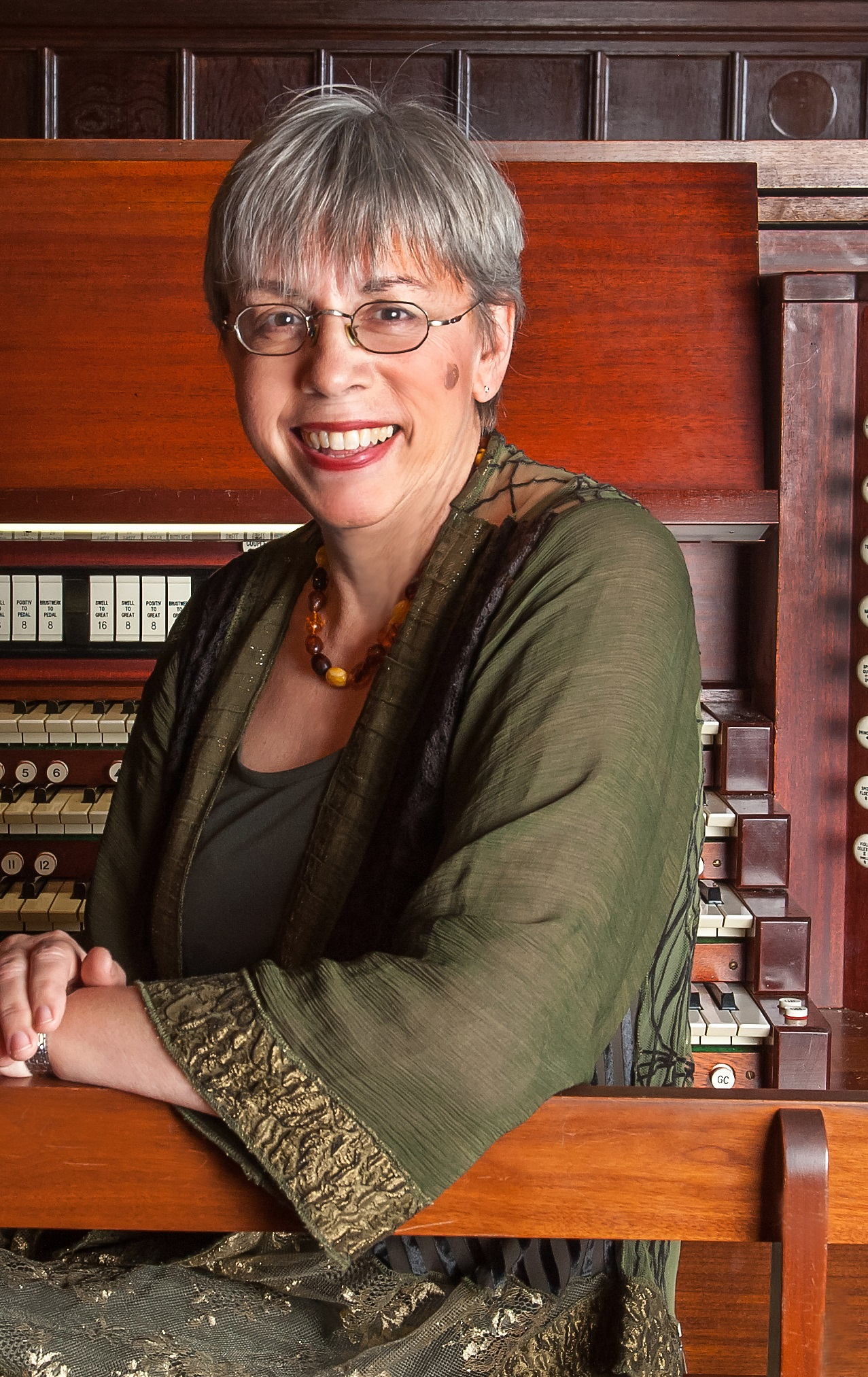
- Born: Paterson, New Jersey
- Occupations: Organist, music director and academic

Academic background
- Education: B.A., Music Education; M.A., Piano; M.M., Choral Conducting; DMA, Organ Performance; Artist Diploma, Organ Performance
- Alma mater: Montclair State University; University of Hartford; Mannes School of Music; Manhattan School of Music; Boston Conservatory at Berklee

Academic work
- Institutions: Barnard College, Columbia University
- Website: http://www.gailarcher.com/

Gail Archer is an American organist, music director, choral conductor and an academic. She is a professor of Professional Practice at Barnard College, Columbia University and the founder of an international forum for women organists called Musforum. She directs the ‘Barnard-Columbia Chorus & Chamber Choir’ and the ‘Music Program’ of Barnard College, Columbia University, and is College Organist of Vassar College.

Archer's musical work spans from the 17th to the 21st century, with performances on instruments of the Baroque and Romantic periods. Her work has been compiled in several CDs, including Chernivtsi, A Russian Journey, Franz Liszt: A Hungarian Rhapsody, and The Muse's Voice, among others. Archer's solo debut CD, ‘The Orpheus of Amsterdam: Sweelinck and his Pupils’, was released in 2006. Archer conducts annual recital series based on musical themes. Her recital series The Muse's Voice, Max Reger: The Last Romantic, An American Idyll, Liszt and Bach.

Archer was the first American woman to play Olivier Messiaen's complete work at his centennial. Time Out New York recognized her work as ‘Best of 2008’ in classical music and opera. She has also received the Teaching Excellence Award at Barnard College. Archer is a member of American Choral Directors Association, American Guild of Organists and International Alliance of Women in Music.

== Education ==
Archer graduated magna cum laude in Music Education from Montclair State University in 1973. She completed her master's degree in Piano from University of Hartford in 1977 before joining Yale University as a Research Fellow.

In 1987, Archer received her Master of Music degree in Choral Conducting from Mannes College of Music. She became a Doctor of Musical Arts in Organ Performance from Manhattan School of Music in 1995. In 2002, Archer received her artist diploma for Organ Performance from Boston Conservatory.

== Career ==
Archer started her part-time musical career in 1986 as a performer at Church of the Epiphany. She then performed at All Saints Episcopal Church from 1997 till 2004 and was associated with St. Mel R. C. Church in the following year. She did one year stints at St. Teresa R. C. Church and St. Matthew & St. Timothy Episcopal Church from 2005 till 2007. Archer was appointed as College Organist at Vassar College in 2007.

During her European tour in the 2010s, Archer performed at venues such as Santa Maria del Fiore in Italy, St. Wenceslaus Church in Czech Republic, St. Paul's Church, Odesa in Ukraine and Holmen Church in Denmark. She also performed at UNESCO World Heritage site of San Vitale church in Italy.

Archer was appointed as Director of Barnard-Columbia Chorus and Chamber Choir in 1988 and as Director of the Music Program at Barnard College in 1994.

== Performances ==
=== The Orpheus of Amsterdam ===
Archer's album, The Orpheus of Amsterdam was released in 2005. The American Organist reviewed that "Gail Archer's ebullient enthusiasm for this music is clearly evident. She elicits the technical brilliance, humor and earthly and spiritual qualities inherent in the music." According to American Record Guide, "she reveals herself as an organist of exemplary taste by thoughtful phrasing and articulation and imaginative, resourceful registrations".

=== A Mystic in the Making ===
Archer released "A Mystic in the Making" in 2007. James Hildreth reviewed that "Dr. Archer plays these formidable works with authority, assertiveness and rhythmic exactitude" and that "her registrations reflect the spirit of Messiaen's coloristic requirements". All Music Guide reviewed that "Archer plays with just the right combination of precision and rhythmic fluidity that the music needs to dance and soar." According to Toronto Star, "Gail Archer has become one of the world's few star concert organists".

=== Messiaen Performance ===
Archer played the complete work of Olivier Messiaen at his centennial in 2008. Lucid Culture reviews that Archer "played all eighteen parts of Olivier Messiaen's complete Livre du Saint Sacrement with extraordinary grace and fluidity" and that the performance was "without question one of the highlights of the many concerts going on around town this year in honor of the Messiaen centenary" The New York Times reviewed that "Archer played with an unflagging power and assertiveness" and "within Ms. Archer's vivid, muscular performance, in fact, were moments of striking simplicity."

=== Franz Liszt: A Hungarian Rhapsody ===
Archer released her album Franz Liszt: A Hungarian Rhapsody in 2011. This album was reviewed by The Diapason as "a highly recommended recording for the serious lover of the organ works of Franz Liszt." The article also stated that "it takes a great technique to play the organ works of Liszt; Gail Archer is certainly up to the task and does so brilliantly on this recording."

=== The Muse's Voice: A Celebration of Women Composers ===
In 2014, Archer released, The Muse's Voice: A Celebration of Women Composers. Lori Ardovino, while reviewing "Te Deum" from the album, stated that "The piece demonstrates Demessieux's knowledge of the organ's sonorous capabilities, and it provides ample opportunities for Archer to display her own dexterity, musicianship, and virtuosity". She stated that Archer "deftly navigates the various stylistic and technical requirements" associated with The Peacock's Throne.

=== A Russian Journey ===
Archer released her album, A Russian Journey, in 2017. Music Web International reviewed that Archer "creates a really rousing and exhilarating performance". The article also states that "this disc introduces us to works that are rarely if ever programmed" and that "This is a must for organ lovers." Gramophone reviewed that "The superb musicianship, masterly technique and programming savvy informing the American organist Gail Archer's previous Meyer Media releases prevail throughout A Russian Journey" Classical Modern Music reviewed that "The performances by Gail Archer have heart and expressionist aplomb" and that the "organ version of Night on Bald Mountain is fabulous and revelatory"

=== Chernivtsi ===
Archer released her recording of contemporary Ukrainian organ music album by the name of Chernivtsi in 2020. On reviewing Benedictus: Song of Zachariah from the album, New York Music Daily stated that "it is an interesting piece of music, beginning as a similarly enigmatic fanfare and warming to a chuffing rondo requiring precision as pointillistic as it can possibly get on this instrument: Archer rises to the challenge."

== Awards and honors ==
- 1999-2000 - Teaching Excellence Award, Barnard College
- 2008 - Time-Out New York "Best of 2008" in Classical music and opera for the Messiaen cycle
- 2017 - Elected faculty member of Harriman Institute, Columbia University
