= Dosh (album) =

Studio album by Dosh
- Released: 2002
- Recorded: July 2000–October 2001
- Genres: Post-rock, instrumental hip-hop
- Length: 48:11
- Labels: Dinkytown Records, Anticon
- Producers: Ben Durrant, Dosh, Jeremy Ylvisaker

Dosh chronology
Dosh (2002)	Pure Trash (2004)

Professional ratings
Review scores
Source	Rating
East Bay Express	favorable
Pitchfork	7.4/10

Dosh is the first solo studio album by American multi-instrumentalist Dosh. Originally released on Dinkytown Records in 2002, it was re-released on Anticon in 2003. It peaked at number 142 on the CMJ Radio 200 chart.

== Critical reception ==
Chris Dahlen of Pitchfork gave the album a 7.4 out of 10, saying: "Each track sounds careful but chaotic, simple but extreme, as Dosh shines the spotlight on himself and then dissolves into a dozen layers of movement." He added: "More than a drum recital or a set of nice tunes, Dosh's debut is a showcase where he can craft meticulous tracks and then blitz them with spontaneous joy." Dave Segal of East Bay Express said: "His self-titled debut album serves as a calling card to procure work with hot vocalists or MCs seeking a crafty producer with unconventional skills to burn." He called it "a deft display of technical prowess that's begging for an adventurous singer or rapper."

== Track listing ==
No.	Title	Length
1.	"Water Turn Off Notice"	3:58
2.	"You Can't Make Me Cry"	4:52
3.	"Song for Zelbert Moore"	3:38
4.	"DJ DJ"	4:46
5.	"India India"	2:59
6.	"My Favorite Color's Red"	2:59
7.	"My Girl's Ex-Car"	3:09
8.	"Chuck, Jane"	4:20
9.	"Steve the Cat"	4:13
10.	"If I Could Sing"	3:03
11.	"Party Tractor"	3:25
12.	"Forgot Myself"	6:49
