= Tollington School =

Former grammar school in Muswell Hill, London, England

Location
- Tetherdown; Muswell Hill, London, N9 9TN; England; 51.59285°N 0.15095°W

Information
- Type: Grammar school
- Motto: Virtute et labore (Latin: Energy and hard work)
- Established: Stroud Green 1879; Muswell Hill 1901-1967
- Founder: William Brown
- Local authority: Hornsey Borough Council, latterly London Borough of Haringey
- Headmaster: S. Allder, MA (Cantab)
- Gender: Coeducational
- Age: 11 to 18
- Houses: Names of girls and boys houses, as combined in 1957: Royden-Lawrenson; Astor-Davies; Normanton-Hodgson; Evans-Hicox
- Colours: Green and gold
- Website: http://tollington.fortismere.haringey.sch.uk/index.html

Tollington School (1901-1967) was a selective, coeducational grammar school in Muswell Hill, London, England. For the present school on this site, see Fortismere School.

== Foundation ==
Tollington School of Muswell Hill, North London N10, was the final manifestation of Tollington Park College, a private educational establishment for boys founded by William Brown in 1879 in Tollington Park, London N4. The success and increasing complement of the college soon outgrew its home. Rapid population expansion around Muswell Hill created the need for a new school and the opportunity was seen by the founder's son Campbell Brown; in 1901 he established Tollington Boys School in Tetherdown, Muswell Hill.

== Tollington High School ==
In 1910 Tollington High School for girls was opened by Campbell Brown in nearby Collingwood Avenue. In 1919 both schools were purchased by London County Council, the local education authority. Aside from the senior management, the two schools operated independently.

== Tollington Grammar School ==
In 1957, boys and girls came together in Tollington School, a coeducational grammar school and a new building was erected on the playing fields of the boys school, opening in 1959. In 1967 Tollington and the neighbouring William Grimshaw secondary modern schools were merged to become Creighton (comprehensive) School and the original names expired.

The buildings are still in use today: the 100+ year-old original buildings and 1957 development in Tetherdown are now occupied by Fortismere School; the Collingwood Avenue site now houses Tetherdown Primary.

== Distinguished alumni ==
- Felix Aprahamian, classical music concert organiser
- Jennifer Bate OBE, concert organist
- Kenneth Biggs GC
- Edwin York Bowen, English composer and pianist
- Michael Casson OBE, potter
- Sir Henry Hallett Dale, President of the Royal Society and Nobel prizewinner
- Philip Davies OBE, FSA - author, founder & CEO Commonwealth Heritage Forum
- Ted Dicks, composer, incl. "Right Said Fred" and "A Windmill in Old Amsterdam"
- Chris Gilbey, music industry executive and composer
- Mark Hollis, lead singer of Talk Talk
- W. J. MacQueen-Pope, theatre historian
- Maurice Saatchi, Baron Saatchi, co-founder the advertising agency Saatchi and Saatch
- Rudolf Uhlenhaut, engineer, responsible for the Mercedes 300SLR Gull Wing
- Anne Weyman OBE, Chief Executive of the Family Planning Association, 1996-2008

== Old Tollingtonians Society ==
Tollington Schools are actively remembered by ex-pupils and staff, members of the Old Tollingtonians Society. The society preserves records and memorabilia of the school. Members of the society meet annually for a reunion in the assembly hall of the school (now Fortismere). Sadly, the last ever reunion was held at Tollington School on 12 October 2024.
