= Exiting Arm =

Studio album by Subtle
- Released: May 13, 2008
- Genre: Hip-hop
- Length: 46:01
- Label: Lex Records
- Producer: Subtle

Subtle chronology
For Hero: For Fool (2006)	Exiting Arm (2008)

Professional ratings
Aggregate scores
Source	Rating
Metacritic	75/100
Review scores
Source	Rating
AllMusic	3/5 stars
The A.V. Club	B
Drowned in Sound	8/10
Pitchfork	8.3/10
PopMatters	7/10
The Skinny	3/5 stars
Spin	7/10
The Stranger	4/4 stars

Exiting Arm (stylized as ExitingARM) is the third studio album by American hip-hop sextet Subtle. It was released on Lex Records in 2008. It is "the latest chapter in the story of Hour Hero Yes, the middle-class rapper whose rise and struggles are chronicled told on 2004's A New White and 2006's For Hero: For Fool."

== Critical reception ==
At Metacritic, which assigns a weighted average score out of 100 to reviews from mainstream critics, the album received an average score of 75% based on 14 reviews, indicating "generally favorable reviews".

Christopher Bahn of The A.V. Club gave the album a grade of B, writing, "Musically, ExitingARM is just as layered, blenderizing beats, sampled electronic noise, and Doseone's easygoing, flowing words into a package that's sometimes electrifying and sometimes confounding." Eric Grandy of The Stranger said, "Throughout ExitingARM, frontman Doseone remains an inscrutable MC, quick-tongued and verbose, and an unassuming but surprisingly fluid singer, whispering melodies in multitracked reverb to contrast his sharper falsetto raps."

Pitchfork included it on the "Overlooked Records 2008" list.

== Track listing ==
No.	Title	Length
1.	"Exiting Arm"	3:50
2.	"Day Dangerous"	5:20
3.	"The No"	3:19
4.	"Sick Soft Perfection"	3:09
5.	"Hollow Hollered"	6:04
6.	"The Crow"	4:02
7.	"Unlikely Rock Shock"	3:11
8.	"Take to Take"	2:55
9.	"Gonebones"	3:33
10.	"Wanted Found"	5:56
11.	"Providence"	4:50

== Personnel ==
Credits adapted from liner notes.

Subtle

- Dax Pierson – vocals, Ableton Live (synthesizer, programming)
- Alexander Kort – electric cello, acoustic cello, electric bass, acoustic bass
- Jordan Dalrymple – drums, guitar, synthesizer, vocals, programming
- Jeffrey "Jel" Logan – drum machine, drum programming
- Marty Kalani Dowers – woodwinds, synthesizer
- Adam "Doseone" Drucker – words, vocals, synthesizer, programming, artwork

Technical personnel

- Subtle – recording
- Jay Pellicci – mixing
- Mike Wells – mastering
