= Jordan Dalrymple =

- Also known as: Antonionian
- Origin: California
- Genres: Indie rock
- Occupation(s): Multi-instrumentalist, singer, producer
- Years active: 2002–present
- Labels: Anticon
- Website: www.antonionian.bandcamp.com

Antonionian (born Jordan Dalrymple) is a multi-instrumentalist based in California.

== History ==
Jordan Dalrymple has been a member of Subtle and 13 & God.

He released the debut album, Antonionian, under the alias Antonionian on Anticon in 2011.

== Discography ==
=== Redacted Choir ===
- Redacted Choir (2021)

=== Antonionian ===
- Antonionian (2011)
- The War EP (2012)
- Versions EP (2013)
- Extremes EP (2014)
- Arrhythmia (2019)

=== Subtle ===
- A New White (2004)
- For Hero: For Fool (2006)
- ExitingARM (2008)

=== 13 and God ===
- Own Your Ghost (2011)

=== Contributions ===
- Clouddead – "Mulholland Instrumental" from "Dead Dogs Two" (2004)
- Doseone – "The Tale of the Private Mind" from Ha (2005)
- Themselves – "Daxstrong" from CrownsDown (2009)
