= Wolves and Wishes =

Studio album by Dosh
- Released: May 13, 2008
- Genres: Post-rock, instrumental hip-hop
- Length: 44:06
- Label: Anticon
- Producers: Ben Durrant, Dosh

Dosh chronology
The Lost Take (2006)	Wolves and Wishes (2008)	Tommy (2010)

Professional ratings
Review scores
Source	Rating
AllMusic	4/5 stars
The A.V. Club	B+
Exclaim!	favorable
Paste	favorable
Pitchfork	7.7/10
PopMatters	7/10 stars
Urb	4.5/5 stars
XLR8R	8/10

Wolves and Wishes is the fourth solo studio album by American multi-instrumentalist Dosh. It was released on Anticon on May 13, 2008.

== Critical reception ==
Ben Peterson of AllMusic gave the album 4 stars out of 5, saying, "while Dosh's effervescent soundscape often veers unpredictably from ambient and dreamy to manic and scattershot in a single stroke, it somehow remains unified, transfixing, and above all, highly listenable." Roque Strew of Pitchfork gave the album a 7.7 out of 10, saying: "Bristling with jazzy forms, infused with a global soul, Wolves and Wishes turns hip-hop's philosophy of bricolage into a glitchy, raucous, genre-spanning achievement." Sara Miller of Paste said, "Wolves and Wishes presents upbeat, unique compositions that allow the listener's mind ample time to wander freely." She called it "Dosh's most fully realized and cohesive work to date."

== Track listing ==
All tracks are written by Martin Dosh, except where noted.

No.	Title	Length
1.	"Don't Wait for the Needle to Drop"	3:31
2.	"Bury the Ghost" (Dosh, Mike Lewis)	3:58
3.	"If You Want to, You Have To"	4:43
4.	"First Impossible"	8:59
5.	"Kit and Pearle"	4:00
6.	"Wolves"	3:59
7.	"Food Cycles" (Dosh, Lewis, Andrew Broder, Jeremy Ylvisaker)	3:07
8.	"Keep Up Appearance"	3:10
9.	"The Magic Stick"	3:21
10.	"Capture the Flag"	5:18

== Personnel ==
Credits adapted from liner notes.

- Martin Dosh – drums, Rhodes piano, piano, lots of other things
- Mike Lewis – clarinet, saxophone, keyboards (2, 3), bass guitar (3)
- Jeremy Ylvisaker – guitar (3, 4, 6, 7, 8), pedal steel guitar (5)
- Andrew Bird – violin (1, 3, 5, 7), vocals (3, 5)
- Andrew Broder – guitar (1, 2, 7, 9)
- Mark Erickson – bass guitar (1, 5)
- Bonnie 'Prince' Billy – vocals (2)
- Marshall Lacount – banjo (4), vocals (5)
- Ben Durrant – guitar (5)
- Nona Marie Invie – vocals (5)
- Robert Skoro – vocals (5)
- Ellen Fitzgerald – vocals (5)
- Odd Nosdam – noise (8)
- David King – drums (9)
- Bryan Olson – guitar (9, 10)
