= Sydney Rogerson =

Sydney George Rogerson
- Born: 14 May 1915
- Died: 23 September 1993 (aged 78)
- Military career
- Allegiance: United Kingdom
- Branch: British Army
- Rank: Staff sergeant
- Conflicts: World War II
- Awards: George Cross (GC)

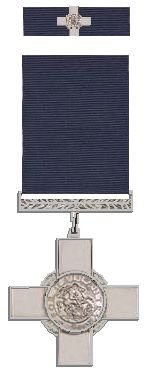
George Cross and its ribbon bar

Staff Sergeant Sydney George Rogerson, GC, (14 May 1915 – 23 September 1993), was a British Army soldier. He was awarded the George Cross for his heroics on 2 January 1946, after an explosion at Savernake Forest in Wiltshire.

== Biography ==
Sydney George Rogerson was born 14 May 1915. He was a British Army soldier who achieved the rank of staff sergeant. Rogerson was awarded the George Cross for the "most conspicuous gallantry" he showed on 2 January 1946 when a massive explosion wrecked 27 railway wagons and two lorries being loaded with munitions at Savernake Forest in Wiltshire. He showed "great courage and calmness" in taking control of the situation and rescued two severely injured men from beneath a burning lorry carrying a full load of shells. He died 23 September 1993.

== Legacy ==
The Royal Army Ordnance Corps Museum at the Princess Royal Barracks in Deepcut purchased Rogerson's medal where it is now on display. It was the only such medal awarded to a non-commissioned officer in the Corps.

== See also ==
- Kenneth Biggs
