= Philip Davies (architectural historian) =

Philip Davies OBE
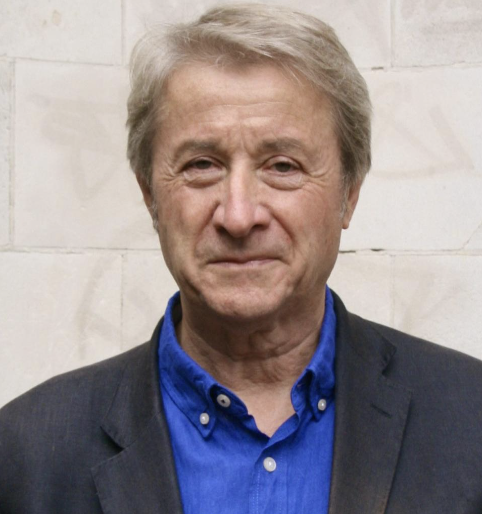
- Born: Philip Davies; 28 August 1950 (age 76); London, United Kingdom
- Occupation: Architectural Historian

Academic background
- Education: University of Cambridge

Academic work
- Discipline: Historian and Town Planner
- Sub-discipline: Architecture, Commonwealth Historian, Conservation, Planning
- Institutions: English Heritage; Commonwealth Heritage Forum
- Website: https://www.commonwealthheritage.org/

Philip Hugh Davies OBE FSA FRHistS FRAS (born 28 August 1950) is an international heritage and planning consultant and the former planning and development director for English Heritage. He has written a number of books on the architectural and topographical history of India, London and the British Commonwealth and Empire.

== Early life ==
Philip Davies was born in August 1950. He was educated at Tollington Grammar School (1961–68) in Muswell Hill and then at Queens' College, University of Cambridge, where he obtained an MA in History before taking a postgraduate degree in town planning.

== Career ==
Davies was director of the London region of English Heritage from 1997 to 2005 and then planning and development director from 2005 to 2011. He originated and set up English Heritage's buildings at risk programme in London. He now works as an international heritage and planning consultant. In 2011 he was briefly interim chief executive for the Fulham Palace Trust. He has written a number of books on the architectural and topographical history of India, Burma and London.

He is a fellow of the Society of Antiquaries of London, a fellow of the Royal Historical Society and a fellow of the Royal Asiatic Society, and a trustee of numerous UK and overseas conservation organisations.

Davies founded the Commonwealth Heritage Forum in 2018 where he is the former Chairman and currently consultant Chief Executive. In 2022, he established the Queen Elizabeth II Platinum Jubilee Commonwealth Heritage Skills Training Programme. With funding of £12.26 million, it is the largest ever heritage programme in the history of the Commonwealth supporting heritage projects and training for people from deprived backgrounds in over twenty-five countries.

Davies was appointed Officer of the Order of the British Empire (OBE) in the Diplomatic section of the 2024 New Year Honours for services to UK and Commonwealth heritage.

== Selected publications ==
- Splendours of the Raj: British Architecture in India 1660-1947. John Murray, 1985. ISBN 0719541158
- Troughs and Drinking Fountains. Chatto & Windus, London, 1989. (Chatto curiosities) ISBN 0701133694
- Penguin Guide to the Monuments of India: Vol.II Islamic, Rajput, European. Penguin, 1989. ISBN 0670808474
- Lost London 1870–1945. Transatlantic Press, 2009.
- Panoramas of Lost London. Transatlantic Press, 2011. ISBN 978-1907176722
- Images of Lost London 1875–1945. Atlantic Publishing, Croxley Green, 2012. ISBN 9781909242043
- London Hidden Interiors. Atlantic Publishing, 2012. ISBN 978-0956864246
- Lost England 1870-1930. Atlantic Publishing, 2016. ISBN 978-1909242791
- Lost Warriors - Seagrim and Pagani of Burma - The Last Great Untold Story of WWII. Atlantic Publishing, 2017. ISBN 978-1909242852
- London: The Great Transformation 1860-1920 ISBN 978-1-015143-00-6
