= Antonionian (album) =

Studio album by Antonionian
- Released: March 29, 2011
- Genre: Avant-pop
- Length: 30:27
- Label: Anticon
- Producer: Jordan Dalrymple

Antonionian chronology
| Antonionian (2011) | The War EP (2012) |

Professional ratings
Review scores
| Source | Rating |
|---|---|
| Gutter Magazine | favorable |
| Pitchfork | 6.8/10 |
| Spectrum Culture | 4.0/5 |

Antonionian is the debut studio album by American multi-instrumentalist Jordan Dalrymple under the Antonionian moniker. It was released on Anticon in 2011. Music videos were created for "Into the Night" and "The Ride".

== Critical reception ==
Nick Neyland of Pitchfork gave the album a 6.8 out of 10, saying: "This is an album that's all about feeling, of conjuring up a particular mood, where the words are an additional splash of color for the listener to decipher." Glenn Jackson of XLR8R called it "electro-funk-leaning avant-pop".

Nick Hanover of Spectrum Culture gave the album a 4.0 out of 5, saying: "Over the course of nine tracks, Antonionian's debut plays out like an Anticon sampler, with references to almost every path the label has explored in the past decade or so." He added: "With Antonionian, Dalrymple may not have exactly come out of Doseone or Yoni Wolf's shadows but he's easily proven himself to be a force to be reckoned with in his own right." Daniel Levin Becker of SF Weekly said, "the album boasts the closest thing to honest-to-goodness songs we've heard from the Anticon camp in a long time."

== Track listing ==
| No. | Title | Length |
|---|---|---|
| 1. | "The Desert" | 2:55 |
| 2. | "Another Mistral" | 3:40 |
| 3. | "My Mind's I" | 3:05 |
| 4. | "Vanquished" | 3:39 |
| 5. | "The Ride" | 2:58 |
| 6. | "Into the Night" | 4:21 |
| 7. | "Fate's Not Particular" | 2:55 |
| 8. | "The Desert Pt. II" | 3:46 |
| 9. | "Pull True" | 3:14 |

== Personnel ==
Credits adapted from liner notes.

- Jordan Dalrymple – production
- Carrie Clough – vocals (3)
- Hervé Salters – piano (6)
- Mike Cresswell – mixing, mastering
- Adam Drucker – artwork
