= Jennifer Bate =

British concert organist (1944–2020)

Jennifer Bate OBE
- Born: Jennifer Lucy Bate; 11 November 1944; London, England
- Died: 25 March 2020 (aged 75)
- Occupation: Concert organist
- Known for: Recordings of Olivier Messiaen's organ music
- Awards: Ordre des Arts et des Lettres; Légion d’Honneur

Jennifer Lucy Bate, OBE (11 November 1944 – 25 March 2020) was a British concert organist best known for recording the complete organ works by Olivier Messiaen, César Franck, Felix Mendelssohn and Peter Dickinson.

== Early life and education ==
Born in London, Bate was the only child of Horace Alfred Bate, organist of St James' Church, Muswell Hill, from 1924 to 1978, and Dorothy Hunt. Her mother was also the daughter of an organist, and sister to one.

Bate was educated at the Tollington School in Muswell Hill, then the University of Bristol. Having initially been taught by her father, she became an Associate of the Royal College of Music in 1961 and a Licentiate of the Royal Academy of Music in 1963. After graduating from university in 1966 she worked for a few years as a librarian at the London School of Economics.

== Career ==
Bate was considered an authority on the organ music of Olivier Messiaen, whom she met in 1975 when he and his wife attended one of Bate's concerts at her father's church in Muswell Hill. In 1986 she gave the first British performance of his Livre du Saint-Sacrement at Westminster Cathedral and later made the world premiere recording of the work under the personal supervision of the composer, winning the Grand Prix du Disque. She recorded the works at the Eglise de la Sainte-Trinite in Paris and at Beauvais Cathedral. Messiaen also endorsed Bate's earlier recordings of all of his other organ works. She owned scores that contain many personal markings and references made by him.

Bate had a broad repertoire spanning several centuries. She recorded the complete organ works of César Franck and of Felix Mendelssohn, the reviews of the latter mentioning the "easy fluency of her technique" and "her highly articulate and intelligent interpretations". She also recorded English organ music, including works by John Stanley and Samuel Wesley, and the complete organ works of Peter Dickinson, whose organ concerto she premiered and first recorded. She appeared at the BBC Proms four times between 1974 and 2008.

== Personal life and death ==
Bate was married briefly, from 1968 to 1972, to the organist and composer George (later Sir George) Thalben-Ball (1896−1987), who was 48 years her senior. The marriage was later annulled.

She died of cancer on 25 March 2020, aged 75.

== Honours ==
Bate received an honorary doctorate from the University of Bristol in 2007. She was appointed an Officer of the Order of the British Empire (OBE) in the 2008 Birthday Honours, and became an officer of the Ordre des Arts et des Lettres and a chevalier of the Légion d’Honneur in 2012.

She was granted honorary Italian citizenship in 1996.
