= Dosh (musician) =

American musician (born 1972)

- Born: Martin Chavez Dosh; September 6, 1972 (age 54)
- Origin: Minneapolis, Minnesota, United States
- Genres: Electronic, ambient, instrumental hip-hop, downtempo, IDM, indietronica, folktronica
- Occupations: Multi-instrumentalist, producer
- Instruments: Drums, piano, xylophone, keyboard, sampler
- Years active: 2003–present
- Labels: Dinkytown, Anticon, Graveface

Martin Chavez Dosh (born September 6, 1972), better known mononymously as Dosh, is a multi-instrumentalist based in Minneapolis, Minnesota.

== Style ==
Dosh is principally a percussionist who usually adds a Rhodes piano to his kit and uses other electronic devices such as samplers and looping pedals. He has been characterized as experimental/electronica due to his use of signal-altering devices in performance to allow him to create live solo performances using keyboards, tuned percussion, and drums. Dosh often collaborates with other musicians in recordings and live performances, both as leader and in support.

Dosh is also known for the incorporation of his family life into his work. Naoise EP is named after his son. "Happy Song for Tadgh" from the EP is a reference to Naoise's half-brother, Tadgh. He wrote the song "I Think I'm Getting Married" for his future wife at the time.

== History ==
Martin Dosh grew up in the Twin Cities. His musical training began with childhood piano lessons. He did not take up drums until his mid-teens. By the time he left home for Bard College at Simon's Rock at age 16, he had decided music would likely be his profession; however, he subsequently got a degree in creative writing.

Throughout the 1990s, Dosh played with a number of bands on the East Coast. When he moved back to Minneapolis in 1997, he started his own band, as he had begun to compose his own music. He also worked at his alma mater, Lake Country School, teaching percussion, driving the school bus, and assisting classroom teachers. Immersing himself in the local scene, Dosh played with many bands over the next five years: Nasty Goat, Best Red, Animals Expert At Hankering, Iffy, Vicious Vicious and T. All this time, he recorded tape after tape of original music on a 4-track machine.

Dosh's work with Andrew Broder in Lateduster and Fog gave him an experience that helped him begin to perform solo. In 2002, Dosh released his first album, Dosh. He had recorded it himself, mostly in his basement. The album developed a following in the local Twin Cities scene. After he had played many shows, City Pages voted him second on their annual "picked to click" list. Dosh was re-released internationally on Anticon in 2003. It was reviewed in Village Voice, URB, Flaunt, XLR8R, The Big Takeover and a number of online magazines.

Dosh has toured extensively with Andrew Bird. He contributed significantly to Andrew Bird's albums Armchair Apocrypha and Noble Beast.

Dosh is a member of The Cloak Ox, a four-piece band featuring Andrew Broder, Jeremy Ylvisaker and Mark Erickson.

== Discography ==
=== Albums ===
- Dosh (Dinkytown, 2002; Anticon, 2003)
- Pure Trash (Anticon, 2004)
- The Lost Take (Anticon, 2006)
- Wolves and Wishes (Anticon, 2008)
- Tommy (Anticon, 2010)
- Milk Money (Graveface, 2013)
- Tomorrow 1972 (Max / Min Music, 2021)

=== EPs ===
- Naoise EP (Anticon, 2004)

=== Live albums ===
- Live on KVSC 3-3-03 (2003)
- Live in the USA 2003 (2004)
- Live on KALX 11-18-04 (2005)
- Triple Rock (2007)

=== Limited edition albums ===
- Numerous Quality Mixes (2003)
- Powder Horn (2005)
- Silver Face (2011)

=== Dosh & Ghostband ===
- Def Kith (Anticon, 2014)
- Def Kith II: The Price Is Ill (Anticon, 2016)

=== Lateduster ===
- Lateduster (Firetrunk, 2002)
- Five Easy Pieces (Firetrunk, 2002)
- Easy Pieces (Merck, 2004)

=== The Cloak Ox ===
- Prisen (Totally Gross National Product, 2011)
- Shoot The Dog (Totally Gross National Product, 2013)

=== Contributions ===
- Fog - "WallpaperSinkorSwim" from Ether Teeth (2003)
- Odd Nosdam - "Refreshing Beverage" from Burner (2005)
- Jel - "No Solution" from Soft Money (2006)
- Andrew Bird - Armchair Apocrypha (2007)
- Subtle - "Deathful" from Yell&Ice (2007)
- Dark Dark Dark - "Ashes" "A Cloud Story" "Colors" "Junk Bones" from The Snow Magic (2008)
- Andrew Bird - Noble Beast (2009)

=== Remixes ===
- Sole and the Skyrider Band - "The Sound of Head on Concrete" from Sole and the Skyrider Band Remix LP (2009)
- Dark Dark Dark - "All the Things" from Remixes (2009)
- Bon Iver - "Holocene" from Bon Iver, Bon Iver: Stems Project (2012)

=== Compilation appearances ===
- "Steve the Cat" on Anticon Label Sampler: 1999-2004 (2004)
