= Happy Apple =

American jazz band

- Origin: Minneapolis, Minnesota
- Genres: Jazz
- Years active: 1996–present
- Labels: Sunnyside
- Members: Erik Fratzke; Michael Lewis; David King
- Past members: Anton Denner; Cully Swansen
- Website: www.happyapplemusic.com

Part of the Solutionproblem
Review scores
Source	Rating
AllMusic	3/5 stars

Body Popping Moon Walking Top Rocking
Review scores
Source	Rating
AllMusic	4/5 stars

Please Refrain from Fronting
Review scores
Source	Rating
AllMusic	4/5 stars

Youth Oriented
Review scores
Source	Rating
AllMusic	4/5 stars

The Peace Between Our Companies
Review scores
Source	Rating
AllMusic	4/5 stars

Happy Apple is an American jazz trio from Minneapolis, Minnesota.

Initially formed in 1996 by David King (drums), Michael Lewis (saxophone), Anton Denner (saxophone) and Cully Swansen (bass), since 1998 the lineup has consisted of King, Lewis, and bass guitarist Erik Fratzke.

All three members compose music for the group, which places equal emphasis on improvisation. Happy Apple plays a brand of jazz music drawing on several other genres; the group's members play in other bands ranging from indie rock and heavy metal to free jazz and electronic. The best known of these is The Bad Plus, in which King also plays drums.

The name Happy Apple comes from a Fisher-Price toy from the 1970s which King often uses as an auxiliary percussion instrument.

== Critical reception ==
Reviewing the group's 2003 album Youth Oriented, CMJ New Music Report said that "Happy Apple has an edgy appeal, fueled by its elastic sense of rhythm and dynamics. The band can groove hard for extended stetches, playing with the singlemindedness of a rock group, or it can sit in one place, working on a freetime idea just as comfortably."

== Discography ==
=== Albums ===
- Blown Shockwaves & Crash Flow (Self-released, 1997)
- Part of the Solutionproblem (No Alternative, 1998)
- Body Popping Moon Walking Top Rocking (No Alternative, 1999)
- Jazzercise with the Elders/E Equals What I Says It Does/God Bless Certain Portions of the USA (Self-released, 2000)
- Please Refrain from Fronting (Self-released, 2001)
- Youth Oriented (Sunnyside, 2003)
- The Peace Between Our Companies (Sunnyside, 2004 Europe, 2005 North America)
- Happy Apple Back on Top (Sunnyside, 2007)
- New York CD (Self-released, 2020 (digital); Sunnyside, 2024 (CD))
