= Fog (band) =

American hip-hop group

- Origin: Minneapolis, Minnesota, United States
- Genres: Indie rock, experimental rock, folk
- Instruments: Guitar, piano, turntable
- Years active: 1999-2008, 2014-present
- Labels: Lex Records, Ninja Tune
- Members: Andrew Broder
- Past members: Mark Erickson; Tim Glenn; Martin Dosh; Jeremy Ylvisaker; Michael Lewis

Fog is an American indie rock band from Minneapolis, Minnesota, formed in 1999. The band is fronted by Andrew Broder, and for a time included Mark Erickson and Tim Glenn. After ending the project in 2008, Broder announced its return as a solo project in 2014.

Most of Fog's releases have been put out by Lex Records or Ninja Tune.

== Style ==
For most of their existence, material released by Fog had been produced largely by Andrew Broder alone, combining both traditionally performed instruments and turntable-derived samples, until the switch to a traditional three-piece rock band format was announced in 2006.

== History ==
In 1999, Fog started in Minneapolis, Minnesota. Andrew Broder started writing music at first as a type of therapy to help with his depression. His first album Fog features MF Doom and Doseone on vocals. The "debut" album by Fog as the full band, Ditherer, was released in 2007. Phil Elverum, Andrew Bird, Low, Dosh and Yoni Wolf appear on the album.

In 2008, Fog had stopped their activity in order to involve in other various projects, and hasn't reunited since. In July 2010, Andrew Broder announced through their MySpace page that the band "...as it has existed is finished." Later that year, his new band The Cloak Ox was formed.

On 16 June 2014, Broder cooperated with Kickstarter with a new Fog album in mind. The kickstarter has to reach a minimum of $17,000 before 7 August 2014. Within 7 hours Fog received $2,340. The Kickstarter page states, "It's time for Fog to make its return. Andrew has begun crafting a new set of songs under the Fog moniker, with the goal releasing a finished album no later than fall of 2015".

== Other projects ==
Andrew Broder was one half of the indie rock duo Hymie's Basement along with Yoni Wolf of Why?. He was also a part of Lateduster with friends JG Everest, Bryan Olson and Dosh. Broder, Dosh, Erickson and Jeremy Ylvisaker are now playing as The Cloak Ox. In 2010, Andrew Broder wrote the score for Alan Moore's Unearthing as Crook&Flail with Doseone.

Andrew Broder has remixed songs by Dosh, Themselves, Minus the Bear and Sole. He also appears on Dntel's Dumb Luck. He released two bootleg albums of popular rap songs set to new instrumental tracks on his own Dinkytown record label in 2002 and 2003. In 2009, he recorded and released 10 instrumental albums on the experimental music label Static Station.

== Discography ==
=== Studio albums ===
- Fog (Dinkytown, 2000; Ninja Tune, 2002)
- Ether Teeth (Ninja Tune, 2003)
- 10th Avenue Freakout (Lex Records, 2005)
- Ditherer (Lex Records, 2007)
- For Good (Totally Gross National Product, 2016)

=== EPs ===
- Hummer (Ninja Tune, 2004)
- Loss Leader (Lex Records, 2006)

=== Singles ===
- Check Fraud (Ninja Tune, 2002)
- Pneumonia (Ninja Tune, 2002)
- What A Day Day (Ninja Tune, 2003)
- The Very Busy Salesman (Alien Transistor, 2005)
- I Have Been Wronged (Lex Records, 2007)

=== Contributions ===
- "Happy Song For Tadhg" by Dosh on Naoise (2004)
- "Small Mr. Man Pants" by Odd Nosdam on Burner (2005)
- "No Solution" by Jel on Soft Money (2006)
- "The Nogoodnick" by Antimc on It's Free, But It's Not Cheap (2006)
- "A Whistle And A Prayer" by Coldcut on Sound Mirrors (2006)
- "Deathful" by Subtle on Yell&Ice (2007)
- "Natural Resources" by Dntel on Dumb Luck (2007)
- "Don't Wait For The Needle To Drop" "Bury The Ghost" "Food Cycles" "The Magic Stick" by Dosh on Wolves and Wishes (2008)
- "Puzzled" "Crosssection Of Wreckage" by Themselves on The Free Houdini (2009)

=== Remixes ===
- "Dark Sky Demo" by Themselves on The No Music of AIFFS (2003)
- "Rock It To The Next Episode" by Dosh on Naoise (2004)
- "Stupid Things Implode On Themselves" by Sole and the Skyrider Band on Sole and the Skyrider Band Remix LP (2009)
