= Jeremy Ylvisaker =

American musician

- Origin: Minneapolis, Minnesota, United States
- Genres: Indie rock
- Occupation: Multi-instrumentalist
- Years active: 2002–present
- Labels: Totally Gross National Product
- Member of: Alpha Consumer; The Cloak Ox
- Website: The Cloak Ox

Jeremy Ylvisaker is a multi-instrumentalist from Minneapolis, Minnesota. He is a member of the indie rock bands Alpha Consumer and The Cloak Ox.

== Career ==
He is a member of Alpha Consumer along with Michael Lewis and JT Bates. The band has released three albums, including Kick Drugs Out of America (2011).

He is also a member of The Cloak Ox along with Andrew Broder of Fog, Mark Erickson and Dosh. In 2011, the band released the debut EP Prisen. In the same year, It was announced that The Cloak Ox is a winner of the City Pages "Picked to Click" poll.

In the mid 2000s, he played guitar in Andrew Bird's touring band alongside Martin Dosh on drums and Michael Lewis on bass.

== Discography ==
=== Jeremy Ylvisaker ===
- Welcome to Christmastown (2008)
- Malibu Hymnal (2017)
- Dimebag (2017)

=== Alpha Consumer ===
- Alpha Consumer (2006)
- Gary Victorsen’s (2008)
- Kick Drugs Out of America (2011)
- Meat (2014)

=== The Cloak Ox ===
- Prisen (2011)
- Shoot The Dog (2013)

=== The Suburbs ===
- Hey Muse (2017)

=== Contributions ===
- Dosh - Dosh (2002)
- Mark Mallman - The Red Bedroom (2002)
- Dosh - The Lost Take (2006)
- Mark Mallman - Between the Devil and Middle C (2006)
- Fog - Ditherer (2007)
- Dosh - Wolves and Wishes (2008)
- Luke Redfield - Fire Mountain (2008)
- Andrew Bird - Noble Beast (2009)
- Eyedea and Abilities - By the Throat (2009)
- Haley Bonar - Golder (2011)
- Luke Redfield - Ephemeral Eon (2010)
- Andrew Bird - Break It Yourself (2012)
- Andrew Bird - Hands of Glory
- Luke Redfield - Tusen Takk (2012)
- Mark Mallman - Double Silhouette (2012)
- Haley Bonar - Last War (2014)
