= Livre du Saint-Sacrement =

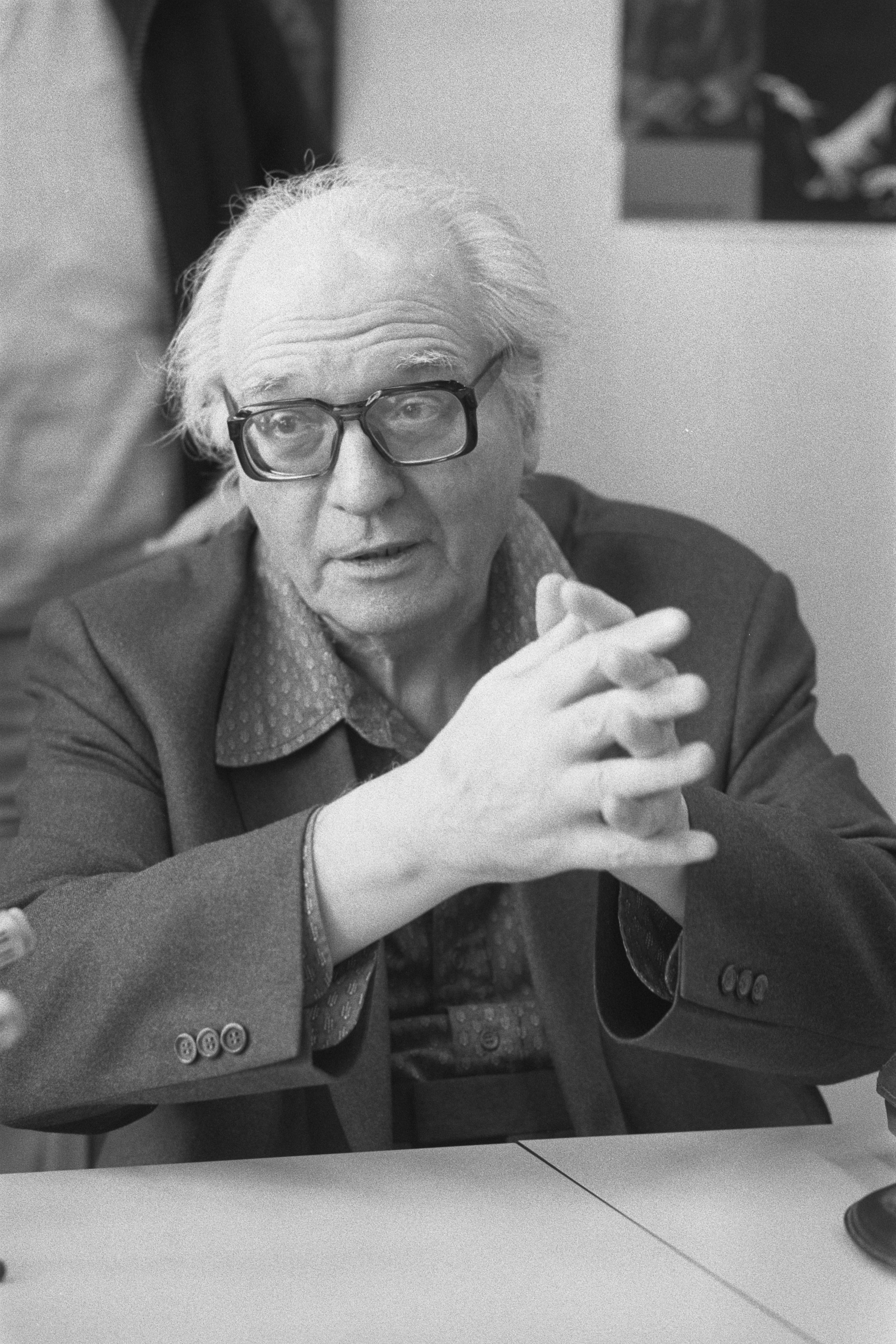
Olivier Messiaen in 1986

Livre du Saint Sacrement ("Book of the Holy Sacrament") is a collection of pieces for organ on the subject of the Eucharist by the French composer Olivier Messiaen. It was composed mainly in 1984, completed in 1985, and first performed in 1986.

== Genesis and composition ==
Livre du Saint Sacrement was commissioned by the American Guild of Organists for its 1986 National Convention in Detroit, Michigan. Ray Ferguson, the convention program chair, was largely responsible for acquiring the commission in 1982-1984, with help from the eventual premiere organist, Almut Rössler. Messiaen had been the organist at the Église de la Sainte-Trinité, Paris since 1931; by his own account, the Livre brought to summation his years of experience in improvising organ music for the liturgy.

== Structure ==
The work contains 18 movements in three major sections. In the score, each movement is headed by one or more quotations from biblical and theological sources.

Part 1: "Acts of adoration"
1. Adoro te
"I adore Thee, O hidden Deity!" (Thomas Aquinas, Adore te)
2. La source de Vie (The Source of Life)
"May my heart always thirst for you, O fountain of life, source of eternal light!" (Prayer attributed to St. Bonaventure)
3. Le Dieu caché (The hidden God)
"My eyes could not bear the splendor of your glory. It is to spare my weakness that you hide yourself beneath the veils of the Sacrament." (Thomas à Kempis, De Imitatione Christi)
"On the cross only divinity was hidden; here, humanity is hidden as well. Nevertheless, professing and believing in both, I make the same prayer as the penitent thief." (Thomas Aquinas, Adore te)
4. Acte de foi (Act of Faith)
"My God, I firmly believe. . . ." (Prayer, Acte de foi)
Part 2: "The mysteries of Christ"
5. Puer natus est nobis
"A child is born to us, a son is given to us." (Isaiah 9:5)
6. La manne et le Pain de Vie (The Manna and the Bread of Life)
"You nourished your people with the food of angels. You unfailingly gave them ready-made bread from heaven, capable of granting every pleasure and satisfying every taste. And the substance that you gave manifested your tender love for your children, since it accommodated the tastes of everyone who ate it and transformed according to the needs of each." (Wisdom 16:20-21)
"The life that Christ give us through Communion is His whole life, with the special graces that He has earned for us by living every one of His mysteries for us." (Dom Columba Marmion, Christ in His Mysteries)
"I am the living bread that came down from heaven. Whoever eats this bread will live forever. And the bread that I give is my flesh, for the life of the world." (John 6:51)
7. Les ressuscités et la lumière de Vie (The Resurrected and the Light of Life)
"Whoever follows me does not walk in darkness, but will have the light of the life." (John 8:12)
"Whoever eats my flesh and drinks my blood has eternal life, and I will raise him up on the last day." (John 6:54)
8. Institution de l'Eucharistie (The Institution of the Eucharist)
"This is my body. This is my blood." (Matthew 26:26,28)
9. Les ténèbres (The Darkness)
"Jesus said to them: This is your hour, and the power of darkness." (Luke 22:53)
"When they reached the place called Golgotha, there they crucified him!" (Luke 23:33)
"From the sixth to the ninth hour, darkness spread over the whole land." (Matthew 27:45)
10. La Résurrection du Christ (The Resurrection of Christ)
"Why do you look for the living among the dead?" (Luke 24:5)
11. L'apparition du Christ ressuscité à Marie-Madeleine (The Appearance of the Risen Christ to Mary Magdalene)
"Mary Magdalene remained outside near the tomb, weeping. She turned and saw Jesus, but she did not recognize him. Jesus said to her: Mary! She cried: Rabbouni! (which means Master). Jesus said to her: Go and find my brothers, and report to them: I am going to my Father and your Father, to my God and your God." (John 20:11-17)
INTERMISSION
Part 3: "Prayers of today's Church"
12. La Transsubstantiation (The Transubstantiation)
"Sight, touch, taste in Thee are each deceived: hearing alone assures my belief. I believe all that the Son of God has spoken: nothing is truer than this word of Truth." (Thomas Aquinas, Adore te)
"Under diverse species, which are no longer substances but only signs, sublime realities are hidden." (Thomas Aquinas, Lauda Sion)
13. Les deux murailles d'eau (The Two Walls of Water)
"The waters were parted, and the children of Israel entered the sea on dry ground, with a wall of water to their right and to their left." (Exodus 14:21-22)
"If the Host is broken, do not falter, but remember that there is as much beneath each fragment as beneath the entire Host. The substance is not divided, only the sign undergoes fraction, through which neither the form nor the stature of the One beneath the sign is diminished." (Thomas Aquinas, Lauda Sion)
14. Prière avant la communion (Prayer before Communion)
"Lord, I am not worthy . . ., but only say the word. . . ." (Words of the Centurion, Matthew 8:8)
15. La joie de la grâce (The Joy of Grace)
"I come to you, Lord, to taste the joy of the sacred feast that you have prepared for the poor." (Thomas à Kempis, De Imitatione Christi)
"The lover runs and flies! He is full of joy, he is free and nothing holds him back." (Thomas à Kempis, De Imitatione Christi)
16. Prière après la communion (Prayer after Communion)
"My fragrance and my gentleness, my peace and my sweetness. . . ." (Prayer attributed to St. Bonaventure)
17. La Présence multipliée (The Presence Multiplied)
"One receives, a thousand receive; each one receives as much as these: all receive without consuming." (Thomas Aquinas, Lauda Sion)
18. Offrande et Alleluia final (Offering and Final Alleluia)
"I offer to you, Lord, all the outbursts of love and joy, the ecstasies, the raptures, the revelations, the heavenly visions of all saintly souls." (Thomas à Kempis, De Imitatione Christi)

Messiaen utilizes all the tools in his compositional kit, including his modes of limited transposition (modes à transpositions limitées); special chord forms (accords spéciaux), also called "color chords"; and non-retrogradable rhythm (rythme non-rétrogradable). Other elements of his musical language are employed in particular movements: Greek meters (movements 4, 7, 8, and 17); Hindu rhythms (5, 6, and 11); birdsongs (3, 5, 6, 8, 11, 12, 13, and 15); plainchant melodies (3, 5, 12, and 14); a serial row structure, (mode de valeurs, 12); and communicable language (langage communicable), a self-invented musical alphabet (7, 11, and 18).

== Premiere and Reception ==
Livre du Saint Sacrement was premiered at Metropolitan United Methodist Church in Detroit on 1 July 1986 to an audience of about 1,500, with the composer and his wife, Yvonne Loriod, seated in the balcony. Despite the extreme heat, the unfavorable acoustics, and mechanical problems with the organ, the reviews of Rössler's performance in the Detroit Free Press, The Diapason, and The American Organist were positive. The concert was repeated for the general public at Metropolitan Methodist on 3 July 1986, and Rössler performed the work for a third time at Hill Auditorium of the University of Michigan, Ann Arbor, on 9 July 1986. Over the following three years, the complete Livre du Saint Sacrement was presented 45 more times around the world by Rössler, Jennifer Bate, Thomas Daniel Schlee, Jon Gillock, Olivier Latry, and Erik Boström, as listed in the published score. Paul Jacobs became the first organist to win a Grammy Award in 2011 when his Naxos recording of Livre du Saint Sacrement was named Best Instrumental Soloist Performance (without orchestra). There are a lot of cd's and albums with Livre du Saint-Sacrement (Jennifer Bate, Marie-Bernadette Dufoucet, Jolanda Zwoferink).
