= Felix Aprahamian =

English music critic, writer and promoter

Aprahamian in his later years

Felix Aprahamian (Armenian: Ֆելիքս Աբրահամեան; 5 June 1914 – 15 January 2005), born Apraham Felix Bartev Aprahamian, was an English music critic, writer, concert organiser and publisher's adviser. He was secretary to the Organ Music Society, 1935–1970; concerts manager of the London Philharmonic Orchestra, 1940–1946; and deputy music critic of The Sunday Times, 1948–1989.

Aprahamian was particularly associated with modern French music including that of Olivier Messiaen and Francis Poulenc; among English composers he had great affinity with the music of Frederick Delius, becoming president of the Delius Society.

== Life and career ==
=== Early years ===
Aprahamian was born on 5 June 1914 in Hornsey, London, the son of Avedis Aprahamian né Hovhanessian, a carpet dealer, and his wife, Araxie, née Garabedian. The parents were both Armenian immigrants from Turkey. 1919, after the boy had recovered from diphtheria, the family moved to Muswell Hill, London, where Aprahamian lived for the rest of his life.

He was educated at Tollington School, Muswell Hill, where he developed a love of music, particularly organ music, so strong that it was detrimental to his schoolwork. He joked later "I failed Matriculation because I discovered music". He was good at French and became fluent in the language; when he was nine his father took him to Paris for the first time. After he left school, such further academic education as he had was at evening classes, particularly at the Working Men's College in Camden Town. His father found him a post as an office boy in the City of London, but he had little interest in business and continued to pursue his interest in organ music in his spare time. He studied with the organist Eric Thiman, and became a lifelong friend of another organist, William Lloyd Webber.

=== Early career ===
In 1931, at the age of seventeen, Aprahamian became assistant secretary to the Organ Music Society, and he developed into a proficient keyboard player. He began an extensive correspondence with musicians in Britain, France and elsewhere, which he preserved (along with diaries and notebooks) in a continually expanding archive in his family home. He was soon in correspondence with leading French musicians of the day such as André Marchal, Charles Tournemire, Maurice Durufle and the young Olivier Messiaen, and made arrangements for their visits to London. In 1933 he and two friends visited Frederick Delius at Grez-sur-Loing, and on the same trip he sat in an organ loft alongside Charles-Marie Widor, the doyen of French organists, incumbent at Saint-Sulpice, Paris, for 63 years.

In 1935 Aprahamian was made secretary of the Organ Music Society, and the same year his first article for The Musical Times – "Eugène Goossens in London" – was published. As secretary of the Organ Music Society, he successfully invited André Marchal, Charles Tournemire and Maurice Duruflé to perform in the society's concerts. He first corresponded with Olivier Messiaen in 1936 and in 1938 he organised the first complete performance in Britain of Messiaen's hour-long "meditations", La Nativité du Seigneur ("The Birth of Our Lord"), played by the composer on the organ of St Alban's, Holborn. They formed a friendship that lasted until the composer's death in 1992. Aprahamian's first meeting with Francis Poulenc was well before the start of the Second World War; asked to sign a photograph for Aprahamian's collection, Poulenc wrote, "Qui est ce monstre?" ("Who is this monster?"). The two men became good friends and would stay at each other's homes when making cross-Channel visits.

=== Second World War and post-war ===
During the war Aprahamian was concert director of the London Philharmonic Orchestra. His work with the orchestra led to an association with Sir Thomas Beecham, who was known as the leading champion of the music of Frederick Delius. Beecham responded to Aprahamian's knowledge of Delius and of the French repertoire and Aprahamian frequently acted on his behalf. Aprahamian's knowledge and love of French music led him to become in 1942 the organiser of the Concerts de Musique Française for the Free French in London. He worked with Tony Mayer, cultural attaché to the French Embassy, which gave him access to all the leading French performers and composers of the day. The concerts – more than a hundred in all – were mainly given at the Wigmore Hall in London. Among the artists whom he successfully invited to appear at these concerts were Benjamin Britten, Reginald Goodall, Peter Pears, Maggie Teyte and Michael Tippett; after the liberation of Paris in 1944 many French musicians also performed in the series, including – as well as Poulenc and Messiaen – Pierre Bernac, Henri Dutilleux, Pierre Fournier, Maurice Gendron, Yvonne Loriod, Ginette Neveu, Gérard Souzay and Jacques Thibaud.

In 1945 at Aprahamian's Muswell Hill house Messiaen and Loriod gave a private performance of Messiaen's suite for piano duet Visions de l'Amen in advance of the British premiere. As Beecham's informal assistant, Aprahamian employed a comprehensive knowledge of the French musical scene when the conductor was preparing to record Gounod's Faust in 1947. Beecham would not accept the British recording company's choice of soloists, and he sent Aprahamian to Paris to assemble an ideal French cast. With the aid of Roger Désormière Aprahamian succeeded, and he found time while in Paris to spend an hour with a surviving Gounod pupil, Henri Büsser, from whom, Aprahamian later recalled, "I gathered valuable information to pass on to Sir Thomas".

From 1946 to 1984 Aprahamian was employed by United Music Publishers – the principal agent for French music in Britain – as a consultant and, with Mayer, he played a central role in bringing French music to post-war British audiences. In 1948 he became deputy music critic of The Sunday Times and remained in that post for 41 years. When he joined the paper its long-standing chief music critic was Ernest Newman, of whose essays Aprahamian edited two volumes, published in 1956 and 1958. Newman was succeeded in 1958 by Desmond Shawe-Taylor. According to an obituarist, Lewis Foreman, Aprahamian and his The Sunday Times column were:

required reading, notable for his literate and humane commentary, and for his desire to cover the breadth of London music-making rather than always the plums, and for his championship of the British and French music of the early 20th century at a time of serial extremes.

Aprahamian's lack of sympathy for those "serial extremes" was celebrated by Bernard Levin in The Times:

Felix is not only a most delightful fellow, bearded like the pard and with a waistline that has often been mistaken for the QE2 sailing sideways, but a man who knows more about music than a hundred other experts in the subject ... he was asked a question, and – Felix being a most courteous person – he gave the answer. The question was: "Will the music of Peter Maxwell Davies and Harrison Birtwistle last?" And Felix, who would allow himself to be locked up for ever with Max Reger rather than tell a musical lie, answered: "Frankly, no."

Aprahamian wrote what Foreman describes as "erudite and well-judged record reviews", writing for The Gramophone from 1964 to 1975. Foreman adds that Aprahamian's "innumerable programme notes" set new standards for literacy and elegance.

Among British composers, his greatest passion was for Delius (he was an adviser to the Delius Trust from 1961, and later the president of the Delius Society). Organ music remained a lifelong enthusiasm; in 1982 an organ inherited from his friend André Marchal was brought from the Basque country and installed at Muswell Hill for the benefit of the organist David Liddle, a protégé of Aprahamian.

Aprahamian died on 15 January 2005 at the Whittington Hospital, Islington, London, of heart failure, aged 90. He never married and had no known descendants. He was commemorated by his friend and colleague John Amis:

He was remarkable especially for his generosity: he helped dozens of young musicians, gave them advice, made introductions for them, gave them books and scores, fed them and sometimes put them up at [Muswell Hill]. Nothing was too much trouble. The general impression was of somebody who was a mixture of characters from Proust and P. G. Wodehouse.

== Honours ==
In 1994 Aprahamian was made an honorary member of the Royal Philharmonic Society, the first music critic to receive that accolade. (Note: Earlier recipients included Hector Berlioz who had been a prominent music critic, but was nominated as a composer; Aprahamian was the first honorary member appointed for his music criticism. The second, and to date (2025) only other, critic so honoured has been Michael Kennedy.) In 1996 he became an officier of the French order of Arts and Letters, and was awarded an honorary doctorate by City University in 1995. In June 1994 an 80th birthday concert in his honour was given to a full house at the Wigmore Hall. The programme consisted largely of French music.

Nigel Simeone has written a series of books based on materials in Felix Aprahamian's archives which are listed in the Bibliography. Aprahamian never wrote his planned autobiography, but in 2023 Lewis Foreman and his wife Susan produced an annotated volume of his diaries and essays.

== Notes, references and sources ==
=== Sources ===
- Procter-Gregg, Humphrey, ed. (1976). Beecham Remembered. London: Duckworth. ISBN 0-7156-1117-8.
