= Haley McCallum =

American singer-songwriter

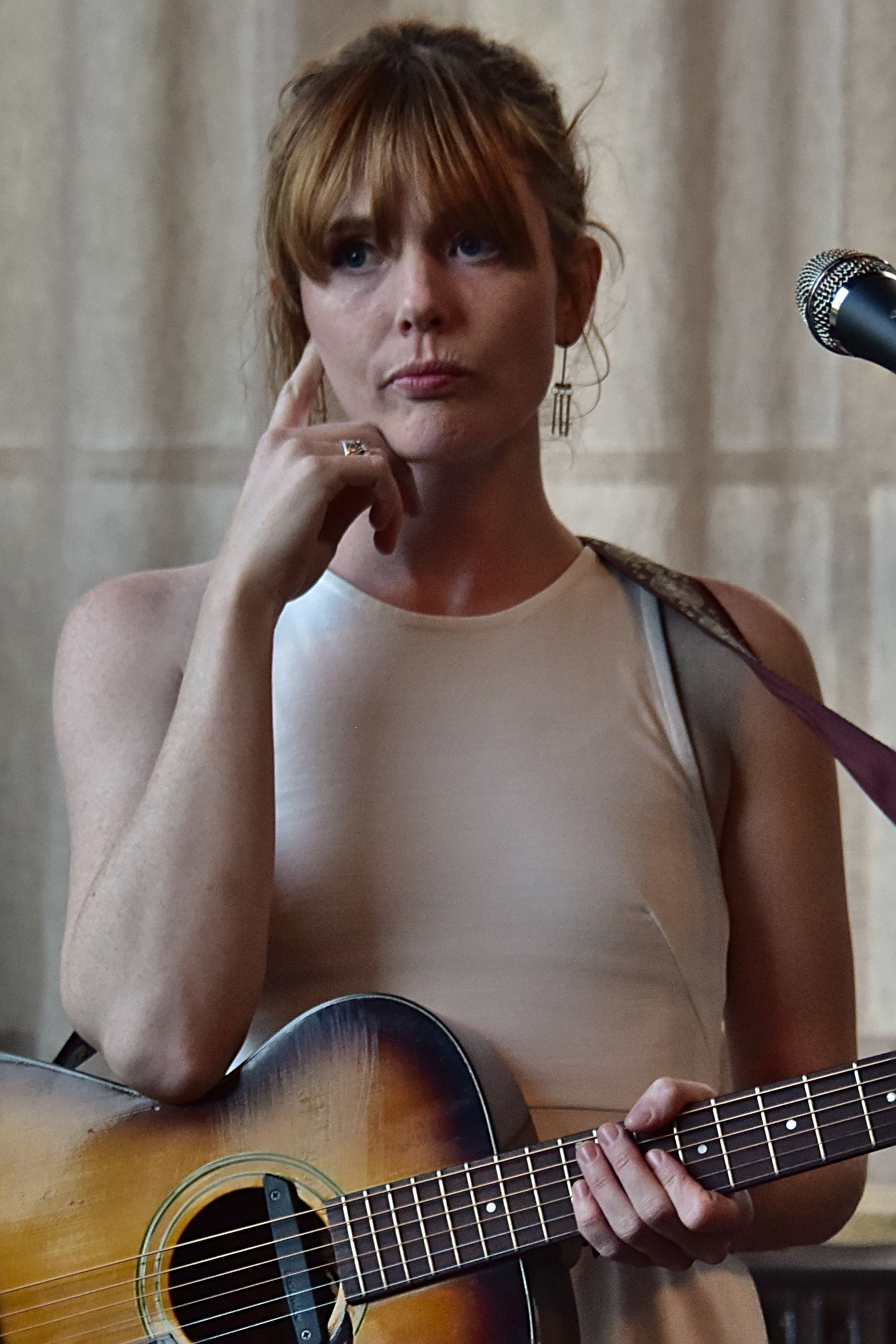
- Haley in Minneapolis in 2018

Background information
- Also known as: Haley, Haley Bonar
- Born: 22 April 1983 (age 43); Brandon, Manitoba, Canada
- Origin: Rapid City, South Dakota, United States
- Genres: Folk, slowcore, indie rock
- Label: Memphis Industries GNDWIRE
- Website: haleybonar.com

Haley McCallum (born 22 April 1983), professionally known as Haley and formerly Haley Bonar, is a Canadian-born American singer and songwriter who was raised in Rapid City, South Dakota. She has lived in Duluth and currently St. Paul, Minnesota. In 2009, she moved to Portland, Oregon, where she spent a year writing songs for her 2011 album Golder. She plays acoustic guitar, baritone electric guitar, electric guitar, and Rhodes or Wurlitzer electric piano, either solo or with her Twin Cities-based band, including Jeremy Ylvisaker, Robert Skoro, and Jacob Hanson.

== Life and work ==
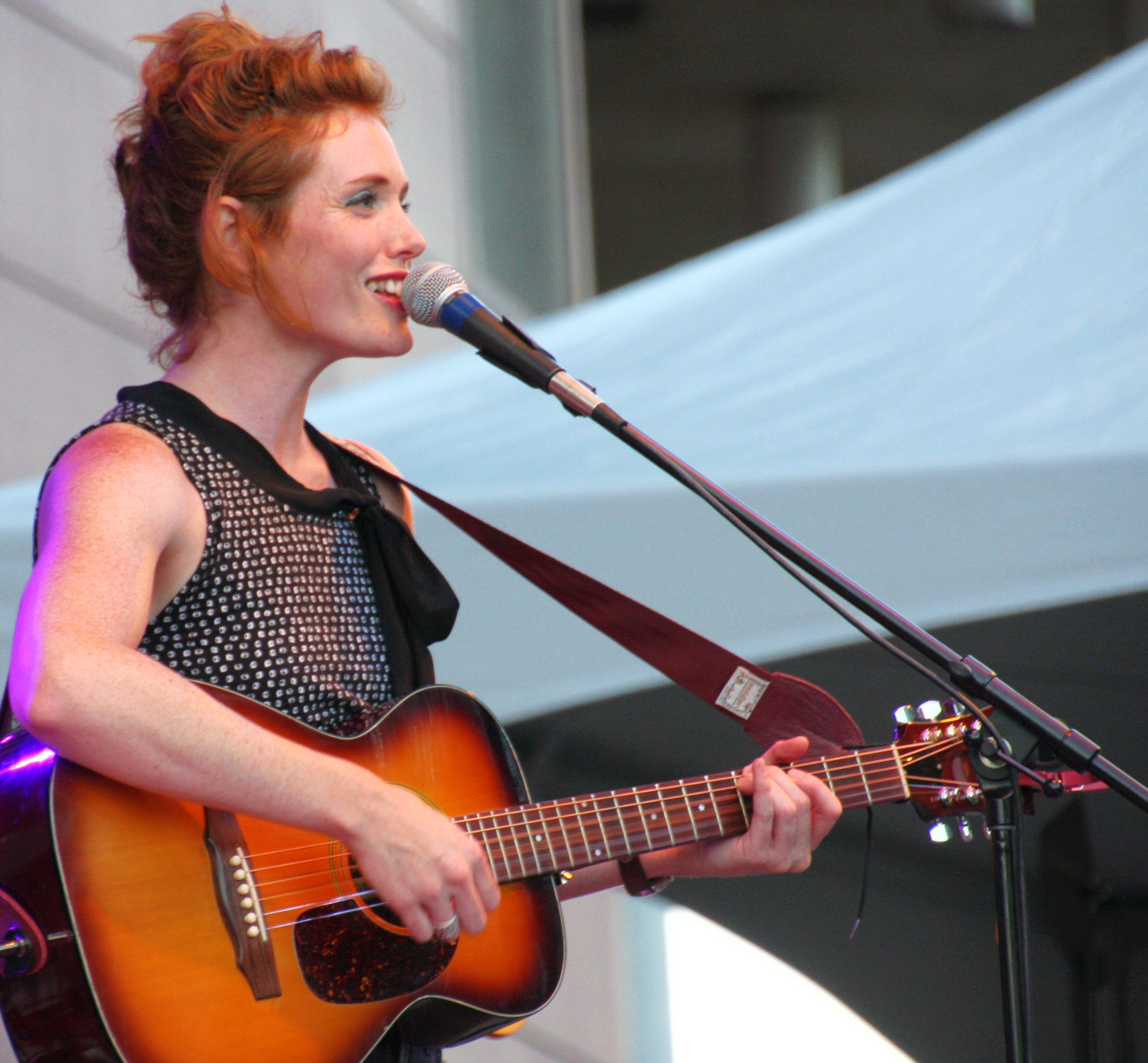
Haley in 2016

In 2003 Haley's album ...The Size of Planets (Chairkickers Union) received favorable reviews in the Twin Cities press. The album spawned the single "Am I Allowed," which was played on college radio stations. McCallum was 20 years old when the album was released, and did a number of tours with Duluth band Low upon its release. She also toured with Mason Jennings, Richard Buckner, Rivulets, and Mary Lou Lord, who was also Haley's manager for a time.

In 2006 she released the album Lure the Fox, originally on Mary Ellen Recordings, whose owner, Mary Lewis, decided to help her pay to record the album at Pachyderm Studio after reading a Star Tribune article about her in 2005. Dave King of Happy Apple and The Bad Plus plays drums, Chris Morrissey plays bass, and the album features Low's Alan Sparhawk on the track "Give it Up." Also on that track is David Frankenfeld, Haley's former drummer, who played on The Size of Planets. One year after Lure the Fox was recorded, Haley signed with local label Afternoon Records, which then released the album nationally in October 2006.

Lure the Fox earned Haley two Minnesota Music Awards, one for Best American Roots recording, and another for Best American Roots artist. The album also topped many Twin Cities year-end favorite lists, including those of the Star Tribune, City Pages, The Onion, and Pulse magazine. Haley was also featured on the cover of Metro magazine.

Big Star, released in June 2008 on Afternoon Records, gained Haley a broader audience with songs like "Big Star," "Green Eyed Boy," and "Arms of Harm," which was featured on the credits for an episode of Showtime's The United States of Tara.

Haley collaborated with Andrew Bird on his 2007 record Armchair Apocrypha, and appeared with him on tour. She sang on the feature song "Quiet Breathing" from the independent film Sweet Land, directed by fellow Minnesotan Ali Selim, and collaborated with Actual Wolf and Gary Louris.

In 2009, McCallum's move from St. Paul to Portland, Oregon was noted by City Pages. She returned to St. Paul in July 2010 and again became very active in the Twin Cities music scene. Upon completion of her album Golder, released in 2011, she also started a side project band called Gramma's Boyfriend, a "no-wave, new wave, punkish kind of thing that sounds like the Twin Peaks High School prom band." Jeremy Ylvisaker (Andrew Bird, Alpha Consumer, Guitar Party), Jacob Hanson (Halloween, Alaska, Guitar Party, Minneapolis Dub Ensemble), Haley Bonar, Luke Anderson (Rogue Valley, Alpha Centauri), and Mike Lewis (Happy Apple, Fat Kid Wednesdays, Andrew Bird, Gayngs) are all members of Gramma's Boyfriend, though the band's website states that "sometimes they all play together, sometimes its whoever shows up." They have released two albums on Graveface Records, 2013's Human Eye and 2015's Perm.

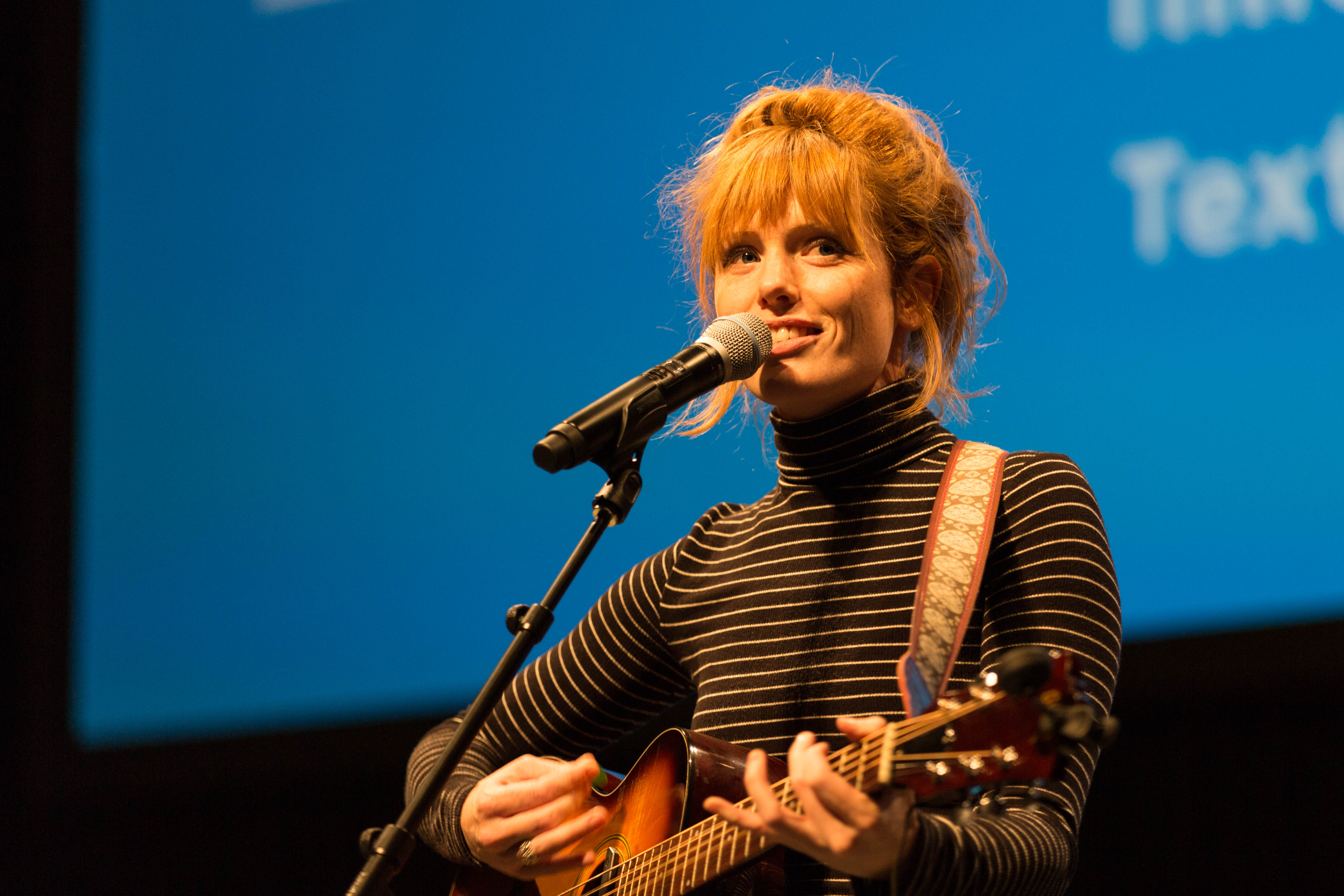
Haley at a Hillary Clinton campaign event in 2016

After two and a half years of writing and recording, Haley released the album Last War in May 2014. The album earned widespread critical acclaim, with Stephen Thompson of NPR calling Haley "a bright, subtle storyteller, [who] displays a mastery of pop-rock craftsmanship that keeps these songs as relentlessly catchy on the surface as they are alluringly complex underneath." SPIN lauded the track "No Sensitive Man" as "dynamic, demanding," while Consequence of Sound stated that "Bonar creates a whimsical masterclass of indie-pop songwriting." The album earned spots on best-of-2014 lists from Rough Trade, NPR's All Songs Considered, Village Voice and Wondering Sound, the latter of which said of the album, "It’s a bold, confident statement, and it’s an early pick for one of the year’s best."

Her album Impossible Dream was released in August 2016. Richard Godwin of the London Evening Standard gave the album 4 of 5 stars, calling her "simply a wonderful songwriter, with a rare gift for a moody hook that calls to mind a less comatose Beach House, or a punkier Aimee Mann."

2018's Pleasureland album, the first recorded under the name Haley, is completely instrumental. She stated that this was a response to her difficulty in expressing her feelings lyrically after the 2016 U.S. election. Saxophonist Mike Lewis of jazz band Happy Apple guests on the song "Pig Latin." Steve Horowitz of Popmatters rated the album 7 out of 10, calling the album "very different than what Haley has done before" and noting that the songs "have a pensive tone, yet are also a bit disquieting," but that "there is an easy grace to the material." Pablo Gorondi of the Associated Press said the album "purges power-pop and expands the cinematic feel," and that even without lyrics, the album showed Haley "expressing and sharing her emotions in daring fashion."

In 2023 Haley released her 11th studio album, Hunca Munca, a project begun during the COVID-19 pandemic. The album was inspired by Beatrix Potter's The Tale of Two Bad Mice and the murder of George Floyd and subsequent unrest centered in her Twin Cities hometown.

== Personal life and name change ==
In 2017, Haley announced that she would be changing her performing name to simply "Haley," and her legal name to Haley McCallum, the surname of her grandfather, a Scottish name that she noted means "a person of peace". She called the change a "very personal and joyful decision."

== Discography ==
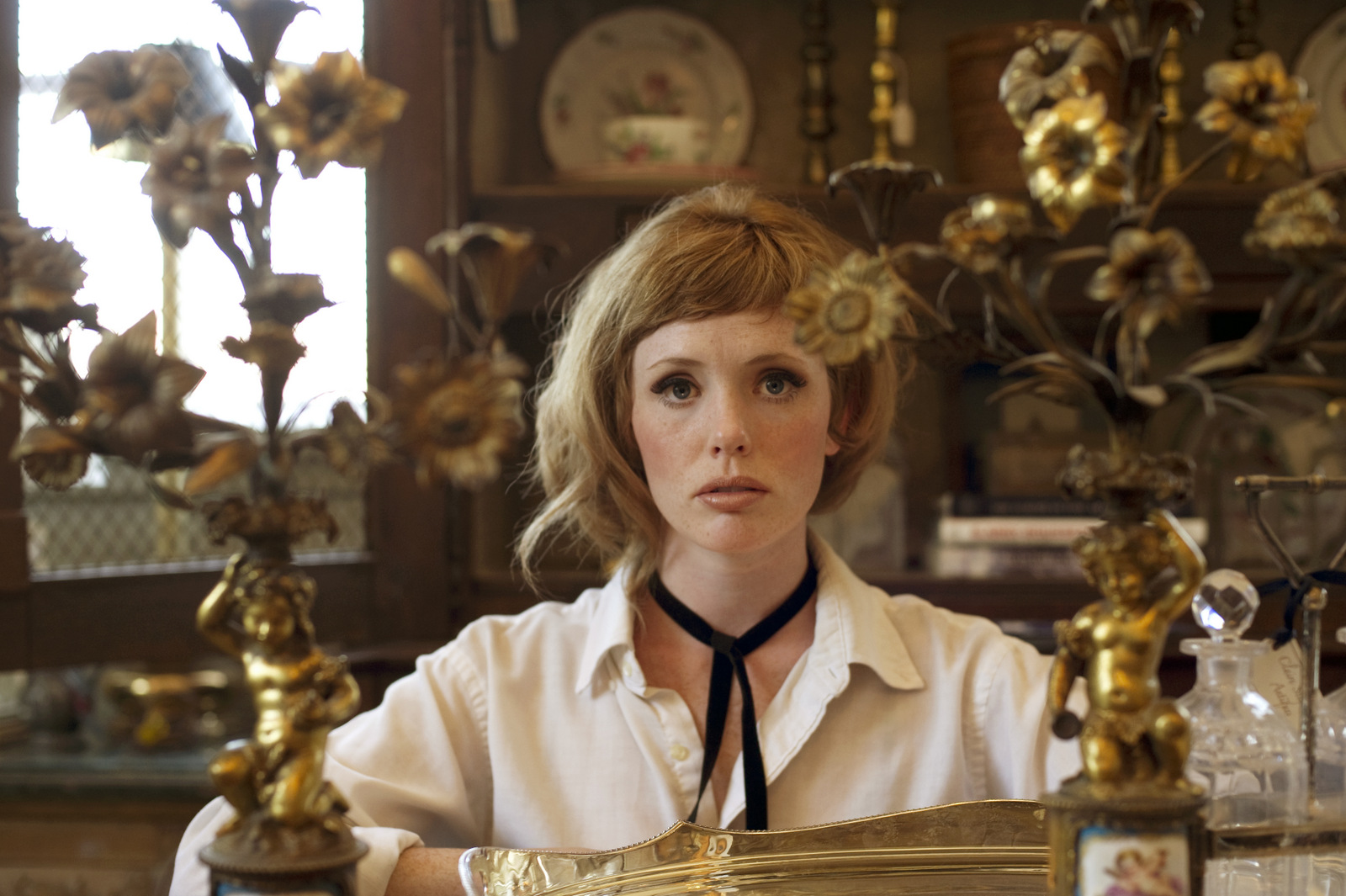
Haley in 2012

=== Albums ===
- Haley Bryn Bonar (Slicktunes Recording, 2001)
- 9 Song Demo (Self released, 2002)
- ...The Size of Planets (Chairkickers Union, 2003)
- Lure the Fox (Afternoon Records, 2006)
- Big Star (Afternoon Records, 2008)
- Golder (Graveface Records, 2011)
- Last War (Graveface Records, 2014)
- Impossible Dream (Gndwire Records, 2016)
- Pleasureland (Memphis Industries, 2018) - Artist credited as ‘Haley’ not ‘Haley Bonar’.
- Hunca Munca (Graveface Records, 2023)

=== EPs ===
- Lure the Fox EP (Self released, 2004)
- Only X-Mas EP (Self released, 2008)
- Sing With Me EP (Self released, 2009)
- Leo EP (Self released, 2010)
- Bad Reputation 7" (Noiseland, 2012)
- Wntr Snds (Self released, 2013)
- ’’Bratt / My Wave - As ‘Haley’ (Memphis Industries - 2018)

=== with Gramma's Boyfriend ===
- Human Eye (Graveface, 2013)
- Perm (Graveface, 2015)
