= Pure Trash =

Studio album by Dosh
- Released: October 11, 2004
- Genres: Post-rock, instrumental hip-hop
- Length: 46:24
- Label: Anticon

Dosh chronology
Dosh (2002)	Pure Trash (2004)	The Lost Take (2006)

Professional ratings
Review scores
Source	Rating
AllMusic	3/5 stars
Brainwashed	favorable
Cokemachineglow	favorable
Drowned in Sound	7/10
Dusted Magazine	mixed
XLR8R	favorable

Pure Trash is the second solo studio album by American multi-instrumentalist Dosh. It was released on Anticon on October 11, 2004. It peaked at number 74 on the CMJ Top 200 chart.

== Critical reception ==
Mike Diver of Drowned in Sound gave the album a 7 out of 10, saying: "If there's a single criticism that can be genuinely levelled at this album, it's that it's a little too nice." Frosty of XLR8R called it "a splendid ode to staying home."

== Track listing ==
No.	Title	Length
1.	"Simple Exercises"	3:21
2.	"Dark Lord of Rhodes"	3:10
3.	"This Is When Things Were Looking Up"	3:14
4.	"Rock It to the Next Episode"	3:49
5.	"Bye Rhodsy"	3:22
6.	"I Think I'm Getting Married"	5:25
7.	"Bring the Happiness"	2:47
8.	"Geye"	3:38
9.	"Naoise"	3:30
10.	"Pure Trash"	5:05
11.	"Building a Strange Child"	3:14
12.	"The Last Plan"	5:51
