= Earthsick =

Studio album by Subtle
- Released: November 23, 2004
- Genre: Alternative hip hop
- Length: 65:51
- Label: A Purple 100

Subtle chronology
| A New White (2004) | Earthsick (2004) | Wishingbone (2006) |

Professional ratings
Review scores
| Source | Rating |
|---|---|
| Guts Of Darkness | 5/6 stars |

Earthsick is an album by American alternative hip hop sextet Subtle. It was released after the success of their first album A New White in the underground hip hop community.

It is a compilation of what the band considered to be the best of the four previously released Season EPs, which are now out of print. Tracks 11 through 14 are previously unreleased material from a winter solstice session recorded the previous year and are, like the Winter EP, completely improvised with no overdubs.

== Note from the band ==
In the liner notes of Earthsick a note issued by the band can be found. It says the following:

"Earthsick was recorded on many devices over the course of two years 2001 to 2003 by subtle in our bedrooms... on our rooftops... and so on... mixed on our computers...we took things from what we thought was wrong with the world, it being a sickness to live...these songs were released on the four season ep's along with their brother and sister songs which are now out of print..."

== Track listing ==
1. Flying Horse Plans (3:05)
2. Eneby Kurs (5:28)
3. Arsenic Chic (3:52)
4. Earthsick (7:08)
5. Jr's Band (3:28)
6. Wallet Falls (3:00)
7. Untitled (3:36)
8. Less Populated Earth (3:37)
9. Skullz (3:06)
10. The Teeth Behind the Wheel (5:01)
11. Track 11 (3:09)
12. Track 12 (9:45)
13. Track 13 (2:15)
14. Track 14 (9:15)
