= Kenneth Biggs =

Kenneth Alfred Biggs
- Born: 26 February 1911; Greenway, Totteridge, Hertfordshire, England
- Died: 11 January 1998 (aged 86); Ewhurst, Surrey, England
- Military career
- Allegiance: United Kingdom
- Branch: British Army
- Service years: 1940−1946
- Rank: Major
- Service number: 173490
- Unit: Royal Army Ordnance Corps
- Conflicts: World War II: Burma campaign
- Awards: George Cross (GC); Bronze Star (United States)
- Other work: Bank manager for Midland Bank

Major Kenneth Alfred Biggs GC (26 February 1911 − 11 January 1998) was a British Army officer of the Royal Army Ordnance Corps (RAOC) who was awarded the George Cross (GC) for gallantry in his actions in rescuing people from an ammunition train on 2 January 1946 in Savernake Forest, Wiltshire, and preventing a major explosion.

== Early life ==
Biggs was born on 26 February 1911 in Greenway, Totteridge in Hertfordshire. He was educated at Tollington School, Muswell Hill and from there joined the Midland Bank. He married Jane in 1938.

== Army service ==
He joined the British Army in 1940 during World War II, initially serving in the ranks, he was a lance corporal when he was commissioned as a second lieutenant in the Royal Army Ordnance Corps (RAOC) on 26 December 1940. His service was all in the Middle East and Far East, he was away from home for five years. He was trained as in the supply and storage of ammunition, initially supporting British forces in Palestine and Iraq, before being posted to India where he was involved in the supply of ammunition to the Fourteenth Army for the Burma campaign.

By 1946, when the war was over, when Biggs was a captain and temporary major, he had returned to the United Kingdom, being stationed at CAD Corsham whilst nearing demobilisation.

== Award of the George Cross ==
On 2 January 1946, he was at an ammunition depot in Savernake Forest when ammunition being loaded from lorries into railway trucks caught fire. A three-ton lorry, and two twenty-tonne railway wagons were destroyed almost immediately. Secondary explosions then destroyed two more lorries and 27 wagons. In addition to the train being loaded, there was also a fully loaded train in the freight yard, in all 96 wagons, containing 2000 tons of explosive (5.5 inch artillery shells and mines), were threatened by the blaze. It is probable that had all this material been detonated, in addition to killing all the personnel present, severe damage would have been caused to the nearby town of Marlborough.

The first person on the scene to attempt to control the situation was Staff Sergeant Sidney George Rogerson (who was also to be awarded the GC for his actions). Rogerson organised the removal of the most seriously wounded, and personally rescued several from under the burning trucks. Biggs then arrived on the scene, and took command as the senior officer present. He rallied the men, despite the threat posed by the cordite charges of the shells being set off by the heat, firing them at random. He personally uncoupled one blazing wagon, with the assistance of another officer, pushed it to a safe distance, and extinguished it. Due to their efforts 69 wagons of ammunition were saved, it took until late morning on 3 January for the last fires to be extinguished. Even then, unexploded shells and detonators left the area, which was now reminiscent of a First World War battlefield, extremely hazardous.

In addition to GCs for Biggs and Rogerson, an MBE, two George Medals and five British Empire Medals were awarded to those present. Biggs also received the Bronze Star, as a proportion of the ammunition was American.

The award was announced in the London Gazette of 8 October 1946, with the citation dated 11 October 1946:

The KING has been graciously pleased to approve the award of the GEORGE CROSS, in recognition of most conspicuous gallantry in carrying out hazardous work in a very brave manner, to the undermentioned: —

Captain (temporary Major) Kenneth Alfred BIGGS (173490), Royal Army Ordnance Corps (London, N.10). No. 10536260 Corporal (acting Staff-Sergeant) Sidney George ROGERSON, Royal Army Ordnance Corps

(Caterham, Surrey).

He received his medal from King George VI at Buckingham Palace on 10 December 1946.

== Award of the Bronze Star Medal ==
On 22 February 1946 at the US Army HQ, Colonel Thele US Army, on behalf of the President of the United States of America, presented the Bronze Star Medal for gallant conduct to Major Kenneth A Biggs RAOC. The citation read:

"Major Kenneth A Biggs, Army Serial No 173490, Royal Army Ordnance Corps, British Army, distinguished himself by meritorious achievement of service at the North Savernake Railhead, Savernake Ammunition Depot, Marlborough, Wilts, England, on 2 January 1946. Major Biggs displayed exceptional devotion to duty by assisting to save valuable equipment and ammunition with complete disregard for his personal safety."

"The superior devotion to duty and leadership displayed by Major Biggs reflects very high credit on him and the Armed Forces of the British Army."

== Later life ==
After demobilisation he returned to his banking career, becoming a bank manager for Midland Bank, initially in the Sloane Square branch, and later in Muswell Hill and Edmonton. He retired in 1971, initially moving to Stockland, Devon. He eventually returned to Ewhurst, Surrey. His wife, Jane, died in 1995.

Biggs died on 11 January 1998, at the age of 86 and just a few weeks short of his eighty-seventh birthday.
