= For Hero: For Fool =

Studio album by Subtle
- Released: October 3, 2006
- Genre: Hip-hop
- Length: 51:09
- Label: Lex Records
- Producer: Subtle

Subtle chronology
A New White (2004)	For Hero: For Fool (2006)	Exiting Arm (2008)

Singles from For Hero: For Fool
- 1. "The Mercury Craze" Released: 2006

Professional ratings
Aggregate scores
Source	Rating
Metacritic	85/100
Review scores
Source	Rating
AllMusic	4/5 stars
Alternative Press	4/5 stars
Cokemachineglow	90%
Drowned in Sound	10/10
Pitchfork	8.0/10
Playlouder	5/5 stars
PopMatters	7/10
Q	3.5/5 stars
Stylus	B+
Uncut	8/10

For Hero: For Fool is the second studio album by American hip-hop sextet Subtle. It was released on Lex Records in 2006. "The Mercury Craze" was released as a single from the album.

== Critical reception ==
At Metacritic, which assigns a weighted average score out of 100 to reviews from mainstream critics, the album received an average score of 85% based on 14 reviews, indicating "universal acclaim".

Marisa Brown of AllMusic gave the album 4 stars out of 5, describing it as "a complex, innovative, sometimes bizarre, and usually utterly confusing journey into the minds of lyricist Doseone and his five bandmates." Neal Hayes of PopMatters gave the album 7 stars out of 10, saying, "the Oakland-based group presents a futuristic musical vision that is vivid, unsettling, and, above all, distinctive."

OC Weekly included it on the "Album Covers of the Year" list.

== Track listing ==
No.	Title	Length
1.	"A Tale of Apes I"	3:18
2.	"A Tale of Apes II"	2:13
3.	"Middleclass Stomp"	4:14
4.	"Middleclass Kill"	4:36
5.	"Midas Gutz"	2:37
6.	"Nomanisisland"	4:20
7.	"The Mercury Craze"	4:40
8.	"Bed to the Bills"	4:50
9.	"Return of the Vein"	4:11
10.	"Call to Dive"	7:08
11.	"The Ends"	8:57

== Personnel ==
Credits adapted from liner notes.

Subtle

- Dax Pierson – vocals, harmonica
- Alexander Kort – electric cello, acoustic cello, electric bass, acoustic bass
- Jordan Dalrymple – drums, guitar, synthesizer, vocals
- Jeffrey "Jel" Logan – drum machine
- Marty Kalani Dowers – woodwinds, synthesizer
- Adam "Doseone" Drucker – words, vocals, treatment, artwork

Technical personnel

- Subtle – recording
- Tony Espinoza – mixing
