= Subtle (band) =

American hip-hop group

- Origin: Oakland, California, United States
- Genres: Electronic, indie rock, alternative hip-hop
- Years active: 2001-2008
- Labels: Lex Records, Astralwerks (distribution), EMI (distribution)
- Members: Adam Drucker (Doseone); Jeffrey Logan (Jel); Dax Pierson; Jordan Dalrymple; Marty Dowers; Alexander Kort

Subtle was an alternative hip-hop sextet from Oakland, California. It consisted of Adam Drucker (Doseone), Jeffrey Logan (Jel), Dax Pierson, Jordan Dalrymple, Alexander Kort, and Marty Dowers. The band was formed in 2001. While considered by the artists to be "genreless", Subtle had close ties to the hip-hop and indie music scene. Although both Doseone and Jel are members of Anticon collective, Subtle was not on the Anticon label roster. Subtle was signed to Lex Records.

== Personnel ==
The six member band consisted of:

- Adam "Doseone" Drucker - vocals and samples
- Jeffrey "Jel" Logan - sampling, drum machine
- Jordan Dalrymple - drums, guitar, synth and vocals
- Dax Pierson - vocals, keyboards/synths, harmonica, autoharp
- Marton Dowers - winds, synth
- Alexander Kort - electric cello

== History ==
=== The Season EPs and Earthsick ===
Subtle began in 2001 when Dax Pierson, an employee at the Amoeba Music record store in Berkeley, CA., met Adam Drucker at the record store. Drucker is a founding member of the Anticon collective/record label. They decided to try to make some music together. The first time they got together, Pierson also invited Alexander Kort to the session, whom Pierson had collaborated on performing, composing and improvising a score for some classic silent films (Marty Dowers was also a part of these collaborations). Later that year, Pierson was invited to an open mic show and invited other musicians to form a one-time group for a predominately improvised twenty-minute performance. Members of that performance's group were, woodwind/synth player Marty Dowers, drummer/guitarist Jordan Dalrymple, and cellist Alexander Kort—all of whom Pierson had previously played with. Dowers and Darlrymple were also fellow employees at Amoeba Music. Everyone enjoyed playing together so much, they decided to continue on as a group and added sixth member mpc/drum machinist Jeff Logan, another founding member of Anticon and along with partner in crime, Adam Drucker, member of the duo, Themselves.

Over the course of 2002 and 2003 Subtle released their four 'season' EPs (Summer, Autumn, Winter and Spring). A selection of tracks from these recordings (stated by the band to be the best songs of the EPs) were eventually collated on the compilation album Earthsick. Both of these projects were composed mostly of homemade recordings and were all released on Doseone's own label, A Purple 100.

'Winter' consisted solely of one 37-minute track which was entirely improvised, at midnight on winter solstice. Similar to this, Earthsick included four untitled, previously unreleased tracks, all of which were completely improvised with no overdubs. Chronologically, the improvised Earthsick recordings took place the year following the recording of the music that makes up 'Winter'.

=== A New White and Wishingbone ===
In 2003 the band signed to Lex Records and, in 2004, released their first proper full-length, A New White. This album spawned the single "F.K.O.", which stands for "Fuck Kelly Osbourne". Introduced on the record, and a recurring character in much of Subtle's work, is 'Hour Hero Yes', an aspiring middle-class poet and rapper. He is mentioned throughout the two Subtle LPs and both remix compilations, as well as in the 13 & God song "Ghostwork". Album and video artwork, as well as art on Subtle's official website, suggest Hour Hero Yes to be a bald man with a black and white striped face—an image which is embodied by a bust that serves as a centerpiece prop during live Subtle shows. Their live shows are particularly noted for their theatricality, incorporating hand-painted backdrops, set props, "costumes", and theatrical monologues that go alongside the musical performances.

In 2006 the band released Wishingbone, a sister album to A New White containing remixes of tracks from that album as well as new material and remixes by Subtle themselves. Three music videos were released on the DVD included with the album, all of which were produced by animation company SSSR. SSSR also created the video for 'The Mercury Craze'.

=== Tour Van Accident ===
While on tour to promote A New White in 2005, the band's van went off the road after hitting a patch of black ice on a highway in Iowa. The driver, live sound engineer Patrick Scott and five members of the band sustained minor injuries, while a member, Dax Pierson, was seriously injured. Dax's upper spine was severely damaged in the accident, leaving him a quadriplegic. Dax continues to contribute to the band, but as of now, does not tour.

=== For Hero: For Fool ===
Subtle signed a distribution deal with Astralwerks/EMI as of July 2006. For Hero: For Fool was released in October 2006 on Lex/Astralwerks/EMI. Dax Pierson, rendered quadriplegic by their tour accident in 2005, contributed beatboxing, vocals and harmonica to the album and his contribution is prominently displayed on the final track, 'The Ends'. The album was received very well by critics, with Cokemachineglow declaring it their 2006 album of the year. 'The Mercury Craze' was released as a 7" Vinyl and CD single and is used as an opening for the German TV show Spam Deluxe (Giga).

It is intended that Subtle's first three studio albums (A New White, For Hero: For Fool and ExitingARM) will serve as a trilogy about the rise and fall of the character Hour Hero Yes, and the character may indeed live on throughout the course of all their studio output, with the lyrics derived from his perspective. On the cover of 'For Hero: For Fool' he appears in old military garb, with fire for hair.

=== Tour Robbery ===
In November 2006, while on tour in Europe, their tour van was robbed in Barcelona. Bags containing $15,000 worth of gear and personal belongings were stolen, including a laptop containing demos, draft lyrics and unreleased work. To try to recover some of the funds, Doseone drew personalised portraits of fans from photos they would send in.

=== Yell&Ice ===
Released in October 2007, Yell&Ice is a collection of remakes and remixes, featuring collaborations with Why?, Dan Boeckner of Wolf Parade, Tunde Adebimpe of TV on the Radio, Markus Acher of the Notwist, and Chris Adams of Hood (band). Just as 'Wishingbone' revisited Subtle's first LP 'A New White', Yell&Ice explores and reinterprets their preceding full-length, 'for hero: for fool'.

Both Wishingbone and Yell&Ice were fashioned to further explore Subtle's conceptual protagonist, Hour Hero yes, while creating a medium for the band's love of collaborative music making. Doseone has likened the albums to early rap maxi-singles which would contain tracks with the same backing music but different vocals.

Unlike a typical collection of remixes, Yell&Ice utterly reapproaches the lyrics and music of for hero: for fool. In order to better suit the palette and prowess of each respective collaborator, lyrics were rewritten, sounds resampled, and time signatures unlocked. These songbones were then sent to various collaborators who then rewrote, sang, and sequenced to the tune of their talents.

=== ExitingARM ===
ExitingARM is the third album "in the ever-widening epic of Hour Hero Yes" and is accompanied by its own website with further poems on Yes's journey. The album was an attempt to create a more accessible sound and was released on May 13, 2008.

=== OughtAlmanac of AmassedFact Vol.I ===
During the ExitingARM tour, the OughtAlmanac of AmassedFact Vol.I was available for purchase at Subtle's merchandise booth. Limited to 100 pieces, all hand painted by Doseone, the Almanac is a 70-page book that acts as a guide for the world in which Subtle's protagonist, HourHeroYES, resides. All copies of the Almanac have the first and last pages torn out except for a small bit, where it is numbered and signed. The OughtAlmanac of AmassedFact Vol.I is accompanied by a 65 track mp3 CD of Dose reading the Almanac in its entirety. The improvisational sessions that later became ExitingARM as well as the crackle of a blank record make up the background noise for the reading on the CD. There is an online version of the book/CD.

=== WASHERE ===
The first live subtle album contains a collection of 'hand-picked' live songs, alternate versions, and "original session" improvisations from their past five years of touring. "WASHERE" includes tracks from the rehearsals for the "a new white" tour. These "live at the mansion" sessions are some of the only live performances that were recorded before the tour accident that left Dax Pierson quadriplegic.

=== SmallFear Souvenir ===
Similar to what 'Wishingbone' was to 'A New White' and 'Yell&Ice' to 'For Hero:For Fool', SmallFear Souvenir will be a remix/ re-interpretation album of ExitingARM. Artists confirmed to be working on it are Alias (Sick Soft Perfection), Thee More Shallows (Day Dangerous), Black Moth Super Rainbow (GoneBones), Genghis Tron (Take To Take) and Trans Am (The No).

== Discography ==
=== Albums ===
- A New White (2004)
- For Hero: For Fool (2006)
- ExitingARM (2008)

=== EPs ===
- Summer (2001)
- Autumn (2002)
- Winter (2002)
- Spring (2003)

=== Singles ===
- "F.K.O." (2004)
- "The Long Vein of the Law" (2004)
- "The Mercury Craze" (2006)

=== Compilations ===
- Earthsick (2004)
- Wishingbone (2006)
- The Subtle6 Mix (2006)
- Yell&Ice (2007)
- OughtAlmanac of AmassedFact Vol.I (2008) Limited edition book and CD-R of MP3s

=== Live albums ===
- WASHERE (2008)
