= The Lost Take =

Studio album by Dosh
- Released: October 17, 2006
- Genres: Post-rock, instrumental hip-hop
- Length: 40:24
- Label: Anticon

Dosh chronology
| Pure Trash (2004) | The Lost Take (2006) | Wolves and Wishes (2008) |

Professional ratings
Review scores
| Source | Rating |
|---|---|
| AllMusic | 3.5/5 stars |
| Pitchfork | 7.7/10 |
| Treble | favorable |
| XLR8R | favorable |

The Lost Take is the third solo studio album by American multi-instrumentalist Dosh. It was released on Anticon on October 17, 2006.

== Critical reception ==
Marisa Brown of AllMusic gave the album 3.5 stars out of 5, saying: "In terms of what Dosh has always done, The Lost Take isn't drastically different: it's experimental instrumental music that hesitates to adhere itself too firmly to any categorization, but it's a consistent and interesting release nonetheless, and probably the best of his career."

The Lost Take was named No. 7 in a list of the top 10 Minnesota records of 2006 in the Star Tribune's survey of Twin Cities music critics.

== Track listing ==
| No. | Title | Length |
|---|---|---|
| 1. | "One Through Seven" | 3:03 |
| 2. | "Everybody Cheer Up Song" | 3:17 |
| 3. | "Um, Circles and Squares" | 3:03 |
| 4. | "A Ghost's Business" | 3:13 |
| 5. | "Ship Wreck" | 3:47 |
| 6. | "Mpls Rock and Roll" | 3:19 |
| 7. | "Fireball" | 3:20 |
| 8. | "Unemployed Blues" | 2:42 |
| 9. | "Pink Floyd Cowboy Song" | 4:07 |
| 10. | "O Mexico" | 3:50 |
| 11. | "Bottom of a Well" | 3:16 |
| 12. | "The Lost Take" | 3:28 |
