= A New White =

Studio album by Subtle
- Released: October 5, 2004
- Genre: Hip-hop
- Length: 40:03
- Label: Lex Records
- Producer: Subtle

Subtle chronology
A New White (2004)	For Hero: For Fool (2006)

Singles from A New White
- 1. "F.K.O." Released: 2004; 2. "The Long Vein of the Law" Released: 2005

Professional ratings
Review scores
Source	Rating
Drowned in Sound	9/10
Pitchfork	7.8/10
PopMatters	7/10 stars
Stylus Magazine	B−
XLR8R	favorable

A New White is the first studio album by American hip-hop sextet Subtle. It was released on Lex Records in 2004. "F.K.O." and "The Long Vein of the Law" were released as singles from the album. The album peaked at number 55 on the CMJ Top 200 chart, as well as number 10 on CMJ's RPM chart.

== Critical reception ==
Brian Howe of Pitchfork gave the album a 7.8 out of 10, describing it as "an chimera cobbled together from live and programmed drums, electronic strings, keyboards, samplers, guitars, woodwinds, and Doseone's chameleonic flows." Lee Henderson of PopMatters gave the album 7 stars out of 10, saying, "Subtle provides you with some of Doseone's best lyrics and art since his work with Boom Bip, accompanied by some of the best compositions anyone has created from the Anticon unit all told."

== Track listing ==
No.	Title	Length
1.	"Song Meat"	4:35
2.	"I ♥ L.A."	3:56
3.	"The Long Vein of the Law"	3:30
4.	"Red, White & Blonde"	3:18
5.	"Silence..."	3:41
6.	"The Hook"	3:13
7.	"F.K.O."	3:51
8.	"Eyewash"	3:04
9.	"Hand Replacement"	2:47
10.	"She"	4:21
11.	"Stiff Fruit"	3:39

== Personnel ==
Credits adapted from liner notes.

Subtle

- Dax Pierson – keyboards, sampler, melodica
- Alexander Kort – electric cello, acoustic cello, electric bass, acoustic bass
- Jordan Dalrymple – drums, guitar, sampler
- Jeffrey "Jel" Logan – drum machine
- Marty Kalani Dowers – woodwinds, synthesizer
- Adam "Doseone" Drucker – words, vocals, synthesizer, artwork

Additional musicians

- J. Goody – trumpet (on "Song Meat")

Technical personnel

- Subtle – recording, mixing
- J. Goody – recording, mixing
