= Anticon discography =

The following is an incomplete discography for Anticon, an independent hip hop record label based in Los Angeles, California. Artists such as Sole, Buck 65, Odd Nosdam, Alias, and Jel have released records through Anticon.

== Discography ==
Combined discography of Anticon (cat. ABR) and subsidiary label 6months (cat. 6M). Singles are not included.

1998

- Anticon (VA) - Hip Hop Music for the Advanced Listener (#ABR0001)

1999

- Anticon (VA) - Music for the Advancement of Hip Hop (#ABR0002)
- Deep Puddle Dynamics - The Taste of Rain... Why Kneel? (#ABR0009)
- DJ Mayonnaise - 55 Stories (#ABR0005)

2000

- Themselves - Them (#ABR0010)
- Sole - Bottle of Humans (#ABR0011)

2001

- Sixtoo - Songs I Hate (And Other People's Moments) (#6M0001)
- Jel - Greenball (#6M0004)
- Restiform Bodies - Restiform Bodies (#6M0005)
- Anticon (VA) - Giga Single (#ABR0014)
- Why? / Odd Nosdam - The Why? & Odd Nosdam Split EP! (#ABR0017)
- Buck 65 - Man Overboard (#ABR0015)
- Controller 7 - Left Handed Straw (#6M0006)

2002

- Alias - Three Phase Irony Double EP (#6M0002)
- Deep Puddle Dynamics - We Ain't Fessin' (Double Quotes) (#ABR0019)
- Sage Francis - Personal Journals (#ABR0021)
- Alias - The Other Side of the Looking Glass (#ABR0022)
- Sole - Learning to Walk (#6M0003)
- Themselves - The No Music (#ABR0025)
- L'Roneous - Imaginarium (#6M0007)
- Josh Martinez - Rumble Pie (#6M0008)

2003

- Sole - Selling Live Water (#ABR0026)
- Sage Francis - The Makeshift Patriot EP (#ABR0027)
- Odd Nosdam - No More Wig for Ohio (#ABR0028)
- Why? - Oaklandazulasylum (#ABR0029)
- Alias - Eyes Closed EP (#ABR0033)
- Dosh - Dosh (#ABR0032)
- Themselves - The No Music of AIFFs (#ABR0034)
- Why? - The Early Whitney EP (#ABR0035)
- Alias - Muted (#ABR0036)
- Anticon / Beyond Space (VA) - Beyond Space Presents: Vol. 1 (#6Mxxxx)

2004

- Anticon (VA) - Anticon Label Sampler: 1999-2004 (#ABR0031)
- Josh Martinez - Buck Up Princess (#6Mxxxx)
- Odd Nosdam - Your American Bonus - Buy David Odd Nosdam (#ABR0040)
- Passage - The Forcefield Kids (#ABR0038)
- The Bomarr Monk - Surface Sincerity Soundtrack (#ABR0045)
- Dosh - Naoise EP (#ABR0042)
- Dosh - Pure Trash (#ABR0043)
- Telephone Jim Jesus - A Point Too Far to Astronaut (#ABR0046)

2005

- Pedestrian - Volume One: UnIndian Songs (#ABR0044)
- Sole - Live from Rome (#ABR0048)
- 13 & God - 13 & God (#ABR0050)
- Why? - Sanddollars EP (#ABR0052)
- Odd Nosdam - Burner (#ABR0053)
- Alias & Ehren - Lillian (#ABR0054)
- Why? - Elephant Eyelash (#ABR0055)
- JD Walker - Them Get You... Them Got You (#6M007CD)

2006

- Why? - Rubber Traits (#ABR0061)
- Jel - Soft Money (#ABR0056)
- Alias & Tarsier - Brookland/Oaklyn (#ABR0059)
- Peeping Tom - Peeping Tom (#ABR0064)
- Darc Mind - Symptomatic of a Greater Ill (#ABR0063)
- Alias & Tarsier - Plane That Draws a White Line (#ABR0066)
- Dosh - The Lost Take (#ABR0067)

2007

- Bracken - We Know About the Need (#ABR0069)
- SJ Esau - Wrong Faced Cat Feed Collapse (#ABR0001)
- Bracken - Eno About the Need (#ABR0069B)
- Thee More Shallows - Book of Bad Breaks (#ABR0072)
- Alias - Collected Remixes (#ABR0071)
- Mansbestfriend - Poly.Sci.187 (#ABR0073)
- DJ Mayonnaise - Still Alive (#ABR0075)
- Odd Nosdam - Level Live Wires (#ABR0074)
- Telephone Jim Jesus - Anywhere Out of the Everything (#ABR0077)
- Sole and the Skyrider Band - Sole and the Skyrider Band (#ABR0078)
- Bracken - Remixes (#ABR0081)

2008

- Why? - The Hollows (#ABR0079)
- Son Lux - At War with Walls & Mazes (#ABR0082)
- Why? - Alopecia (#ABR0080)
- Dosh - Wolves and Wishes (#ABR0084)
- Odd Nosdam - Pretty Swell Explode (#ABR0083)
- SJ Esau - Small Vessel (#ABR0085)
- Alias - Resurgam (#ABR0087)
- Restiform Bodies - TV Loves You Back (#ABR0088)
- Tobacco - Fucked Up Friends (#ABR0089)
- Anathallo - Canopy Glow (#ABR0090)

2009

- Odd Nosdam - T.I.M.E. Soundtrack (#ABR0092)
- Themselves - The Free Houdini (#ABR0095)
- Bike for Three! - More Heart Than Brains (#ABR0093)
- Serengeti & Polyphonic - Terradactyl (#ABR0094)
- Why? - Eskimo Snow (#ABR0098)
- Themselves - CrownsDown (#ABR0096)

2010

- Son Lux - Weapons EP (#ABR0099)
- Josiah Wolf - Jet Lag (#ABR0100)
- Dosh - Tommy (#ABR0101)
- Tobacco - Maniac Meat (#ABR0103)
- Baths - Cerulean (#ABR0105)
- Themselves - CrownsDown & Company (#ABR0106)
- Saroos - See Me Not (#ABR0107)
- Tobacco - LA UTI (#ABR0109)
- Tobacco - Mystic Thickness (#ABR103CD)
- Tha Grimm Teachaz - There's a Situation on the Homefront (#ABR0110)

2011

- 13 & God - Own Your Ghost (#ABR0104)
- Beans - End It All (#ABR0108)
- Serengeti - Family & Friends (#ABR0111)
- Antonionian - Antonionian (#ABR0112)
- Son Lux - We Are Rising (#ABR0114)
- Alias - Fever Dream (#ABR0115)
- Raleigh Moncrief - Watered Lawn (#ABR0117)

2012

- Serengeti - C.A.R. (#ABR0118)
- S/S/S - Beak & Claw (#ABR0119)
- Kenny Dennis - Kenny Dennis EP (#ABR0120)
- Doseone - G Is for Deep (#ABR0121)
- Isaiah Toothtaker - Sea Punk Funk (#ABRxxxx)
- Why? - Sod in the Seed (#ABR0126)
- Why? - Mumps, Etc. (#ABR0128)
- Bay Blue - Bay Blue (#ABR0125)

2013

- Young Fathers - Tape One (#ABR0132)
- D33J - Tide Songs (#ABR0130)
- Baths - Obsidian (#ABR0138)
- Young Fathers - Tape Two (#ABR0134)
- Serengeti - Kenny Dennis LP (#ABR0131)
- Jel - Late Pass (#ABR0137)
- Knifefight - Knifefight (#ABR0139)
- Daedelus - Drown Out (#ABR0140)
- D33J - Gravel (#ABR0136)
- Serengeti - C.A.B. (#ABR0123)

2014

- Young Fathers - Dead (#ABR0142)
- Alias - Indiiggo (#ABR0145)
- Baths - Ocean Death (#ABR0146)
- Alias - Pitch Black Prism (#ABR0143)
