= Soft Skulls =

Studio album by Doseone
- Released: 2007
- Genre: Spoken word

Doseone chronology
Ha (2005)	Soft Skulls (2007)	Skeleton Repellent (2007)

Soft Skulls is a spoken word album by American indie hip-hop artist Doseone. It was released in 2007. It is available online from the Doseone Gigastore and at Subtle shows. It is limited to 500 copies.

It consists of poems, some of which are lyrics to songs by Themselves, Subtle and 13 & God; groups which Doseone is a member of.

== Track listing ==
1. Oldman And Beyond - 0:18
2. The No Place Of An Ache - 0:57
3. Crows Know - 2:34
4. The Garter - 0:11
5. Ode To Blonde Dylan - 2:02
6. Workingman's Hope - 0:16
7. Midas Gutz - 3:07
8. Low Heaven - 0:58
9. Deadcat Clearer - 2:45
10. By Knifelight - 0:50
11. Oldage Oldage - 2:50
12. Sober Proof - 0:16
13. Nomanisisland - 2:41
14. Ode To Blonde Dylan II - 1:02
15. Terror Fabulous - 1:53
16. Eyewash - 2:24
17. Ghost Personal - 0:11
18. Musicbox Of Ants - 3:20
19. Wind Spoting - 0:17
20. Silence - 1:53
21. Blueprint For The Crow - 0:13
22. Goldteeth Will Roll - 2:56
23. Armor - 0:54
