= 13 & God (album) =

Studio album by 13 & God
- Released: May 3, 2005
- Studio: Alien Research Center
- Genres: Hip-hop; indie rock; electronica
- Length: 49:26
- Labels: Anticon; Alien Transistor

13 & God chronology
| 13 & God (2005) | Own Your Ghost (2011) |

Singles from 13 & God
- 1. "Men of Station / Soft Atlas" Released: 2005

13 & God is the first studio album by 13 & God, a collaboration between American hip-hop group Themselves and German rock band The Notwist. It was released on Anticon and Alien Transistor in 2005. "Men of Station / Soft Atlas" was released as a single from the album.

== Critical reception ==
Professional ratings
Aggregate scores
| Source | Rating |
|---|---|
| Metacritic | 80/100 |
Review scores
| Source | Rating |
| AllMusic | 4/5 stars |
| Alternative Press | 4/5 stars |
| Cokemachineglow | 65% |
| Drowned in Sound | 8/10 |
| Pitchfork | 8.1/10 |
| Playlouder | 4/5 stars |
| PopMatters | 7/10 |
| Stylus | B− |
| Uncut | 8/10 |
| Under the Radar | 9/10 |

At Metacritic, which assigns a weighted average score out of 100 to reviews from mainstream critics, the album received an average score of 80, based on 20 reviews, indicating "generally favorable reviews".

Tim DiGravina of AllMusic gave the album 4 stars out of 5, describing it as "a decidedly dark and murky musical excursion into a realm of percolating electronics, moody jazz elements, bizarre raps, ethereal acoustic guitars, and sad pianos." He added: "While there's a sense that both artists went a bit too heavy on dark atmosphere, given that both usually inject more whimsy into their creations, 13 & God is still a consistently intriguing, frequently beautiful experiment that offers ample rewards with each new listen." Melissa Wheeler of Exclaim! called it "a gorgeous, pensive and gently dark album of rap-sprinkled mutated electronic indie rock". Adrien Begrand of PopMatters gave the album 7 stars out of 10, stating: "It's an album that requires patience from both hip-hop devotees and IDM enthusiasts, but once it's allowed to grow on the listener, its own distinct beauty begins to surface with each subsequent listen."

== Track listing ==
All lyrics are written by Adam Drucker, except "Men of Station", "Perfect Speed", and "If" by Drucker and Markus Acher; all music is composed by 13 & God.

| No. | Title | Length |
|---|---|---|
| 1. | "Low Heaven" | 4:32 |
| 2. | "Men of Station" | 3:48 |
| 3. | "Ghostwork" | 5:45 |
| 4. | "Perfect Speed" | 3:36 |
| 5. | "Afterclap" | 3:51 |
| 6. | "Soft Atlas" | 3:51 |
| 7. | "Tin Strong" | 6:09 |
| 8. | "If" | 4:19 |
| 9. | "Superman on Ice" | 7:16 |
| 10. | "Walk" | 6:19 |
| Total length: | | 49:26 |

== Personnel ==
Credits adapted from liner notes.

13 & God

- Adam "Doseone" Drucker – vocals, sampler, synthesizer, melodica, field recording
- Jeff "Jel" Logan – vocals, sampler, turntables, drums
- Dax Pierson – vocals, piano, electric piano, melodica, organ, synthesizer, sampler, mouth percussion, bike party recording
- Markus Acher – vocals, guitar, banjo, keyboards, plugged piano, sampler, turntables, programming
- Micha Acher – bass guitar, keyboards, piano, trombone, programming, electronics, string arrangement, brass arrangement
- Martin Gretschmann – electronics, synthesizer, effects, processing, programming

Additional musicians

- Ulrich Wangenheim – clarinet (1, 5), flute (1, 5)
- Valerie Trebeljahr – vocals (1, 5, 6)
- Stefanie Bohm – vocals (3, 5, 6)
- Martin Messerschmid – drums (3, 10)
- Max Punktezahl – guitar (4, 10), delay (4, 10)
- Yoni Wolf – vocals (6)
- James Brandon Best – vocals (8)
- Sebastian Hess – cello (9)
- Flo Steinleitner – everything else
- God – afterclap

Technical personnel

- Martin Gretschmann – mixing
- Chris Blair – mastering
