= The Taste of Rain... Why Kneel =

Studio album by Deep Puddle Dynamics
- Released: 1999
- Recorded: 1998–1999
- Genre: Underground hip-hop
- Length: 61:15
- Label: Anticon
- Producers: DJ Abilities, Moodswing9, Jel, Ant, DJ Mayonnaise, Alias

Deep Puddle Dynamics chronology
The Taste of Rain... Why Kneel (1999)	We Ain't Fessin' (Double Quotes) (2002)

Singles from The Taste of Rain... Why Kneel
- 1. "Rainmen (Controller 7 Remix) / I Am Hip Hop" Released: 1999

The Taste of Rain... Why Kneel (sometimes stylized as The Taste of Rain...Why Kneel) is the only studio album by Deep Puddle Dynamics, a collaboration between Sole, Doseone, Alias, and Slug. It was released on Anticon in 1999. The title of the album comes from a "western haiku" by Jack Kerouac.

== Critical reception ==
Professional ratings
Review scores
Source	Rating
AllMusic	4/5 stars
Exclaim!	favorable

The album received a favorable coverage from URB, Spin, CMJ, and The Wire. It is part of Cokemachineglow's Top 60 Albums of the 2000s, appearing in the "Honorable Mentions" section. Michael Endelman of CMJ New Music Monthly said, "these cerebral MCs turn their emotional hang-ups (dejection, alienation, disaffection, etc.) into their calling card." Dave Segal of The Stranger called it "one of underground hiphop's most understatedly adventurous documents, both sonically and lyrically".

== Track listing ==
No.	Title	Producer(s)	Length
1.	"Deep Puddle Theme Song"	DJ Abilities	6:54
2.	"The Candle"	Moodswing9	5:53
3.	"Thought vs. Action"	DJ Abilities	3:50
4.	"Where the Wild Things Are"	DJ Abilities	5:23
5.	"June 26th, 1998"	Jel	6:19
6.	"The Scarecrow Speaks"	Ant	5:56
7.	"I Am Hip Hop (Move the Crowd)"	Jel	5:59
8.	"Heavy Ceiling"	Jel	5:29
9.	"June 26th, 1999: A. Slight"	DJ Mayonnaise	5:53
10.	"June 26th, 1999: B. Exist"	DJ Mayonnaise	3:04
11.	"June 26th, 1999: C. Purpose"	Alias	3:26
12.	"June 26th, 1999: D. Mothers of Invention"	Jel	3:04
Total length:			61:15

2002 reissue version bonus track
No.	Title	Producer(s)	Length
13.	"Rainmen" (Controller 7 Remix)	Controller 7	5:23
Total length:			66:38

== Personnel ==
Credits adapted from liner notes.

- Sole – vocals
- Doseone – vocals
- Alias – vocals, production (11)
- Slug – vocals
- DJ Abilities – production (1, 3, 4)
- Moodswing9 – production (2)
- Jel – production (5, 7, 8, 12)
- Ant – production (6)
- DJ Mayonnaise – production (9, 10)
