= Own Your Ghost =

Studio album by 13 & God
- Released: May 12, 2011
- Studios: Alien Research Center; Shipwreck
- Genres: Hip-hop; indie rock; electronica
- Length: 38:31
- Labels: Anticon; Alien Transistor

13 & God chronology
13 & God (2005)	Own Your Ghost (2011)

Singles from Own Your Ghost
- 1. "Oldage" Released: 2011

Own Your Ghost is the second studio album by 13 & God, a collaboration between American hip-hop group Themselves and German rock band The Notwist. It was released on Anticon and Alien Transistor in 2011.

== Critical reception ==
Professional ratings
Aggregate scores
Source	Rating
Metacritic	74/100
Review scores
Source	Rating
CMJ	favorable
Cokemachineglow	83/100
Exclaim!	favorable
Filter	81%
Impose	unfavorable
Pitchfork	6.0/10
PopMatters	6/10 stars
The Skinny	4/5 stars
Spin	7/10
URB	4.5/5 stars

At Metacritic, which assigns a weighted average score out of 100 to reviews from mainstream critics, the album received an average score of 74, based on 12 reviews, indicating "generally favorable reviews".

Brian Howe of Pitchfork gave the album a 6.0 out of 10, saying: "It's still a neat project with many moments of interest, but it's disappointing that the second album doesn't cohere overall any better than the first." Eric Hill of Exclaim! commented that "Own Your Ghost wins with a rare combination of velocity and depth to track and tackle these troubled times." Mary Kosearas of Filter gave the album a rating of 81%, stating: "Ten tracks mixed with complex beats and sharp vocals gradually mature into a harmony of both fresh and electronically manipulated sounds."

Cokemachineglow named it the 42nd best album of 2011.

== Track listing ==
All lyrics are written by Adam Drucker and Markus Acher; all music is composed by 13 & God.

No.	Title	Length
1.	"Its Own Sun"	2:44
2.	"Death Major"	4:26
3.	"Armored Scarves"	4:30
4.	"Janu Are"	3:32
5.	"Oldage"	3:24
6.	"Et Tu"	3:18
7.	"Death Minor"	3:56
8.	"Sure as Debt"	3:49
9.	"Beat on Us"	5:07
10.	"Unyoung"	3:39
Total length:		38:31

== Personnel ==
Credits adapted from liner notes.

13 & God

- Adam "Doseone" Drucker
- Jeffrey "Jel" Logan
- Dax Pierson
- Jordan Dalrymple
- Markus Acher
- Micha Acher
- Martin Gretschmann

Additional musicians

- Jorg Widmoser – violin
- Andreas Horicht – viola
- Mathias Gotz – trombone
- Ivica Vucelic – Saba FBW3
- Stefan Schreiber – saxophone, bass clarinet

Technical personnel

- Olli Zulch – recording, mixing, additional production
- Jay Pellicci – recording
- Adam "Doseone" Drucker – artwork
- Stefan Garanin – cover skeleton

== Charts ==
Chart	Peak position
German Albums (Offizielle Top 100)	96
