= Be Evil =

Live album by Doseone
- Released: 2009
- Genre: Freestyle rap
- Length: 38:54

Doseone chronology
Skeleton Repellent (2007)	Be Evil (2009)

Be Evil is a collection of freestyle tracks and battles by American indie hip-hop artist Doseone. It was released in 2009. Many of the tracks on the album were live recordings from Doseone and Jel's freestyle school, "freestyleclass".

Limited copies of the album were sold on Themselves' 2009 tour.

== Track listing ==
1. "Unpredictable Still"
2. "Def to Death"
3. "Go Beastish (Vs. LEV)"
4. "Stabbed by Kittens (Vs. Zano, Glympse Automatik and Reed Richards)"
5. "Do Your Hair"
6. "Oh That's Wow (Vs. Bisque and Broke MC)"
7. "Pocket Pussy + Fake Chain"
8. "Prisonphonefree"
9. "End of Class"
10. "96 97 98"
