= The No Music =

Studio album by Themselves
- Released: September 16, 2002
- Recorded: 2001–2002
- Genre: Alternative hip-hop
- Length: 46:02
- Label: Anticon
- Producers: Jel, Doseone

Themselves chronology
Them (1999)	The No Music (2002)	The No Music of AIFFs (2003)

Professional ratings
Review scores
Source	Rating
AllMusic	2.5/5 stars
Dusted Magazine	favorable
Exclaim!	unfavorable
Mute	favorable
Pitchfork	4.5/10
RapReviews.com	5/10
SF Weekly	favorable
Stylus Magazine	B+
Tiny Mix Tapes	4/5 marks

The No Music (stylized as The No Music.) is the second studio album by American hip-hop duo Themselves. It was released on Anticon in 2002. It peaked at number 183 on the CMJ Radio 200 chart, as well as number 13 on CMJ's Hip-Hop chart. A remix version of the album, The No Music of AIFFs, was released in 2003.

== Critical reception ==
Ed Howard of Stylus Magazine gave the album a grade of B+, saying, "It's far from perfect, and there are still moments where the experiments fall short, but overall this represents the fulfillment of the substantial promise made by Circle and cLOUDDEAD". Daniel Thomas-Glass of Dusted Magazine called it "a masterful piece of work".

Meanwhile, Thomas Quinlan of Exclaim! said, "it turns out to be another Anticon disappointment, although it's still better than the last few". Sam Chennault of Pitchfork gave the album a 4.5 out of 10, saying, "It's a horribly pointless and boring album that will only satisfy those who equate progress with soulless beats and abstract mic theatrics."

Neil Strauss of The New York Times placed the album at number 9 on his year-end list.

== Track listing ==
No.	Title	Length
1.	"Home Work"	2:38
2.	"Mouthful"	4:07
3.	"Good People Check"	3:51
4.	"Poison Pit"	4:02
5.	"Live Trap"	3:31
6.	"Only Child Explosion"	2:30
7.	"Paging Dr. Moon or Gun"	3:42
8.	"Dark Sky Demo"	3:56
9.	"You Devil You"	4:05
10.	"Out in the Open"	5:23
11.	"Hat in the Wind"	5:11

== Personnel ==
Credits adapted from liner notes.

Themselves

- Doseone – vocals, production
- Jel – vocals, production

Additional musicians

- Dax Pierson – keyboard bass (3, 11), electric piano (3), sampler (11)
- Alexander Kort – electric cello (5, 11)
- Alias – sampler (5)
- Why? – keyboard drums (6), keyboards (7), organ (7), drums (7), vocals (8)
- Alex Oropeza – final freak (7)
- Xopher D – final freak (7)
- Sole – vocals (8)
- John Herndon – drums (9, 11)
- Alexander Ito-Maitland – drums (10)

Technical personnel

- Alex Oropeza – mixing
- Xopher D – mixing, mastering
- Doseone – artwork
- Jel – artwork
- Odd Nosdam – layout, additional fingerprints
