= Ha (Doseone album) =

Studio album by Doseone
- Released: 2005
- Genre: Indie hip-hop
- Length: 37:19
- Producer: Doseone

Doseone chronology
The Pelt (2003)	Ha (2005)	Soft Skulls (2007)

Ha is the third solo album by American indie hip-hop artist Doseone. It was released in 2005. The album features contributions from Jel, Alias, Jordan Dalrymple and John Herndon.

== Track listing ==
1. "Ha" - 2:49
2. "The Tale of the Private Mind" - 3:27
3. "The Universe in 6 Jumps" - 4:48
4. "By Horoscope Light I&II" - 3:38
5. "Axejaw" - 3:38
6. "Lullaby #2418a" - 5:04
7. "Enter Ed's Head" - 2:40
8. "Wind Machine Lining" - 4:04
9. "Of Going" - 7:07
