= Resurgam (disambiguation) =

Resurgam is either of two submarines built in 1878 and 1879.

Resurgam may also refer to:

- Resurgam (album), a 2008 album by Alias
- Resurgam, a 2017 album by Fink
- Resurgam, a 1950 composition for brass band by Eric Ball
- "Resurgam", the motto of Portland, Maine, United States
- Resurgam, a fictional planet in Alastair Reynolds' novel Revelation Space
- Resurgam, a fictional hospital in the game Trauma Team from Atlus
- Resurgam, the Latin motto of the Nova Scotia Loyalists, "I shall rise again" - from a banner within the Public Archives of Canada, displayed in the book "Land of the Loyalists: Their Struggle to Shape the Maritimes", Ronald Rees, Nimbus Publishing Ltd., 2000.
