= Music for the Advancement of Hip Hop =

Compilation album by Anticon
- Released: 1999
- Genre: Hip-hop
- Length: 64:00
- Label: Anticon
- Producers: DJ Signify, DJ Mayonnaise, Jel, 6.2, Anomoly, Alias, Math, Mr. Skurge, Moodswing9

Anticon chronology
Music for the Advancement of Hip Hop (1999)	Giga Single (2001)

Professional ratings
Review scores
Source	Rating
AllMusic	4.5/5 stars
RapReviews.com	6/10

Music for the Advancement of Hip Hop is a compilation album released by American hip-hop record label Anticon in 1999. The album collects tracks by members of the label's core crew.

== Critical reception ==
Dan Gizzi of AllMusic gave the album 4.5 stars out of 5, saying, "if you want to hear some abstract hip hop from a variety of different artists this may be the album for you." Jon Caramanica of Spin called it "the Anticon collective's breakthrough release". Ian S. Port of SF Weekly said: "It featured left-field DJ textures, boom-bap beats, insanely acrobatic rapping, and stilted, stumbling rhythms."

In 2015, Fact placed it at number 100 on the "100 Best Indie Hip-Hop Records of All Time" list.

== Track listing ==
No.	Title	Artist(s)	Length
1.	"Propaganda (Intro)"	DJ Signify & DJ Mayonnaise	1:36
2.	"Rainmen"	Deep Puddle Dynamics	5:04
3.	"Untitled"	Buck 65	3:11
4.	"Interlude #1"	DJ Signify & DJ Mayonnaise	1:50
5.	"Savior?"	Slug, Eyedea & Sole	5:54
6.	"It's Them"	Them	5:57
7.	"Interlude #2"	DJ Signify & DJ Mayonnaise	0:41
8.	"Divine Disappointment"	Alias	4:02
9.	"Meditations"	DJ Signify	3:37
10.	"Human Races the Tortoise"	Sole & Dose	5:25
11.	"My Little Habit"	Mr. Skurge	2:22
12.	"Nothing but Sunshine"	Slug	4:53
13.	"Interlude #3"	DJ Signify & DJ Mayonnaise	0:55
14.	"Martyr Theme Song"	Sole & Moodswing9	4:42
15.	"Simulated Snow"	6.2	3:34
16.	"Interlude #4"	DJ Signify & DJ Mayonnaise	0:58
17.	"Holy Shit!"	Buck 65, Sole, Circus, 6.2 & Cosmic Lovefuck	6:14
18.	"Bright Moments"	The Pedestrian	3:05
