= Ten seconds =

Ten seconds may refer to:

== Film and television ==
- 10 Seconds (game show), a television game show that aired on The Nashville Network from March 29, 1993 to March 25, 1994.
- 10 Seconds (film), a 2008 German film

== Music ==
- 10 Seconds (album), a 2002 album by Jel
- "10 Seconds" (song), a 2010 song by Jazmine Sullivan
- "Ten Seconds", a song by Ane Brun from the 2008 album Changing of the Seasons
- "Ten Seconds", a song by BLAZE from the 2004 album Blood & Belief
- Ten Seconds was a progressive rock band that put out an album on Discipline Global Mobile records in 1996

== Sports ==
- ten-second runoff, a type of penalty in gridiron football
- The 10-second barrier in the sport of athletics

Ten-second rule or 10-second rule may refer to:

- an American football rule whereby the remaining game time may be reduced by ten seconds if a team is considered to have intentionally delayed the game
- a basketball rule in some leagues whereby the offense has ten seconds (eight seconds under international rules) to advance the ball to their forecourt
- a variation of the Five-second rule, whereby food fallen to the floor for less than five seconds may be considered by some to be safe to eat
