= The Free Houdini =

Mixtape by Themselves
- Released: March 25, 2009
- Genre: Alternative hip-hop
- Length: 54:42
- Label: Anticon
- Producers: Jel, Doseone

Themselves chronology
| The No Music of AIFFs (2003) | The Free Houdini (2009) | Crowns Down (2009) |

Professional ratings
Aggregate scores
| Source | Rating |
|---|---|
| Metacritic | 74/100 |
Review scores
| Source | Rating |
| Christgau's Consumer Guide | (2-star Honorable Mention) |
| Cokemachineglow | favorable |
| Exclaim! | favorable |
| HipHopDX | 3.0/5 |
| Pitchfork | 6.6/10 |
| PopMatters | 8/10 stars |
| RapReviews.com | 7.5/10 |

The Free Houdini (styled as theFREEhoudini) is a 2009 mixtape by American hip-hop duo Themselves.

It is a return after a six-year hiatus that saw the members, Jel and Doseone, spend the majority of their time on their other band Subtle. It was made available for 90 days as a one-track MP3 for download from the Anticon website, later released in a deluxe CD package.

== Critical reception ==
At Metacritic, which assigns a weighted average score out of 100 to reviews from mainstream critics, the mixtape received an average score of 74% based on 6 reviews, indicating "generally favorable reviews".

Jer Fairall of PopMatters gave the mixtape 8 stars out of 10, saying, "Here, Doseone is once again utilizing his skills as a performer to propel the music forward, and the result is a record that is actually thrilling and fun to listen to, rather than simply 'interesting'." Jayson Greene of Pitchfork gave the mixtape a 6.6 out of 10 and called it "another step in Anticon's breathless, never-ending push forward."

== Track listing ==
| No. | Title | Length |
|---|---|---|
| 1. | "Pay That Piper" | 2:13 |
| 2. | "Oversleeping" | 1:53 |
| 3. | "Know That to Know This" (featuring Aesop Rock) | 3:21 |
| 4. | "Kick the Ball" (featuring Buck 65) | 2:57 |
| 5. | "1 for No Money" (featuring Sole) | 1:07 |
| 6. | "Rappers Is Interns (Freestyle)" | 1:12 |
| 7. | "Party Rap Sucks" (featuring Busdriver) | 1:24 |
| 8. | "Long Time Coming" (featuring Lionesque) | 3:51 |
| 9. | "Swarm of Bee II" | 2:44 |
| 10. | "Back 2 Burn" (featuring Pedestrian) | 1:48 |
| 11. | "The Mark" (featuring D-Styles) | 3:01 |
| 12. | "Keys to Ignition" (featuring Serengeti) | 3:13 |
| 13. | "Roman Is As Roman Does" | 1:56 |
| 14. | "The Medicine" (featuring Slug) | 3:03 |
| 15. | "Free & Void" | 2:00 |
| 16. | "Rapping 4 Money" (featuring Clouddead) | 3:56 |
| 17. | "Rappers Is Modelships (Freestyle)" (featuring DJ Baku) | 1:54 |
| 18. | "Puzzled" (featuring Passage and DJ Andrew) | 3:17 |
| 19. | "Cross-section of Wreckage" (featuring Alias and DJ Andrew) | 2:56 |
| 20. | "Each Ant in Their House" | 7:05 |
