= Soft money (disambiguation) =

Soft money is a lightly regulated form of financing campaigns, used in financing electoral campaigns in the United States.

Soft money also may refer to:

- Economics:
  - Soft currency, a currency which is expected to fluctuate erratically or depreciate relative to other currencies
  - Fiat money
- Titled works:
  - Soft Money (film), a 1919 film
  - Soft Money (album), a 2006 album by Jel
