= The Pelt =

Studio album by Doseone
- Released: 2003
- Genre: Spoken word
- Length: 46:20

Doseone chronology
| Slowdeath (1999) | The Pelt (2003) | Ha (2005) |

Professional ratings
Review scores
| Source | Rating |
|---|---|
| Pitchfork | 7.8 |

The Pelt is the first poetry book/CD by American indie hip-hop artist Doseone. It was released in 2003. The CD contains excerpts of the book read aloud by Doseone, in a style similar to the one heard on his previous album Slowdeath.

== Track listing ==
1. The Pelt (0:30)
2. The Unraveling Arm Of An Emotional Boy (4:53)
3. Earth To Rachel, Navels And Notes (6:53)
4. The Following Section Has Been Omitted (0:06)
5. Windows And Women... (4:00)
6. ...Oh And Whales Too (1:01)
7. The Following Section Has Been Omitted (0:27)
8. Of B-Dreams And Medium Pieces (28:26)
