= Slowdeath =

Studio album by Doseone
- Released: 1999
- Genres: Indie hip-hop, spoken word
- Length: 59:24

Doseone chronology
Hemispheres (1998)	Slowdeath (1999)	The Pelt (2003)

Slowdeath is an album by American indie hip-hop artist Doseone. It was released in 1999. The album consists of two extended tracks.

The album features contributions from Doseone's bandmates in the group Clouddead; Odd Nosdam providing additional sounds and Why? providing the cover art.

== Track listing ==
1. Untitled (30:53)
2. Untitled (28:31)
