= Crowns Down =

Studio album by Themselves
- Released: October 20, 2009
- Genre: Alternative hip-hop
- Length: 40:28
- Label: Anticon
- Producers: Jel, Doseone

Themselves chronology
The Free Houdini (2009)	Crowns Down (2009)	Crowns Down & Company (2010)

Professional ratings
Aggregate scores
Source	Rating
Metacritic	72/100
Review scores
Source	Rating
AllMusic	3/5 stars
BBC Music	favorable
Christgau's Consumer Guide	(2-star Honorable Mention)
Drowned in Sound	8/10
Exclaim!	favorable
Pitchfork	6.7/10
The Skinny	4/5 stars
Spectrum Culture	3.5/5
Tiny Mix Tapes	3.5/5 marks
XLR8R	8/10

Crowns Down (stylized as CrownsDown) is the third studio album by American hip-hop duo Themselves. It was released on Anticon in 2009. A remix version of the album, Crowns Down & Company, was released in 2010.

== Critical reception ==
At Metacritic, which assigns a weighted average score out of 100 to reviews from mainstream critics, the album received an average score of 72% based on 7 reviews, indicating "generally favorable reviews".

Brian Howe of Pitchfork gave the album a 6.7 out of 10 and described it as "a back-to-basics album from a group who probably needs one, having ventured so far afield." Thomas Quinlan of Exclaim! said, "Themselves may not have snatched the crown but they've certainly thrown down the gauntlet with CrownsDown, their confident and comfortable return to the royal rap court."

BBC Music named it one of the best albums of 2009.

== Track listing ==
All tracks are written by Doseone and Jel, except "Back II Burn" by Doseone, Jel, and Pedestrian.

No.	Title	Length
1.	"Back II Burn"	4:06
2.	"Oversleeping"	3:15
3.	"The Mark"	4:54
4.	"Gangster of Disbelief"	3:50
5.	"Daxstrong"	3:37
6.	"You Ain't It"	3:48
7.	"Roman Is As Roman Does"	4:00
8.	"Skinning the Drum"	3:34
9.	"Deadcatclear II"	5:30
10.	"Gold Teeth Will Roll"	4:00

== Personnel ==
Credits adapted from liner notes.

Themselves

- Doseone – vocals, production
- Jel – vocals, production

Additional musicians

- D-Styles – turntables (3)
- Jordan Dalrymple – vocals (5)
- Markus Acher – vocals (5)
- Dax Pierson – vocals (6)

Technical personnel

- Odd Nosdam – mixing
- Yoni Wolf – mixing
- Mike Wells – mastering
- Doseone – photography
- Matthew Scott – photography
- K Photo – photography
