= Eyes Closed =

Eyes Closed may refer to:

- "Eyes Closed" (Ed Sheeran song), a 2023 song by Ed Sheeran
- "Eyes Closed" (Halsey song), a 2017 song by Halsey
- "Eyes Closed" (Imagine Dragons song), a 2024 song by Imagine Dragons
- "Eyes Closed" (Jisoo and Zayn song), a 2025 song by Jisoo and Zayn
- Eyes Closed EP, a 2003 EP by Alias, or the title song
- "Eyes Closed", a song by In Real Life
- "Eyes Closed", a song by Florida Georgia Line from Life Rolls On, 2021
- "Eyez Closed", a song by Snoop Dogg featuring John Legend and Kanye West, from the 2011 album Doggumentary
- "Eyes Closed" (Suspects), a 2014 television episode
