= Exploding Views =

Studio album by SJ Esau
- Released: 3 March 2014
- Genre: Indie rock; experimental pop
- Length: 48:15
- Label: FromSCRATCH Records
- Producer: Sam Wisternoff

SJ Esau chronology
Small Vessel (2008)	Exploding Views (2014)

Exploding Views is the third studio album by British indie rock musician SJ Esau. It was released on FromSCRATCH Records in 2014 on vinyl, CD, and digital format. "The Pull" features contributions from Doseone and Charlotte Nicholls. A DVD release of the album containing videos for each track has been announced for late 2014.

== Critical reception ==
Professional ratings
Review scores
Source	Rating
Louder Than War	favorable
Vice	favorable

Phillip Allen of Louder Than War wrote, "this album will widen SJ Esau's audience and hopefully put him on the map next to fellow Bristol independent artists such as Olo Worms and Oliver Wilde and the truly inspiring homegrown talent that makes the place special." He called the album "a triumph of the independent spirit that the city of Bristol produces so much of."

== Track listing ==
All tracks are written by Sam Wisternoff.

No.	Title	Length
1.	"Soul II Skull"	3:06
2.	"Stubborn Step"	4:10
3.	"Forceps"	3:32
4.	"Who Isn't?"	5:03
5.	"Why Angry?"	4:54
6.	"The Pull"	4:51
7.	"Make Space"	4:22
8.	"Perspective Parade"	2:42
9.	"Remotely"	6:18
10.	"What Is It Now?"	3:24
11.	"No Journey"	5:57
Total length:		48:15
