= Pitch Black Prism =

Studio album by Alias
- Released: June 24, 2014
- Studios: The Resurgam Compound, South Portland, Maine
- Genre: Instrumental hip-hop
- Length: 41:31
- Label: Anticon
- Producer: Alias

Alias chronology
Fever Dream (2011)	Pitch Black Prism (2014)

Professional ratings
Review scores
Source	Rating
AllMusic	4/5 stars
Exclaim!	8/10
The Skinny	3/5 stars

Pitch Black Prism is the final solo studio album by American hip-hop musician Alias. It was released on Anticon in 2014. The album was preceded by the free EP Indiiggo.

== Critical reception ==
David Jeffries of AllMusic gave the album 4 stars out of 5, saying: "Wherever this one fits genre-wise, Alias has figured out how to employ the drift, the sway, and the compressed boom of his early work into other styles of music." He added: "With his study of moods running parallel, the results keep getting better." Rebecca M. Williams of Exclaim! gave the album an 8 out of 10, saying: "Fever Dream gave us a glimpse of his experimental potential three years ago, and he has followed further down the path of exploration with Pitch Black Prism."

== Track listing ==
No.	Title	Length
1.	"Ghost Cloudz"	4:40
2.	"Crimson Across It" (featuring Doseone)	2:40
3.	"Vermillion Coda"	0:41
4.	"Amber Revisions"	4:32
5.	"Gold Clouddead Skiez"	3:48
6.	"Joseph Greenleaf Mornings"	4:15
7.	"Pistachio Payoff"	1:33
8.	"Vallejo's Sapphire Views"	3:00
9.	"Indiiggo" (featuring Therese Workman)	3:39
10.	"Amethyst Afternoon"	3:43
11.	"Pitch Black Prism"	3:36
12.	"Slackened Onyx"	0:41
13.	"Aikotune"	4:17

== Personnel ==
Credits adapted from liner notes.

- Alias – production, arrangement, recording, mixing
- Doseone – lyrics (2), vocals (2)
- Therese Workman – lyrics (9), vocals (9), additional synthesizer (9)
- Daddy Kev – mastering
- Jesse Moretti – cover art, design, layout
