= Collected Remixes =

Compilation album by Alias
- Released: May 8, 2007
- Genre: Alternative hip-hop
- Length: 55:18
- Label: Anticon
- Producer: Alias

Alias chronology
Muted (2003)	Collected Remixes (2007)	Resurgam (2008)

Professional ratings
Review scores
Source	Rating
CMJ New Music Monthly	favorable
Dusted Magazine	mixed
Pitchfork	5.5/10
PopMatters	6/10 stars
XLR8R	favorable

Collected Remixes is a compilation album of remixes by American hip-hopian Alias. It was released on Anticon in 2007.

== Critical reception ==
David Ma of XLR8R said: "Needless to say, Alias adapts seamlessly to the diverse cast and packs power into the disc's 11 tracks." Brian Howe of Pitchfork gave the album a 5.5 out of 10, saying: "Any of these on their own might impress, but collected together, they blur into anonymity, lacking the diversity or the nuance necessary to uphold the weight of the album format." Mark Schiller of PopMatters gave the album 6 stars out of 10, saying: "As long as you're not looking for innovation at every turn, Alias can punctuate a beautiful moment like few others."

== Track listing ==
No.	Title	Length
1.	"What You Gave Away" (Remix for The One AM Radio)	4:48
2.	"Into the Trees" (Remix for 13 & God)	4:00
3.	"Exodus Damage" (Remxi for John Vanderslice)	4:58
4.	"Marsh of Epidemics" (Remix for Christ.)	6:14
5.	"Remix for Alienation" (Remix for Lali Puna)	4:32
6.	"Clue" (Remix for Lunz)	5:08
7.	"Stay Awake" (Remix for Boy in Static)	4:20
8.	"Crush" (Remix for Lucky Pierre)	4:52
9.	"Given Ground" (Remix for Giardini Di Miro)	4:24
10.	"Karmic Retribution/Funny Sticks" (Remix for Sixtoo)	6:46
11.	"9:24 Cigarette (Version 2)" (by Alias & Tarsier)	5:16

== Personnel ==
Credits adapted from liner notes.

- Alias – remix
- Jeremy Goody – mastering
- Baillie Parker – executive production
- Sam Flax Keener – design, layout
- Matt McCullough – photography
