= 10 Seconds (album) =

Studio album by Jel
- Released: October 22, 2002
- Genre: Instrumental hip hop
- Length: 56:59
- Label: Mush Records
- Producer: Jel

Jel chronology
10 Seconds (2002)	Soft Money (2006)

Professional ratings
Review scores
Source	Rating
AllMusic	4/5 stars
CMJ New Music Report	favorable
Dusted Magazine	favorable
Exclaim!	favorable
Pitchfork	6.9/10
Splendid Magazine	favorable
Stylus Magazine	C−

10 Seconds is the first studio album by American hip hop producer Jel. It was released on Mush Records on October 22, 2002. The title derives from the limited sampling time of E-mu SP-1200.

== Critical reception ==
Martin Woodside of AllMusic gave the album 4 stars out of 5, saying: "Built from pieces, albeit very small pieces, of other people's music, Jel has created an energetic, expansive sound that is all his own." He added: "Moody and atmospheric, this varied mix is remarkably cohesive."

Brad Haywood of Pitchfork gave the album a 6.9 out of 10, saying: "Although 10 Seconds doesn't break much new ground, it is a good disc, true to Jel's concept and very listenable." Lisa Hageman of CMJ New Music Report called it "an impressive compilation of a beat-maker whose close attention to detail is definitely paying off."

Writing for Pitchfork, Keith Fullerton Whitman said: "This record encapsulates the sort of subtle melancholy all but missing in contemporary productions."

== Track listing ==
No.	Title	Length
1.	"11. Multi Pitch"	2:33
2.	"12. Multi Level"	3:38
3.	"13. Exit Multi Mode"	3:38
4.	"14. Dynamic Button" (featuring Dax Pierson and Odd Nosdam)	5:24
5.	"Close.."	0:51
6.	"15. Define Mix"	2:23
7.	"16. Select Mix" (featuring Doseone)	1:08
8.	"17. Channel Assign"	4:10
9.	"18. Decay/Tune Select"	0:59
10.	"Forget It"	1:37
11.	"European4"	0:38
12.	"..Your.."	1:31
13.	"Changing Patterns"	0:48
14.	"19. Loop/Truncate"	2:51
15.	"20. Delete Sound"	2:08
16.	"21. 1st Song/Step"	0:52
17.	"22. Midi Parameters"	2:13
18.	"23. Special"	2:38
19.	"..Ears."	4:35
20.	"Tip Unfiltered"	1:26
21.	"Time Signature"	3:42
22.	"Subsong" (featuring Alias)	6:04
23.	"Auto Correct"	1:23
