= Learning to Walk =

Learning to walk is covered at gross motor skill.

Learning to Walk may refer to:

- Learning to Walk (Boo Radleys album), a 1992 compilation album by the British indie band The Boo Radleys
- Learning to Walk (Sole album), a 2002 compilation album by American hip hop artist Sole
