= Dax Pierson =

American musician (1970–2024)

- Born: Dax Wentworth Pierson; August 2, 1970
- Origin: Oakland, California, U.S.
- Died: December 30, 2024 (aged 54) Oakland, California, U.S.
- Genres: Experimental
- Occupation: Multi-instrumentalist
- Years active: 2000–2023
- Labels: Nosordo; Ratskin

Dax Wentworth Pierson (August 2, 1970 – December 30, 2024) was an American musician from Oakland, California. He had been a member of Subtle and 13 & God.

== Life and career ==
Pierson was born on August 2, 1970. He worked at Amoeba Music in Berkeley, California for 10 years. He was a member of Subtle and 13 & God.

In 2005, he was seriously injured and left paralyzed from the chest down when the Subtle tour van hit a patch of black ice in Iowa. No one else in the vehicle was seriously injured. His musician friends and promoters subsequently organized a series of tribute shows and benefit albums.

In 2009, he sued Ford Motor Company for faulty design mechanics, arguing that the defective seat contributed to his life-threatening injuries. A federal court jury awarded him $18.3 million ($12.3 million for medical expenses and lost earnings and $6 million for pain and suffering).

He released Live in Oakland on Ratskin Records in 2019.

In 2021, he released Nerve Bumps (A Queer Divine Dissatisfaction); his first solo studio album for fifteen years. The album's title partly inspired by a quote from dancer Martha Graham. Some of the album's themes touch on his recovery from his 2005 accident. The album's track For The Angels was included on The Wire magazine's compilation for April 2021.

Pierson died in Oakland, California on December 30, 2024, at the age of 54.

== Discography ==
=== Studio albums ===
- Intro To (2002)
- Pablo Feldman Sun Riley (2006) (with Robert Horton)
- Nerve Bumps (A Queer Divine Dissatisfaction) (Ratskin Records, 2021)

=== Live albums ===
- Live in Oakland (2019)

=== Contributions ===
- Conglomerate - "Armeghetto" (1996)
- Conglomerate - "Babylon EP" (1996)
- Anticon - "Pitty Party People" from We Ain't Fessin' (Double Quotes) (2002)
- Jel - "14. Dynamic Button" from 10 Seconds (2002)
- Themselves - "Good People Check" and "Hat in the Wind" from The No Music (2002)
- Odd Nosdam - "Untitled" from No More Wig for Ohio (2003)
- Alias - "Unseen Sights" from Muted (2003)
- Odd Nosdam - "Untitled Two" from Burner (2005)
- Alias & Tarsier - "Picking the Same Lock" from Brookland/Oaklyn (2006)
- Odd Nosdam - "Hollow Me" from Pretty Swell Explode (2008)
- Themselves - "You Ain't It" from Crowns Down (2009)
- Alias - "Talk in Technicolor" from Fever Dream (2011)
