= Fires in Distant Buildings =

Studio album by Gravenhurst
- Released: October 25, 2005
- Genre: Shoegazing
- Length: 52:24
- Label: Warp Records
- Producer: Nick Talbot

Gravenhurst chronology
Black Holes in the Sand (2004)	Fires in Distant Buildings (2005)	The Western Lands (2007)

Professional ratings
Review scores
Source	Rating
AllMusic	4/5 stars
Pitchfork Media	7.1/10

Fires in Distant Buildings is an album by the British singer-songwriter Gravenhurst, released in 2005.

== Critical reception ==
Spin thought that "all too often ... the album fades into the background for long, dull stretches." The Times wrote that "sprawling structures and Low/Nick Drake/Velvets template are stretched to the point where songs—as opposed to what have, in the past, seemed like extemporisations—begin to reveal their compact shapes."

AllMusic wrote that "Gravenhurst flesh out their starkly lovely fusion of British folk, dream pop, and electronica with full-fledged drums, electric guitars, and even denser electronic atmospheres."

== Track listing ==
1. "Down River"
2. "The Velvet Cell"
3. "Animals"
4. "Nicole"
5. "The Velvet Cell Reprise"
6. "Cities Beneath the Sea"
7. "Song From Under the Arches"
8. "See My Friends"
