= Flashlight Seasons =

Studio album by Gravenhurst
- Released: 2003
- Genre: Shoegazing
- Length: 43:26
- Label: Sink and Stove Records, re-released on LP/CD worldwide by Warp Records

Gravenhurst chronology
Internal Travels (2002)	Flashlight Seasons (2003)	Black Holes in the Sand (2004)

Professional ratings
Review scores
Source	Rating
Allmusic	link
Pitchfork Media	(7.1/10) link

Flashlight Seasons is the second album by the British singer-songwriter Gravenhurst. Originally released on a trio of labels - Red Square in the USA, Sink & Stove and Silent Age Records in the UK - it was re-released with new sleeve artwork and packaging worldwide on Warp Records in 2004.

== Track listing ==
1. "Tunnels" - 4:44
2. "Fog Round the Figurehead" - 4:40
3. "I Turn My Face to the Forest Floor" - 3:52
4. "Bluebeard" - 4:26
5. "The Diver" - 5:29
6. "East of the City" - 2:36
7. "Damage" - 4:23
8. "Damage II" - 3:05
9. "The Ice Tree" - 5:29
10. "Hopechapel Hill" - 4:42
