= Saroos =

German post-rock musical trio

- Origin: Berlin, Germany
- Genres: Post-rock, electronica
- Years active: 2006–present
- Labels: Anticon, Alien Transistor
- Members: Florian Zimmer; Christoph Brandner; Max Punktezahl
- Website: saroos.bandcamp.com

Saroos is a post-rock trio from Berlin, Germany. It consists of Florian Zimmer, Christoph Brandner and Max Punktezahl.

== History ==
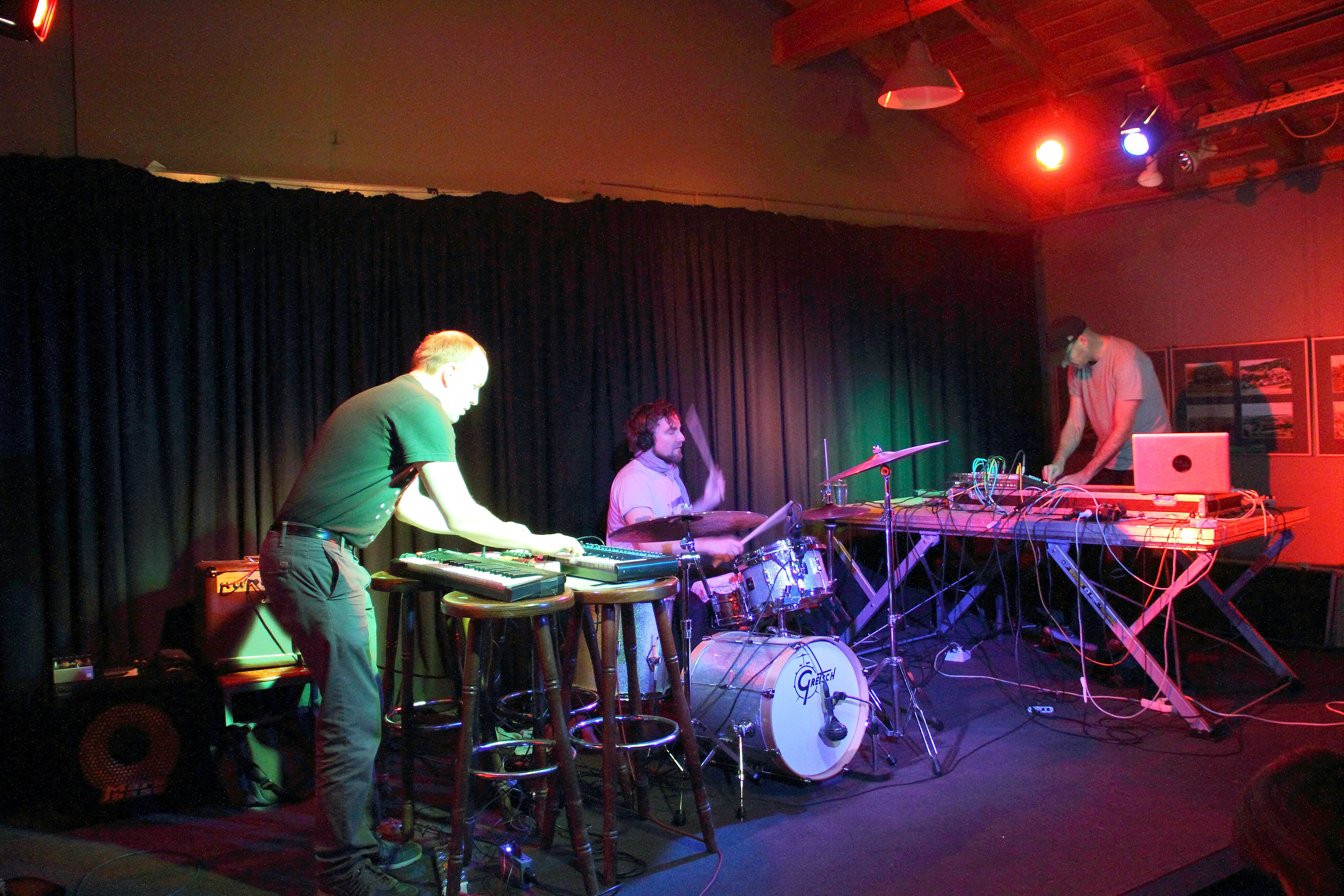
Saroos at Club W71, 2017

Saroos released the self-titled debut album, Saroos, on Alien Transistor in 2006.

The second album, See Me Not, was released on Anticon in the United States and on Alien Transistor elsewhere in 2010. It was produced by Odd Nosdam. The band toured Europe in promotion of the album.

Saroos released the single "Yukoma (Populous Remix)" b/w "Outrigger (feat. Jel)" on Alien Transistor in 2011. The band also toured Europe with 13 & God in the same year.

== Discography ==
=== Albums ===
- Saroos (2006)
- See Me Not (2010)
- Return (2013)
- Tardis (2016)
- OLU (2020)
- Turtle Roll (2023)

=== Singles ===
- "Yukoma (Populous Remix)" b/w "Outrigger (feat. Jel)" (2011)
- "Frequency Change feat. Sequoyah Tiger" (2021)
- "Tin & Glass feat. Ronald Lippok" (2021)
