= The Meat & Oil EP =

EP by Jel
- Released: September 17, 2002
- Genre: Instrumental hip hop
- Length: 20:49
- Label: Mush Records
- Producer: Jel

Professional ratings
Review scores
Source	Rating
Gullbuy	favorable
Hip Hop Core	2.5/5 stars

The Meat & Oil EP is a studio EP by American hip hop producer Jel. It was released on Mush Records in 2002.

== Track listing ==
No.	Title	Length
1.	"Media Mom Saves the Day"	5:55
2.	"Shed Those McValues"	4:34
3.	"The Livestock Rock"	4:59
4.	"Petroleum Jel"	5:23
