= The Other Side of the Looking Glass =

Studio album by Alias
- Released: May 20, 2002
- Genre: Hip-hop
- Length: 59:55
- Label: Anticon
- Producers: Alias, DJ Mayonnaise

Alias chronology
The Other Side of the Looking Glass (2002)	Muted (2003)

Singles from The Other Side of the Looking Glass
- 1. "Final Act" Released: 2001

Professional ratings
Review scores
Source	Rating
AllMusic	4.5/5 stars
Dusted Magazine	favorable
Stylus Magazine	C+

The Other Side of the Looking Glass is the debut solo studio album by American hip-hop musician Alias. It was released on Anticon in 2002. It features a guest appearance from Doseone.

== Critical reception ==
Stanton Swihart of AllMusic gave the album 4.5 stars out of 5, saying: "There is a jittery, kinetic, midnight vitality to both the sound and sentiment expressed on this solo debut, yet Alias has an almost disarmingly serene way of wading through the mazes of his mind."

== Track listing ==
No.	Title	Length
1.	"Begin"	3:03
2.	"Jovial Costume"	5:07
3.	"Angel of Solitude"	3:47
4.	"Dying to Stay"	5:10
5.	"Getting By (Version 2)"	4:45
6.	"Arrival"	4:17
7.	"Watching Water"	4:05
8.	"Opus Ashamed" (featuring Doseone)	4:57
9.	"Black Tea"	5:37
10.	"Inspirations Passing"	5:50
11.	"Pill Hiding"	3:47
12.	"Slow Motion People"	4:56
13.	"Final Act"	4:36

== Personnel ==
Credits adapted from liner notes.

- Alias – vocals, production, arrangement, recording, mixing
- Doseone – vocals (8)
- Ehren Whitney – saxophone (10)
- DJ Mayonnaise – production (10)
- Caleb Mulkerin – recording (10), mixing (10)
- Jonathan Wyman – mastering
- Thesis – artwork
