= SJ Esau =

- Born: Sam Wisternoff; Bristol, England
- Genres: Indie rock, experimental pop
- Occupations: Singer, producer
- Years active: 1999–present
- Labels: fromSCRATCHrecords; Anticon; Twisted Nerve Records; Enormous Corpse
- Website: www.sjesau.co.uk

SJ Esau is the music project of Sam Wisternoff, an experimental pop musician from Bristol, England. Although ostensibly a solo project, Wisternoff is often joined by the drummer Sean Talbot and has incorporated a variety of other musicians into recording projects and live performances.

== History and work ==
Wisternoff's music career began in the late 1980s as a prepubescent rapper, collaborating with his brother, Jody Wisternoff to release a single on Smith & Mighty’s Three Stripe Records. Spending his later teenage years in indie rock band, The Pudding, Wisternoff released the first SJ Esau album, Queezy Beliefs, in 1999 on his Enormous Corpse label which was followed by various CDR albums and limited edition releases for labels such as Static Caravan Recordings, Twisted Nerve Records and Fooltribe.

In 2007, Anticon Records re-released the album Wrong Faced Cat Feed Collapse. The next album, Small Vessel, was released by Anticon in 2008.

In the following years, Wisternoff released various SJ Esau EPs as well as taking part in a variety of collaborative projects such as Jeremy Smoking Jacket with Rose Kemp and Hesomagari with Yoshino Shigihara from the band, Zun Zun Egui. In 2010, Wisternoff started a music video production and audio mastering company entitled Ill Spectre Productions, producing music videos for bands such as Gravenhurst, Thought Forms and Get the Blessing.

In 2014, fromSCRATCHrecords released the album, Exploding Views.

== Discography ==
=== Albums ===
- Queezy Beliefs (1999)
- Queezy Epiphany Coming Through The Wall (2003)
- Wrong Faced Cat Feed Collapse (2007)
- Small Vessel (2008)
- Exploding Views (2014)

=== EPs ===
- Photocopy of my Face Sellotaped To Adrian's Face (2004)
- Live in Doors (2005)
- 5 Track EP (2006)
- The Gist (2009)
- Internal Workings (2011)

=== Miscellaneous ===
- V/A vs SJ Esau – Stop Touching My Cat – Remix Collection (2005)
- Under Certain Things / Aerial Split 7" w/ Bronnt Industries Kapital (2006)
- Twocsinak & SJ Esau Are A Pair Of Pussies / SJ Esau & Twocsinak Are Feline Groovy Split w/ Twocsinak (2006)
- V/A vs SJ Esau – More Touching – Remix Collection (2008)
- Once Inch Badge Split 7" w/ Half-handed Cloud, Suburban Kids With Biblical Names & Kopek (2009)
- Sellotape Epiphany (2009)

=== Collaborations ===
- Onanist Homework Robot & The Guano Ignoramus – Large Ghost (2004)
- Jeremy Smoking Jacket – Now We Are Dead (And Other Stories) (2005)
- Hesomagari – Hanasu Shapes (2011)
