= The Ghost in Daylight =

Studio album by Gravenhurst
- Released: 30 April 2012
- Label: Warp Records

Gravenhurst chronology
The Western Lands (2007)	'''The Ghost in Daylight''' (2012)

Professional ratings
Aggregate scores
Source	Rating
Metacritic	70/100
Review scores
Source	Rating
AllMusic	4/5 stars
Consequence of Sound	2/5 stars
The Guardian	4/5 stars
NME	6/10
Pitchfork Media	6.2/10

The Ghost in Daylight is the fifth album by Gravenhurst, released on Warp Records.

== Track listing ==
1. "Circadian" - 4:11
2. "The Prize" - 6:38
3. "Fitzrovia" - 8:08
4. "In Miniature" - 4:32
5. "Carousel" - 1:28
6. "Islands" - 8:05
7. "The Foundry" - 4:22
8. "Peacock" - 2:44
9. "The Ghost of Saint Paul" - 6:02
10. "Three Fires" - 4:16

== Reception ==
The Guardian praised the album as "beautifully haunting". However, Pitchfork described it as "underplayed, and occasionally overly subtle".
