= Samurai Gunn =

2013 video game

- Logo
- Developer: Beau Blyth
- Publisher: Beau Blyth
- Composer: Doseone
- Engine: GameMaker: Studio
- Platforms: Microsoft Windows, OS X
- Release: Microsoft Windows; 10 December 2013; OS X 29 January 2015
- Genre: Action
- Mode: Multiplayer

Samurai Gunn is a 2D action video game developed by Beau Blyth and Doseone and originally published by Maxistentialism (though it is currently being self-published). The game was released for Microsoft Windows in 2013, OS X in 2015, and a planned PlayStation 4 and PlayStation Vita version were announced but never released. A sequel, Samurai Gunn 2, was released in early access via Steam on 20 July 2021, and is currently in development for Microsoft Windows, Nintendo Switch, and PlayStation 5.

== Gameplay ==
Samurai Gunn is a local multiplayer game that supports 2 to 4 players utilising melee and shooting mechanics as well as platforming.

Players are armed with a sword and gun with only three bullets per life. A match typically consists of players defeating each other with one hit with an attack with either their sword or a bullet. Both swords and bullets can be deflected by other players with precise timing.

== Development ==
Teknopants' Beau Blyth came up with the concept of Samurai Gunn while watching Tommy Wiseau's film The Room and in his boredom exclaimed to his friend Jake that he would make a game. His friend replied, "Samurais. With guns."

Development of the game started the same night, in which Blyth had a working prototype running with most of the basic features. The core game was produced within a week while the full game took half a year to develop.

== Reception ==
Reception

Aggregate score
Aggregator	Score
Metacritic	78/100

Review scores
Publication	Score
GameSpot	8/10
IGN	8.3/10

Samurai Gunn received positive reviews from most critics.
