= DJ Mayonnaise =

American alternative hip hop producer and DJ

- Born: Chris Greer
- Origin: Portland, Maine
- Genre: Instrumental hip-hop
- Occupations: Producer, DJ
- Instruments: Sampler, turntable, synthesizer
- Years active: 1999–present
- Labels: Anticon, Mush Records
- Website: djmayonnaise.com

Chris Greer, better known by his stage name DJ Mayonnaise, is an alternative hip-hop producer and DJ from Portland, Maine. He has released two albums on Anticon.

== History ==
DJ Mayonnaise released his debut album 55 Stories on Anticon in 1999.

From 1999 to 2003, he produced several tracks for underground hip-hop artists such as Deep Puddle Dynamics and Sage Francis.

He was also a member of So-Called Artists along with Sole and Alias. The trio released one album, Paint by Number Songs, on Mush Records in 2001.

DJ Mayonnaise's second solo album Still Alive was released on Anticon in 2007. "Strateegery," a track from the album, features rapper K-the-I???. Richard Foster of Incendiary Magazine praised Still Alive as "a great record. Highly recommended." ALARM Magazine listed the album on "In Rotation."

== Discography ==
Albums

- 55 Stories (Anticon, 1999)
- Paint by Number Songs (Mush Records, 2001) (with Alias & Sole, as So-Called Artists)
- Still Alive (Anticon, 2007)
- Waxfed (Grace Evelyn Recordings, 2023) (with Mat Young (RPM), as Waxfed)

Production credits

- Deep Puddle Dynamics - "Slight" from The Taste of Rain... Why Kneel? (1999)
- Deep Puddle Dynamics - "Exist" from The Taste of Rain... Why Kneel? (1999)
- Sole - "MC Howard Hughes" from Bottle of Humans (2000)
- Anticon - "We Ain't Fessin'" on Giga Single (2001)
- Anticon - "We Ain't Fessin' (Double Quotes)" from We Ain't Fessin' (Double Quotes) (2002)
- Sage Francis - "Inherited Scars" from Personal Journals (2002)
- Sage Francis - "Personal Journalist" from Personal Journals (2002)
- Alias - "Inspirations Passing" from The Other Side of the Looking Glass (2002)
- Bleubird - "Duct Tape Rubber Room" from Pilgrim of St. Zotique 12" (2006)
- Alias - "Dahorses" from Fever Dream (2011)
- Buck 65 - "Gates of Hell" from Neverlove (2014)

Compilation appearances

- "Propaganda (Intro)" "Interlude" on Music for the Advancement of Hip Hop (1999)
- "Go (Away and Think)" with Jel on Ropeladder 12 (2000)
- "Ode to the Modern Woman" on Giga Single (2001)
