= Hemispheres (Doseone album) =

Studio album by Doseone
- Released: 1998
- Genre: Indie hip-hop
- Length: 53:12
- Producers: Mr. Dibbs, Mr. Len, J. Rawls, Fat Jon, Jel, G-Fresh, Aktual Solar

Doseone chronology
| Hemispheres (1998) | Slowdeath (1999) |

Professional ratings
Review scores
| Source | Rating |
|---|---|
| AllMusic | 3.5/5 stars |

Hemispheres is the first solo album by American hip-hop artist Doseone, released in 1998.

== Track listing ==
| No. | Title | Producer(s) | Length |
|---|---|---|---|
| 1. | "Bronchial Cleansing" | Mr. Dibbs | 1:05 |
| 2. | "Civilization" | Mr. Len | 3:57 |
| 3. | "Spitfire" (featuring Lionesque) | J. Rawls | 5:39 |
| 4. | "Self Explanitory" | J. Rawls | 4:18 |
| 5. | "Voluntary Passive Euthanasia" | J. Rawls, Fat Jon | 4:42 |
| 6. | "2 Ton Can of Wupass" | Jel | 4:43 |
| 7. | "As for Bias" | G-Fresh | 4:34 |
| 8. | "That Ol' Pagan Shit" | J. Rawls | 5:25 |
| 9. | "Etherial Downtime" | Jel | 6:56 |
| 10. | "Neapolitan" | J. Rawls, Fat Jon, Aktual Solar | 5:23 |
| 11. | "Genres" (featuring Kris Brown) | J. Rawls | 6:30 |
