= The No Music of AIFFs =

Remix album by Themselves
- Released: September 22, 2003
- Genre: Alternative hip-hop
- Length: 49:42
- Label: Anticon
- Producers: Themselves, Matth, Controller 7, Hrvatski, Why?, Hood, Alias, Grapedope, Fog, Odd Nosdam, The Notwist, Electric Birds

Themselves chronology
| The No Music (2002) | The No Music of AIFFs (2003) | The Free Houdini (2009) |

Professional ratings
Review scores
| Source | Rating |
|---|---|
| PopMatters | favorable |

The No Music of AIFFs is a remix album by American hip-hop duo Themselves. It includes remixes of songs from the duo's second studio album The No Music. It was released on Anticon in 2003. It peaked at number 86 on the CMJ Radio 200 chart, as well as number 11 on CMJ's Hip-Hop chart.

== Critical reception ==
Tim Stelloh of PopMatters gave the album a favorable review, saying: "The originals, which might have plenty of great qualities, never sound quite the same." He commented that Themselves' vocalist Doseone is "essentially breaking all the genre rules and gnawing his form to shreds."

== Track listing ==
| No. | Title | Length |
|---|---|---|
| 1. | "Terror Fabulous" | 4:02 |
| 2. | "Hat Set for Butler (Themselves Demix)" | 2:41 |
| 3. | "Mouthful (Matth and Controller 7 Remix)" | 4:11 |
| 4. | "Good People Check (Hrvatski Remix)" | 5:02 |
| 5. | "Poison Pit (Why? Remix)" | 3:15 |
| 6. | "Livetrap (Hood Remix)" | 2:50 |
| 7. | "Only Child Explosion (Alias Remix)" | 2:55 |
| 8. | "Dr.Moonorgun Please (Grapedope Remix)" | 3:20 |
| 9. | "Darkskydemo (Fog Remix)" | 4:18 |
| 10. | "You Devil You (Odd Nosdam Remix)" | 4:20 |
| 11. | "Out in the Open (The Notwist Remix)" | 5:35 |
| 12. | "Hat in the Wind (Electric Birds Remix)" | 7:13 |
