= We Ain't Fessin' (Double Quotes) =

EP by Deep Puddle Dynamics / Anticon
- Released: February 25, 2002
- Recorded: 1999–2001
- Genre: Alternative hip-hop
- Length: 18:28
- Label: Anticon
- Producers: John Herndon, Jel, DJ Mayonnaise, Alias, Odd Nosdam, Sixtoo

Deep Puddle Dynamics chronology
The Taste of Rain... Why Kneel (1999)	We Ain't Fessin' (Double Quotes) (2002)

Professional ratings
Review scores
Source	Rating
AllMusic	2.5/5 stars
Dusted Magazine	favorable
Pitchfork	8.2/10

We Ain't Fessin' (Double Quotes) is an EP by Deep Puddle Dynamics and Anticon. It was released on Anticon on February 25, 2002.

The EP includes Deep Puddle Dynamics' "More from June" and Anticon's "We Ain't Fessin' (Double Quotes)". The CD version of the EP also includes another song by Anticon, titled "Pitty Party People".

== Critical reception ==
David M. Pecoraro of Pitchfork gave the EP an 8.2 out of 10, saying: "From a baseball stadium, to a political rally, to a game show, these eighteen minutes wander through more audio environments than most full-lengths." Sam Hunt of Dusted Magazine called it "[Anticon's] finest achievement".

== Track listing ==
No.	Title	Artist(s)	Length
1.	"More from June"	Deep Puddle Dynamics	5:56
2.	"We Ain't Fessin' (Double Quotes)"	Anticon	7:35
3.	"Pitty Party People"	Anticon	4:37

== Personnel ==
Credits adapted from liner notes.

- Sole – vocals (1, 2, 3)
- Doseone – vocals (1, 2, 3)
- Alias – vocals (1, 2, 3), production (2)
- Slug – vocals (1)
- Eyedea – vocals (1)
- John Herndon – production (1)
- DJ Mayonnaise – turntables (1), production (2)
- Passage – vocals (2)
- Why? – vocals (2)
- Pedestrian – vocals (2, 3)
- Jel – production (2, 3)
- Odd Nosdam – production (2)
- Sixtoo – production (3)
- Dax Pierson – keyboards (3)
