= Gravenhurst (band) =

British musical artist

- Origin: Bristol, England
- Genre: Alternative rock
- Years active: 1999–2014
- Label: Warp
- Past members: Nick Talbot; Dave Collingwood; Huw Cooksley; Robin Allender; Alex Wilkins; Claire Adams; Rachel Lancaster

Gravenhurst was the musical pseudonym of the English singer-songwriter, record producer, multi-instrumentalist and journalist Nicholas John Talbot (14 May 1977 – 2 December 2014). Talbot, from Bristol, England, signed to Warp Records. He died aged 37. His cause of death is undisclosed.

== History ==
While Talbot began performing solo, in 1999 additional musicians helped expand Gravenhurst into a live band, with drummer Dave Collingwood also contributing performance and production work to several recordings. From 2004 to 2006 Gravenhurst performed as a trio with Huw Cooksley on bass guitar. On tour throughout 2007 and 2008, Robin Allender played bass, and Alex Wilkins played guitar. The release of The Ghost in Daylight in 2012 saw the formation of a new three-piece Gravenhurst Ensemble, featuring Rachel Lancaster on vocals, bass guitar and keyboards, and Claire Adams on vocals and percussion. Talbot also performed solo with a guitar and phrase-sampling, looping and droning devices.

Gravenhurst is described as dark and atmospheric, veering between the noisy shoegazing sound of guitar bands such as My Bloody Valentine, the harmony-laden singer-songwriter territory of Simon and Garfunkel, and the intricate fingerpicking guitar styles of Bert Jansch and Nick Drake. Earlier releases were grounded in acoustic and folk styles, while Fires in Distant Buildings made moves towards psychedelic rock. Flying Saucer Attack, a Bristol outfit who released a series of feedback-drenched, folk-inspired albums in the early 1990s, were cited by Talbot as a major influence. He also expressed a love of synth-pop bands such as OMD, Heaven 17 and The Human League.

Notable features of Gravenhurst's musical style include Talbot's fragile voice and vocal harmonies, intricate guitar work and unsettling and mysterious lyrical themes.

Gravenhurst wrote and recorded original soundtrack music for the film Ein Freund von mir. As well as the bespoke "Song Among the Pine", the Gravenhurst songs "Animals", "The Velvet Cell" and "Song from Under the Arches" feature prominently in the film. An instrumental version of the song "Nicole" is featured in the Shane Meadows film This Is England. The song "Black Holes in the Sand" is featured at the end of the "Johnny B. Good" episode of "The Unit."

Talbot played guitar on "Changing of the Seasons" and "Borderline Personality" on the second War Against Sleep album, Invitation to the Feast.

== Silent Age Records ==
Talbot contributed to Guy Bartell's electro-acoustic ensemble, Bronnt Industries Kapital. In 2000 the pair set up Silent Age Records, a co-operative label which helped gain exposure for their own music as well as artists SJ Esau (Anticon), War Against Sleep (Fire Records), Mole Harness (Stray Dog Army), and Exercise One.

== Journalism ==
Talbot was a freelance journalist, and conducted exclusive interviews with the philosopher John Gray and the comic book writer Alan Moore for the British online arts magazine The Quietus.

Talbot maintained a website archiving his journalistic work and a weblog entitled "The Police Diver's Notebook."

== Band personnel ==
- Nick Talbot - vocals, guitar (1999–2014; his death)
- Chris Macartney - drums (1999–2000)
- Dave Collingwood - drums (2000–2012)
- Huw Cooksley - bass (2004–2007)
- Robin Allender - bass (2007–2012)
- Alex Wilkins - guitar (2007–2012)
- Claire Adams - vocals, drums (2012–2014)
- Rachel Lancaster - vocals, bass, synthesizer (2012–2014)

== Discography ==
=== Singles and EPs ===
- Gas Mask Days EP CDr (Silent Age Records, 2002)
- "The Diver" 7" (For Us Records, 2003)
- Black Holes in the Sand EP LP/CD (Warp Records, 2004)
- "The Velvet Cell" / "See My Friends (edit)" 7" (Warp Records, 2005)
- "Animals" / "Herne the Hunter" Download only single (Warp Records, 2006)
- "Trust" / "Underfoot" 7" (Warp Records, 2007)
- "Hollow Men" / "Longest River" 7" (Warp Records, 2007)
- "Nightwatchman's Blues" / "Farewell, Farewell" 7" doublepack in hand-printed poster sleeve (Warp Records, 2008)
- "The Prize" / "Song to the Siren" 10" (Warp Records, 2012)

=== Albums ===
- Internal Travels CD (Red Square / Mobstar, 2001), second pressing of 500 copies (Silent Age Records, 2003)
- Flashlight Seasons CD (Sink & Stove Records, 2003), re-released internationally on LP/CD (Warp Records, 2004)
- Fires in Distant Buildings LP/CD (Warp Records, 2005)
- The Western Lands LP/CD (Warp Records, 2007)
- The Ghost in Daylight LP/CD (Warp Records, 2012)
- Offerings: Lost Songs 2000 - 2004 LP/CD (Warp Records, 2014, CD only as part of box set)

=== Soundtrack and compilation appearances ===
Certain Gravenhurst tracks have also been contributed to soundtracks and compilations, some of which are not available elsewhere, including:

- "Long Way Home" – (555CD55 – 555 Records compilation, 2003)
- "Damage part III" – (played solo on Irene Trudel's WFMU radio show in 2003).
- "Romance" – (played on Irene Trudel's WFMU radio show in 2003)
- "The Laden Trees" – (Children Are Fascinated by Fire – Fire Records compilation, 2004)
- "Black Holes in the Sand (edit)" – available on certain Warp promos of Black Holes in the Sand, 2004.
- "The Diver" – (Dead Man's Shoes soundtrack, 2004)
- "Stillwater" – (The Hospital Radio Request List Vol II compilation, June 2004)
- "See My Friends (edit)" – (available on a Warp promo CD for "The Velvet Cell" single, 2005)
- "Herne the Hunter" – (bonus track on Japanese edition of Fires in Distant Buildings, 2005)
- "Animals" – (included on the Camden Crawl double CD, 2005)
- "Entertainment (live)" – (Comes with a Smile magazine, issue 20, January 2006)
- "Song among the Pine" – (Ein Freund von Mir soundtrack, October 2006). According to the credits on the soundtrack CD, additional soundscapes were provided on this track by Bronnt Industries Kapital collaborator Guy Bartell.
- "Entertainment" – (Ein Freund von Mir soundtrack, October 2006)
- "Nicole (Instrumental)" – (This Is England soundtrack, May 2007)
- "Paint a Face" (Neil Halstead Tribute 7" by Gravenhurst / Beach Fossils. Sonic Cathedral Recordings, 2012)

== See also ==
- Culture of Bristol
- List of bands from Bristol
- Bronnt Industries Kapital
