= G Is for Deep =

Studio album by Doseone
- Released: May 29, 2012
- Genre: Alternative hip hop
- Length: 41:24
- Label: Anticon
- Producer: Doseone

Doseone chronology
Skeleton Repelent (2007)	G Is for Deep (2012)	G Is for Job (2020)

G Is for Deep is a solo studio album by American hip hop artist Doseone. It was released on Anticon on May 29, 2012.

== Critical reception ==
Professional ratings
Aggregate scores
Source	Rating
Metacritic	66/100
Review scores
Source	Rating
Alarm	favorable
Cokemachineglow	85/100
Exclaim!	favorable
NME	2.5/5 stars
PopMatters	8/10 stars
The Skinny	4/5 stars
Spectrum Culture	4.5/5 stars
Spin	7/10

At Metacritic, which assigns a weighted average score out of 100 to reviews from mainstream critics, G Is for Deep received an average score of 66, based on 7 reviews, indicating "generally favorable reviews".

Bram E. Gieben of The Skinny gave the album 4 stars out of 5, stating, "the beats, which Dose produced, are heavily electro-influenced, with a melodic pop sheen that suits his approach to vocals on this release." He added: "There's little straight-up rap on the album, but Dose's layered, breathy falsetto singing is definitely a product of incredible breath control and strict rhythmic pattern-generation." Ben Cardew of NME gave the album 2.5 stars out of 5, calling it "an alien funk, in which scampering beats collide with wistful vocal lines." Zach Long of Alarm said, "Doseone returns with a record that reaches in new directions while retaining all the unique characteristics that make his music unmistakable."

Azeen Ghorayshi of East Bay Express included it on the "Top Ten Albums of 2012" list.

== Track listing ==
All tracks are written by Doseone.

No.	Title	Length
1.	"Dancing X"	3:28
2.	"Last Life"	4:05
3.	"I Fell"	5:17
4.	"Thy Pattern"	4:02
5.	"Therapist This"	3:54
6.	"End & Egg"	4:05
7.	"Owl Shark"	3:26
8.	"See Answer"	3:42
9.	"Arm in Armageddon"	4:20
10.	"The Bends"	5:05
Total length:		41:24

== Personnel ==
Credits adapted from liner notes.

- Doseone – vocals, production
- Mike Cresswell – mixing, mastering
- Thomas Brendan – design
