= Black Holes in the Sand =

EP by Gravenhurst
- Released: 2004
- Recorded: 2004
- Genre: Shoegazing
- Length: 30:57
- Label: Warp Records
- Producer: Nick Talbot

Gravenhurst chronology
Flashlight Seasons (2004)	Black Holes in the Sand (2004)	Fires in Distant Buildings (2005)

Black Holes in the Sand is a mini-album by the British singer-songwriter Gravenhurst, released shortly after his second album Flashlight Seasons on Warp Records in 2004. It features a cover-version of Hüsker Dü's song "Diane".

== Track listing ==
1. "Black Holes In The Sand" - 7:26
2. "Flowers In Her Hair" - 6:19
3. "Still Water" - 5:48
4. "Winter Moon" - 4:31
5. "Diane " - 4:13
6. "Flashlight Seasons" - 3:20
