= Them (Themselves album) =

Studio album by Themselves
- Released: June 13, 2000
- Genre: Alternative hip-hop
- Length: 64:15
- Label: Anticon
- Producers: Jel, J. Rawls, Moodswing9

Themselves chronology
Them (2000)	The No Music (2002)

Singles from Them
- 1. "Joyful Toy of 1001 Faces" Released: March 1, 1999; 2. "John Brown's Vaporizer" Released: January 12, 2000

Professional ratings
Review scores
Source	Rating
Exclaim!	favorable
Hip Hop Core	3.5/5 stars

Them is the first studio album by American hip-hop duo Themselves. It was originally released under the name Them on Anticon in 2000. In 2003, it was re-released under the name Themselves.

== Critical reception ==
Thomas Quinlan of Exclaim! gave the album a favorable review, calling it "a classic hip-hop album that is destined to forever burst the boundaries of what should be considered hip-hop." Ali Maloney of The Skinny said, "Despite the seemingly simple beats and raps configuration, there is no shortage of jaw-dropping pyrotechnics and originality on show here."

In 2015, Fact placed it at number 96 on its "100 Best Indie Hip-Hop Records of All Time" list.

== Track listing ==
No.	Title	Producer(s)	Length
1.	"I"	Jel	2:25
2.	"Directions to My Special Place"	J. Rawls	4:34
3.	"Joyful Toy of a 1001 Faces"	Jel	4:35
4.	"Revenge of the Fern"	Jel	4:53
5.	"Eating Homework"	Jel	4:08
6.	"Lyrical Cougel" (featuring Pedestrian and Sole)	Moodswing9	4:08
7.	"Grass Skirt & Fruit Hat"	Jel	4:20
8.	"The Crayon Sharpener"	Jel	4:31
9.	"John Brown's Vaporizer" (featuring Mr. Dibbs)	Jel	4:11
10.	"Another Part of the Clown's Brain"	Jel	4:21
11.	"Death of a Thespian"	Moodswing9	4:58
12.	"It's Them"	Jel	5:57
