= Giga Single =

Compilation album by various artists
- Released: March 24, 2001
- Genre: Hip hop
- Length: 63:13
- Label: Anticon
- Producer: DJ Mayonnaise, Alias, Odd Nosdam, Why?, Buck 65, Myleself, Sixtoo, Leland, Emynd, Themselves, Controller 7

Anticon chronology
Music for the Advancement of Hip Hop (1999)	Giga Single (2001)	Anticon Label Sampler: 1999-2004 (2004)

Professional ratings
Review scores
Source	Rating
Abcdr du Son	favorable
Les Inrockuptibles	favorable
UKHH	favorable

Giga Single is a compilation album released by American hip hop record label Anticon in 2001.

== Critical reception ==
Brian Coleman of CMJ New Music Monthly said: "Ranging from the mellow, soul-searching posse manifesto 'We Ain't Fessin'' to Buck 65's Dr. Octagon-ish 'Pen Thief' and Controller 7's excellent instrumental workout, 'Heckles From The Peanut Gallery,' Anticon's strength is obviously its range, with a thread of intelligence, humility and imagination running at all times."

== Track listing ==
No.	Title	Artist(s)	Length
1.	"We Ain't Fessin'"	Anticon	4:39
2.	"Silence (Poor Me Pt. 7)"	Sole	5:37
3.	"You'll Know Where Your Plane Is..."	Why?	2:50
4.	"Pen Thief"	Buck 65	4:38
5.	"Inherited Scars"	Sage Francis	4:32
6.	"Outlook"	Josh Martinez	4:31
7.	"Watching Water"	Alias	4:06
8.	"Grimey Inks the Moment"	Sixtoo	2:42
9.	"Ode to the Modern Woman"	DJ Mayonnaise	3:35
10.	"A.D.D."	Sole & Dose	3:29
11.	"Attack of the Post Modern Pat Boones"	Object Beings	3:04
12.	"Infomercial"	Stuffed Animals	1:32
13.	"Eat"	Odd Nosdam	1:18
14.	"Pedestrian for Vessel"	Brandon	5:34
15.	"My Way Out of a Paper Bag"	Themselves	5:33
16.	"Heckles from the Peanut Gallery"	Controller 7	4:07
17.	"Do the Coffee Grind Dis Dance"	Private Dancer	1:25
