= The Western Lands (album) =

Studio album by Gravenhurst
- Released: 18 September 2007
- Genre: Alternative rock
- Length: 43:00
- Label: Warp Records
- Producer: Nick Talbot

Gravenhurst chronology
Fires in Distant Buildings (2005)	'''The Western Lands''' (2007)	The Ghost in Daylight (2012)

Professional ratings
Aggregate scores
Source	Rating
Metacritic	78/100
Review scores
Source	Rating
AllMusic	4.5/5 stars
Pitchfork Media	6.8/10

The Western Lands is the fourth album by Gravenhurst, released on Warp Records.

== Track listing ==
1. "Saints" - 3:24
2. "She Dances" - 4:01
3. "Hollow Men" - 3:58
4. "Song Among the Pine" - 4:11
5. "Trust" - 4:06
6. "The Western Lands" - 4:14
7. "Farewell, Farewell" - 3:14
8. "Hourglass" - 4:46
9. "Grand Union Canal" - 6:05
10. "The Collector" - 4:56
