= Lillian (album) =

Studio album by Alias & Ehren
- Released: August 22, 2005
- Genres: Instrumental hip-hop, electronica, jazz
- Length: 56:36
- Label: Anticon
- Producer: Alias

Alias chronology
All Things Fixable (2005)	Lillian (2005)	Brookland/Oaklyn (2006)

Professional ratings
Review scores
Source	Rating
AllMusic	4/5 stars
Brainwashed	favorable
The Daily Barometer	favorable
Dusted Magazine	favorable
Exclaim!	favorable
Okayplayer	50/100
Orlando Weekly	favorable
SF Weekly	favorable
The Skinny	3/5 stars
XLR8R	favorable

Lillian is the only collaborative studio album by Alias (Brendon Whitney) & Ehren (Ehren Whitney). It was released on Anticon in 2005. The album is named after their grandmother.

== Critical reception ==
Marisa Brown of AllMusic gave the album 4 stars out of 5, saying: "There's never a climax or any kind of resolution; rather, it's just the fading in and out of ideas, but despite the fact that the formula becomes apparent after a few songs, nothing ever gets boring." She called it "a troubling, sweet record that's more than willing to immerse itself in abstraction and a lack of clarity, stimulating thought instead of giving distinct answers, which makes it quite a powerful accomplishment." Rachel Devitt of SF Weekly said: "With a benevolent, knowing touch, sponsors Alias and Ehren gently guide their wards into their new lives as functioning members of ambient, beat-driven hip hop."

== Track listing ==
No.	Title	Length
1.	"Eman Ruosis Iht"	4:35
2.	"Back and Forth"	5:00
3.	"Lillian"	5:42
4.	"Sunfuzz"	1:02
5.	"Miso Stomp"	4:12
6.	"Ladders"	5:14
7.	"Blurry Edges"	3:09
8.	"52nd & West"	4:20
9.	"Most Important Things"	4:20
10.	"Moonfuzz"	1:04
11.	"Narrowed Iris"	4:08
12.	"Cobblestoned Waltz"	3:38
13.	"Netting Applause"	4:41

== Personnel ==
Credits adapted from liner notes.

- Alias – guitar, sampler, keyboards, drum programming, production, arrangement, recording, mixing, photography
- Ehren – alto saxophone, soprano saxophone, flute, clarinet, keyboards, drum programming, photography
- Jeremy Goody – mastering
- Baillie Parker – executive production
- Roger Bacon – art direction
