= Still Alive (album) =

Studio album by DJ Mayonnaise
- Released: July 17, 2007
- Genre: Instrumental hip-hop
- Length: 49:20
- Label: Anticon
- Producer: DJ Mayonnasie

DJ Mayonnaise chronology
55 Stories (1999)	Still Alive (2007)

Still Alive is the second solo studio album by American hip-hop producer DJ Mayonnaise. It was released on Anticon in 2007.

== Critical reception ==
Professional ratings
Review scores
Source	Rating
AllMusic	3.5/5 stars
Exclaim!	favorable
Incendiary Magazine	favorable
Pitchfork	4.3/10
PopMatters	5/10 stars

Stewart Mason of AllMusic gave the album 3.5 stars out of 5, saying, "DJ Mayonnaise does a fair job of keeping the potentially over-familiar arrangements and samples from coalescing into just another bit of negligible atmosphere for a boutique hotel bar near you, through unexpectedly tuneful melodies like 'Easily Distracted' and the album's one stylistic departure, the sneering Bush slam 'Strateegery.'" Lana Cooper of PopMatters commented that "Still Alive isn't a bad sophomore effort, but it's certainly not an epic masterwork that requires eight years in the making." She added, "While there are definite moments that shine, there are others that take a leap backwards or just stay floating somewhere in the middle."

On May 14, 2007, the album was included on XLR8R's "Office Top Ten Album Picks" list.

== Track listing ==
All tracks are written by Chris Greer.

No.	Title	Length
1.	"Post Reformat"	4:40
2.	"Easily Distracted"	3:31
3.	"May Days"	4:08
4.	"The Windham Song"	3:39
5.	"15 Amp Circuit"	1:11
6.	"Strateegery" (featuring K-the-I???)	3:58
7.	"Dawson's Anthem 2005"	4:14
8.	"Munjoy Moments"	4:00
9.	"Quiet on the Set"	4:55
10.	"The End of the Beginning"	3:02
11.	"Untitled" / "Elecinstv2"	12:02
Total length:		49:20

== Personnel ==
Credits adapted from liner notes.

- DJ Mayonnaise – production
- Mike Ouellette – clarinet (3), tenor saxophone (4)
- Josh Thelin – alto saxophone (4, 7)
- Chris Gerrity – guitar (4)
- K-the-I??? – vocals (6)
- Tim Young – guitar (11)
- Mat "DJ RPM" Young – technical hand holding
- Agent 8 – mastering
- Chris Rossi – photography
- Sam Flax Keener – layout
- Baillie Parker – executive production
