= Resurgam (album) =

Studio album by Alias
- Released: August 26, 2008
- Genre: Instrumental hip-hop
- Length: 48:13
- Label: Anticon
- Producer: Alias

Alias chronology
Collected Remixes (2007)	Resurgam (2008)	Fever Dream (2011)

Professional ratings
Aggregate scores
Source	Rating
Metacritic	79/100
Review scores
Source	Rating
AllMusic	4/5 stars
The A.V. Club	A−
East Bay Express	favorable
Pitchfork	7.0/10
PopMatters	6/10 stars
Sputnikmusic	2.5 (average)
XLR8R	favorable

Resurgam is a solo studio album by American hip-hop musician Alias. It was released on Anticon in 2008. It features guest appearances from Yoni Wolf and The One AM Radio. The title is Latin for "I shall rise again".

== Critical reception ==
At Metacritic, which assigns a weighted average score out of 100 to reviews from mainstream critics, Resurgam received an average score of 79% based on 6 reviews, indicating "generally favorable reviews".

David Jeffries of AllMusic gave the album 4 stars out of 5, saying: "Putting paranoia and noir to the side for the moment, Alias has created his most welcoming and positive dream world on Resurgam, an album where the creaks comfort and the low cloud cover comes off as heavenly." Mia Lily Clarke of Pitchfork gave the album a 7.0 out of 10, saying: "While Resurgam is a record of many different moods, and unashamedly derivative of Alias' influences, it maintains a distinctive, concrete consistency." She added: "This is largely due to Alias' impressive talent for arrangements; the material is deftly woven with a great ear for detail, and there really is something to appeal to almost everyone."

== Track listing ==
No.	Title	Length
1.	"New to a Few"	2:34
2.	"I Heart Drum Machines"	4:47
3.	"Well Water Black" (featuring Yoni Wolf)	6:01
4.	"Oakland Morning"	1:32
5.	"M.G. Jack"	4:52
6.	"Prelude to a Death Watch"	1:17
7.	"Death Watch"	4:10
8.	"Place of No More Choices"	1:07
9.	"Resurgam"	3:00
10.	"Autumnal Ego"	4:17
11.	"Weathering" (featuring The One AM Radio)	4:30
12.	"Justamachine"	4:53
13.	"Oakland in the Rearview"	5:19

== Personnel ==
Credits adapted from liner notes.

- Alias – production, arrangement, recording, mixing, mastering
- Yoni Wolf – lyrics (3), vocals (3), Rhodes piano (3), bass guitar (3)
- Hrishikesh Hirway – lyrics (11), vocals (11), guitar (11), trumpet (11), bells (11)
- Sam Flax Keener – art direction, layout
- Jenn Whitney – photography
