= Crowns Down & Company =

Remix album by Themselves
- Released: September 21, 2010
- Genre: Alternative hip-hop
- Length: 44:47
- Label: Anticon
- Producers: Themselves, Dälek, Buck 65, Alias, 13 & God, Lazer Sword, Our Brother the Native, Odd Nosdam, Baths, Bracken

Themselves chronology
Crowns Down (2009)	Crowns Down & Company (2010)

Professional ratings
Review scores
Source	Rating
The 405	7/10
Tiny Mix Tapes	3.5/5 stars

Crowns Down & Company (stylized as CrownsDown & Company) is a remix album by American hip-hop duo Themselves. It includes remixes of songs from the duo's third studio album Crowns Down. It was released on Anticon in 2010.

== Critical reception ==
Timothy Archer of The 405 gave the album a 7 out of 10, saying, "CrownsDown & Company will probably appeal more to the partisan audience than new listeners searching for an entrance point into Themselves' canon, but it represents a fine addition to that collection, and will no doubt give fans and club-goers many moments of happiness, curiosity and dancing."

== Track listing ==
No.	Title	Length
1.	"Back II Burn (Themselves Remix)"	4:07
2.	"Oversleeping (Dälek Remix)"	3:29
3.	"The Mark (Buck 65 Remix)"	5:24
4.	"Gangster of Disbelief (Alias Remix)"	3:24
5.	"Daxstrong (13 & God Remix)"	4:27
6.	"You Ain't It (Lazer Sword Remix)"	4:56
7.	"Roman Is As Roman Does (Our Brother the Native Remix)"	4:14
8.	"Skinning the Drum (Odd Nosdam Remix)"	4:15
9.	"Deadcatclear II (Baths Remix)"	3:41
10.	"Gold Teeth Will Roll (Bracken Remix)"	3:34
11.	"Antarctica"	3:22
