= Wrong Faced Cat Feed Collapse =

Studio album by SJ Esau
- Released: 17 March 2007
- Genre: Indie rock
- Length: 33:35
- Label: Anticon
- Producer: SJ Esau

SJ Esau chronology
Wrong Faced Cat Feed Collapse (2007)	Small Vessel (2008)

Wrong Faced Cat Feed Collapse is the first studio album by British indie rock musician SJ Esau. Originally released in 2005, it was re-released on Anticon in 2007.

== Critical reception ==
Professional ratings
Review scores
Source	Rating
Alarm	favorable
AllMusic	2.5/5 stars
Cokemachineglow	79%
Pitchfork	4.2/10

Marisa Brown of AllMusic gave the album 2.5 stars out of 5, commenting that "[SJ] Esau's voice -- part singsongy whine, part breathy croon -- works well as a vessel for the absurdity he's trying to convey, but its contrast to the relatively straightforward, repetitive, even occasionally boring instrumentals behind him can be off-putting." Joe Tangari of Pitchfork gave the album a 4.2 out of 10, writing, "Focused melodies simply don't live here, which makes it hard to keep coming back to even the better arrangements." He added, "[Sam] Wisternoff certainly knows how to handle timbre and tone, but without marrying them to song, he's created an overly uniform record that doesn't stick." Dom Sinacola of Cokemachineglow gave the album a 79% rating, stating, "In fact, everything about Wrong Faced Cat Feed Collapse is overstated, from the milquetoast politics to the dins of release splitting most of the songs into parts."

== Track listing ==
All tracks are written by Sam Wisternoff

No.	Title	Length
1.	"(Untitled)"	0:32
2.	"Cat Track (He Has No Balls)"	3:41
3.	"The Wrong Order"	3:35
4.	"Geography"	3:39
5.	"Wears the Control"	5:24
6.	"(Untitled)"	0:06
7.	"(Untitled)"	0:06
8.	"I Got a Bad"	1:44
9.	"All Agog"	3:10
10.	"Queezy Beliefs"	4:30
11.	"Halfway Up the Pathway"	2:04
12.	"Lazy Eye"	5:48
Total length:		33:35
