= Skeleton Repelent =

Studio album by Doseone
- Released: 2007
- Genre: Indie hip-hop
- Length: 37:20
- Producer: Doseone

Doseone chronology
Soft Skulls (2005)	Skeleton Repelent (2007)	Be Evil (2009)

Professional ratings
Review scores
Source	Rating
Cokemachineglow	74

Skeleton Repelent is the fourth solo album by American indie hip-hop artist Doseone. It was released in 2007. The album features contributions from Dan Boeckner of Wolf Parade.

== Track listing ==
1. You Circa You - 3:27
2. Win It Off II - 2:29
3. Tar Of Day - 5:33
4. Death Death Death Death Death - 2:14
5. The Line In The Cold (featuring Dan Boeckner) - 3:33
6. Hardest Laugh - 2:39
7. The Great Compromise - 7:53
8. Mom - 3:36
9. Hell Of January - 2:37
10. Overchoiced (featuring Dan Boeckner) - 3:18
