= Soft Money (album) =

Studio album by Jel
- Released: February 20, 2006
- Genre: Hip-hop
- Length: 40:16
- Label: Anticon
- Producer: Jel

Jel chronology
10 Seconds (2002)	Soft Money (2006)	Late Pass (2013)

Singles from Soft Money
- 1. "WMD / All Around" Released: January 16, 2006

Professional ratings
Aggregate scores
Source	Rating
Metacritic	67/100
Review scores
Source	Rating
AllMusic	4/5 stars
BBC	3.5/5 stars
Cokemachineglow	59/100
East Bay Express	favorable
Exclaim!	mixed
Pitchfork	6.0/10
Prefix	7.0/10
SF Weekly	favorable
The Skinny	4/5 stars
Stylus Magazine	C+

Soft Money is the second studio album by American hip-hop artist Jel. It was released on Anticon on February 20, 2006. "WMD / All Around" was released as a single from the album.

== Critical reception ==
At Metacritic, which assigns a weighted average score out of 100 to reviews from mainstream critics, Soft Money received an average score of 67% based on 14 reviews, indicating "generally favorable reviews".

Brian Howe of Pitchfork gave the album a 6.0 out of 10, describing it as "a murky palimpsest of disembodied samples and dirty beats, incantatory rhymes and live instrumentation, leftist rhetoric and absurdist non sequiturs, breathy female vocals and ephemeral melodies". Martin Longley of BBC said: "There are few dynamic surprises here, and no serrated edges, but this disc's strength lies in its building mass of lumbering, decelerated funk, its textures gluey and thick." Luciana Lopez of XLR8R said: "The album slices and dices genres throughout, and the music sounds all the better for it." Bram Gieben of The Skinny gave the album 4 stars out of 5, calling it "one of the most rewarding Anticon releases so far."

== Track listing ==
No.	Title	Length
1.	"To Buy a Car"	2:55
2.	"All Day Breakfast"	4:18
3.	"No Solution"	3:37
4.	"All Around"	3:21
5.	"Thrashin"	4:03
6.	"Sweet Cream in It"	2:16
7.	"Soft Money, Dry Bones"	3:39
8.	"Know You Don't"	3:34
9.	"WMD"	4:36
10.	"Mislead"	1:56
11.	"Nice Last"	4:25
12.	"Chipmunk Technique"	1:36

== Personnel ==
Credits adapted from liner notes.

- Jel – writing, production, performance, recording, arrangement
- Odd Nosdam – additional recording, mixing, editing, song arrangement, sounds, filter play, drone (8)
- Yoni Wolf – piano (2), synthesizer (2)
- Josiah Wolf – bass guitar (2)
- Andrew Broder – guitar (3)
- Dosh – Rhodes piano (3), sampler (3)
- Alexander Kort – cello (3)
- Stefanie Böhm – words (4), vocals (4, 7), guitar (4)
- Harvey Salters – synthesizer (4), keyboards (8)
- Pedestrian – words (7)
- Wise Intelligent – words (9), vocals (9)
- Adam Drucker – cover art design, sculpture, photography
- Erin Perry – cover art design, sculpture, photography
- Wes Winship – font, layout
