= 55 Stories =

Studio album by DJ Mayonnaise
- Released: January 4, 1999
- Genre: Instrumental hip-hop
- Length: 55:55
- Label: Anticon
- Producer: DJ Mayonnaise

DJ Mayonnaise chronology
55 Stories (1999)	Still Alive (2007)

55 Stories is the first solo studio album by American hip-hop producer DJ Mayonnaise. It was released on Anticon in 1999.

== Production ==
All of the records used on the album are rock music or jazz, mostly from the late 1960s to mid 1970s. In a 2008 interview, DJ Mayonnaise said: "I made 55 Stories in one shot from start to finish. I had no blueprint or pre-conceived idea. All I did was made a mixtape album on a borrowed Tascam 4-track recorder. I went back and did some small edits after I was done, but the structure and song order was a straight shot. I just made an intro and recorded it. After that I made a beat and recorded that and scratched over it. I just repeated that process until I hit somewhere around 55 minutes (hence the title)."

== Critical reception ==
Professional ratings
Review scores
Source	Rating
Urban Smarts	favorable

Tadah of Urban Smarts gave the album a favorable review, writing, "Maybe we just were stuck within the hoopla that's surrounding the Anticon emcees, that we totally forgot that this gathering also has some of the illest beatsmiths amongst them."

== Track listing ==
All tracks are written by Chris Greer.

No.	Title	Length
1.	"Intro/Center of the Universe"	2:34
2.	"Two Sides of the Fence"	4:18
3.	"Da Da Da Da....Da"	2:12
4.	"Aquarius"	2:02
5.	"Divine Disappointment Revisited"	3:14
6.	"Wizard Unrobed"	2:31
7.	"Paper Cliche"	4:58
8.	"DJ Signify Can't Do This"	3:51
9.	"Sinful Strut"	3:11
10.	"Diggin in Moodswing's Crates"	1:44
11.	"A Hundred Words"	2:45
12.	"www.miravie.com"	2:44
13.	"Swedish Orgy"	2:00
14.	"Words of Wisdom"	2:53
15.	"DJs Shouldn't Talk/Ozzy Rules"	2:44
16.	"Dr. Me"	2:46
17.	"Fisbys Tavern"	2:03
18.	"Inner Suzie"	2:54
19.	"Sample Here"	2:01
20.	"San Francisco Sing-A-Long"	2:09
21.	"Outro"	1:33
Total length:		55:55

== Personnel ==
Credits adapted from liner notes.

- DJ Mayonnaise – production
- John Wyman – mastering
- Shalem Bencivenga – cover art
- Rev. Destructo – layout, design
