= Small Vessel =

Studio album by SJ Esau
- Released: 24 June 2008
- Genre: Indie rock
- Length: 34:20
- Label: Anticon
- Producer: SJ Esau

SJ Esau chronology
Wrong Faced Cat Feed Collapse (2007)	Small Vessel (2008)	Exploding Views (2014)

Small Vessel is the second studio album by British indie rock musician SJ Esau. It was released on Anticon in 2008.

== Critical reception ==
Professional ratings
Review scores
Source	Rating
Cokemachineglow	74%
Pitchfork	3.6/10
PopMatters	8/10 stars
Tiny Mix Tapes	3/5 stars

Matt Rinaldi of AllMusic commented that Small Vessel "continues in the same genre-bending vein as its predecessor, blending elements of indie rock, folk, hip-hop, house, techno-pop, and industrial to create an end-product that is delightfully disorienting." Dave Gurney of Tiny Mix Tapes gave the album 3 stars out of 5, writing, "Like being let into a friend's bedroom studio while he or she pores over partially and/or cryptically labeled tapes containing songs and experiments at varying states of completion, SJ Esau's sophomore effort Small Vessels has the initially intoxicating feeling of being let in on a secret treasure trove of restless musical creativity." He added, "Untitled bits of sonic debris mix with false starts of songs; hushed passages give way to lush arrangements of vocal and instrumental beauty bordering on the epic; and unexpected transitions and breaks suddenly expand or shrink the dynamic space in which they exist." Evan McGarvey of Pitchfork gave the album a 3.6 out of 10, stating that "Small Vessel's strengths aren't unique; you can find dozens of whimsical, pseudo-surreal songwriters of this ilk (Why?, The Guillemots, Thee More Shallows, to start) who clutter their discs with fewer scribbles and less back-handed flippancy."

== Track listing ==
All tracks are written by Sam Wisternoff

No.	Title	Length
1.	"(Untitled)"	0:07
2.	"Frustrating"	2:47
3.	"Small Vessel"	0:18
4.	"Bastard Eyes"	3:44
5.	"I Threw a Wobbly"	3:05
6.	"Under Certain Things"	4:35
7.	"Bubblehead"	2:28
8.	"(Untitled)"	0:06
9.	"Ruddy Spark"	1:53
10.	"The Small Percent"	3:39
11.	"Slate"	1:26
12.	"Death Perception Lack"	3:16
13.	"Human Annoyed"	1:40
14.	"(Untitled)"	1:01
15.	"What Happen'd"	4:14
Total length:		34:20
