= Bronnt Industries Kapital =

Bronnt Industries Kapital is a musical project from Bristol, England based around producer and multi-instrumentalist Guy Bartell. It has released six studio albums, Virtute et Industria, Häxan, Hard for Justice, Turksib, Arsenal and Force The Line.

Bronnt Industries Kapital's first releases were limited edition CDs and vinyl on Bristol label Silent Age, Clean Cut and Float Records. The first album was 2005's Virtute et Industria, released on UK independent label Static Caravan Recordings. This was followed in 2007 by an original soundtrack commissioned for the DVD release of the cult Swedish silent film Häxan by Tartan Films, which was collected on a stand-alone soundtrack album released by Static Caravan the following year. In 2009 Bronnt Industries Kapital released its third album Hard for Justice on the Berlin, Germany label Get Physical Music. In 2015, Bronnt Industries Kapital released its fourth album Turksib on I Own You Records, an album taken from Bartell's soundtrack to the 1929 Soviet documentary film of the same name by Viktor Turin, which was commissioned by the British Film Institute for their DVD/Blu-ray release The Soviet Influence: From Turksib to Night Mail. In 2018 Bronnt Industries Kapital released its fifth album Arsenal on I Own You Records, an album taken from Bartell's soundtrack to the 1929 Soviet war film of the same name by Ukrainian director Oleksandr Dovzhenko, which was commissioned by Dovzhenko Centre (the state film archive of Ukraine) and the British Council. In 2019 Bronnt Industries Kapital released its sixth album Force The Line on Giallo Disco.

The first Bronnt Industries Kapital album was described as gaslight horrortonica, and featured references to H. P. Lovecraft and the use of automated Victorian instruments such as Lepping's Patented Lapwing Harmonium and the Bronson Quartet. Hard for Justice found Bronnt expanding its sound palette, with the use of live instrumentation and elements of Kosmische musik, Italo disco, post-punk and shoegazing. Bartell has often cited his love of film as influencing the Bronnt sound, including psychotronic exploitation, Italo-crime and no-budget action thrillers as well as library music from BBC sci-fi and supernatural TV drama

Bartell has previously collaborated with Gravenhurst’s Nick Talbot on tracks on the first and third Bronnt Industries Kapital albums (they also set up Silent Age Records in 2000). He has been joined in the live group by various members over Bronnt’s history including Nick Talbot, Tom Bugs, Max Milton, François Marry, Antoni Maiovvi and Duncan Fleming. As of 2009 Bartell has been performing Bronnt shows solo.

Bartell has also been involved in the group War Against Sleep for many years, playing instruments in the live band and on recordings.

== Discography ==
=== Albums ===
- 2005: Virtute et Industria LPCD (Static Caravan Records)
- 2008: Häxan CD (Static Caravan Records)
- 2009: Hard for Justice LPCD (Get Physical Music)
- 2015: Turksib LP (I Own You Records)
- 2018: Arsenal LP (I Own You Records)
- 2019: Force The Line LP (Giallo Disco)

=== Singles ===
- 2003: "Polaris" / "Last Hope Sound" 7-inch single (Clean Cut / Float / Silent Age Records)
- 2006: "Under Certain Things" / "Aerial" split 7-inch single with SJ Esau (Static Caravan Records)
- 2009: "Objects & Purpose" 12-inch single (Get Physical Music)

=== EPs ===
- 2002: Untitled EP (Silent Age Records)
- 2005: Brocken EP lathe-cut 8" (Static Caravan Records)

=== Soundtracks ===
- 2007: Häxan: Witchcraft Through The Ages Soundtrack DVD (Tartan Films)
- 2011: Turksib Soundtrack on The Soviet Influence: From Turksib to Night Mail DVD/Blu-ray (British Film Institute)
