= Watered Lawn =

Studio album by Raleigh Moncrief
- Released: October 25, 2011
- Genre: Electronic
- Length: 38:30
- Label: Anticon
- Producer: Raleigh Moncrief

Raleigh Moncrief chronology
Watered Lawn (2011)	Dusted (2013)

Professional ratings
Review scores
Source	Rating
Consequence of Sound	C+
Drowned in Sound	8/10
L.A. Record	favorable
PopMatters	5/10 stars
The Skinny	4/5 stars
Spin	favorable

Watered Lawn is the first studio album by American record producer Raleigh Moncrief. It was released on Anticon on October 25, 2011.

== Reception ==
Al Horner of Drowned in Sound gave the album an 8 out of 10, describing it as "a dizzying rush of grinding synths, sun-splashed harmonies and wide-eyed eccentricity – with a strange beauty to match its outlandishness."

It was ranked at number 19 on Tiny Mix Tapes' "Favorite 25 Album Covers of 2011" list.

== Track listing ==
No.	Title	Length
1.	"The Air"	4:59
2.	"A Day to Die"	4:10
3.	"I Just Saw"	3:59
4.	"In This Grass"	4:07
5.	"Cast Out for Days"	4:37
6.	"Lament for Morning"	2:48
7.	"The Right Idea"	1:53
8.	"Don't Shoot"	3:01
9.	"Time Passed By"	2:45
10.	"Waiting for My Brothers Here"	3:14
11.	"Mothers"	2:57
