= Muted (album) =

Studio album by Alias
- Released: October 28, 2003
- Genre: Instrumental hip-hop
- Length: 64:22
- Label: Anticon
- Producer: Alias

Alias chronology
The Other Side of the Looking Glass (2002)	Muted (2003)	Collected Remixes (2007)

Singles from Muted
- 1. "Unseen Sights" Released: 2003

Professional ratings
Review scores
Source	Rating
AllMusic	3/5 stars
Pitchfork	6.0/10
Stylus Magazine	C−

Muted is a solo studio album by American hip-hop musician Alias. It was released on Anticon in 2003. It features guest appearances from Markus Acher and Pedestrian. The album peaked at number 198 on the CMJ Radio 200 chart.

== Critical reception ==
David Jeffries of AllMusic gave the album 3 stars out of 5, calling it "humble and approachable." He added, "Boom Bip at his most melodic and Boards of Canada minus the cheeky humor could be comparisons, but Alias has his own voice, even if he's not rapping."

== Track listing ==
No.	Title	Length
1.	"Beginagain"	4:30
2.	"Sixes Last"	4:58
3.	"Again for the First Time"	3:54
4.	"Unseen Sights" (featuring Markus Acher)	4:25
5.	"Shoes, Cars, and Soft Drinks"	3:21
6.	"Caged In, Wasting Away"	4:22
7.	"Full Circle Blues"	3:35
8.	"I Would Like to Write a Song That..."	4:12
9.	"Am I Cool Now?"	1:43
10.	"Chew the Fat"	4:05
11.	"The Physical Voice" (featuring Pedestrian)	3:40
12.	"One Obvious Rule"	4:28
13.	"Lost Friend Advice"	4:55

== Personnel ==
Credits adapted from liner notes.

- Alias – production, arrangement, recording, mixing, photography
- Valerie Trebeljahr – lyrics (4)
- Markus Acher – lyrics (4), vocals (4), electric guitar (4), acoustic guitar (4)
- Dax Pierson – melodica (4)
- Mario Thaler – additional recording (4)
- Pedestrian – lyrics (11), vocals (11)
- Jeremy Goody – mastering
- Baillie Parker – executive production
- Roger Bacon – art direction
