= Late Pass =

Studio album by Jel
- Released: August 20, 2013
- Recorded: 2007–2013
- Studio: Burnco, Berkeley, California
- Genre: Hip hop
- Length: 30:13
- Label: Anticon
- Producer: Jel, Odd Nosdam

Jel chronology
Soft Money (2006)	Late Pass (2013)

Professional ratings
Review scores
Source	Rating
Alarm	favorable
The Skinny	5/5 stars

Late Pass is the third studio album by American hip hop artist Jel. It was released on Anticon on August 20, 2013. Music videos were created for "Look Up", "Breathe", and "Steady".

== Critical reception ==
Bram E. Gieben of The Skinny gave the album 5 stars out of 5, saying, "this is an album that demands to be listened to as a whole, preferably on vinyl, and experienced in its raw, uncut form in the live arena." Ian S. Port of SF Weekly said, "The mood is dark, the beats are impeccably constructed, and his bleak rhymes are delivered in a mumbling deadpan, often barely present in the mix."

== Track listing ==
No.	Title	Length
1.	"Late Pass"	4:35
2.	"Thnk4U"	2:27
3.	"Steady"	3:29
4.	"La Resolve"	4:22
5.	"Look Up"	4:38
6.	"Breathe"	3:51
7.	"Bubble"	3:12
8.	"Romantisch"	3:39

== Personnel ==
Credits adapted from liner notes.

- Jel – writing, performance, production, arrangement, mixing, Jel logo
- Odd Nosdam – production, arrangement, mixing, cover design
- Jesse Nichols – final mixing
- Daddy Kev – mastering
- Bre'r – guitar (6)
