= Learning to Walk (Sole album) =

Compilation album by Sole
- Released: April 9, 2002
- Recorded: 1994–1998
- Genre: Hip hop
- Length: 67:35
- Label: 6 Months
- Producers: Alias, Moodswing9, Sample 208, Randy Nkonoki

Sole chronology
Bottle of Humans (2000)	Learning to Walk (2002)	Man's Best Friend (2002)

Professional ratings
Review scores
Source	Rating
AllMusic	3/5 stars

Learning to Walk is a compilation of early Sole singles and demos recorded between 1994 and 1998, released on the Anticon sister label, 6 Months.

== Track listing ==
No.	Title	Producer(s)	Length
1.	"Prosperity"	Alias	4:20
2.	"3rd Person"	Moodswing9	3:44
3.	"Losers at the Edge" (featuring Mr. Skurge, Infinito, and Alias)	Mr. Skurge	5:25
4.	"Banquet of Sarcasm"	Alias	4:24
5.	"3 Guys in a Bar" (featuring D-Stroy and Mr. Complex)	Moodswing9	4:21
6.	"Lyrically Able" (featuring Adeem and Alias)	Alias	3:33
7.	"The Video Game Song" (featuring Alias)	Moodswing9	3:56
8.	"Mr. Bojangles" (featuring Ripone)	Sample 208	4:55
9.	"Respect"	Sample 208	5:57
10.	"Finally"	Moddswing9	3:46
11.	"Respect"	DJ Shame	5:07
12.	"Body of Works"	Moodswing9	3:10
13.	"Down By Lore"		2:35
14.	"Live By the Mic"	Sample 208	5:32
15.	"Sole"	Randy Nkonoki	3:05
16.	"Give Me My Medal"	Sample 208	3:45
