= See Me Not =

Studio album by Saroos
- Released: November 9, 2010
- Genres: Post-rock, electronica
- Length: 33:58
- Labels: Anticon, Alien Transistor
- Producer: Odd Nosdam

Saroos chronology
Saroos (2006)	See Me Not (2010)	Return (2013)

Professional ratings
Review scores
Source	Rating
Futuresequence	favorable
HHV.de Mag	7.5/10 stars
Incendiary Magazine	favorable
PopMatters	8/10 stars
Potholes in My Blog	4/5 stars
Venus Zine	3/5 stars

See Me Not is the second album from German post-rock trio Saroos. It was released on Anticon in the United States and on Alien Transistor elsewhere in 2010.

The album is produced by Odd Nosdam.

XLR8R premiered the track "Yukoma" from the album on September 22, 2010.

== Reception ==
See Me Not is listed as number 19 on the We Fear Change Top Albums of 2010.

== Track listing ==
No.	Title	Length
1.	"Lobster Claw"	4:05
2.	"Daylight Chant"	4:37
3.	"Fog People"	4:53
4.	"See Me Not"	5:21
5.	"Scott"	3:52
6.	"Yukoma"	4:38
7.	"Tyden Divu"	4:04
8.	"Outrigger"	2:28
