= Fever Dream (Alias album) =

Studio album by Alias
- Released: August 30, 2011
- Studios: The Resurgam Compound, South Portland, Maine
- Genre: Instrumental hip-hop
- Length: 42:33
- Label: Anticon
- Producer: Alias

Alias chronology
Resurgam (2008)	Fever Dream (2011)	Pitch Black Prism (2014)

Professional ratings
Aggregate scores
Source	Rating
Metacritic	74/100
Review scores
Source	Rating
AllMusic	3.5/5 stars
Consequence of Sound	A−
Pitchfork	7.2/10
PopMatters	6/10 stars
Resident Advisor	3.5/5
The Skinny	4/5 stars

Fever Dream is a solo studio album by American hip-hop musician Alias. It was released on Anticon in 2011.

== Critical reception ==
At Metacritic, which assigns a weighted average score out of 100 to reviews from mainstream critics, Fever Dream received an average score of 74% based on 9 reviews, indicating "generally favorable reviews".

Ali Maloney of The Skinny gave the album 4 stars out of 5, describing it as "a suave cocktail of rolling snares, haunting synth structures, downtempo dub and jittering slices of shoegaze – tastefully evoking the strengths of various modern masters, from FlyLo to Amon Tobin – as swirling, cut-up vocals bounce gleefully around in the distance."

== Track listing ==
No.	Title	Length
1.	"Goinswimmin"	2:53
2.	"Wanna Let It Go"	3:51
3.	"Revi Is Divad"	4:00
4.	"No Choice"	1:27
5.	"Dahorses"	4:00
6.	"Lady Lambin'"	4:13
7.	"Talk in Technicolor"	3:22
8.	"Feverdreamin"	3:25
9.	"Boom Boom Boom"	4:50
10.	"Tagine"	3:30
11.	"Sugarpeeeee"	3:16
12.	"Wrap"	3:50

== Personnel ==
Credits adapted from liner notes.

- Alias – production, arrangement, recording, mixing
- Michael Haggett – drums (5)
- DJ Mayonnaise – additional synthesizer (5), additional production (5), additional recording (5)
- Dax Pierson – vocals (7), additional synthesizer (7)
- Daddy Kev – mastering
- Jesselisa Moretti – cover art, design, layout
