= David Madson =

David Madson may refer to:

- David Madson, the birth name of Odd Nosdam, (born 1976), American underground hip hop producer, DJ and visual artist
- David Madson (architect), victim of the serial killer Andrew Cunanan
