= Raleigh Moncrief =

- Origin: Sacramento, California
- Genres: Instrumental hip hop, electronic
- Occupation(s): Producer, singer
- Years active: 2009–2019
- Labels: 5 Rue Christine, Ipecac Recordings, Sargent House, Anticon, Domino Records, Warp Records
- Website: raleighmoncrief.net

Raleigh Moncrief is an American electronic musician, record producer and recording engineer who has worked with Zach Hill, Dirty Projectors and !!!.

== History ==
The debut album, Watered Lawn, was released on Anticon in 2011.

== Discography ==
=== Albums ===
- Watered Lawn (Anticon, 2011)

=== EPs ===
- Combed Over Chrome (2009)
- Carpal Tunnels (2010)
- Vitamins (2010)
- 4-Way Split (2010) with Ellie Fortune, Mason Lindahl, Zach Hill
- "Dusted" (Anticon, 2013)

=== Remixes ===
- Tera Melos – "Frozen Zoo (Raleigh Moncrief Remix)" from "Frozen Zoo" (2010)
- Dirty Projectors – "Cool Your Heart (Raleigh Moncrief Remix)" from "Cool Your Heart (Remixes)" (Domino Records, 2017)
