= Eyes Closed EP =

EP by Alias
- Released: July 29, 2003
- Genre: Instrumental hip-hop
- Length: 20:18
- Label: Anticon
- Producer: Alias

Professional ratings
Review scores
Source	Rating
Pitchfork	(6.0/10)
Tiny Mix Tapes	3/5 stars

Eyes Closed EP is a studio EP by American hip-hop musician Alias. It was released on Anticon in 2003.

The EP is his first instrumental-only release.

== Track listing ==
No.	Title	Length
1.	"Eyes Closed"	4:17
2.	"What Used to Be"	3:43
3.	"Must Consume"	4:03
4.	"Dec. 26th, 2002"	4:33
5.	"Things Got a Little Ugly"	3:42
