= Brookland/Oaklyn =

Studio album by Alias & Tarsier
- Released: May 23, 2006
- Genre: Electronica, trip hop
- Length: 47:59
- Label: Anticon
- Producer: Alias

Alias & Tarsier chronology
Brookland/Oaklyn (2006)	Plane That Draws a White Line (2006)

Singles from Brookland/Oaklyn
- 1. "Dr. C / 5 Year Eve" Released: 2006

Professional ratings
Review scores
Source	Rating
AllMusic	3.5/5 stars
Drowned in Sound	5/10
Pitchfork	7.0/10
Prefix	favorable
Rock Music Review	7.2/10
Stylus Magazine	C+
XLR8R	unfavorable

Brookland/Oaklyn is the only collaborative studio album by Alias & Tarsier. It was released on Anticon in 2006.

== Critical reception ==
Brian Howe of Pitchfork gave the album a 7.0 out of 10, saying, "for the bulk of it, Alias stays behind the boards and Tarsier behind the mic, resulting in the most enjoyable music to which the producer's name has ever been attached." Meanwhile, Cameron MacDonald of XLR8R said, "no matter how many tricks Alias has up his sleeve, Tarsier's lullaby voice is not strong enough to carry this record." Marisa Brown of AllMusic gave the album 3.5 stars out of 5, saying: "The album is so close to being fantastic, and knowing the potential that exists is what makes it so frustrating when Brookland/Oaklyn comes up short."

== Track listing ==
No.	Title	Length
1.	"Cub"	4:21
2.	"Rising Sun"	4:40
3.	"Last Nail"	4:54
4.	"Dr. C"	4:33
5.	"Anon"	5:07
6.	"5 Year Eve"	4:41
7.	"Plane That Draws a White Line"	3:59
8.	"Luck and Fear"	4:23
9.	"Picking the Same Lock"	5:54
10.	"Ligaya"	5:27

== Personnel ==
Credits adapted from liner notes.

- Alias – vocals (3), instruments, production, arrangement, recording, mixing, photography
- Tarsier – vocals, piano (1, 3), bass organ (5), synthesizer (8), effects (8), photography
- Telephone Jim Jesus – guitar (4)
- Matt McCullough – guitar (5, 9), effects (5, 9)
- Kirsten McCord – cello (6)
- Doseone – vocals (8)
- Healamonster – synthesizer (8), effects (8)
- Dax Pierson – organ (9)
- Mitch Osias – vocal recording
- George Horn – mastering
- Baillie Parker – executive production
- Wes Winship – artwork, layout
