= Deep Puddle Dynamics =

American hip-hop group

- Origin: Oakland, California; Minneapolis, Minnesota
- Genre: Underground hip-hop
- Years active: 1998–2000
- Label: Anticon
- Members: Sole; Doseone; Alias; Slug

Deep Puddle Dynamics was a collaborative group featuring underground hip-hop artists Sole, Doseone, Alias and Slug.

== History ==
Deep Puddle Dynamics released the album The Taste of Rain... Why Kneel? on Anticon in 1999.

== Discography ==
=== Albums ===
- The Taste of Rain... Why Kneel (1999)

=== EPs ===
- We Ain't Fessin' (Double Quotes) (2002)

=== Singles ===
- "Rainmen" (1999)

=== Compilation appearances ===
- "Rainmen" on Music for the Advancement of Hip Hop (1999)
- "Mothers of Invention" on Anticon Label Sampler: 1999–2004 (2004)
