= Spoken word album =

Recorded predecessor of audiobooks

A spoken word album is a recording of spoken material, a predecessor of the contemporary audiobook genre. Rather than featuring music or songs, the content of spoken word albums include political speeches, dramatic readings of historical documents, dialogue from a film soundtrack, dramatized versions of literary classics, stories for children, comedic material, and instructional recordings. The Grammy for Best Spoken Word Album has been awarded annually since 1959.

== Early beginnings ==
Spoken word albums have been made since the early days of recording; examples include the popular Ronald Colman 1941 version of Charles Dickens' A Christmas Carol on American Decca Records. However, a true milestone was reached when Columbia Masterworks, which had previously released an album of excerpts from Shakespeare's Richard II with Maurice Evans, made a complete recording of Margaret Webster's famed (and never filmed) 1943 Broadway production of Othello, starring Paul Robeson, José Ferrer, and Uta Hagen, on an 18-record 78-RPM set running a total of two hours and eight minutes. It was later transferred to LP. It was the longest spoken word album made up to that time. The album gave millions of listeners who otherwise were unable to attend a theatrical performance a chance to hear Robeson as Othello and Ferrer as Iago.

== LP influence and educational value ==
After the advent of LPs, spoken word albums became much more common.

- The above-mentioned Ronald Colman A Christmas Carol was transferred to LP, as were many other 78-RPM spoken word albums made by American Decca, such as Moby Dick, with Charles Laughton as Captain Ahab; an uncredited actor provided the voice of Ishmael, the narrator.
- Disneyland Records issued many spoken word albums for children, including narrated adaptations of the Disney films in their "Disneyland Storyteller" series.
- Notable Broadway productions, such as Don Juan in Hell (1950, with Charles Boyer, Charles Laughton, Cedric Hardwicke and Agnes Moorehead), the 1953 dramatized reading of the poem John Brown's Body (with Tyrone Power, Judith Anderson, and Raymond Massey), the original 1962 Broadway version of Who's Afraid of Virginia Woolf? (with Uta Hagen, Arthur Hill, George Grizzard and Melinda Dillon), and Richard Burton's Broadway production of Hamlet (1964), were all recorded complete with their original casts by Columbia Masterworks.
- José Ferrer was heard in an album of excerpts from Cyrano de Bergerac, with members of the cast of the 1946 Broadway revival in which Ferrer first played Cyrano, on Capitol Records.
- Caedmon Records recorded the complete plays of Shakespeare as well as recordings of other plays, such as Death of a Salesman with original stars Lee J. Cobb and Mildred Dunnock, The Glass Menagerie with Jessica Tandy, and a nearly complete Cyrano de Bergerac with Ralph Richardson, who had triumphed in the role in London in 1946. Many of these recorded dramas were played in high school literature classes to enable students to hear the play and follow along in their textbooks at the same time.
- After the assassination of President John F. Kennedy in 1963, memorial collections of his speeches began to appear on LP. Most of the soundtrack of the commemorative documentary John F. Kennedy: Years of Lightning, Day of Drums (1966), narrated by Gregory Peck, was released on a Capitol Records LP.
- Dialogue excerpts were also released of the film soundtracks of Franco Zeffirelli's The Taming of the Shrew (1967) (on RCA Victor), and Romeo and Juliet (1968) (on Capitol). RCA Victor also released a virtually complete 2-LP album of the film soundtrack of A Man for All Seasons (1966). RCA Victor was also responsible for complete 4-LP album sets of Laurence Olivier as Othello and Zeffirelli's National Theatre of Great Britain production of Much Ado About Nothing, starring Maggie Smith, Robert Stephens, and Albert Finney.
- Emlyn Williams recorded an edition of his one-man performance as Charles Dickens (for Argo Records).
- Hal Holbrook recorded excerpts from his one-man Mark Twain Tonight! for Columbia Masterworks.
- Having Fun with Elvis on Stage (1974), a spoken word album consisting only of banter by the singer during concerts, was created as a ploy by his manager, Colonel Tom Parker, so he could self-release an Elvis Presley album that his label RCA Records would not own the rights to.

== Decline ==
With the advent of videocassettes and compact discs, however, original cast albums of non-musical plays, as well as spoken word albums of film soundtracks, went into a serious decline from which they have never completely recovered. CDs usually place more emphasis on music than on the spoken word, and there was little interest in only listening to a play or dialogue excerpts from a film when one could now buy plays and films on video and watch them at home whenever one wished. While the Cosby albums have resurfaced on CD, most of the other albums mentioned above have not. (Some of the Caedmon albums have been released on CD by Harper Audio, a division of HarperCollins, which now owns Caedmon.) The 1968 album of Romeo and Juliet excerpts has also appeared on CD, and Pearl has issued the Robeson Othello in that medium, but the CD edition of the Othello has, unfortunately, attracted little attention in comparison to the history-making vinyl record release of the 1940s, and now that Cyrano de Bergerac, A Man for All Seasons, the Olivier Othello, the Zeffirelli versions of Romeo and Juliet and The Taming of the Shrew, the television version of Mark Twain Tonight, and Richard Burton's Hamlet are all available on DVD, this has become for most a more preferred way to experience these productions.

Although Naxos Records is a major producer of audiobooks, many famous spoken word recordings of the past, such as Columbia Masterworks' John Brown's Body and Don Juan in Hell have yet to be released on CD, although Don Juan in Hell has become available as an mp3 download. Whether or not it will appear in CD form is still unknown. Also online (but not yet on CD) is Capitol Records' The Story Teller: A Session with Charles Laughton, a Grammy-winning one-man stage performance by the actor, featuring dramatic readings from the Bible, Shakespeare, George Bernard Shaw and Jack Kerouac, as well as autobiographical reminiscences.

== Today's spoken word albums ==
There have been some spoken word albums over the past 15 years or so recorded specifically for compact disk; these have often been combined with classical music. Among them are the Naxos audiobooks, as well as a Chandos Records series of albums which combine the music William Walton wrote for several Shakespeare production (including the Olivier film adaptations), with readings from the author performed by such actors as John Gielgud and Christopher Plummer. There is also a Hyperion Records stereophonic re-creation of Ralph Vaughan Williams' 1942 radio play adaptation of The Pilgrim's Progress, again with Gielgud. Excerpts from Gielgud's Grammy-winning one-man Shakespeare production Ages of Man (1959), once available on LP, are now available as a manufactured-on-demand CD.

Today, such websites as BBC, L.A. Theatre Works, The Hollywood Theater of the Ear, and ZBS offer full-length recordings on CD of their dramatic productions. These recordings are possibly the closest that modern day discs have come to the spoken word albums of the 1960s.
