= 13 & God =

American indie hip-hop group

- Origin: California, United States; Weilheim in Oberbayern, Germany
- Genres: Alternative hip-hop, electronica, trip hop, indie rock
- Years active: 2003–present
- Labels: Anticon, Alien Transistor
- Members: Doseone; Jel; Dax Pierson; Jordan Dalrymple; Markus Acher; Micha Acher; Martin Gretschmann

13 & God is a collaboration between American indie hip-hop duo Themselves and German indie rock band The Notwist. The group is signed both to Anticon and Alien Transistor.

== History ==
13 & God are joined live by Jordan Dalrymple, who now plays Dax Pierson's parts following a 2005 Subtle tour accident which left Dax quadriplegic. As of 2010, Jordan has officially joined, and has been contributing in the studio.

In a 2009 interview with Pitchfork, Doseone said, "in 2010 there will be a brand new shiny 13 & G record out in the world." On February 3, 2011, the second album, Own Your Ghost, was announced to be released on Anticon on May 17, 2011. The album features ten tracks, including "Sure As Debt", which is a song written and performed on the 2007 tour. This announcement was accompanied by a preview clip of the song "Armored Scarves" from the album.

== Discography ==
=== Albums ===
- 13 & God (Anticon/Alien Transistor, 2005)
- Own Your Ghost (Anticon/Alien Transistor, 2011)

=== Singles ===
- "Men of Station" (2005)
- "Oldage" (2011)

=== Live albums ===
- Live in Japan (2008)

=== Remixes ===
- Themselves - "Daxstrong" from CrownsDown & Company (2010)
