= Themselves =

American hip-hop group

- Also known as: Them
- Origin: Oakland, California
- Genre: Hip-hop
- Years active: 1998–present
- Label: Anticon
- Members: Doseone; Jel

Themselves, previously known as Them, is an American hip-hop duo based in Oakland, California. It consists of Doseone and Jel. They are also part of Subtle and 13 & God. The duo's first studio album, Them, was included on Fact's "100 Best Indie Hip-Hop Records of All Time" list.

== History ==
Doseone and Jel met through Mr. Dibbs and formed Themselves. Then known as Them, the duo's first studio album, Them, was released in 2000. The group changed their name to Themselves in 2001, and a year later released their second studio album, The No Music. A remix album, The No Music of AIFFs, was released in 2003. In 2009, Themselves released a mixtape, The Free Houdini, as well as the third studio album, Crowns Down. Another remix album, Crowns Down & Company, was released in 2010.

== Members ==
- Doseone – vocals, production
- Jel – vocals, production

== Discography ==
Studio albums

- Outer Perimeter (with Mr. Dibbs as Presage, 1998)
- Them (2000)
- The No Music (2002)
- Crowns Down (2009)

Mixtapes

- The Free Houdini (2009)

Remix albums

- The No Music of AIFFs (2003)
- Crowns Down & Company (2010)

Live albums

- Live (2003)
- Live II (2005)

Singles

- "Joyful Toy of 1001 Faces" (1999)
- "This About the City Too" (2002)
- "P.U.S.H." (2004)

Compilation appearances

- "It's Them" on Music for the Advancement of Hip Hop (1999)
- "Them's My Peoples" on A Piece of the Action (2001)
- "My Way Out of a Paper Bag" on Giga Single (2001)
- "This About the City Too" on Urban Renewal Program (2002)
- "Dark Sky Demo", "Poison Pit", "It's Them" and "Good People Check (Hrvatski Remix)" on Anticon Label Sampler: 1999-2004 (2004)
- "Take to the King" on African Jag Vol. 1 (2006)
