= Doseone =

American rapper (born 1977)

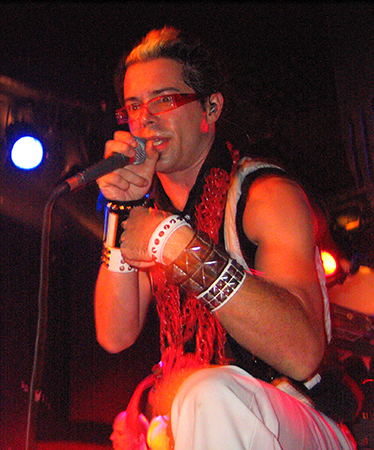
- Doseone in 2006

Background information
- Born: Adam Kidd Drucker; April 21, 1977 (age 49); Nampa, Idaho, U.S.
- Origin: Ohio, U.S.
- Genres: Alternative hip-hop; indie rock
- Occupations: Rapper; singer; producer
- Instruments: Vocals; sampler; synthesizer; keyboard
- Years active: 1997–present
- Labels: Anticon; Mush Records; Big Dada; Lex Records; Alien Transistor
- Member of: 13 & God; A7pha; Go Dark; Themselves; Nevermen
- Formerly of: Deep Puddle Dynamics; Clouddead; Subtle; Greenthink
- Website: www.anticon.com

Adam Kidd Drucker (born April 21, 1977), better known by his stage name Doseone, is an American rapper, producer, poet and artist. He is a co-founder of the indie hip-hop record label Anticon. He has also been a member of numerous groups including Deep Puddle Dynamics, A7pha, Greenthink, Clouddead, Themselves, Subtle, 13 & God, Go Dark, and Nevermen.

== History ==
Doseone was born Adam Kidd Drucker in Nampa, Idaho, on April 21, 1977. He is known for his extensive collaborations with other Anticon members, forming numerous groups and performing guest spots on others' releases. He has recorded with many musicians including Mr. Dibbs, Aesop Rock, Slug, Sole, Alias, Jel, Odd Nosdam, Why?, Fog, Boom Bip, The Notwist, and Mike Patton. He has also released several solo albums, including the spoken word album Soft Skulls and a combination audio CD and poetry book The Pelt.

Early in his musical career, Doseone once competed in a freestyle rap battle with then-unknown Eminem at Scribble Jam in 1997. In 1998, Doseone released his first solo album, Hemispheres. In 2000, he released Circle, a collaborative album with producer Boom Bip. In 2012, he released the solo album, G Is for Deep, on Anticon.

Doseone is also a visual artist. He has worked on the cover art for many of the albums he has performed on. He has also done work in animation. He worked on an online animated cartoon NOTGarfield. The series consists of characters from Garfield involved in surreal dada situations. Doseone (as Adam Drucker) has contributed to multiple Meow Wolf projects.

In January 2012 it was announced that Adult Swim had ordered a pilot of an animated series called Mars Safari featuring a soundtrack by Doseone and Jel.

Doseone is also a prominent composer for indie games, most notably those published by Devolver Digital. Those include Sludge Life, Samurai Gunn, Catacomb Kids, Enter the Gungeon, Gang Beasts, Vlambeer's games Gun Godz and Nuclear Throne, Messhof's Nidhogg 2; he also served as a co-developer on Disc Room and High Hell.

== Style ==
Doseone is known for his nasal and high pitched voice, fast polyrhythmic rapping style, and extremely dense and abstract lyrics. His words tend to express upon topics of childhood, nature, and American life. While rapping/singing onstage, he often also simultaneously performs on the synthesizer, sampler, or keyboard.

A recurring character in much of Doseone's work is a man named Hour Hero Yes. He is mentioned in the 13 & God song "Ghostwork" as well as throughout albums of his band Subtle. Album and video artwork, as well as art on Subtle's official website, suggest Hour Hero Yes to be a bald man with a black and white striped face, an image which is embodied by a bust that serves as a centerpiece prop during live Subtle shows. On the cover of For Hero: For Fool, he appears in old military garb with fire for hair.

== Discography ==
=== Studio albums ===
- Hemispheres (1998)
- It's Not Easy Being... (1998) (with Why? as Greenthink)
- Blindfold (1999) (Greenthink)
- Slowdeath (1999)
- Circle (2000) (with Boom Bip)
- cLOUDDEAD (2001) (with Why? and Odd Nosdam)
- Object Beings (2001) (with Why? & Pedestrian as Object Beings)
- Ha (2005)
- Soft Skulls (2007)
- Skeleton Repelent (2007)
- G Is for Deep (2012)
- A7pha (2017) (with Mestizo as A7pha)
- Less Is Orchestra (2018) (with Alias)
- G is for JOB (2020)
- A7pha II (2022) (with Mestizo as A7pha)
- North American Adonis (2023) (with Buck 65 and Jel as North American Adonis)
- All Portrait, No Chorus (2025) (with Steel Tipped Dove)

=== Live albums ===
- Apogee (1997) (with Why?, Josiah & Mr. Dibbs, as Apogee)
- Be Evil (2009)

=== EPs ===
- Crazy Hitman Science (1999) (with Jel, Why?, et al., as Blud N Gutz)
- The Samurai Gunn (2013)
- Free Ring Tone of the Month Vol. I (2013)
- Bitchsword (2014) (with Ash, as Go Dark)
- Heavy Bullets (2014)
- Free Ring Tone of the Month Vol. II (2014)
- Brightwild (2015) (Go Dark)
- Hunt Me (2016) (Go Dark)
- Even with Demons (2023)

=== Singles ===
- "Attack of the Postmodern Pat Boones / Cannibalism of the Object Beings" (2000) (Object Beings)

=== Audio books ===
- The Pelt (2003)
- Unearthing (2010) (with Andrew Broder, as Crook & Flail)

=== Collaborations ===
- "How U Feelin?" (with Peeping Tom, 2006)

=== Video games ===
- Samurai Gunn (2013)
- Heavy Bullets (2014)
- Super Game Jam: Soundtrack (2014) (with Kuabee)
- 0rbitalis: Soundtrack (2015)
- Enter the Gungeon: Soundtrack (2016)
- Disc Room: Soundtrack (2016)
- SLUDGE LIFE (Original SoundTrack) (2020)
- Escape Academy (Original SoundTrack) (2022)
- SLUDGE LIFE 2 (Original SoundTrack) (2023)
