= Yoni Wolf discography =

Yoni Wolf (formerly known by his stage name Why?) is an American alternative hip hop and indie rock artist based in Berkeley, California. He is the lead vocalist of the band Why?, which was formed in 2004 and to whom he transferred his solo moniker. His discography, spread across various groups and projects, consists of eighteen studio albums, eight EPs, three compilations of demos, one compilation album, four live albums, numerous physical singles, and many production and remix credits and guest appearances on other artists' tracks.

== Albums ==
=== Solo ===
- Part Time People Cage... or Part Time Key? (1999) (as Why?)
- Oaklandazulasylum (2003) (as Why?)

=== Why? ===
- Elephant Eyelash (2005)
- Alopecia (2008)
- Eskimo Snow (2009)
- Mumps, Etc. (2012)
- Moh Lhean (2017)
- AOKOHIO (2019)
- The Well I Fell Into (2024)

=== Clouddead (Yoni Wolf with Doseone & Odd Nosdam) ===
- Clouddead (2001)
- Ten (2004)

=== Greenthink (Yoni Wolf with Doseone) ===
- It's Not Easy Being... (1998)
- Blindfold (1999)

=== Other collaborations ===
- Object Beings (2001) (with Doseone & Pedestrian, as Object Beings)
- In the Shadow of the Living Room (2002) (with Odd Nosdam, as Reaching Quiet)
- Hymie's Basement (2003) (with Andrew Broder, as Hymie's Basement)
- Divorcee (2014) (with Anna Stewart, as Divorcee)
- Testarossa (2016) (with Serengeti)

== EPs ==
- Crazy Hitman Science (1999) (with Doseone, Jel, et al., as Blud N Gutz)
- Split EP! (2001) (as Why?, with Odd Nosdam)
- Miss Ohio's Nameless (2001) (with Odd Nosdam, Doug McDiarmid, Chris Messick & John Meinkin, as Miss Ohio's Nameless)
- The Peel Session (2001) (Clouddead)
- Early Whitney (2003) (as Why?)
- Sanddollars (2005) (with Why?)
- Rubber Traits EP (2006) (with Why?)
- Sod in the Seed (2012) (with Why?)

== Mixtapes ==
- Old Dope (Rap Tape) (2014)
- Snowjams (Covers Tape) (2014)

== Demo albums ==
- Alopecia: The Demos!! (2008) (with Why?)
- Eskimo Snow Demos (2009) (with Why?)
- Mumps, Etc. Etc.: The Demos 2007-2011 (2012) (with Why?)

== Live albums ==
- Apogee (1997) (with Doseone, Josiah & Mr. Dibbs, as Apogee)
- Almost Live from Anna’s Cabin (2003) (as Why?)
- Hymie's Basement Live (2004) (Hymie's Basement)
- Almost Live from Eli's Room (2008) (with Why?)
- Live at Third Man Records (2018)

== Singles ==
- "Attack of the Postmodern Pat Boones / Cannibalism of the Object Beings" (2000) (Object Beings)
- "Apt. A" (2000) (Clouddead)
- "And All You Can Do Is Laugh" (2000) (Clouddead)
- "I Promise Never to Get Paint on My Glasses Again" (2001) (Clouddead)
- "Jimmy Breeze" (2001) (Clouddead)
- "Cloud Dead Number Five" (2001) (Clouddead)
- "Bike" (2001) (Clouddead)
- "So Long, Mike Pt. 1 / Black Light District" (2001) (with Odd Nosdam, as MadToons Beat Orchestra)
- "The Sound of a Handshake / This About the City" (2002) (Clouddead)
- "Dead Dogs Two" (2004) (Clouddead)
- "Dumb Hummer" (2006) (with Why?)
- "The Hollows" (2007) (with Why?)

== Guest appearances ==
- Sole - "Center City" from Bottle of Humans (2000)
- Reaching Quiet - "113th Clean" on Ropeladder 12 (2000)
- Hood - "They Removed All Trace That Anything Had Ever Happened Here", "Branches Bare" & "You're Worth The Whole World" from Cold House (2001)
- DJ Krush - "Song for John Walker" from The Message at the Depth (2002)
- Pedestrian - "O Hosanna" "Lifelong Liquidation Sale (1850-1950)" "The Dead Of A Day" "Anticon." "Jane 2: Electric Boogaloo" from Volume One: UnIndian Songs (2005)
- 13 & God - "Soft Atlas" from 13 & God (2005)
- Jel - "All Day Breakfast" from Soft Money (2006)
- Subtle - "Falling" from Yell & Ice (2007)
- Xiu Xiu - "The Wig Master" from Remixed & Covered (2007)
- SJ Esau - "Note" from Stop Touching My Cat (2007)
- Alias - "Well Water Black" from Resurgam (2008)
- Cryptacize - "As I Went Out This Morning" from Unusual Animals Vol. 4 (2008)
- Telephone Jim Jesus - "Dice Raw" from Anywhere Out of the Everything (2008)
- Themselves - "Rapping 4 Money" from The Free Houdini (2009)
- Serengeti - "Geti Life" from C.A.R. (2012)
- Ceschi - "Yoni’s Electrocardiographs (feat. Yoni Wolf)" from Sans Soleil (2019)
- Foxing - "Speak With The Dead (feat. WHY?) (2021)

== Remix credits ==
- Fog - "What a Day Day (Remix)" from What a Day Day (2003)
- Themselves - "Poison Pit (remix)" from The No Music of AIFFs (2003)
- 13 & God - "Into The Trees (Remix)" from "Men of Station" (2005)
- Thee More Shallows - "Freshman Remix" from Monkey vs. Shark (2006)
- Bracken - "Heathens (Redone by Alias And Why?)" from "Heathens" (2006)
