= Sanddollars =

EP by Why?
- Released: May 9, 2005
- Genre: Indie rock
- Length: 20:36
- Label: Anticon

Why? chronology
Oaklandazulasylum (2003)	Sanddollars (2005)	Elephant Eyelash (2005)

Professional ratings
Aggregate scores
Source	Rating
Metacritic	80/100
Review scores
Source	Rating
Cokemachineglow	79/100
No Ripchord	7/10
Pitchfork	6.6/10
Playlouder	4/5 stars

Sanddollars is the debut EP by American band Why?. It was released by Anticon on May 9, 2005. It is the band's first release, having been formed in 2004; prior to this, the name 'Why?' had been used by Yoni Wolf as his stage name for his solo work.

== Critical reception ==
At Metacritic, which assigns a weighted average score out of 100 to reviews from mainstream critics, Sanddollars received an average score of 80% based on 10 reviews, indicating "generally favorable reviews".

== Track listing ==
No.	Title	Length
1.	"Miss Ohio's Nameless"	2:54
2.	"500 Fingernails"	2:28
3.	"Sick 2 Think"	1:58
4.	"Sanddollars"	3:10
5.	"Vice Principal"	1:31
6.	"Next Atlanta"	1:49
7.	"Pantone Cyan"	3:15
8.	"Mutant John"	3:26

== Personnel ==
Credits adapted from liner notes.

- Yoni Wolf – music, layout
- Josiah Wolf – music
- Doug McDiarmid – music
- Matt Meldon – music
- John Ringhofer – trombone (1, 7)
- Doseone – vocals (4)
- Kim Contreras – vocals (4)
- Anna Stewart – vocals (7)
- Tony Espinoza – mixing
- Brian Gardner – mastering
- Jessica Miller – photography
- Odd Nosdam – layout
