= Early Whitney =

The Early Whitney EP

EP by Why?
- Released: October 6, 2003
- Genre: Alternative hip hop, indie rock
- Length: 20:14
- Label: Anticon
- Producer: Jonathan "Yoni" Wolf, Josiah Wolf

Why? chronology
Oaklandazulasylum (2003)	The Early Whitney EP (2003)	Almost Live from Anna's Cabin (2003)

Professional ratings
Review scores
Source	Rating
No Ripchord	(9/10)
Tiny Mix Tapes	4.5/5 stars

Early Whitney is an EP by American hip hop artist Why?. It was released by Anticon on October 6, 2003, four months after Why?'s second studio album Oaklandazulasylum.

It is named after the song of the same name from Oaklandazulasylum, which is also included on the EP itself. It also contains several songs that later appeared on the live album Almost Live from Anna's Cabin.

It is the final solo release on which Yoni Wolf would use the stage name 'Why?', transferring it onto his newly founded band in 2004.

== Track listing ==
No.	Title	Writer(s)	Producer(s)	Length
1.	"Early Whitney"	Yoni Wolf	Yoni Wolf	4:03
2.	"Ladyfingerz"	Yoni Wolf, Josiah Wolf	Yoni Wolf, Josiah Wolf	3:19
3.	"Point Blank"	Yoni Wolf	Yoni Wolf	2:23
4.	"Darla"	Yoni Wolf, Josiah Wolf	Yoni Wolf, Josiah Wolf	3:07
5.	"Me on Beer"	Yoni Wolf	Yoni Wolf	1:45
6.	"The Crest"	Yoni Wolf, Josiah Wolf	Yoni Wolf, Josiah Wolf	5:32
