= AOKOHIO =

Studio album by Why?
- Released: August 9, 2019
- Genre: Indie rock
- Length: 42:14
- Label: Joyful Noise
- Producer: Yoni Wolf; Josiah Wolf

Why? chronology
Moh Lhean (2017)	AOKOHIO (2019)	The Well I Fell Into (2024)

AOKOHIO is the seventh studio album by American band Why?. It was released by Joyful Noise Recordings on August 9, 2019. It was released with an accompanying visual album.

AOKOHIO received a 67/100 on Metacritic, signifying generally favorable reviews. Pitchfork rated the album 5.3/10, describing it as overly experimental and lacking the appeal of Why?'s early albums.

== Track listing ==
No.	Title	Length
1.	"Apogee"	1:45
2.	"The Rash"	0:45
3.	"Peel Free"	4:44
4.	"Reason" (featuring Lala Lala)	1:40
5.	"Deleterio Motilis"	1:52
6.	"Stained Glass Slipper"	2:24
7.	"The Launch"	1:08
8.	"High Dive"	1:25
9.	"Mr. Fifths' Plea"	0:46
10.	"Good Fire"	1:22
11.	"Narcissistic Lamentation"	0:42
12.	"Krevin'"	1:32
13.	"The Crippled Physician" (featuring Lala Lala and Gia Margaret)	2:55
14.	"Ustekinumab"	0:31
15.	"My Original"	0:31
16.	"Rock Candy"	2:19
17.	"Once Shy"	1:08
18.	"The Shame"	0:35
19.	"Bloom Wither Bloom (for Mom)" (featuring Christian Lee Hutson and Gabby's World)	4:10
Total length:		32:14

== Personnel ==
Credits adapted from Tidal.

Why?

- Yoni Wolf – vocals, bass, drums, piano, sampling, producer, engineer, mixing, artwork
- Doug McDiarmid – bass, cuts, piano, synthesizer, engineer
- Matt Meldon – guitar, sounds
- Josiah Wolf – drums, bass samples, guitar, percussion, piano, sampling, producer, engineer, mixing

Additional personnel

- Grace Weir – cello, artwork
- Kate Wakefield – cello
- David McDonnell – contrabass clarinet, contra-alto clarinet, saxophone, engineer, artwork
- Andrew Broder – cuts, sampling, synthesizer
- Joe Westerlund – drums
- Nick Sanborn – drums, sampling, engineer
- Jonnie Walker – guitar, sampling, saxophone, synthesizer
- Miles Joris-Peyrafitte – sampling
- Stephen Gurewitz – sampling
- Adam Schatz – saxophone, engineer
- Peter Foley – synthesizer, engineer
- Collin Thompson – trombone
- Ofir Klemperer – trombone
- Claire Whitcomb – viola, violin
- Becky Wolf – vocals
- Christian Lee Hutson – vocals
- David Cohn – vocals, engineer
- Felix Walworth – vocals
- Gabby Smith – vocals, engineer
- Gia Margaret – vocals
- Lillie West – vocals, engineer
- Liz Wolf – vocals
- Marty Mars – vocals, mixing
- Oliver Kalb – vocals, engineer
- Pete Lyman – mastering, engineer
- Josh Berg – mixing
- Dave Vettraino – engineer
- Marshall Vore – engineer
- Nicholas Papaleo – engineer
- David Woodruff – artwork
