= The Well I Fell Into =

Studio album by Why?
- Released: August 2, 2024
- Studio: Hive, Eau Claire, Wisconsin
- Genre: Indie rock
- Length: 45:15
- Label: Waterlines
- Producer: Brian Joseph; Josiah Wolf; Yoni Wolf

Why? chronology
AOKOHIO (2019)	The Well I Fell Into (2024)

The Well I Fell Into is the eighth studio album by American indie rock band Why?. It was released on August 2, 2024 via Waterlines. The main recording sessions took place at Hive in Eau Claire, Wisconsin. Production was handled by Yoni Wolf, Josiah Wolf and Brian Joseph, with Andrew Broder, Doug McDiarmid and Josh Berg serving as co-producers.

== Critical reception ==
Professional ratings
Aggregate scores
Source	Rating
Metacritic	76/100
Review scores
Source	Rating
AllMusic	3.5/5 stars
Far Out	3/5 stars
Paste	6.9/10
PopMatters	7/10
Spectrum Culture	75/100%
The Arts Desk	5/5 stars
Under the Radar	7/10 stars

The Well I Fell Into was met with generally favorable reviews from music critics. At Metacritic, which assigns a normalized rating out of 100 to reviews from mainstream publications, the album received an average score of 76 based on five reviews.

Joe Muggs of The Arts Desk praised the album, claiming: "it's super grand in its scope, expanding out in all directions from a hodge-podge of leftfield and psychedelic influences". Holly Hazelwood of Spectrum Culture wrote: "far from the most sonically interesting record in the WHY? oeuvre, The Well I Fell Into is for anyone eager to watch their favorite art weirdo heroes get older and grow". AllMusic's Marcy Donelson resumed: "disconsolate, intricately produced, and surprisingly varied, all things considered, The Well I Fell Into should appeal to sympathetic fans as well as the less-folky sad-song set". Brian Stout of PopMatters concluded: "the lyrics are heavy, but they are supported by some of the prettiest arrangements Why? have recorded to date". Austin Trunick of Under the Radar stated: "overall the record's more laid back than WHY?'s late-'00s classics, but Wolf's wordplay alone will give fans a lot to unpack for the foreseeable future". Josh Korngut of Paste found the album "respectfully showcases the cozy cottage WHY? has built for themselves at the top of the mountain".

In his mixed review for Far Out, Tom Taylor wrote: "as you settle into the fact that the record feels a little crass and the songwriting is riddled with dated sentiments that hark back to Wolf's early days as an artist, the truly astounding production drags you back into objective praise and away from subjective questions about artfulness".

== Track listing ==
All tracks are written by Jonathan Wolf.

No.	Title	Length
1.	"Lauderdale Detour"	0:39
2.	"Marigold"	3:28
3.	"Brand New"	3:23
4.	"G-Dzillah G'dolah"	3:25
5.	"When We Do the Dance"	2:38
6.	"Jump"	3:28
7.	"Later at the Loon"	3:38
8.	"Nis(s)an Dreams, Pt. 1"	3:28
9.	"The Letters, Etc."	3:49
10.	"What's Me?"	2:35
11.	"Sin Imperial"	4:10
12.	"Atreyu"	2:56
13.	"Versa Go!"	4:32
14.	"Sending Out a Pamphlet"	3:06
Total length:		45:15

== Personnel ==
Why?

- Jonathan "Yoni" Wolf – producer, mixing, executive producer, artwork
- Josiah Wolf – producer
- Andrew Broder – co-producer
- Doug McDiarmid – co-producer

Additional musicians

- Gia Margaret – vocals, guitar, synths
- Mol Sullivan – vocals
- Brooklynn Rae – vocals
- Lillie "Lala Lala" West – vocals
- Jessica "Montaigne" Cerro – vocals
- Alexandra "Ada Lea" Levy – vocals
- Marty Mars – vocals
- David "Serengeti" Cohn – vocals
- Stephen Patota – guitars
- Jeremy Boettcher – double bass
- Emily Hope Price – cello
- Macie Stewart – violin, viola
- Adam Schatz – woodwinds, effects
- Uncle Harry – vocal samples
- Brian Joseph – producer, recording
- Josh Berg – co-producer, mixing
- Pete Lyman – mastering
- Heather Rametta – artwork
- Scott Fredette – additional photography
- Rachel Rubin Wolf – painting
