= Hood (band) =

English indie rock band

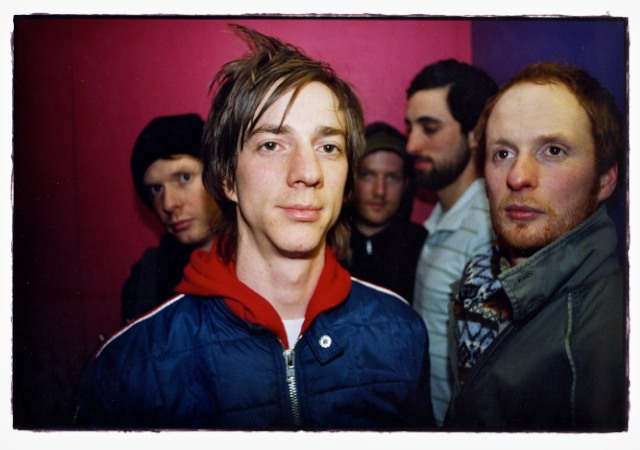

Background information
- Origin: Leeds, England
- Genres: Post-rock; indie rock; indietronica
- Years active: 1991–2005 (on hiatus)
- Labels: Domino Records, Misplaced Music, Slumberland Records, Happy Go Lucky Records, Fluff Records, 555 Recordings
- Members: Chris Adams; Richard Adams
- Past members: John Clyde-Evans; Nicola Hodgkinson; Andrew Johnson; Stephen Royle; Craig Tattersall; Gareth S. Brown; Mark Wright; Stewart Anderson; Matt Robson

Hood are an English post-rock band from Wetherby, formed in 1990. The band consists of brothers Chris and Richard Adams, and friends (including, at times, Craig Tattersall and Andrew Johnson of The Remote Viewer, and Nicola Hodgkinson of Empress).

== History ==
Hood's first releases were limited vinyl singles issued on various small independent record labels.

In 1994, record labels Fluff and Slumberland Records released Hood's first full-length album, Cabled Linear Traction. Slumberland also released 1996's Silent '88, and the following year Happy Go Lucky Records released Structured Disasters, a compilation of tracks from singles. Most of these releases featured a large number of short tracks (many being less than a minute), stylistically a mixture of indie rock, noise experiments, and an increasing interest in electronics.

In 1997, Domino Records signed Hood and released the single "Useless". Produced by Matt Elliott (better known as the Third Eye Foundation), the single marked a turn towards longer-form songwriting for the band, and was markedly more conventional than most of their material preceding it. Elliott toured with the band, and produced the albums Rustic Houses, Forlorn Valleys and The Cycle of Days and Seasons. Like "Useless", these releases continued the shift away from short songs and instrumental snippets in favor of longer pieces, with a more atmospheric sound similar to Bark Psychosis or Talk Talk. The band continued to release singles for other labels; "The Weight", for 555 Recordings, was a return to the older style with eight tracks on a 7" disc.

Collaborating with Doseone and Why? from the Anticon collective, Hood released their fifth album, Cold House in 2001. The work combined elements of post-rock, IDM, and indie, and featured the single/promotional EP "You Show No Emotion at All".

In 2003, most of the band's single and compilation tracks from the years since Structured Disasters were collected on the compilation albums Singles Compiled and Compilations 1995-2002. Neither album contains any of the tracks recorded for Domino, but some previously unheard and unreleased material is included on them.

In early 2005, after additional line-up changes, Hood released Outside Closer. The tracks "The Lost You" and "The Negatives" were released as singles.

Following the release of Outside Closer, Hood toured with Why? to promote his album Elephant Eyelash and released various remixes, including 'The Negatives' with vocals by British MC Jehst. Chris Adams also formed the solo side project Bracken, and in 2007 released the album We Know About the Need on Anticon.

In 2007, Richard Adams formed the side project The Declining Winter, releasing a 7" single, The Future Sound of Hip Hop Parts 1 & 2, and an album, Goodbye Minnesota and further albums on a variety of labels.

In 2011, Domino Records released the six-disc compilation box set Recollected to celebrate the 10th anniversary of the release of Cold House. The compilation comprises the four studio albums the band released with Domino, as well as two extra discs that respectively comprise songs from EPs and singles released during the Domino era, and the 2005 compilation The Hood Tapes, .

== Discography ==
=== Studio albums ===
- Cabled Linear Traction (1994)
- Silent '88 (1996)
- Rustic Houses, Forlorn Valleys (1998)
- The Cycle of Days and Seasons (1999)
- Cold House (2001)
- Outside Closer (2005)

=== Compilation albums ===
- Structured Disasters (1997)
- Compilations 1995-2002 (2003)
- Singles Compiled (2003)
- The Hood Tapes (2005)
- Recollected (2011)

=== Singles ===
- "Sirens" (1992)
- "Opening into Enclosure" (1993)
- "57 White Bread" (1994)
- "Carmine" (split) (1995)
- "A Harbour of Thoughts" (1995)
- "Hem" (split) (1995)
- "Lee Faust's Million Piece Orchestra" (1995)
- "I've Forgotten How to Live" (1996)
- "Secrets Now Known to Others" (Earworm Records, 1996)
- "Useless"' (1997)
- "Filmed Initiative" (1998)
- "The Year of Occasional Lull" (1998)
- "(The) Weight" (1998)
- "Steward" (split) (2000)
- "Home is Where it Hurts" (2001)
- "Photographers" (2001)
- "You Show No Emotion at All" (2002)
- "Themselves" (split) (2004)
- "The Lost You" (2004)
- "The Negatives" (2005)
