= Philip Banks =

Philip Banks may refer to:

- Philip Banks III (born 1962), former Chief of the New York Police Department
- Philip Norton Banks (1889–1964), British colonial police officer
- Philip Banks (The Fresh Prince of Bel-Air), fictional character
- Phillip Banks, an artist and animator known for creating the Chill Guy character
