= Book of Bad Breaks =

Studio album by Thee More Shallows
- Released: April 24, 2007
- Genre: Indie rock
- Length: 36:34
- Label: Anticon

Thee More Shallows chronology
Monkey vs. Shark (2006)	Book of Bad Breaks (2007)

Professional ratings
Aggregate scores
Source	Rating
Metacritic	69/100
Review scores
Source	Rating
AllMusic	3.5/5 stars
Cokemachineglow	65/100
Cyclic Defrost	favorable
Pitchfork	6.0/10
The Skinny	4/5 stars
Stylus Magazine	C
XLR8R	favorable

Book of Bad Breaks is the third studio album by American indie rock band Thee More Shallows. It was released on Anticon on April 24, 2007.

== Critical reception ==
At Metacritic, which assigns a weighted average score out of 100 to reviews from mainstream critics, the album received an average score of 69% based on 14 reviews, indicating "generally favorable reviews".

Marisa Brown of AllMusic gave the album 3.5 stars out of 5, saying: "There's a fair amount of experimentalism, with plenty of synthesized and effected sounds, songs breaking in and out of themselves from time to time, intermissions that lead into full pieces which then fade halfway through and become something else before returning to what they were originally." Dave Kerr of The Skinny gave the album 4 stars out of 5, saying: "Despite the haunting, downtrodden poetry in these lyrics, optimism and vitality shines brightly throughout the Shallows' sound."

== Track listing ==
No.	Title	Length
1.	"D. Shallow"	0:45
2.	"Eagle Rock"	2:57
3.	"Dutch Fist"	3:26
4.	"Night at the Knight School"	3:23
5.	"Int 1"	1:56
6.	"Proud Turkeys"	3:40
7.	"Int 2"	0:46
8.	"Fly Paper"	3:41
9.	"Int 3"	0:27
10.	"Oh Yes, Another Mother"	3:10
11.	"White Mask"	6:40
12.	"Chrome Caps"	3:55
13.	"Mo Deeper"	1:48
