= Alopecia (disambiguation) =

Alopecia is a synonym for hair loss. In everyday use the term may incorrectly refer specifically to:

- Alopecia areata (spot baldness), where hair is lost from some to almost all areas of the body
- Alopecia universalis, where hair is lost from all areas of the body

== Other ==
- Alopecia (album), a 2008 album by the band Why?
