= Sod in the Seed =

EP by Why?
- Released: August 13, 2012
- Genre: Indie rock
- Length: 16:34
- Label: Anticon; City Slang
- Producer: Josiah Wolf; Yoni Wolf

Why? chronology
| Eskimo Snow (2009) | Sod in the Seed (2012) | Mumps, Etc. (2012) |

Professional ratings
Review scores
| Source | Rating |
|---|---|
| BBC | favorable |
| Consequence of Sound | C− |
| NME | 3.5/5 stars |
| Pitchfork | 5.2/10 |
| The Skinny | 4/5 stars |

Sod in the Seed is an EP by American band Why?. It was released by City Slang in Europe on August 13, 2012, and by Anticon in North America on August 14, 2012. A music video was created for the title track.

== Critical reception ==
Ian Cohen of Pitchfork gave the EP a 5.2 out of 10, describing it as "a regression rather than a rightful claim to what's theirs" that "benefits from the sketch-like character of its remaining songs."

Mike Diver of BBC listed it as one of the six best EPs of 2012.

== Track listing ==
| No. | Title | Length |
|---|---|---|
| 1. | "Sod in the Seed" | 4:43 |
| 2. | "For Someone" | 3:32 |
| 3. | "The Plan" | 2:24 |
| 4. | "Probable Cause" | 1:01 |
| 5. | "Twenty Seven" | 1:45 |
| 6. | "Shag Carpet" | 3:07 |

== Personnel ==
Credits adapted from liner notes.

- Yoni Wolf – music, production, recording, mixing, artwork
- Josiah Wolf – music, production, recording
- Doug McDiarmid – music
- Liz Wolf – vocals
- Stephan Beall – violin, viola
- Brandon Stewart – French horn
- Stephen Carroll – vocals (6)
- Nicholas Garza – vocals (6)
- Amy Golden – vocals (6)
- Nathan Goodrich – vocals (6)
- Megan Hoggarth – vocals (6)
- Brittni Kelly – vocals (6)
- Elizabeth Knight – vocals (6)
- Kevin Bole – engineering assistance
- Justin Collins – engineering assistance
- Michael Earley – engineering assistance
- James Kang – engineering assistance
- Matt Moermond – engineering assistance
- Brent 'Snake' Benedict – recording
- Graham Marsh – mixing
- John Horesco IV – mastering
- Chris Simmons – layout
