= Elephant Eyelash =

Studio album by Why?
- Released: September 26, 2005
- Genre: Indie rock
- Length: 41:02
- Label: Anticon
- Producer: Josiah Wolf; Yoni Wolf

Why? chronology
Sanddollars (2005)	Elephant Eyelash (2005)	Rubber Traits EP (2006)

Professional ratings
Aggregate scores
Source	Rating
Metacritic	76/100
Review scores
Source	Rating
AllMusic	4.5/5 stars
Cokemachineglow	68/100
Exclaim!	favorable
Pitchfork	7.8/10
PopMatters	8/10 stars
Stylus Magazine	D

Elephant Eyelash is the second studio album by American band Why?. It was released by Anticon on September 26, 2005. Prior to the formation of the band in 2004, Yoni Wolf had used "Why?" as his stage name for his solo work. At the release of the album, most considered this the debut Why? album; however in later years, the band counted Oaklandazulasylum as their debut album.

The title refers to an erection. Why? said: "An 'elephant eyelash' is a hard-on. I like to make my own pantheon of slang. Isn't having a hard-on kind of vulnerable? It's an anticipation."

== Critical reception ==
At Metacritic, which assigns a weighted average score out of 100 to reviews from mainstream critics, Elephant Eyelash received an average score of 76% based on 14 reviews, indicating "generally favorable reviews".

Josh Berquist of PopMatters gave the album 8 stars out of 10, calling it "one of the best records released this year."

== Track listing ==
No.	Title	Length
1.	"Crushed Bones"	3:30
2.	"Yo Yo Bye Bye"	2:51
3.	"Rubber Traits"	4:01
4.	"The Hoofs"	1:57
5.	"Fall Saddles"	2:44
6.	"Gemini (Birthday Song)"	5:28
7.	"Waterfalls"	2:50
8.	"Sanddollars"	3:44
9.	"Speech Bubbles"	2:57
10.	"Whispers into the Other"	3:28
11.	"Act Five"	3:20
12.	"Light Leaves"	4:10

== Personnel ==
Credits adapted from the album's liner notes.

- Yoni Wolf – music, production, recording, artwork
- Josiah Wolf – music, production, recording
- Doug McDiarmid – music
- Matt Meldon – music
- Anna Stewart – additional vocals (3)
- John Ringhoffer – trombone (5)
- Dee Kesler – violin (5)
- Doseone – additional vocals (6, 8)
- Jel – drum programming (9)
- Brian Wilson – additional vocals (10)
- Colin Guthrie – recording (1, 12)
- Jud Lee – recording (1, 12)
- Mike Walti – recording (1, 12)
- Tony Espinoza – mixing
- Brian Gardner – mastering
- Odd Nosdam – layout
