= Romantic Piano =

Studio album by Gia Margaret
- Released: May 26, 2023
- Recorded: 2021–2022
- Studio: Bainbridge Island, Washington, United States (field recordings); Chicago, Illinois, United States (field recordings); Evanston, Illinois, United States; Frankfort, Michigan, United States (field recordings)
- Genre: Ambient; indie folk
- Length: 26:43
- Language: English
- Label: Jagjaguwar
- Producer: David Bazan; Gia Margaret; Yoni Wolf

Gia Margaret chronology
| Mia Gargaret (2020) | Romantic Piano (2023) |

“Instrumental music just became part of my artistic makeup, my genetic makeup... The [COVID-19] pandemic happened and I, like so many of us, was just at a loss for words. I didn’t know how I felt about anything, so making more instrumental music felt like the right thing for me to do, rather than force my way through words.”

— Margaret on deciding to write instrumental music after regaining her singing voice.

Romantic Piano is the third full-length studio album by American pianist Gia Margaret, released in 2023.

== Reception ==
According to the review aggregator Metacritic, Romantic Piano received "universal acclaim" based on a weighted average score of 85 out of 100 from seven critic scores. Clash Music's Rae Niwa called this release "an experience of delicate beauty" that "seizes the undercurrents of our being to remember we are love" and scored this album an 8 out of 10. Critics from NPR's All Songs Considered included this among the five best albums of the week. In Paste, Matt Mitchell rated this album an 8.7 out of 10 for being Margaret's "best and brightest endeavor yet" that during its runtime "morphs into the opus of someone whose talents and vision could give a crack of lightning a run for its money". Andy Cush of Pitchfork rated this album a 7.8 out of 10, stating that the album "has far more personality and strangeness than its almost aggressively generic title suggests" and praising the songwriting variety. Writing for PopMatters, Christopher J. Lee gave Romantic Piano a 9 out of 10, commenting that "Margaret has perfected her voice" and that the music "stirs reverie and subjective free association".

Editors at The Fader chose this as the 45th best album of the year.

== Track listing ==
All songs written by Gia Margaret.

1. "Hinoki Wood" – 1:35
2. "Ways of Seeing" – 2:28
3. "Cicadas" – 2:15
4. "Juno" – 2:00
5. "A Stretch" – 1:39
6. "City Song" – 3:42
7. "Sitting at the Piano" – 0:30
8. "Guitar Piece" – 1:52
9. "La langue d'lamitié" – 3:12
10. "2017" – 3:43
11. "April to April" – 1:47
12. "Cinnamon" – 1:58

== Personnel ==
"Hinoki Wood"

- Gia Margaret – piano, synthesizer, mixing, production
- Sean O'Keefe – engineering
- Yoni Wolf – mixing

"Ways of Seeing"

- Gia Margaret – piano, synthesizer, field recording, engineering, mixing, production
- Yoni Wolf – mixing

"Cicadas"

- Gia Margaret – piano, synthesizer, field recording, engineering, mixing, production
- Scott Jacobsen – engineering
- Yoni Wolf – mixing

"Juno"

- Gia Margaret – piano, synthesizer, field recording, engineering, mixing, production
- Sean O'Keefe – engineering
- Yoni Wolf – mixing

"A Stretch"

- Gia Margaret – piano, field recording, mixing, production
- Jonnie Baker – saxophone
- Sean O'Keefe – engineering
- Yoni Wolf – mixing

"City Song"

- Gia Margaret – piano, synthesizer, vocals, production
- David Bazan – bass guitar, production
- Doug Saltzman – mixing, additional production
- Yoni Wolf – drums, mixing, production

"Sitting at the Piano"

- Gia Margaret – piano, field recording, mixing, production
- Sean O'Keefe – engineering
- Yoni Wolf – mixing

"Guitar Piece"

- Gia Margaret – piano, guitar, synthesizer, engineering, mixing, production
- Yoni Wolf – mixing

"La langue de l'amitié"

- Gia Margaret – piano, synthesizer, field recording, engineering, production
- David Bazan – drums, engineering, mixing, production, drum production

"2017"

- Gia Margaret – piano, synthesizer, vocals, mixing, production
- Jon Lawless – soft synthesizer, drum production, additional vocal production
- Sean O'Keefe – engineering
- Yoni Wolf – mixing, co-production

"April to April"

- Gia Margaret – piano, synthesizer, field recording, mixing, production
- Nicholas Papaleo – mixing

"Cinnamon"

- Gia Margaret – piano, synthesizer, field recording, mixing, production
- Sean O'Keefe – engineering
- Yoni Wolf – mixing

"A Hidden Track"

- Gia Margaret – piano, synthesizer, field recording, engineering, production
- Doug Saltzman – mixing, co-production

Technical personnel

- Brandt_Photo_Monochrome – back cover photography
- Dan Duszynski – mastering at Record Technology Incorporated – 40950
- Ash Dye – insert photography
- Nick Scott – art direction
- Rachel Winslow – cover artwork
- Devon Yesberger – transcription

== See also ==
- List of 2023 albums
