= Split EP! =

EP by Why? / Odd Nosdam
- Released: August 14, 2001
- Genre: Alternative hip hop
- Length: 63:40
- Label: Anticon
- Producer: Why? Odd Nosdam

Professional ratings
Review scores
Source	Rating
SF Weekly	(mixed)

Split EP! is a split EP from American indie hip hop artists Why? and Odd Nosdam. It was released on Anticon in 2001. The EP consists of Why?'s You'll Know Where Your Plane Is... and Odd Nosdam's EAT.

== Reception ==
Darren Keast of SF Weekly gave the EP a mixed review, saying: "While Split EP! provides a welcome respite from the conservatism of rap, it also sends up a red flag -- a warning that Anticon's 'alternative' might evolve into a samey-sounding cottage industry."

== Track listing ==
You'll Know Where Your Plane Is...

1. Untitled (0:24)
2. Untitled (2:11)
3. Untitled (1:29)
4. Untitled (1:50)
5. Untitled (1:00)
6. Untitled (2:12)
7. Untitled (3:49)

EAT

1. Untitled (1:27)
2. Untitled (1:51)
3. Untitled (1:11)
4. Untitled (1:43)
5. Untitled (2:09)
6. Untitled (1:03)
7. Untitled (2:06)
8. Untitled (31:07)
9. Untitled (7:59)
