= Jet Lag (Josiah Wolf album) =

Studio album by Josiah Wolf
- Released: March 2, 2010
- Genre: Indie rock
- Length: 46:36
- Label: Anticon
- Producer: Josiah Wolf

Josiah Wolf chronology
The Josiah EP (2003)	Jet Lag (2010)

Professional ratings
Aggregate scores
Source	Rating
Metacritic	62/100
Review scores
Source	Rating
AllMusic	3/5 stars
Beats Per Minute	77/100
Exclaim!	favorable
Impose	favorable
MusicOMH	3/5 stars
Pitchfork	5.6/10
PopMatters	3/10 stars
The Skinny	3/5 stars
URB	4.5/5 stars
XLR8R	6/10

Jet Lag is the first solo studio album by American multi-instrumentalist Josiah Wolf. It was released on Anticon on March 2, 2010. The songs on the album were written after the demise of Wolf's 11-year marriage. All the instruments were played by Wolf himself and recorded in a secluded cottage near Cincinnati, Ohio.

== Critical reception ==
At Metacritic, which assigns a weighted average score out of 100 to reviews from mainstream critics, Jet Lag received an average score of 62% based on 11 reviews, indicating "generally favorable reviews".

Brett Uddenberg of URB gave the album 4.5 stars out of 5, saying, "Wolf's elastic compositions straddle the line between a multitude of genres without making it sound forced." He added: "Widely respected as one of the best drummers on the indie scene for years, Josiah Wolf has deftly proven he has the chops to stand on his own."

Anthony Mark Happel of Impose said, "Wolf adds kalimba, organ, bells, drums, etc. to his mostly effective guitar playing, and there is a serious quality to the playing in general, underscored by a sense of self-effacement and humility in the insular poetry of the songs."

== Track listing ==
All tracks are written by Josiah Wolf.

No.	Title	Length
1.	"The Trailer and the Truck"	2:55
2.	"Master Cleanse (California)"	2:38
3.	"The Opposite of Breathing"	4:07
4.	"The New Car"	3:52
5.	"Skull in the Ice"	4:11
6.	"The Apart Meant"	3:54
7.	"That Kind of Man"	3:19
8.	"Ohioho"	5:16
9.	"Is the Body Hung"	3:33
10.	"In the Seam"	4:13
11.	"Gravity Defied"	5:25
12.	"The One Sign"	3:20
