= In the Shadow of the Living Room =

Studio album by Reaching Quiet
- Released: June 25, 2002
- Recorded: March 2000 – March 2001
- Studios: Cincinnati, Ohio
- Genre: Alternative hip-hop
- Length: 50:14
- Label: Mush Records
- Producers: Odd Nosdam, Why?

Professional ratings
Review scores
Source	Rating
AllMusic	4/5 stars
Dusted Magazine	favorable
Stylus Magazine	D+

In the Shadow of the Living Room is the debut and only studio album by American alternative hip-hop duo Reaching Quiet consisting of Yoni Wolf and Odd Nosdam. It was released on Mush Records in 2002.

The songs "Broken Crow" and "Me And The Pea Coat" would later reappear on the 2003 tour and companion live album "Almost Live From Anna's Cabin" of chief songwriter Yoni Wolf's band WHY? with different instrumentation and structure.

== Critical reception ==
Jason Nickey of AllMusic gave the album 4 stars out of 5, calling it "a surrealistic collage-style hip-hop symphony." In 2008, the track "Broken Crow" was listed by The A.V. Club as one of the "25 Sad Songs for Changing Seasons".

== Track listing ==
No.	Title	Length
1.	"Mother You're Long Gone"	1:27
2.	"She Ain't Gonna Call You Back (Part 1)"	1:58
3.	"Pier 39"	1:18
4.	"Your Fish"	3:11
5.	"Cabin Pressure"	0:57
6.	"Self Portrait Hand Puppet"	0:40
7.	"The Fly"	2:03
8.	"The Moth"	2:02
9.	"On Gummy Worms on Dental Floss"	0:53
10.	"Madame Rennevfski"	0:23
11.	"Salad Days"	0:53
12.	"Split Screen"	1:17
13.	"Housewife"	0:47
14.	"Her Little Office Watch"	1:42
15.	"Indecent Proposal"	1:58
16.	"The Vowels"	2:16
17.	"The Crush"	1:23
18.	"Slow Polaroid"	2:35
19.	"She Ain't Gonna Call You Back (Part 2)"	2:26
20.	"Me and the Pea Coat"	2:06
21.	"Out of Live Wires and Twisties"	2:17
22.	"Broken Crow"	3:01
23.	"Dead Man's Robin"	0:37
24.	"Jesse James' Thesaurical Advice"	1:02
25.	"Lisa Carmichael (Alan Keyes)"	1:19
26.	"My Prayer Rug"	0:33
27.	"I Beer"	1:14
28.	"You Choke"	3:58
29.	"The Comfy Chair"	0:41
30.	"General Disturbance"	3:26
