= The Lamb (album) =

Studio album by Lala Lala
- Released: September 28, 2018
- Length: 32:30
- Label: Hardly Art

Lala Lala chronology
Sleepyhead (2016)	The Lamb (2018)	I Want the Door to Open (2021)

Professional ratings
Aggregate scores
Source	Rating
Metacritic	75/100
Review scores
Source	Rating
The 405	8/10
Loud and Quiet	7/10
Paste	7.4/10
Pitchfork	7.5/10
Under the Radar	8.5/10

The Lamb is the third studio album by American musician Lillie West, under music project Lala Lala. It was released on September 28, 2018 under Hardly Art.

== Release ==
On July 13, 2018, the first single "Destroyer" was released. On August 21, 2018, West released the second single from the album, "Water Over Sex". West explained the song and the release of the album:

"The Lamb was written during a time of intense paranoia after a home invasion, deaths of loved ones and general violence around me and my friends. I started to frequently and vividly imagine the end of the world, often becoming too frightened to leave my house."

The third single "Dove" was released on September 10, 2018, along with the announcement of the new album. On September 28, 2018, the music video for "Scary Movie" was released.

== Tour ==
In support of the album, West announced an American tour from November 2018 to February 2019.

== Critical reception ==
The Lamb was met with "generally favorable" reviews from critics. At Metacritic, which assigns a weighted average rating out of 100 to reviews from mainstream publications, this release received an average score of 75, based on 7 reviews. Aggregator Album of the Year gave the release an 80 out of 100 based on a critical consensus of 8 reviews.

== Track listing ==
All tracks are written by Lillie West.

The Lamb track listing
No.	Title	Length
1.	"Destroyer"	3:12
2.	"Spy"	2:13
3.	"Water Over Sex"	2:50
4.	"I Get Cut"	2:18
5.	"Dove"	2:56
6.	"Dropout"	2:49
7.	"The Flu"	2:33
8.	"Copycat"	2:19
9.	"Scary Movie"	2:38
10.	"Moth"	1:59
11.	"When You Die"	2:32
12.	"See You at Home"	4:11
Total length:		32:30

== Personnel ==
Musicians

- Lillie West – primary artist, producer
- Emily Kempf – bass guitar, vocals
- Ben Leach – drums
- Sen Morimoto – saxophone

Production

- Dave Vettraino – engineer, mixer
