= Alopecia (album) =

Studio album by Why?
- Released: March 11, 2008
- Recorded: 2007
- Genre: Alternative hip hop
- Length: 44:56
- Label: Anticon
- Producer: Josiah Wolf; Yoni Wolf

Why? chronology
Rubber Traits EP (2005)	Alopecia (2008)	Almost Live from Eli's Live Room (2008)

Singles from Alopecia
- 1. "The Hollows" Released: November 27, 2007

Professional ratings
Aggregate scores
Source	Rating
Metacritic	76/100
Review scores
Source	Rating
AllMusic	4/5 stars
Robert Christgau	(1-star Honorable Mention)
Cokemachineglow	78/100
Pitchfork	8.2/10
The Skinny	5/5 stars
Slant Magazine	4/5 stars
Spin	7/10
The Stranger	4/5 stars
Variety	favorable
The Village Voice	favorable
Tiny Mix Tapes	4.5/5 stars

Alopecia is the third studio album by American band Why?. It was released by Anticon on March 11, 2008.

== Critical reception ==
At Metacritic, which assigns a weighted average score out of 100 to reviews from mainstream critics, Alopecia received an average score of 76% based on 21 reviews, indicating "generally favorable reviews".

Pitchfork placed "Fatalist Palmistry" at number 94 on the "100 Best Tracks of 2008" list.

== Sampling ==
"The Fall of Mr. Fifths" samples dialogue spoken by Will Oldham in the film Old Joy.

== Track listing ==
No.	Title	Length
1.	"The Vowels, Pt. 2"	4:04
2.	"Good Friday"	3:50
3.	"These Few Presidents"	3:04
4.	"The Hollows"	3:55
5.	"Song of the Sad Assassin"	4:13
6.	"Gnashville"	3:49
7.	"Fatalist Palmistry"	3:53
8.	"The Fall of Mr. Fifths"	3:16
9.	"Brook & Waxing"	2:35
10.	"A Sky for Shoeing Horses Under"	2:29
11.	"Twenty Eight"	0:44
12.	"Simeon's Dilemma"	3:33
13.	"By Torpedo or Crohn's"	4:04
14.	"Exegesis"	1:37

== Personnel ==
Credits adapted from the album's liner notes.

- Yoni Wolf – music, production, mixing, artwork
- Josiah Wolf – music, production, mixing
- Doug McDiarmid – music
- Andrew Broder – music
- Mark Erickson – music
- Doseone – additional contributions
- Jel – additional contributions
- Odd Nosdam – additional contributions
- Nedelle Torrisi – additional contributions
- Paul Flynn – additional contributions
- Liz Hodson – additional contributions
- Andrew McDiarmid – additional contributions
- Deborah Ranker – additional contributions
- Jeremy Ylvisaker – additional contributions
- Dee Kesler – additional contributions, mixing
- Tom Herbers – recording
- Eli Crews – mixing
- Mike Wells – mastering
- Sam Flax Keener – layout

== Charts ==
Chart (2008)	Peak position
US Heatseekers Albums (Billboard)	28
