= Rustic Houses, Forlorn Valleys =

Studio album by Hood
- Released: 1998
- Genre: Post-rock, slowcore
- Length: 45:54
- Label: Domino Records

Hood chronology
Structured Disasters (1997)	Rustic Houses, Forlorn Valleys (1998)	The Cycle of Days and Seasons (1999)

Professional ratings
Review scores
Source	Rating
Allmusic	2.5/5 stars

Rustic Houses, Forlorn Valleys is the fourth full-length record for the Leeds-based band Hood. The LP and CD versions were both released on Domino Records in 1998.

== Track listing ==
No.	Title	Length
1.	"S.E. Rain Patterns"	9:45
2.	"Boer Farmstead"	4:53
3.	"The Light Reveals the Place"	6:59
4.	"Your Ambient Voice"	6:57
5.	"The Leaves Grow Old and Die"	4:21
6.	"Diesel Pioneers"	12:59
