= More Deep Cuts =

Studio album by Thee More Shallows
- Released: September 20, 2004
- Genre: Indie rock
- Length: 39:52
- Labels: Monotreme Records (UK), Turn Records (US)

Thee More Shallows chronology
A History of Sport Fishing (2002)	More Deep Cuts (2004)	Cuts Plus Two (2005)

Professional ratings
Review scores
Source	Rating
AllMusic	4/5 stars
East Bay Express	favorable
Exclaim!	favorable
Punknews.org	3.5/5 stars
Uncut	4/5

More Deep Cuts is the second studio album by American indie rock band Thee More Shallows. It was originally released in the UK on September 20, 2004, by Monotreme Records, followed by a US release on July 12, 2005, by Turn Records. It was re-released on Turn Records in 2005. Later printings were released with an alternative cover.

== Critical reception ==
Sharon O' Connell wrote in Time Out London, October 2004: "...this is a thing of impossible beauty -- sweet, fierce, fragile, funny, heavy, strangely skewed and independently-minded. It's Grandaddy, Elliot Smith, Queens of the Stone Age, Swell, the glitchy side of Sparklehorse, Ralph Vaughan Williams and Tortoise, kissed by neo-classical grace and grazed by white noise. It's goddamned gorgeous.

Amy McGill gave the album an 8/10, in Rock Sound, September 2004, writing: "Fueled by an excess of imagination and dizzying noise assault. 'More Deep Cuts' is a remarkable, mercurial masterpiece."

Eden Parke, writing for Uncut, November 2004, gave the album a 4/5: "Kesler's softly spoken vocals provide a focus around which his songs blossom in an often euphoric fashion, and the inspired use of strings and toy pianos to flesh out the sound is never overstretched. Deeply addictive."

Luke Drozd, in Tasty Fanzine, September 2004, said: "Just listen to the immaculate and minute observations present here and it is clear that you are in the presence of true storytellers. I really can't express how much I love this record. It serves as a document as to what everything about an album should be. A remarkable achievement."

Hari Kunzru, writing in Wallpaper, September 2004, said: "San Francisco alt.rock has a unique aesthetic, one part beard and dungarees one part feral skate punk. Thee More Shallows, now on their second album, are coming through as one of the city's most appealing bands."

Sean 0, in Organ Art Magazine, September 20, 2004, gave the record Album of the Week honors, writing: "Whoooosh, this is glowing, this is uplifting, this is an utter heartwarming treasure, this is one of the most beautiful set of songs for a long long time ... One of the most beautifully rewarding albums you'll hear this year - do make the effort to find it, it's special."

Ian Fletcher, The Crack, October 2004: "Initially washing over you, yet creating deeply ingrained strains as it goes, this 2nd long-player from San Franciscan trio Thee More Shallows slowly but surely slices its way under the skin. "More Deep Cuts" revels in psychedelic flavours with a bittersweet aftertaste, like a clinical Sparklehorse riding to the dark patter of Tom Waits' mind. 50% sinister, 50% sensual, wholly, quietly, stunning."

Tom Sheriff, Comes With A Smile, September 2004: "It's fabulous stuff, reminiscent of the sonic playfulness of Yo La Tengo. Chavo Fraser, Jason Gonzales, Dee Kesler, producer Tadas Kisielius and their assisting cast of embellishers have made a wonderful album for those who appreciate the fine art of kitchen sink pop, marking Thee More Shallows as a band full of the promise to do a bit of groundbreaking in their time."

Total Music Magazine, December, 2004: "...the stark beauty of the songs are often undermined by an unsettling undercurrent that whips your legs away just as you begin to feel you're on solid ground."

Iain Moffat, Play Louder, December, 2004: "'More Deep Cuts' would suggest that Thee More Shallows have staggering strength in depth..."

Dave Stockwell, Diskant, December 2004: "My minor quibbles about 'A History of Sport Fishing' - sometimes I think perhaps it's a little overlong and occasionally unfocused - have been not so much addressed as obliterated this time around. Clocking in under 40 minutes (a good 20 less than their debut) and with a laser-sharp focus on music, lyrics and mood, I've found myself listening to 'More Deep Cuts' at least once a day since it arrived on my doorstep. I just can't help myself: this is pretty much perfect music."

== Track listing ==
No.	Title	Length
1.	"Post-Present"	1:38
2.	"Pre-Present"	3:29
3.	"Freshman Thesis"	5:02
4.	"Int"	2:18
5.	"Ave Grave"	2:42
6.	"Cold Dis"	0:53
7.	"Cloisterphobia"	4:30
8.	"2AM"	4:51
9.	"Int"	1:33
10.	"Walk of Shame"	5:33
11.	"Ask Me About Jon Stross"	4:05
12.	"House Break"	3:19
