= Singles Compiled =

Compilation album by Hood
- Released: March 2003
- Genres: Post-rock; Indie rock
- Length: 110:05
- Label: Misplaced Music

Hood chronology
Compilations 1995–2002 (2003)	Singles Compiled (2003)	The Hood Tapes (2005)

Professional ratings
Review scores
Source	Rating
Allmusic	4/5 stars

Singles Compiled is a compilation album by English post-rock band Hood, released on Misplaced Music along with Compilations 1995–2002 in March 2003. The album collects the band's early EPs and singles, as well as previously unreleased material.

== Track listing ==
All tracks are written by Hood.

Where Do We See Ourselves in 10 Years Time?
No.	Title	Length
1.	"A Harbour of Thoughts"	2:23
2.	"Disappointed"	2:10
3.	"Uneven Conversation Should Point to Cause"	1:41
4.	"[untitled]"	0:41
5.	"Forced by the Reasoning in Hand"	1:16
6.	"[untitled]"	0:24
7.	"John Clyde-Evans"	2:09
8.	"Clues to Our Past and Future Existence"	1:59
9.	"Myself"	1:13
10.	"Failed Medic"	1:57
11.	"Biochemistry Revision Can Wait"	1:00
12.	"England's Fine Fields"	0:44
13.	"I've Forgotten How to Live"	2:01
14.	"Rocck? I Can't Even Spell the Word"	1:40
15.	"Dismissed Army Brought Us Knives"	2:18
16.	"One Way Negative Friend Utilisation"	0:47
17.	"Stricken Office Worker"	2:56
18.	"I've Forgotten How to Live"	3:08
19.	"The Weather Side of Stone Mill Tower"	0:55
20.	"Dimensions T.B.A. (Abridged)"	3:53
21.	"Forehead"	1:27
22.	"[untitled]"	0:32
23.	"Crow Blown West"	1:27
24.	"Beware! Falling Ox"	0:46
25.	"I'm Turning Into a Cart"	1:41
26.	"Further Woodland"	0:41
27.	"20x"	0:39
28.	"Visions of Old Machinery"	2:20
29.	"Sometimes Doomed"	0:51
30.	"You Should Never Feel Alone in This World"	0:43
31.	"Crushed by Life"	2:12
32.	"(The) Weight"	3:16
33.	"Fallen Farmer"	0:57
34.	"We Are Not Promote"	0:44
35.	"Impossible Calm"	1:12
36.	"Feel the Rush"	1:05
37.	"(Coming In from the Avant Garde)"	0:54
38.	"I Know What to Squander"	1:35
39.	"Mast-on-Hill"	1:27
40.	"Collapsing Climate Soul"	1:38
Total length:		61:38

I See Myself Disappointed
No.	Title	Length
1.	"Filmed Initiative"	5:33
2.	"As Evening Changed the Day"	6:06
3.	"The Year of Occasional Lull"	4:09
4.	"Fog Projections"	6:44
5.	"Innocence of Brittle Days"	1:10
6.	"Morpath"	3:15
7.	"We'll Never Live Up to the First LP"	1:28
8.	"Interlude"	0:50
9.	"Consulting Architecture"	2:36
10.	"Create!"	0:58
11.	"I Held Her in My Arms"	0:48
12.	"Leaves Across the Road"	1:32
13.	"Landlocked"	3:24
14.	"Killing the Band"	1:07
15.	"To Emphasise Words"	2:04
16.	"15 Ways to Dispose of the Broken Man"	2:25
17.	"The Go-Between"	1:38
18.	"The Rain Never Tires"	1:09
19.	"State of the Art"	1:24
Total length:		48:27 110:05
