= Compilations 1995–2002 =

Compilation album by Hood
- Released: 10 March 2003
- Recorded: 1995–2002
- Genres: Post-rock; Indie rock
- Length: 66:22
- Label: Misplaced Music

Hood chronology
Cold House (2001)	Compilations 1995–2002 (2003)	Singles Compiled (2003)

Professional ratings
Review scores
Source	Rating
Pitchfork	7.6/10
Allmusic	3/5 stars

Compilations 1995–2002 is a compilation album by English band Hood, released on Misplaced Music alongside the album Singles Compiled on 10 March 2003. The album primarily comprises material previously found on various artists compilations, as well as material from some of the band's previous singles.

== Track listing ==
All tracks are written by Hood, except where noted.

No.	Title	Music	Length
1.	"For a Moment, Lost"		2:31
2.	"Free Minds from Small Towns Wanted"		1:23
3.	"Aube Remix"	Akifuka Nakajima	2:48
4.	"Lo Band Width"		3:50
5.	"All My Friends Are Dead"		2:48
6.	"The Treacherous Mytholm Sleeps"		3:54
7.	"Sound the Cliche Klaxons"		5:00
8.	"I Have It in My Heart to Jump Into the Ocean"		6:42
9.	"A Shot Across the Bow"		4:13
10.	"Finger in His Ear"		1:40
11.	"Leylines"		6:17
12.	"Two Left Channels Down; Who Needs Enemies"		1:44
13.	"Cross the Land"		4:43
14.	"Redundant"		2:50
15.	"The Day to Stand Alone"		1:33
16.	"By Early Light"		6:34
17.	"Song of the Sea"		2:36
18.	"Attempts to Revive the Victim Failed"		1:00
19.	"You Should Never Feel Alone in This World"		2:53
20.	"Art Without Precedent or Tradition"		1:16
Total length:			66:22
