= Hymie's Vintage Records =

Hymie’s Vintage Records (also known simply as Hymie’s) was a vinyl record store in Minneapolis, Minnesota.

== History ==
Hymie's was opened in 1988 by Jim “Hymie” Peterson on Lake Street in Minneapolis. The store carried exclusively analog audio media for most of its life. In 2010 the store relocated five blocks east to a new location. The Hymie's blog began in October 2009, and posted nearly every day about interesting or unusual records, local music reviews and local music events. Starting in 2009, Hymie’s had a shop dog, a Boston terrier named Irene, who became an icon for the store. Irene has been photographed by Rolling Stone, and also appeared on popular T-shirts and as Miss June in a charity calendar. Hymie’s had been singled out as one of the best record stores in the United States by Rolling Stone and USA Today, and has been featured in many other publications.

Hymie's suddenly closed permanently at the end of June 2025.

== Hymie's label ==
The 2003 LP Hymie’s Basement was recorded in the basement of the original record store and released by Lex Records. In 2014 the store launched its own record label with a single by Brian Laidlaw and the Family Trade and, simultaneously, the eighth album by Ben Weaver, I Would Rather Be a Buffalo.
