= Cold House =

Studio album by Hood
- Released: 12 November 2001
- Studios: Hall Place (Leeds, England); Cold House Studios (Leeds, England)
- Genres: Post-rock; experimental rock; glitch pop
- Length: 46:09
- Label: Domino

Hood chronology
The Cycle of Days and Seasons (1999)	Cold House (2001)	Compilations 1995–2002 (2003)

Singles from Cold House
- 1. "You Show No Emotion at All" Released: 22 April 2002

Cold House is the fifth studio album by English post-rock band Hood, released by Domino Recording Company on 12 November 2001. Three tracks on the album feature vocal contributions from Doseone and Why? of Clouddead. The track "You Show No Emotion at All" was later re-released on an EP of the same name, paired with three additional non-album tracks.

== Critical reception ==
Professional ratings
Aggregate scores
Source	Rating
Metacritic	87/100
Review scores
Source	Rating
AllMusic	4.5/5 stars
Alternative Press	9/10
The Guardian	4/5 stars
Muzik	3/5
NME	8/10
Pitchfork	8.5/10
Q	4/5 stars
Spin	8/10
Stylus Magazine	B+
Uncut	4/5 stars

At Metacritic, which assigns a weighted average score out of 100 to reviews from mainstream critics, Cold House received an average score of 87, based on 14 reviews, indicating "universal acclaim".

Bradley Torreano of AllMusic described the album as "the next step toward the icy-cold future of alternative rock that Kid A forecasted". Philip Sherburne of Cleveland Scene called it "not only one of the most melancholy records of late, but also a triumph of musical gene splicing, drawing together folk-flavored indie rock and the skittering beats of experimental electronica". Nathan Rooney of Pitchfork commented that "with Cold House, Hood seem to have finally stumbled into a sound all their own".

In 2016, Fact ranked Cold House at number 14 on its list of the best post-rock albums of all time, while Paste ranked it as the 44th best post-rock album.

== Track listing ==
No.	Title	Length
1.	"They Removed All Trace That Anything Had Ever Happened Here"	5:20
2.	"You Show No Emotion at All"	5:13
3.	"Branches Bare"	5:55
4.	"Enemy of Time"	3:22
5.	"The Winter Hit Hard"	5:42
6.	"I Can't Find My Brittle Youth"	3:11
7.	"This Is What We Do to Sell Out(s)"	3:05
8.	"The River Curls Around the Town"	3:23
9.	"Lines Low to Frozen Ground"	5:15
10.	"You're Worth the Whole World"	5:43

== Personnel ==
Credits adapted from liner notes.

- Hood – music, post production, recording, mixing
- Doseone – additional vocals (1, 3, 10), additional lyrics (1, 3, 10)
- Why? – additional vocals (1, 3, 10), additional lyrics (1, 3, 10)
- Matthew Robson – additional drums (6)
- Sarah McWatt – flute
- Andrew Staveley – trumpet
- Richard Formby – acoustic guitar, recording
- Choque Hosein – post production, mixing
- C. Adams – photography
- S. Royle – photography
- M. Cooper – sleeve design
