= The Cycle of Days and Seasons =

Studio album by Hood
- Released: April 1999
- Genre: Post-rock, slowcore
- Length: 42:48
- Label: Domino

Hood chronology
Rustic Houses, Forlorn Valleys (1998)	The Cycle of Days and Seasons (1999)	Cold House (2001)

Professional ratings
Review scores
Source	Rating
AllMusic	3.5/5 stars
The Encyclopedia of Popular Music	4/5 stars
The Times	8/10

The Cycle of Days and Seasons is a full-length album by the Leeds-based band Hood. Both the LP and CD versions were released on Domino Records in 1999.

== Critical reception ==
Reviewing a reissue, Pitchfork wrote: "Voices echo and loop, a slightly fuzzy recording of church bells recurs at points during the album, and the crackle and buried beats of 'In Iron Light' implicitly suggest what else was happening in the sonic universe."

== Track listing ==
No.	Title	Length
1.	"Western Housing Concerns"	5:34
2.	"Hood is Finished"	4:12
3.	"//- (Part 1)"	0:54
4.	"September Brings the Autumn Dawn"	5:33
5.	"In Iron Light"	3:35
6.	"How Can You Drag Your Body Blindly Through?"	5:48
7.	"Houses Tilting Towards the Sea"	4:51
8.	"//- (Part 2)"	0:38
9.	"Roads Lead Northwards"	6:02
10.	"//- (Part 3)"	0:59
11.	"...The Cliff Edge of Workaday Morality"	4:42
