= Cabled Linear Traction =

Studio album by Hood
- Released: June 1995
- Recorded: 1994
- Genre: Indie
- Length: 50:14
- Label: Slumberland Records

Hood chronology
Cabled Linear Traction (1995)	Silent '88 (1996)

Professional ratings
Review scores
Source	Rating
Allmusic	3/5 stars

Cabled Linear Traction is the first full-length album by English band Hood. The LP version was released on Fluff Records in 1994, limited to 200 copies and on Slumberland Records in 1995, limited to 1100 copies. The CD version was released on Slumberland Records in 1999.

== Track listing ==
No.	Title	Length
1.	"Norfolk"	2:27
2.	"Evening Return"	3:28
3.	"Untitled"	2:51
4.	"The Hay Harvest Had Special Charms"	1:41
5.	"An Oblique View of an Irrationally Happy Time"	2:59
6.	"Small Town Prejudices"	3:13
7.	"Abstracting Electricity"	1:19
8.	"A Spell of Rain"	1:07
9.	"Fades to End a Day"	3:40
10.	"Fashion Mistake of the Decade"	2:19
11.	"Summers Last Annual"	3:19
12.	"Coastal Driftings"	1:38
13.	"British Radars"	4:36
14.	"Church, Circular"	1:26
15.	"Be Nice to Everyone at All Times (With a Few Important Exceptions)"	1:07
16.	"Finite Differences"	0:56
17.	"Highly Competitive Cut Throat World"	1:15
18.	"Hurt"	1:16
19.	"Untitled #2"	8:10
20.	"A Thinly Veiled Excuse for Something More"	1:27
