= Silent '88 =

Studio album by Hood
- Released: September 1996
- Genre: Indie
- Length: 63:48
- Label: Slumberland Records

Hood chronology
Cabled Linear Traction (1995)	Silent '88 (1996)	Structured Disasters (1996)

Professional ratings
Review scores
Source	Rating
AllMusic	3/5 stars

Silent '88 is second full-length album by English band Hood. Both the CD and LP versions were released on the Slumberland Records label in 1996.

== Track listing ==
No.	Title	Length
1.	"The Field Is Cut"	4:25
2.	"Hood Northern"	3:51
3.	"Delusions of Worthlessness"	3:45
4.	"At Last! Riots on Spofforth Hill"	0:48
5.	Untitled	0:32
6.	"Rural Colors"	2:30
7.	"Western Skies"	2:43
8.	"Deny Deny Deny"	1:16
9.	"Smash Your Head on the Cubist Jazz"	1:12
10.	"The Hidden Ambience of a Lost Art"	3:33
11.	"Being Beaten Up"	0:40
12.	"Silent '88"	4:11
13.	"Outro"	0:51
14.	"Intro"	0:43
15.	"Documenting Crop Rotations"	2:08
16.	"I Hate You Now"	0:28
17.	"Her Innocent Stock of Words"	3:18
18.	"Trust Me, I'm a Stomach"	2:47
19.	"Resonant 1942"	2:00
20.	"Sometimes I Worry"	1:54
21.	Untitled	0:27
22.	"Downpour"	2:43
23.	"The Fields Are Divided"	1:38
24.	"Love Is Dead But Never Buried"	2:43
25.	"Empty Canvas"	1:49
26.	"The Silent Years"	11:03
