= Mia Gargaret =

Studio album by Gia Margaret
- Released: June 12, 2020
- Recorded: Mid- to late 2019
- Genre: Ambient
- Length: 27:34
- Language: English
- Label: Dalliance Recordings; Orindal Records
- Producer: Gia Margaret

Gia Margaret chronology
There's Always Glimmer (2018)	Mia Gargaret (2020)	Romantic Piano (2023)

I produced [There's Always] Glimmer, and a lot of that music, though there's lyrics and singing in it, the mood and the production of the music is so much a part of what the music is. I feel like I've always been interested and this kind of forced me in rediscovering that part of myself because that was literally all that I could do at the time.

— Margaret on the opportunities and challenges of making music after having lost her voice.

Mia Gargaret is the second full-length studio album by American pianist Gia Margaret, released in 2020.

== Reception ==
According to the review aggregator Metacritic, Mia Gargaret received "universal acclaim" based on a weighted average score of 81 out of 100 from six critic scores. Writing for Clash Music, Rae Niwa rated this album an 8 out of 10, telling listeners, "in totality this album will leave you in a pool of your own unraveling". Chris Gee of Exclaim! gave the same rating, calling this work one that "illuminates immense growth and versatility in Margaret's strength as a songwriter and as a producer". Craig Howieson of The Line of Best Fit issued another 8 out of 10 rating, comparing this album to a kite in the wind for how light the music is and continuing that it "sounds like a vital exhalation". Writing for Pitchfork, Quinn Moreland rated Mia Gargaret a 7.0 out of 10, noting the variety of moods and sounds in the recording and how it expresses Margaret's experience of recovering from losing her voice.

== Track listing ==
All songs written by Gia Margaret.

1. "apathy" – 3:09
2. "body" – 2:19
3. "INWIW" – 3:00
4. "barely there" – 2:35
5. "for Zoya in China" – 2:54
6. "no sleep no dream" – 1:46
7. "lakes" – 1:38
8. "sadballad" – 1:41
9. "3 movements" – 4:14
10. "ash" – 2:41
11. "lesson" – 1:38

== Personnel ==
- Gia Margaret – instrumentation, vocals, recording, mixing, production
- Emily Cross – clarinet on "ash"
- Nicholas Papaleo – mixing
- Doug Saltzman – additional mixing on "barely there" and "lesson", additional production on "lesson"
- Carley Solether – design, photography
- Stephen Steinbrink – guitar on "lesson", organ on "lesson", vocals on "lesson", drum production on "barely there", additional production on "barely there" and "lesson"

== See also ==
- List of 2020 albums
