= A History of Sport Fishing =

Studio album by Thee More Shallows
- Released: May 7, 2002
- Genre: Indie rock
- Length: 58:47
- Labels: Monotreme Records, Megalon Records

Thee More Shallows chronology
| A History of Sport Fishing (2002) | More Deep Cuts (2004) |

Professional ratings
Review scores
| Source | Rating |
|---|---|
| AllMusic | 4/5 stars |
| Pitchfork | 6.0/10 |

A History of Sport Fishing is the first studio album by American indie rock band Thee More Shallows. It was released on Monotreme Records and Megalon Records in 2002.

Early copies of the album have a sticker over the band's former name, "Thee Shallows". This is because a cease-and-desist order was issued after the band was contacted by Brian Gregory from the band The Shallows. Subsequent printings of the album feature a completely new cover.

== Critical reception ==
Brian Way of AllMusic gave the album 4 stars out of 5, saying: "It's the unstrained subtlety and understatement of the songs collected here that make A History of Sport Fishing such a rewarding listening experience and set the stage for the albums to come." Joe Tangari of Pitchfork gave the album a 6.0 out of 10, saying, "though almost uniformly pleasant, A History of Sport Fishing seldom casts a truly strong hook to reel you into its world."

== Track listing ==
| No. | Title | Length |
|---|---|---|
| 1. | "Where Are You Now?" | 4:16 |
| 2. | "The 8th Ring of Hell" | 6:29 |
| 3. | "Pulchritude" | 2:35 |
| 4. | "A History of Sport Fishing" | 7:00 |
| 5. | "The Cruxxx" | 4:21 |
| 6. | "Ballad of Douglas Chin" | 3:58 |
| 7. | "Aerodrome" | 3:37 |
| 8. | "I Do So Have a Sense of Humor" | 6:15 |
| 9. | "The Perfect Map" | 8:03 |
| 10. | "He Hate Me" | 3:37 |
| 11. | "The Horizon Is a Single Point" | 6:36 |
