= Outside Closer =

Studio album by Hood
- Released: 17 January 2005
- Genres: Indie rock, glitch pop; experimental pop
- Length: 46:38
- Label: Domino
- Producers: Hood, Choque Hosein

Hood chronology
Singles Compiled (2003)	Outside Closer (2005)

Singles from Outside Closer
- 1. "The Lost You" Released: 2004; 2. "The Negatives..." Released: 2005

Outside Closer is the sixth studio album by Hood. It was released on Domino Recording Company on 17 January 2005.

== Critical reception ==
Professional ratings
Aggregate scores
Source	Rating
Metacritic	80/100
Review scores
Source	Rating
AllMusic	4/5 stars
Cokemachineglow	83%
Drowned in Sound	9/10
The Guardian	3/5 stars
Mojo	4/5 stars
Pitchfork	8.6/10
PopMatters	7/10
Q	3.5/5 stars
Stylus	B+
Under the Radar	8/10

At Metacritic, which assigns a weighted average score out of 100 to reviews from mainstream critics, the album received an average score of 80, based on 27 reviews, indicating "generally favorable reviews".

No Ripchord placed it at number 14 on the "Top 50 Albums of 2005" list.

== Track listing ==
No.	Title	Length
1.	"Int"	0:39
2.	"The Negatives..."	3:43
3.	"Any Hopeful Thoughts Arrive"	6:55
4.	"End of One Train Working"	5:11
5.	"Winter 72"	6:10
6.	"The Lost You"	4:41
7.	"Still Rain Fell"	4:45
8.	"L. Fading Hills"	4:25
9.	"Closure"	7:33
10.	"This Is It, Forever"	2:36

== Personnel ==
Credits adapted from liner notes.

- Hood – music, production, mixing, photography, sleeve design
- I. Haywood – additional drums (3)
- Nicola Hodgkinson – vocals
- Andrew Johnson – vocals
- G. S. Brown – piano, keyboards
- M. Wright – flute, clarinet
- E. Marcasi – trumpet, horns
- Omar Puente – viola
- Choque Hosein – percussion, production, recording, mixing
- C. Adams – recording
- Richard Formby – additional recording
- Julian Scott Wellington – additional recording
- Dallas – mastering
- Matt Cooper – sleeve design
