= There's Always Glimmer =

Studio album by Gia Margaret
- Released: July 27, 2018
- Studio: Decade Music Studios, Chicago, Illinois, United States; Inside Voice; Soundhole Studios
- Genre: Indie folk
- Length: 34:37
- Language: English
- Label: Dalliance Recordings; Orindal Records
- Producer: Gia Margaret

Gia Margaret chronology
There's Always Glimmer (2018)	Mia Gargaret (2020)

Professional ratings
Review scores
Source	Rating
Pitchfork	7.4/10
The Line of Best Fit	8/10
The 405	8.5/10

There's Always Glimmer is the first full-length studio album by American pianist Gia Margaret, released in 2018.

== Reception ==
According to the review aggregator Metacritic, There's Always Glimmer received "generally favorable reviews" based on a weighted average score of 75 out of 100 from six critic scores. Writing for The Line of Best Fit, Chris Taylor rated this album an 8 out of 10, praising Margaret's vocals and stating that the album "isn’t perfect, but that's appropriate really: trying to sort out your feelings in trauma's wake never is". Margaret Farrell of Pitchfork gave this album a 7.4 out of 10, writing that it is made up of "serene, perceptive storytelling" and that the singing "radiates nostalgia, but not longing".

== Track listing ==
All songs written by Gia Margaret.

1. "Groceries" – 3:35
2. "Birthday" – 3:47
3. "Figures" – 2:54
4. "Smoke" – 3:48
5. "Goodnight" – 2:55
6. "In Normal Ways" – 2:52
7. "Looking" – 3:24
8. "For Flora" – 1:45
9. "Sugar" – 2:15
10. "Exist" – 2:45
11. "Wayne" – 2:16
12. "West" – 2:22

== Personnel ==
- Gia Margaret – instrumentation, vocals, recording, mixing, production
- Bob Buckstaff – bass guitar on "Birthday" and "Goodnight"
- Chris Dye – drum production on "Exist"
- Scott Jacobson – guitar on "Exist", recording
- Jessica Jones – design
- Brendan Losch – guitar on "Birthday", backing vocals on "Birthday"
- John Morton – drums on "Birthday" and "Figures", backing vocals on "Birthday"
- Nicholas Papaleo – keyboards on "Birthday", "Goodnight", and "Exist"; bass guitar on "In Normal Ways" and "Exist"; recording; mixing
- Ivan Pyzow – trumpet on "Figures"
- Rand Renfrow – illustration
- Molly Rife – cello on "Smoke"
- Doug Saltzman – recording, mixing, drum production on "Smoke" and "West"
- Quinn Tsan – vocals on "Looking"
- Rachel Winslow – photography

== See also ==
- List of 2018 albums
