= Mumps, Etc. =

Studio album by Why?
- Released: October 9, 2012
- Genre: Indie rock
- Length: 38:48
- Labels: Anticon; City Slang
- Producers: Josiah Wolf; Yoni Wolf

Why? chronology
Sod in the Seed (2012)	Mumps, Etc. (2012)	Golden Tickets (2013)

Professional ratings
Aggregate scores
Source	Rating
Metacritic	62/100
Review scores
Source	Rating
AllMusic	4.5/5 stars
The A.V. Club	B−
Beats Per Minute	78/100
Consequence of Sound	C−
NME	7/10
Paste	7.4/10
Pitchfork	2.8/10
Slant Magazine	3.5/5 stars
DIY (magazine)	4/5 stars

Mumps, Etc. is the fifth studio album by American band Why?. It was released by Anticon in the United States on October 9, 2012 and by City Slang in Europe on October 8, 2012.

== Critical reception ==
At Metacritic, which assigns a weighted average score out of 100 to reviews from mainstream critics, Mumps, Etc. received an average score of 62% based on 19 reviews, indicating "generally favorable reviews".

Mike Lechevallier of Slant Magazine said, "Mumps, Etc. isn't a career-defining moment like Alopecia, but it's a celebratory return to form for Why?, reuniting the band with the key attributes that ignited their creativity in the first place." Ryan Reed of Paste called it "their most layered, headphone-friendly set to date, utilizing an eight-member choir and a string quartet, not to mention plenty of harps, flutes and ass-blasting rhythms."

Alarm included it on the "50 Favorite Albums of 2012" list.

== Track listing ==
No.	Title	Length
1.	"Jonathan's Hope"	3:17
2.	"Strawberries"	3:18
3.	"Waterlines"	3:33
4.	"Thirteen on High"	3:09
5.	"White English"	2:57
6.	"Danny"	1:28
7.	"Sod in the Seed"	4:43
8.	"Distance"	2:53
9.	"Thirst"	2:28
10.	"Kevin's Cancer"	2:24
11.	"Bitter Thoughts"	2:47
12.	"Paper Hearts"	4:08
13.	"As a Card"	1:43
Total length:		38:48

== Personnel ==
Credits adapted from the album's liner notes.

- Yoni Wolf – music, production, recording, mixing
- Josiah Wolf – music, production, recording
- Doug McDiarmid – music
- Eric Michener – claps
- James Kerr – flugelhorn
- Ryan Williams – double bass
- Kelsey Pickford – woodwinds
- Buffi Jacobs – cello
- Brandon Stewart – French horn
- Stephan Beall – violin, viola
- Laura Max – harp
- Elizabeth Knight – vocals
- Liz Wolf – vocals
- Andrew Broder – vocals
- Nathan Goodrich – vocals
- Brent 'Snake' Benedict – recording
- Graham Marsh (producer) – mixing
- John Horesco IV – mastering
