= Structured Disasters =

Studio album by Hood
- Released: 1996 (LP), 1997 (CD)
- Recorded: 1990–1996
- Genres: Indie rock; Post-rock
- Length: 46:07
- Label: Happy Go Lucky

Hood chronology
Silent '88 (1996)	Structured Disasters (1996)	Rustic Houses, Forlorn Valleys (1998)

Professional ratings
Review scores
Source	Rating
Allmusic	4/5 stars

Structured Disasters is a compilation album by English band Hood, released on LP in 1996 and CD in 1997 by Happy Go Lucky. Like the band's other compilation releases, Structured Disasters collects many of their early, out-of-print singles as well as some previously unreleased material.

== Track listing ==
No.	Title	Length
1.	"Swan Finer"	1:01
2.	"Sirens"	3:53
3.	"Your Sixth Sense"	3:12
4.	"Silo Crash"	2:43
5.	"A Dead Day"	2:10
6.	"I Didn't Think You Were Going to Hit Me in the Face"	1:50
7.	"Toel Bow"	1:14
8.	"Choosing a Grimace"	2:54
9.	"My Last August"	5:09
10.	"Experimental Filmmaking"	1:19
11.	"Experiments in Silence"	1:43
12.	"Fears Grow"	2:13
13.	"Dismissed Army Brought Us Knives"	2:11
14.	"One Way Negative Friend Utilisation"	0:46
15.	"I Said Yes Unwise Yet Again"	3:53
16.	"70's Manual Worker"	2:57
17.	"Doubts Slowly Fade"	2:54
18.	"How Bad Can it Be?"	4:00
