= Hymie's Basement (album) =

Studio album by Hymie's Basement
- Released: October 21, 2003
- Studio: Hymie's Vintage Records; Third Ear
- Genre: Indie rock
- Length: 45:22
- Label: Lex Records
- Producer: Andrew Broder, Yoni Wolf

Professional ratings
Review scores
Source	Rating
Cokemachineglow	68%
The Observer	3/5 stars
Pitchfork	8.3/10
Spannered	favorable
Stylus Magazine	C+

Hymie's Basement is the debut studio album by American indie rock duo Hymie's Basement. It was released on Lex Records in 2003. Much of the album was recorded at Hymie's Vintage Records.

== Critical reception ==
Scott Reid of Stylus Magazine gave the album a grade of C+, saying: "The real problem with this record, like with Fog's Ether Teeth and Why?'s Oaklandazulasylum (both also released this year), is the inability to use the momentum of its several great ideas to produce an effective whole." Dan Lett of Pitchfork gave the album an 8.3 out of 10, saying: "Unlike many two-man collaborative efforts, ego and testosterone are mostly left out of the equation on Hymie's Basement, replaced by misanthropy and self-deprecation." He added: "Thematically, the record has a unity that suggests a long-term alliance but the vibrant arrangements buzz with the exhilaration of a new relationship."

== Track listing ==
All tracks are written by Jonathan Wolf and Andrew Broder.

No.	Title	Length
1.	"21st Century Pop Song"	4:29
2.	"All Them Boys"	4:22
3.	"Suite of the Fearless Tall Dude Killer"	2:28
4.	"Ghost Dream"	2:55
5.	"The Act"	2:01
6.	"Moonhead"	2:51
7.	"The Pump"	2:13
8.	"Parrots"	2:58
9.	"Pretty Colors (Smile Your Brains Out)"	4:11
10.	"Ben and Joey"	1:15
11.	"America Won"	1:57
12.	"America Too"	1:40
13.	"I Am a Sewer at Heart"	1:53
14.	"Lightning Bolts and Man Hands"	6:08
15.	"You Die"	4:02

== Personnel ==
Credits adapted from liner notes.

- Jonathan Wolf – production, performance
- Andrew Broder – production, performance
- Fancy Ray McCloney – vocals (8)
- Jeremy Ylvisaker – recording (2, 3, 4, 5, 6, 7, 8, 10, 11, 12, 13, 14)
- Tom Herbers – recording (1, 9, 15)
- George Horn – mastering
