= Eskimo Snow =

Studio album by Why?
- Released: September 22, 2009
- Recorded: 2007
- Genre: Indie rock
- Length: 35:40
- Label: Anticon
- Producers: Josiah Wolf; Yoni Wolf

Why? chronology
Almost Live from Eli's Live Room (2008)	Eskimo Snow (2009)	Sod in the Seed (2012)

Professional ratings
Aggregate scores
Source	Rating
Metacritic	76/100
Review scores
Source	Rating
AllMusic	3.5/5 stars
The A.V. Club	B−
Clash	8/10
Cokemachineglow	70/100
Exclaim!	favorable
Pitchfork	6.9/10
PopMatters	8/10 stars
The Skinny	4/5 stars
Slant Magazine	3.5/5 stars
XLR8R	8/10

Eskimo Snow is the fourth studio album by American band Why?. It was released by Anticon on September 22, 2009.

== Production ==
The album was recorded in February 2007. When asked to compare it to his previous albums, Yoni Wolf said: "This record, Eskimo Snow, is really the least hip-hop out of anything I've ever been involved with. I mean, they feel like song-songs with-- I don't want to say a typical verse-chorus structure, but they're song-songs."

== Critical reception ==
At Metacritic, which assigns a weighted average score out of 100 to reviews from mainstream critics, Eskimo Snow received an average score of 76% based on 17 reviews, indicating "generally favorable reviews".

Marisa Brown of AllMusic gave the album 3.5 stars out of 5, calling it "a dynamic, nearly poppy record that finds lead singer Yoni Wolf slightly less verbose and esoteric than in the past." She added, "Eskimo Snow is a success, a resilient album that combines melody, abstract references, and intelligent introspection in equal parts into something that grows more and more compelling the more times it's heard." Josiah Hughes of Exclaim! said, "Eskimo Snow sees Why? losing some of their previous intensity for quieter, albeit deeply layered, pop structures."

== Track listing ==
No.	Title	Writer(s)	Length
1.	"These Hands"	Jonathan Wolf	1:47
2.	"January Twenty Something"	Jonathan Wolf	2:24
3.	"Against Me"	Jonathan Wolf	5:12
4.	"Even the Good Wood Gone"	Doug McDiarmid, Jonathan Wolf, Josiah Wolf	4:19
5.	"Into the Shadows of My Embrace"	Jonathan Wolf	4:35
6.	"One Rose"	Doug McDiarmid, Jonathan Wolf, Josiah Wolf	3:53
7.	"On Rose Walk, Insomniac"	Jonathan Wolf	2:08
8.	"Berkeley by Hearseback"	Doug McDiarmid, Matt Meldon, Jonathan Wolf, Josiah Wolf	3:40
9.	"This Blackest Purse"	Doug McDiarmid, Jonathan Wolf	5:16
10.	"Eskimo Snow"	Jonathan Wolf	2:29

== Personnel ==
Credits adapted from the album's liner notes.

- Yoni Wolf – music
- Josiah Wolf – music
- Doug McDiarmid – music
- Andrew Broder – music
- Mark Erickson – music
- Jeremy Ylvisaker – additional contributions
- Andrew McDiarmid – additional contributions
- Mark Nevers – additional contributions, mixing
- Eli Crews – mixing
- Mike Wells – mastering
- Ms. Indigo Sweats – artwork
- Phoebe Streblow – photography
- Sam Flax Keener – layout

== Charts ==
Chart (2009)	Peak position
US Heatseekers Albums (Billboard)	20
US Independent Albums (Billboard)	44
