= Testarossa (album) =

Studio album by Yoni & Geti
- Released: May 6, 2016
- Genre: Hip-hop, indie pop
- Length: 36:10
- Label: Joyful Noise
- Producer: Yoni Wolf

Testarossa is a collaborative studio album by Yoni Wolf and Serengeti, as Yoni & Geti. It was released on Joyful Noise Recordings on May 6, 2016. Based on a script the two wrote together on tour, it is a concept album, telling the story of a star-crossed couple named Maddy and Davy. On May 2, 2016, BrooklynVegan premiered a stream of the full album. A music video was created for "Madeline".

== Critical reception ==
Professional ratings
Aggregate scores
Source	Rating
Metacritic	76/100
Review scores
Source	Rating
AllMusic	3.5/5 stars
Christgau's Consumer Guide	B+
Pitchfork	7.2/10
The Skinny	4/5 stars

At Metacritic, which assigns a weighted average score out of 100 to reviews from mainstream critics, the album received an average score of 76, based on 4 reviews, indicating "generally favorable reviews".

James Christopher Monger of AllMusic gave the album 3.5 out of 5 stars, describing it as "a densely packed, atmosphere-driven conceptual piece with one foot in the underground rap scene and the other in the increasingly elastic indie pop realm." He added, "the two manage to find a little tenderness in their protagonists' struggles, and while it can make for some uncomfortable moments, it's never not compelling."

In June 2016, Christopher R. Weingarten of Rolling Stone named it one of the "Best Rap Albums of 2016 So Far".

== Track listing ==
No.	Title	Length
1.	"Umar Rashid"	1:16
2.	"Allegheny"	4:05
3.	"Madeline"	3:26
4.	"Frank"	3:05
5.	"Lunchline"	3:55
6.	"Change"	0:47
7.	"Wassup (Uh Huh)"	1:53
8.	"Lucky Town"	2:47
9.	"What a Fool"	0:47
10.	"Simone"	2:45
11.	"Down"	2:37
12.	"The Lore"	3:12
13.	"I, Testarossa"	4:01
14.	"Simple & Sweet"	1:34

== Personnel ==
Credits adapted from liner notes.

- Serengeti – vocals
- Yoni Wolf – vocals, production, recording, mixing
- eddy kwon – violin (5)
- John Horesco IV – mastering
- David J. Woodruff – design
