= Monkey vs. Shark =

EP by Thee More Shallows
- Released: April 3, 2006
- Genre: Indie rock
- Length: 18:52 (Monotreme Records version); 27:52 (Turn Records version)
- Labels: Monotreme Records, Turn Records

Thee More Shallows chronology
| Cuts Plus Two (2005) | Monkey vs. Shark (2006) | Book of Bad Breaks (2007) |

Professional ratings
Review scores
| Source | Rating |
|---|---|
| AllMusic | 3.5/5 stars |
| Drowned in Sound | 9/10 |
| SF Weekly | favorable |
| Tiny Mix Tapes | 4/5 stars |

Monkey vs. Shark is an EP by American indie rock band Thee More Shallows. It was released on Monotreme Records and Turn Records in 2006.

== Track listing ==
Monotreme Records version

| No. | Title | Length |
|---|---|---|
| 1. | "Monkey vs. Shark" | 4:46 |
| 2. | "Int 3" | 1:44 |
| 3. | "Dutch Slaver" | 3:29 |
| 4. | "I Can't Get Next to You" | 4:43 |
| 5. | "Freshman Remix" | 4:09 |

Turn Records version

| No. | Title | Length |
|---|---|---|
| 1. | "Monkey vs. Shark" | 4:46 |
| 2. | "Int 3" | 1:44 |
| 3. | "Phineas Bogg" | 4:22 |
| 4. | "Dutch Slaver" | 3:29 |
| 5. | "I Can't Get Next to You" | 4:43 |
| 6. | "Freshman Remix" | 4:09 |
| 7. | "Deadbeat Water" | 4:43 |
