= Lala Lala =

Indie rock band from Chicago, Illinois

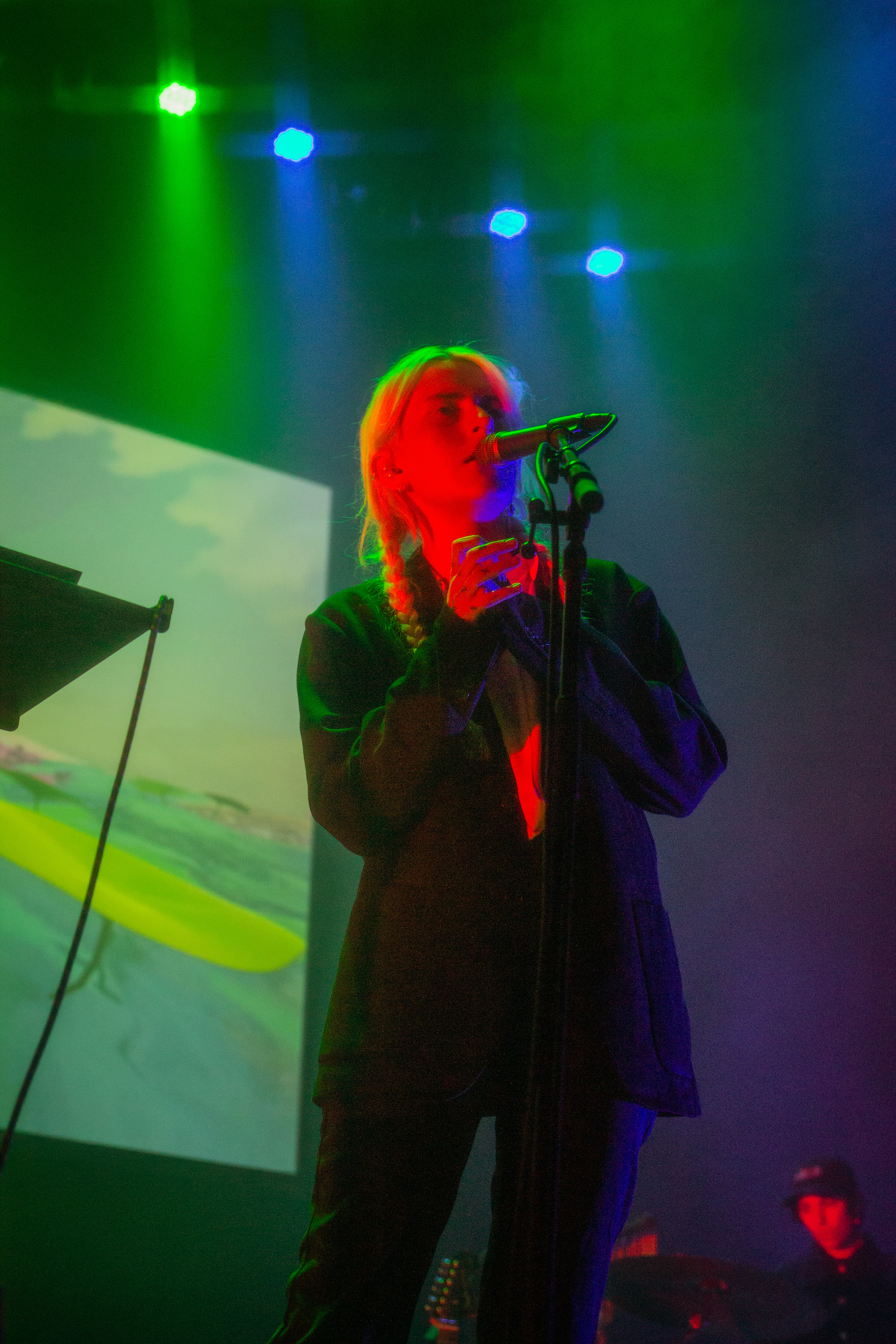
- Lala Lala performing in 2021

Background information
- Born: Lillie Amadea West
- Origin: Chicago, Illinois, U.S.
- Genre: Indie rock
- Years active: 2014–present
- Label: Hardly Art
- Website: lalabandlala.com

Lillie Amadea West, known professionally as Lala Lala, is an indie rock musician and songwriter based in Chicago.

== Early life ==
West was born in California, but was raised in London until she was twelve years old. Her father is filmmaker Simon West. She then moved with her family to Los Angeles and attended the Los Angeles County High School for the Arts. She attended the School of the Art Institute of Chicago; while enrolled, she became involved with the city's underground music scene. A long time fan of music, it was not until West began college that she would begin to create music of her own after being encouraged by a friend to purchase a guitar from Craigslist. She dropped out of college after "a year and two months", moving to Chicago full-time when she was 19.

== Career ==
Lala Lala's debut album, Sleepyhead, was self-released in 2016 and was followed up by their sophomore album titled The Lamb, which was released in September 2018 on Sub Pop imprint Hardly Art. Upon the announcement of the band's second album, Stereogum gave Lala Lala the prestigious recognition of "Band to Watch" in July 2018. The release of Lala Lala's sophomore album, The Lamb, was met with favorable reviews by various notable publications, including Pitchfork, whose review by Steven Arroyo states that "On her second album, Lillie West retains the charming simplicity of her songs, but she finds new depth as a songwriter as she explores the act of standing up to herself," awarding the album with a high numerical score as well.

In January 2019, Lala Lala released a single titled "Siren 042," a collaboration with Yoni Wolf, frontman of the American band WHY?, which was premiered on the Fader and was reviewed well by music outlets. A writer for NPR, Adelaide Sandstrom, praises the collaboration, "Siren 042," writing that the song displays West's "ability to offset sharp lyricism with shimmering guitar and singalong-worthy vocal refrains."

In March 2019, West set out on a nationwide tour opening for the Conor Oberst and Phoebe Bridgers duo Better Oblivion Community Center. Later in 2019, Lala Lala opened for Death Cab for Cutie on their U.S. Summer tour. It was announced that in July 2019, Lala Lala will perform at the Pitchfork Music Festival in Chicago

During the COVID-19 pandemic, Lala Lala contributed to a benefit compilation titled "The Song Is Coming From Inside The House." Organized by indie rock band Strange Ranger, proceeds from the 24-track album went to Groundswell's Rapid Response Fund, in order to support organizations led by women of color and transgender individuals.

In July 2021, Lala Lala released a single, "Diver," the first off her third album, I Want The Door To Open, which was released in October 2021. The album received positive reviews, with Pitchfork summarizing, "[p]airing her simple, unaffected vocal style with carefully synthesized arrangements, the Chicago-based musician departs from her indie-rock foundations in search of musical and personal freedom."

West released two new singles in 2023, "Hit Me Where It Hurts" in September, and "Armida" in November. In 2024, she released the instrumental album if i were a real man i would be able to break the neck of a suffering bird, which was written and recorded during a residency in Iceland and includes eight instrumental compositions. Of the album, West notes, "I hope that the music is able to invoke the rhythm, sway, and connection I felt with the landscape in Seyðisfjörður, as well as my ongoing attempt to communicate with the divine."

She signed with Sub Pop records in 2026.

== Personal life ==
As of January 2026, West lives in Los Angeles.

== Discography ==
=== Studio albums ===
- Sleepyhead (2016, self-released)
- The Lamb (2018, Hardly Art)
- I Want the Door to Open (2021, Hardly Art)
- if i were a real man i would be able to break the neck of a suffering bird as Lillie West (2024, Hardly Art)
- Heaven 2 (2026, Sub Pop)

=== EPs ===
- Lala Lala (2014, self-released)
- Have a Good Day (2015, self-released)

=== Singles ===
- "Siren 042" featuring WHY? (January 11, 2019)
- "Legs, Run" (January 21, 2020)
- "Fantasy Movie" b/w Valentine featuring Grapetooth (February 12, 2020)
- "€ € € €^^%%!!!!!heaven!!!!!!" featuring Baths (July 24, 2020)
- "Hit Me Where It Hurts"(September 27, 2023)
- "Armida" (November 9, 2023)
- "holyholyholy" (April 1, 2024)
