= Chill Guy =

2023 Internet meme and digital artwork

- The original artwork posted by Banks in 2023
- First appearance: October 4, 2023; 3 years ago
- Created by: Phillip Banks "philb"

In-universe information
- Nickname: My new character
- Species: Dog
- Gender: Male

Chill Guy, also known as My new character, is a digital artwork and Internet meme first posted by the American artist Phillip Banks on Twitter on October 4, 2023. The artwork consists of an anthropomorphic dog wearing a grey sweater, blue jeans, and red sneakers, giving off a chill expression by smirking with his hands in his pockets. While the artwork had some success after publishing, it only became viral about a year later on August 30, 2024, when a user on TikTok made a slideshow with the artwork, combining it with other popular memes at the time. In the following days, similar memes gained tens of millions of views, attracting the attention of larger corporations, including the German athletic apparel company Adidas, the food delivery service Uber Eats, and the Indian political party BJP, who used the artwork in their promotions.

The artwork became viral a second time on November 21, 2024, primarily on TikTok, inspiring the meme coin $CHILLGUY which rapidly rose to a market cap of US$580 million, driven in part by a post by Salvadorian president Nayib Bukele on Twitter in support of the coin. The resulting popularity of the coin and other unauthorized use of the artwork for commercial gain led Banks to copyright the artwork and issue notice and take downs of "unauthorized merchandise and shitcoins" trying to make a profit, not including fanart or brands using it in the trends. Following the announcement, the coin dropped to about half of what it was worth, and Banks was subsequently doxed, prompting him to set his Twitter account to private to avoid further harassment.

According to some media outlets, the meme likely resonated online as it was regarded as a playful but relatable piece which encourages people to seek self-help, remain stress-free, and approach life with an easygoing attitude. The artwork was regarded as one of the top memes of 2024 by the American newspaper USA Today and the Indian digital media company ScoopWhoop.

== Description ==
The artwork was created by the North Carolinian artist Phillip Banks, which according to Banks' Tumblr account, is a pseudonym. It consists of a brown dog with a human figure, wearing a grey crew neck sweater, blue jeans, and dirty red Converse shoes. He is smirking with his hands in his pocket, with the caption written by Banks that he is a "chill guy". His design was misreported to be based on a cross between the 1990s American cartoon Arthur and the character Charlie from the American adult animated television show Smiling Friends, but according to Banks, he was not based on anything in particular. As for the artwork's name, Banks tweeted on September 2, 2024, that he disliked the use of the name My new character as opposed to Chill Guy, which was his original intention for the piece.

== History ==
On October 4, 2023, Banks posted the original image on Twitter with the caption "my new character. his whole deal is he's a chill guy that lowkey doesn't give a fuck" [sic]. He later posted the same artwork on Instagram Reels. The artwork was soon used in many memes following its publishing, inspiring Banks to create an additional piece he called Unchill Gal or My old character, based on Chill Guy, which he drew with an opposite color palette as well as more serious and less-carefree expressions. Chill Guy only became viral later on August 30, 2024, however, when a TikTok user under the username .blitzerzz made a slideshow with the artwork, utilizing other memes at the time, including the Roddy Ricch song "Ricch Forever", and the American adult animated sitcom Family Guy. Another edit made on TikTok on September 4, 2024, using a quote from the American television series Dexter, gained over 4.5 million views, and a repost the following day gaining over 13.8 million views. Similar edits in the following days using "chill quotes" from other mainstream televisions saw similar success, especially on TikTok and Twitter. According to the Indian English-language newspaper Times Now News, the meme likely resonated online because it was a playful but relatable piece which "encourag[es] people to focus on themselves", remain stress-free, and approach life with a "laid-back attitude", alongside other relatable self-help. Between the two social media platforms, the original posts by Banks have received over 100 thousand likes and over ten thousand reposts. Cosplay and fanart of the artwork also appeared online, inspiring some Halloween costumes later in the year.

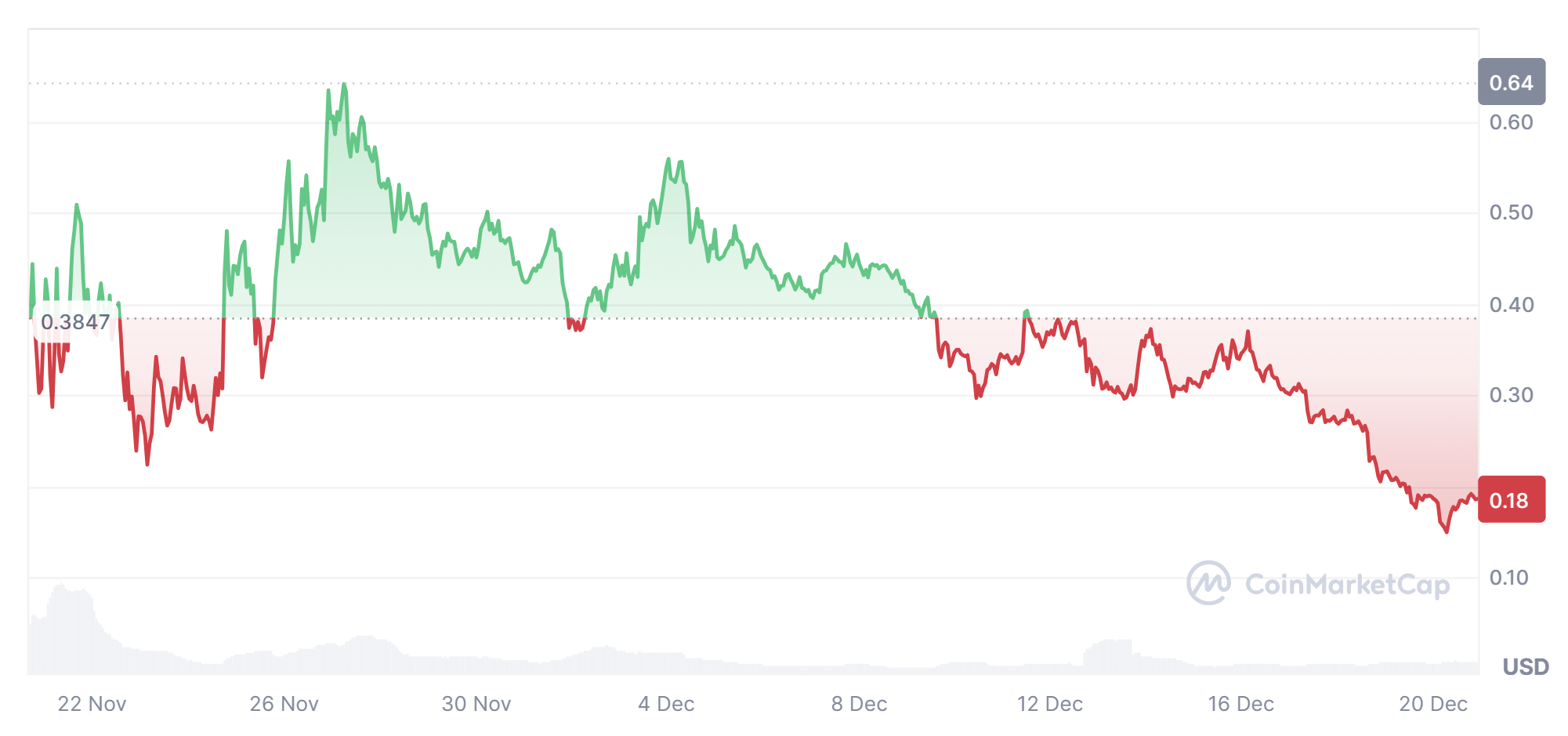
$CHILLGUY meme coin value after its first month from November 20 to December 20, 2024

On November 21, 2024, the artwork made a third major resurgence online, in part due to a meme coin inspired by the artwork named $CHILLGUY reaching a maximum $580 million market cap for trading on the platform Solana. The meme coin, which was launched on Solana earlier on November 15, was made by anonymous creators without permission from Banks. The coin's growth was driven in part by a post from Salvadoran president Nayib Bukele on his official Twitter account, social media trends on TikTok, and a fear of missing out. Another reason credited to the artwork's increased in popularity came after the creation of Chill Girl on November 17 by the TikTok user Stopscrolling_22, which features Chill Guy with superimposed long hair. The result was a sudden spike of memes using the artwork on social media, which saw a greater focus on male mental health. Large corporations and entities, including the German athletic apparel company Adidas, the Indian political party BJP, the Hong Kong phone case company Casetify, the American basketball bracket March Madness, the American football channel NFL on CBS, the European distributor for Sprite, and the food delivery service Uber Eats all used the artwork in their own posts.

Despite the success of the artwork, Banks wrote on his Twitter account on November 21, 2024, that he had copyrighted it. Banks further stated he had issued notice and take downs against "mainly unauthorized merchandise and shitcoins" using the artwork for profit; stating "I do not, and will never, endorse or condone any crypto-related projects involving my work," but clarified this did not impact brand accounts using the artwork as a trend. Soon after issuing the notice, Banks was subsequently doxed, prompting him to set his Twitter account to private to avoid further harassment. These controversies caused the price of $CHILLGUY coin to drop to about half of what it was worth before ($220 million). Later controversies which claimed the artwork was plagiarized from a Vietnamese magazine, and another which claimed it was being used as a hate symbol, were both proven to be hoaxes shortly after surfacing in December 2024.

== Legacy ==
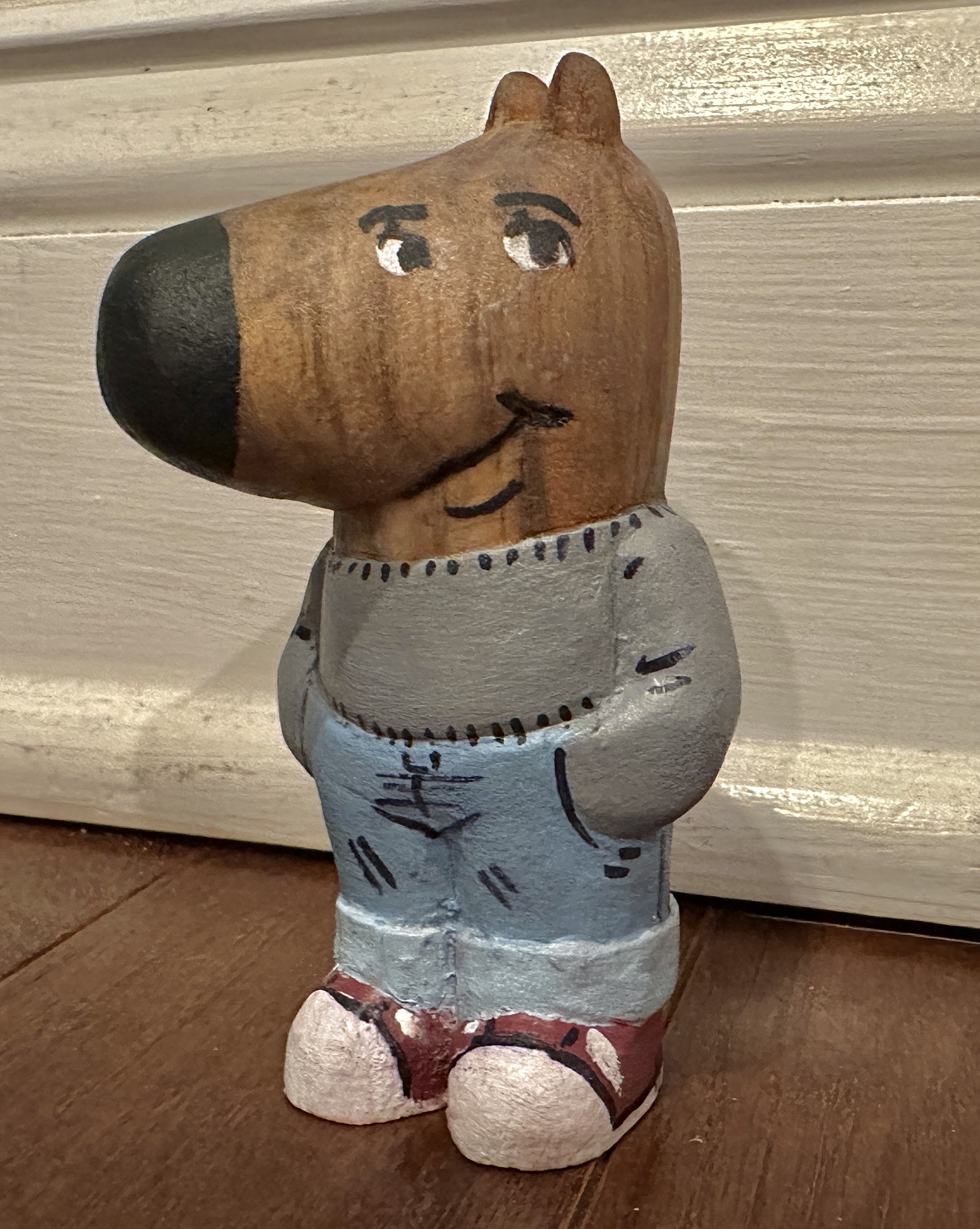
A painted wood carving of the artwork

At the end of 2024, the artwork was regarded as one of the top ten best memes of 2024 by the American newspaper USA Today, and one of the top eight best by the Indian digital media company ScoopWhoop. The piano piece "Hinoki Wood" by Gia Margaret, often paired with the meme on social media, peaked at the number two spot of the TikTok Billboard Top 50 for the week of December 7, 2024. A sample of "Hinoki Wood" was used by the hip hop group 41 to make their song "Chill Guy", named after the artwork. The song, which had a "laid-back" tone compared to the drill music the group traditionally made, became one of their most successful, and was partially responsible for inspiring them to switch away from drill.

Sometime after the immediate controversies surrounding $CHILLGUY, Banks began the sale of plush toys of the artwork, including a collaboration with Canadian collectables company Youtooz. From April 11 to May 5, 2025, a Chill Guy-themed pop-up retail existed at Festival Walk shopping center in Hong Kong. The event, which claimed to be official, included inflatables and sculptures of the artwork, as well as sold clothing and collectable items with the artwork on it.

== See also ==
- Digital painting
- List of Internet phenomena
