= Moh Lhean =

Studio album by Why?
- Released: March 3, 2017
- Studio: El Armando, Cincinnati; Moh Lhean, Cincinnati
- Genre: Indie rock; hip hop
- Length: 33:40
- Label: Joyful Noise
- Producer: Josiah Wolf; Yoni Wolf

Why? chronology
Golden Tickets (2013)	Moh Lhean (2017)	AOKOHIO (2019)

Professional ratings
Aggregate scores
Source	Rating
Metacritic	79/100
Review scores
Source	Rating
AllMusic	4/5 stars
Drowned in Sound	7/10
Exclaim!	8/10
Pitchfork	7.7/10
PopMatters	8/10 stars

Moh Lhean is the sixth studio album by American band Why?. It was released by Joyful Noise Recordings on March 3, 2017.

== Critical reception ==
At Metacritic, which assigns a weighted average score out of 100 to reviews from mainstream critics, Moh Lhean received an average score of 79 based on 14 reviews, indicating "generally favorable reviews".

Paul Carr of PopMatters gave the album 8 stars out of 10, commenting that "As with the band's previous albums, it is exceptionally difficult to categorize their sound as it veers from psychedelia to folk to pop all with an undercurrent of hip-hop." Marcy Donelson of AllMusic gave the album 4 stars out of 5, saying, "The project remains a creative burst of sounds, grooves, and stylized observation that's uniquely refreshing to those open to its quirky complexity."

== Track listing ==
All tracks are written by Yoni Wolf, except where noted.

No.	Title	Writer(s)	Length
1.	"This Ole King"	Yoni Wolf; Josiah Wolf; Doug McDiarmid; Matt Meldon	4:38
2.	"Proactive Evolution"		4:37
3.	"Easy"		3:09
4.	"January February March"		0:40
5.	"One Mississippi"		4:38
6.	"The Longing Is All"	Y. Wolf; J. Wolf; McDiarmid	1:09
7.	"George Washington"		3:09
8.	"The Water"		3:22
9.	"Consequence of Nonaction"		3:21
10.	"The Barely Blur"		4:57

== Personnel ==
Credits adapted from the album's liner notes.

- Yoni Wolf – lead vocals, piano, keyboards, drums, percussion, production, mixing, artwork
- Josiah Wolf – drums, percussion, production, mixing
- Doug McDiarmid – bass guitar, guitars, keyboards
- Matt Meldon – guitars, slide guitar, ukulele
- Ben Sloan – drums, percussion
- Josh Fink – double bass
- Liz Wolf – vocals
- Molly Sullivan – vocals
- Ofir Klemperor – synthesizers
- Johnny Ruzsa – flutes
- Aaron Weiss – vocals
- Alex Cobb – ambience
- Millie Mason – vocals, guitar
- Genevieve Guimond – cello
- Dave McDonnell – contra-alto clarinet, saxophone
- CJ Boyd – double bass
- Ryan Lott – vocals
- Pete Lyman – mastering
- Scott Fredette – cover art
- Chris Doddy – covert art
- David Woodruff – layout design

== Charts ==
Chart (2017)	Peak position
US Heatseekers Albums (Billboard)	6
US Independent Albums (Billboard)	19
US Vinyl Albums (Billboard)	17
