= Why? (American band) =

American band

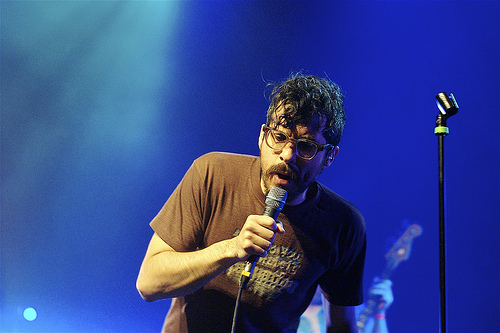
- Yoni Wolf of Why? performing in Brussels in 2010

Background information
- Origin: Berkeley, California, U.S. Cincinnati, Ohio, U.S.
- Genres: Indie rock; alternative hip hop; alternative rock
- Years active: 2004–present
- Labels: Anticon; City Slang; Joyful Noise
- Members: Yoni Wolf; Doug McDiarmid; Matt Meldon; Josiah Wolf; Mol Sullivan
- Website: www.whywithaquestionmark.com/

Why? (styled as WHY?) is an American alternative hip hop and indie rock band. The band was founded in 2004 by Cincinnati rapper and singer Yoni Wolf, who had been using Why? as his stage name since 1997. In addition to Wolf, who serves as lead vocalist and multi-instrumentalist, the band consists of multi-instrumentalists and backing vocalists Doug McDiarmid and Matt Meldon, and drummer and backing vocalist Josiah Wolf, who is Yoni Wolf's older brother.

Why? has released eight studio albums, along with several extended plays, demo albums, and live albums, since their inception. Yoni Wolf's final solo album under the Why? moniker, 2003's Oaklandazulasylum, is typically considered part of the band's discography. Their first album as a full band was 2005's Elephant Eyelash. They followed this album with Alopecia (2008), Eskimo Snow (2009), Mumps, Etc. (2012), Moh Lhean (2017), AOKOHIO (2019), and The Well I Fell Into (2024).

== History ==
In 2004, Yoni Wolf enlisted his older brother Josiah, Doug McDiarmid, and Matt Meldon and formed Why?. At this time, he stopped using 'Why?' as his personal stage name.

Why? released their debut full-band album Elephant Eyelash in 2005. The album deviated considerably from the sound of Yoni Wolf's final solo project under the Why? moniker, the 2003 album Oaklandazulasylum, expanding to the sound of a full indie rock band. The group toured much of 2005 in support of the album as a four-piece. By the time of their May 2006 tour with Islands, the group had become a three-piece because Matt Meldon moved to San Juan Island off the coast of Washington to live with his girlfriend. In 2008, the group added bassist Austin Brown to their lineup, making them a four-piece once again.

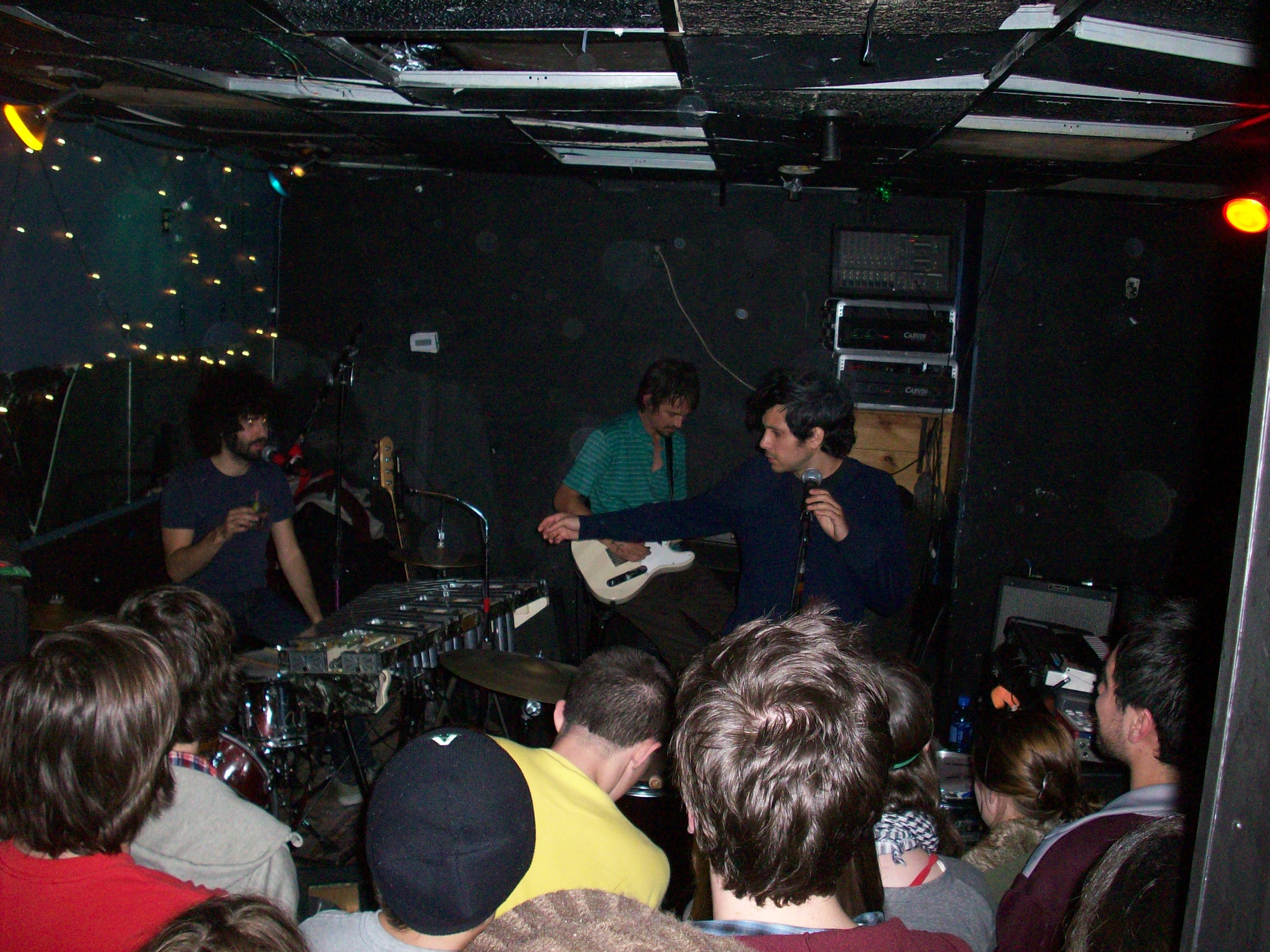
Why? performing a live show at Cafe Bourbon Street in Columbus, Ohio in 2008

For their third album, Alopecia, Why? asked the fans to contribute photographs of their palms for the album's artwork. They released "The Hollows" as the first single with two different European and US versions, featuring remixes and covers by Boards of Canada, Xiu Xiu, Dntel, Half-handed Cloud, Dump and Islands. Alopecia was released in 2008 to very positive reviews. An image of the poster for Alopecia appears in It's Always Sunny in Philadelphia.

In 2009, Why? released their fourth album Eskimo Snow. The ten songs on the album were recorded during the Alopecia sessions and are described by Yoni Wolf as "the least hip-hop out of anything I've ever been involved with."

On June 27, 2012, the band announced via Stereogum that they would be releasing their new EP Sod in the Seed on August 13 on City Slang. In the same article, they premiered the title track. The song is more upbeat than any of the tracks on Eskimo Snow and contains rapping, which had been absent on the previous album.

Mumps, Etc., their fifth album, was released on October 9, 2012.

In 2013, the band released an EP entitled Golden Tickets on the Joyful Noise label. They described it as "a collection of personalized 'theme songs' for and about seven specific WHY? fans. Over the course of several months, Yoni and Josiah Wolf internet-stalked these fans for the purpose of crafting musical homages which would end up on this album." The band's sixth album, Moh Lhean, was released on March 3, 2017. Their album The Well I Fell Into was released on August 2, 2024.

== Band members ==
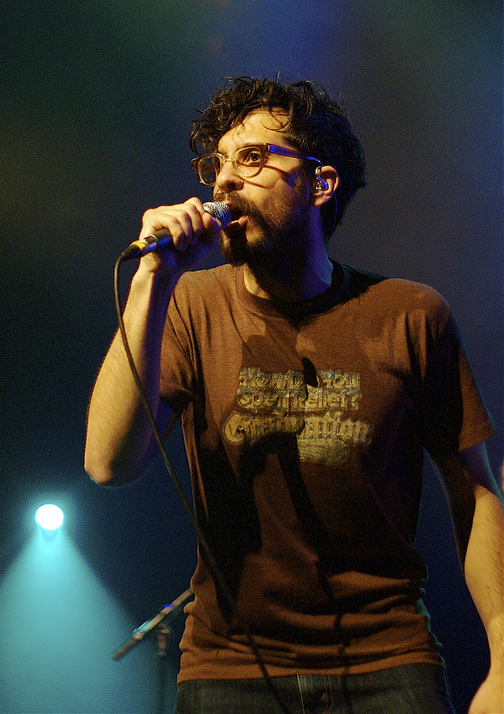
Yoni Wolf of Why? performing in Brussels in 2010

- Yoni Wolf – lead vocals, keyboards, synthesizers, piano, samples, programming, bass guitar, percussion (2004–present)
- Doug McDiarmid – keyboards, synthesizers, piano, guitars, bass guitar, backing vocals (2004–present)
- Josiah Wolf – drums, percussion, keyboards, synthesizers, samples, backing vocals (2004–present)
- Mol Sullivan – guitars, keyboards, synthesizers, backing vocals (2024–present)

== Other projects ==
Yoni Wolf has released many albums as a member of groups including Clouddead, Reaching Quiet, and Hymie's Basement. From 1997 to 2003, he released numerous solo projects and collaborated extensively with Doseone. Yoni Wolf has also produced tracks for other rappers. He produced several tracks for fellow Anticon co-founder Pedestrian's album Volume One: UnIndian Songs in 2005. He also produced several tracks for Serengeti's album Family and Friends, as well as providing backup vocals, in 2011.

In 2005, Doug McDiarmid released a solo EP under the name J.D. Wenceslas.

In 2003, Josiah Wolf released his debut solo EP entitled The Josiah EP. In 2010, he released his first solo album, Jet Lag on Anticon.

== Discography ==
=== Albums ===
- Elephant Eyelash (2005)
- Alopecia (2008)
- Eskimo Snow (2009)
- Mumps, Etc. (2012)
- Moh Lhean (2017)
- AOKOHIO (2019)
- The Well I Fell Into (2024)

=== EPs ===
- Sanddollars (2005)
- Rubber Traits EP (2006)
- Sod in the Seed (2012)
- Golden Tickets (2013)

=== Demo albums ===
- Alopecia: The Demos!! (2008)
- Eskimo Snow Demos (2009)
- Mumps, Etc. Etc.: The Demos 2007-2011 (2012)

=== Singles ===
- "Dumb Hummer" (2006)
- "The Hollows" (2007)
- "Waterlines" (2013)
- "This Ole King" (2016)
