= Gia Margaret =

American singer-songwriter

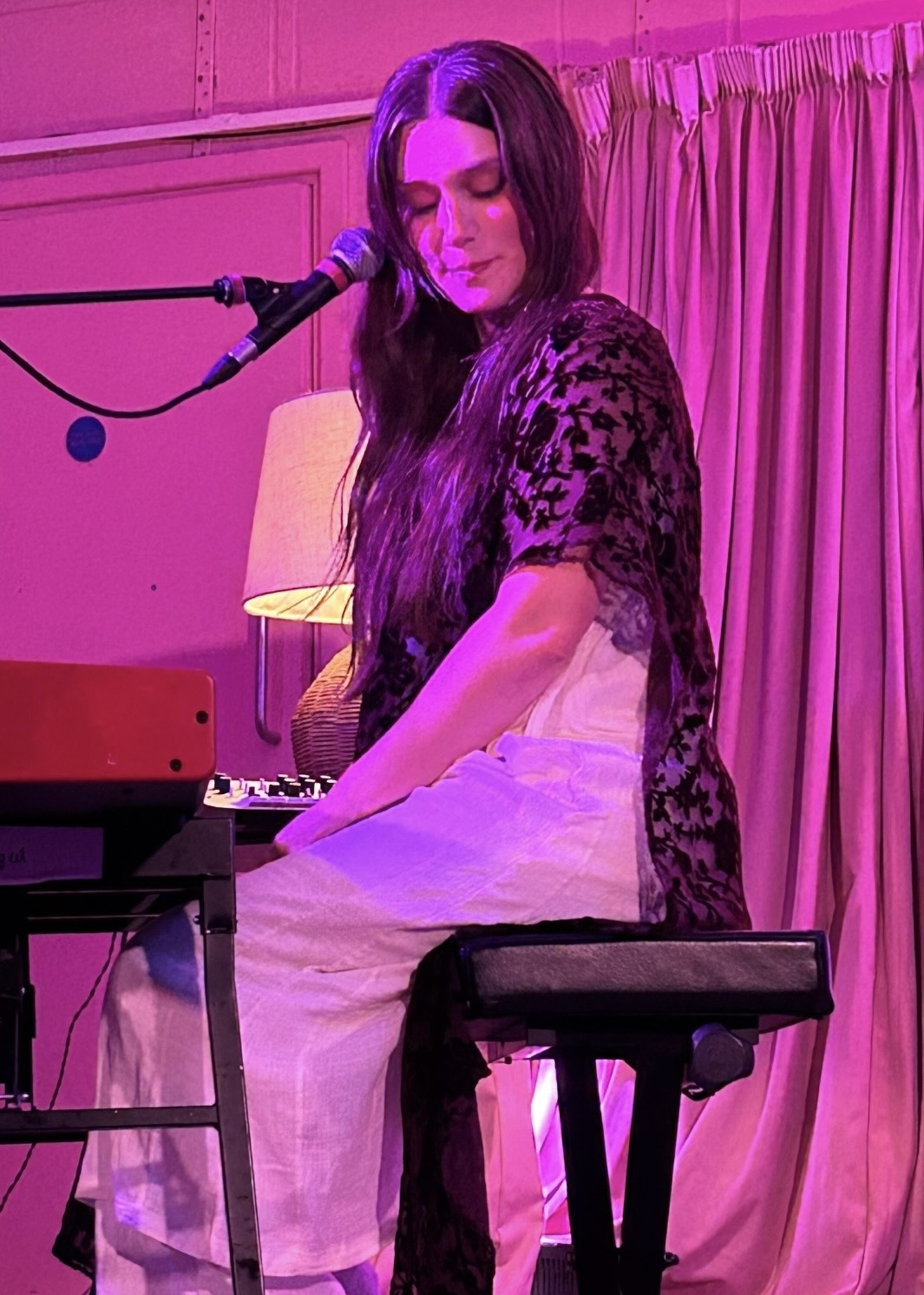
- Margaret performing at the Pink Room at Yes in Manchester, England, 2023

Background information
- Born: 1987 or 1988 (age 37–38); Chicago, Illinois, U.S.
- Genres: Ambient; indie folk
- Occupations: Singer-songwriter; record producer
- Instruments: Vocals; keyboards; guitar
- Years active: 2017–present
- Labels: Jagjaguwar; Dalliance

Gia Margaret (born 1987 or 1988) is an American singer-songwriter and record producer from Chicago, Illinois. She released her debut studio album, There's Always Glimmer, in July 2018. She is currently signed to Jagjaguwar Records.

== Early life ==
She was trained in classical piano as a child and began pursuing a degree in music before ending both endeavors because they were "creatively limiting". Margaret held various jobs prior to becoming a musician, including a nanny, book store clerk, and dental assistant.

== Career ==
=== 2018–2019: There's Always Glimmer ===
Margaret released her debut studio album, There's Always Glimmer in 2018. This album was re-released on May 24, 2019 with two additional tracks, "Smoke (Acoustic)" and "Babies". Beyond her studio album, she released an Audiotree live album on November 14, 2018 that included live performances of six songs. Margaret's song "Birthday" was remixed by artists Ryan Hemsworth and swim good now and released on streaming services on September 3, 2019. Margaret has two record labels, Orindal in the United States and Dalliance in the UK. While touring with Novo Amor, the two artists recorded and released two songs, "Lucky for You" and "No Fun", on February 28, 2019. In 2019, she toured around the United States with Welsh alternative folk singer-songwriter Novo Amor. In September of that year, she went on her first headlining tour in the UK. Margaret was selected to perform at SXSW 2019, a music festival in Austin, Texas, and was later selected by NPR to be part of the Austin 100. This is a playlist of "a hundred handpicked highlights from among the thousands of acts playing SXSW 2019".

=== 2020–2022: Mia Gargaret ===
On June 12, 2020, she released her second studio album, Mia Gargaret. While touring her previous studio album There's Always Glimmer in 2019, Margaret lost her voice due to illness and was forced to cancel her remaining tour dates. This resulted in experimentation with ambient synthesizer meditations that came to comprise Mia Gargaret; there are no vocals featured on the record, excluding the final track. In 2023 Ray Ban used "apathy" as the song in their video featuring tennis star Coco Gauff for their Ray Ban X Meta product line.

=== 2023-2025: Romantic Piano ===
On April 26, 2023, Margaret announced her third studio album, Romantic Piano, and released the lead single "Hinoki Wood" alongside "Cicadas", another song featured on the album. The album was released on May 26, 2023, with 12 total tracks. Like her previous studio album, all songs were instrumental, with the exception of "City Song". In November 2024, "Hinoki Wood" became an internet sensation due to associations with the viral meme "Chill Guy". In 2024, Apple used Hinoki Wood as the song for their Apple "smart glasses" product in a TikTok Ad. In 2025 Atlanta's Rap group TaTa released a music video for their song "Chill Guy" rapping over Gia Margaret's Hinoki Wood.

=== 2026-present: Singing ===
On February 4, 2026, she released "Everyone Around Me Dancing", the lead single to her fourth album, Singing. The album released on April 24, 2026. The album featured Margaret's first vocal performances since a 2019 illness that damaged her vocal cords.

== Artistry ==
She describes the genre of her music as "sleep rock", and has been compared to artists including Imogen Heap, the Postal Service, Nick Drake, and Broken Social Scene.

== Discography ==
- There's Always Glimmer (2018)
- Mia Gargaret (2020)
- Romantic Piano (2023)
- Singing (2026)
