= Oaklandazulasylum =

Studio album by Why?
- Released: June 16, 2003
- Genre: Indie rock; alternative hip hop; sound collage
- Length: 38:30
- Label: Anticon
- Producer: Why?, Jel

Why? chronology
Miss Ohio's Nameless (2001)	Oaklandazulasylum (2003)	Early Whitney (2003)

Professional ratings
Aggregate scores
Source	Rating
Metacritic	70/100
Review scores
Source	Rating
AllMusic	2.5/5 stars
Dusted Magazine	favorable
Pitchfork	8.1/10
Prefix	7/10
Stylus Magazine	A−

Oaklandazulasylum is a studio album by Yoni Wolf under the Why? moniker. It was released by Anticon on June 16, 2003. It peaked at number 85 on the CMJ Radio 200 chart. While it was not a full-band Why? record, the band now count it as part of their discography.

== Critical reception ==
At Metacritic, which assigns a weighted average score out of 100 to reviews from mainstream critics, the album received an average score of 70% based on 8 reviews, indicating "generally favorable reviews".

No Ripchord placed it at number 32 on the "Top 50 Albums of 2003" list. Stylus Magazine contributor Ethan White later said the album had an "anything-goes sound collage aesthetic" which made it "an engaging adventure, all the more charming for its faults. Some found it scattered, but to my ears the variety of the material meant that lackluster moments were easily absorbed into the rough-edged jumble that made up the whole."

== Track listing ==
All tracks are written by Jonathan "Yoni" Wolf, except "Our Neighbor's Daughter" by Wolf and Jel.

No.	Title	Length
1.	"Ferriswheel"	2:24
2.	"Cold Lunch (Albert Brown Mortuary Dumpster Dive Remix)"	1:36
3.	"Afterschool America"	1:19
4.	"Our Neighbor's Daughter"	1:44
5.	"A Little Titanic"	3:32
6.	"Weak Moon"	2:14
7.	"Early Whitney"	4:03
8.	"Dream on Cortelyou"	2:55
9.	"Women Eye, 'No.'"	1:32
10.	"Dirty Glass"	3:27
11.	"Shirtless, Sheetless, And..."	1:59
12.	"Bad Entropy"	5:02
13.	"Seventeen"	2:33
14.	"Ape in Cage with Wire Cutters"	4:08

== Personnel ==
Credits adapted from liner notes.

- Jonathan "Yoni" Wolf – vocals, production
- Jel – co-production (1, 4), drums (14)
- Odd Nosdam – sampler (11), art direction, photography
- Josiah Wolf – bass guitar (11)
- Doug McDiarmid – guitar (12)
- Alex Kort – cello (14)
