= Reaching Quiet =

American band

- Origin: Oakland, California, United States
- Genre: Alternative hip-hop
- Years active: 2000–2002
- Label: Mush Records
- Members: Why? Odd Nosdam
- Website: mushrecords.com/artist/40

Reaching Quiet was an American alternative hip-hop duo. It consisted of Why? and Odd Nosdam. The duo released one album, In the Shadow of the Living Room, on Mush Records in 2002.

In 2001, Split EP! was released on Anticon. It contains Why?'s "You'll Know Where Your Plane Is..." and Odd Nosdam's "EAT." It features guest appearances from Mr. Dibbs.

Why? and Odd Nosdam were also members of cLOUDDEAD along with Doseone.

== Discography ==
=== Albums ===
- In the Shadow of the Living Room (2002)

=== Compilation appearances ===
- "113th Clean" on Ropeladder 12 (2000)
