= Hymie's Basement =

American indie rock duo

- Origin: Oakland, California; Minneapolis, Minnesota
- Genres: Alternative hip hop, indie rock
- Years active: 2002–present
- Labels: Lex Records
- Members: Yoni Wolf; Andrew Broder

Hymie's Basement is an American indie rock duo. It consists of Yoni Wolf and Andrew Broder of Fog. They released one album, Hymie's Basement, on Lex Records in 2003. The name Hymies Basement came from the album being recording in the basement of Hymies Record store in Minneapolis, Minnesota which Broder's wife co-owned at the time.

They combine elements of rap, folk and indie rock. Songs range from the happy pop like chorus of "21st Century Pop Song" and the minimal sadness of "Lightning Bolts and Man Hands."

== Discography ==
- Hymie's Basement (Lex Records, 2003)
