= Thee More Shallows =

American indie rock band

- Origin: San Francisco, California, US
- Genres: Indie rock, experimental rock
- Years active: 2001-present
- Labels: Anticon, Monotreme, Turn, Megalon
- Members: Dee Kesler; Chavo Fraser; Jason Gonzales
- Past members: Tadas Kisielius

Thee More Shallows is a three-piece experimental indie rock band based in San Francisco, California. It was formed in 2001. The band consists of Dee (ne David) Kesler, Chavo Fraser and Jason Gonzales.

== History ==
The three musicians who would come to constitute Thee More Shallows met for the first time at a concert in 2001, where they were all playing with different groups. Songwriter Dee Kesler at the time was in a band called Shackleton along with Tadas Kisielius, and the two of them became the founding members of the group originally known as simply Thee Shallows. Tadas soon moved away, however, and so Kesler brought in Jason Gonzales of the Cubby Creatures and Chavo Fraser, both of whom were performing as drummers at the time.

It was in a basement room in the Tenderloin District of San Francisco that the band began work on their debut album, A History of Sport Fishing. It was both composed and recorded in a two-week period during which the band would work only in the early hours of the morning. The final product was released in 2002, originally under Thee Shallows until the band were forced to change their name after a call from an attorney. It showcased classical influences as well as laying down the foundation of the groups mellow, textured sound. The album was released on Megalon Records and received very little promotion in the United States, while it was given a big push by Monotreme Records in the United Kingdom, and this led to the band becoming more popular in Europe than in their home country.

The band returned from their promotional tour filled with determination, soon building their own studio in Oakland in order to set about recording the follow-up. But this was a task which would come to occupy them for the next two years as they painstakingly recorded each track to their own satisfaction. The final result of this lengthy process was More Deep Cuts which came out in 2004 in the UK once again on Monotreme Records. In 2005 the band decided to go with Turn Records for the US release after struggling to find a dedicated label for their music. The band also released a UK-only promotional EP for this album called Cuts Plus Two, which featured two songs from the album along with two unreleased tracks.

They followed this up with the Monkey vs. Shark EP in 2006. One of the tracks on this release was a remix of one of their earlier songs by members of the San Francisco-based Anticon label, who the band eventually decided to sign with for their third studio album, Book of Bad Breaks, which came out in April 2007. This album, like their previous efforts, was met with a favorable critical response.

== Style ==
The key elements of their sound usually consist of soft, whispered introspective vocals against a backdrop of finger-picked guitar and synthesized elements, with influences ranging from classical to electronica.

== Side projects ==
Kesler and Gonzales are also in Ral Partha Vogelbacher, while Fops is a collaboration between lyricist Chadwick Donald Bidwell of Ral Partha Vogelbacher and singer Dee Kesler. Kesler co-produced and played trumpet on "If Found" from Sinombre's debut album Curves of Sirens.

== Discography ==
=== Studio albums ===
| Date | Title | Record label |
|---|---|---|
| May 7, 2002 | A History of Sport Fishing | Megalon Records; Monotreme Records |
| September 20, 2004 (UK); July 12, 2005 (US) | More Deep Cuts | Monotreme Records; Turn Records |
| April 27, 2007 | Book of Bad Breaks | Anticon |
| May 28, 2021 | Dad Jams | Monotreme Records |

=== EPs ===
| Date | Title | Record label |
|---|---|---|
| May 9, 2005 | Cuts Plus Two | Monotreme Records |
| April 3, 2006 | Monkey vs. Shark | Monotreme Records |
