= Yoni Wolf =

American singer

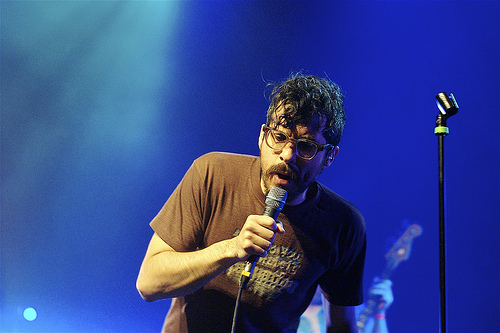
- Yoni Wolf performing with Why? in Brussels in 2010

Background information
- Also known as: Why? (1997–present)
- Born: Jonathan Avram Wolf; April 30, 1979 (age 47); Cincinnati, Ohio, U.S.
- Genres: Alternative hip hop; underground hip hop; indie rock
- Years active: 1997–present
- Labels: Anticon; Mush; Lex
- Website: www.whywithaquestionmark.com/

Jonathan Avram "Yoni" Wolf (born April 30, 1979) is an American alternative hip hop and indie rock musician and co-founder of the record label Anticon.

From 1997 until 2004, Wolf released music under the stage name Why?. In 2004 he transferred that name onto his newly founded band. Thereafter he has been credited for his solo work as Yoni Wolf.

Prior to the founding of the band Why? in 2004, Wolf had also been a member of numerous other groups, including Greenthink, Object Beings, Clouddead, Reaching Quiet and Hymie's Basement.

== History ==
Wolf was born in Cincinnati, Ohio to Messianic Jewish parents. Before his first year in high school, he discovered an old 4-track in his father's synagogue and began to experiment musically. His forays into rapping, drumming, and poetry followed.

In 1997, while attending art school at the University of Cincinnati, Wolf met fellow student Adam Drucker, aka Doseone, at the semifinals of Scribble Jam. Along with Doseone, Mr. Dibbs and his brother Josiah Wolf, he formed the live improvisational group Apogee. The partnership of Wolf and Doseone continued for many years under many guises.

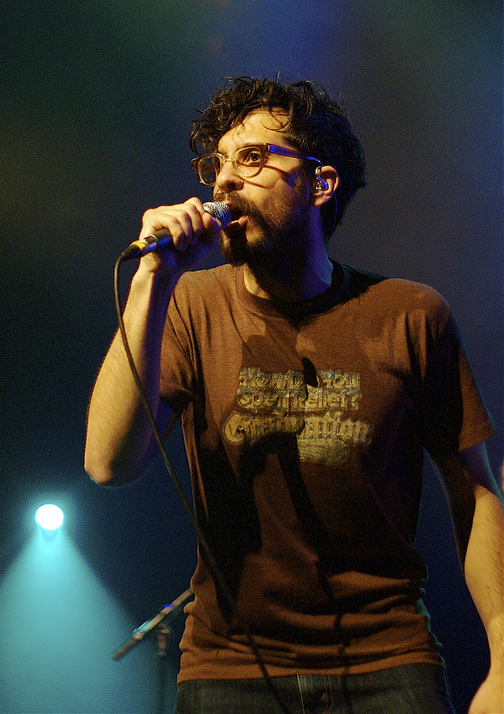
Yoni Wolf performing with Why? in Brussels in 2010

In 1998 the duo released the album It's Not Easy Being... under the name Greenthink. In 1999, with an expansive roster of featured guests, they released the second Greenthink record Blindfold, after which they expanded to a trio with the addition of producer Odd Nosdam and adopted the name Clouddead. In the same year Wolf released his first solo album under the name Why?, entitled Part Time People Cage... or Part Time Key?.

Beginning in 2000, Clouddead released a series of six 10" vinyl singles on Mush Records. In 2001 these singles were compiled on CD and released as the group's self-titled debut album.

Following the release of his album Oaklandazulasylum in 2003, Wolf enlisted Josiah Wolf on drums, Matt Meldon on guitar, and Doug McDiarmid as a multi-instrumentalist. Wolf decided to transfer his alias onto the new band, and Why? was officially formed.

In 2005, Why? released their debut album Elephant Eyelash. The album deviated considerably from the sound of Wolf's prior solo work. The group toured much of 2005 in support of the album as a four-piece. However, by the time of their May 2006 tour with Islands, the group had become a three-piece, as Meldon moved to an island off the coast of Seattle to live with his girlfriend.

For their second album Alopecia, Why? asked their fans to contribute photographs of their palms for the album's artwork. They released "The Hollows" as the first single, with two different European and US versions, featuring remixes and covers by Boards of Canada, Xiu Xiu, Dntel, Half-handed Cloud, Dump and Islands. Alopecia was released in 2008 to very positive reviews.

In 2009, Why? released their third album Eskimo Snow. The ten songs on the album were recorded during the Alopecia sessions and are described by Wolf as "the least hip-hop out of anything I've ever been involved with."

On June 27, 2012, the band announced via Stereogum that they would be releasing their new EP Sod in the Seed on August 13 on City Slang. In the same article they premiered the title track. The song is more upbeat than any of the tracks on Eskimo Snow and contains rapping, which had been absent on the previous album. The band released their fourth album, Mumps, Etc. on October 9, 2012.

Wolf often collaborates with rapper Serengeti. Between 2011 and 2012, Wolf produced and co-produced Serengeti's albums, Family & Friends and C.A.R. In 2016, the duo toured under the name Yoni & Geti after the release of their album Testarossa. Subsequently, Wolf returned to writing, producing, and touring with his original band Why?. The group released their critically acclaimed album Moh Lhean in 2017 and AOKOHIO in 2019. The band attracts audiences across the US due to a moderately-sized, extremely loyal fan base. While touring, Wolf interviews friends and artists for his podcast, The Wandering Wolf.

== Collaborations ==
Wolf has produced tracks for other MCs. He produced several tracks for fellow Anticon co-founder Pedestrian's album Volume One: UnIndian Songs in 2005. He also produced several tracks for Serengeti's album Family and Friends, as well as providing backup vocals, in 2011. Wolf's collaboration with Serengeti continued through 2016 with the release of their joint-album Testarossa. Wolf produced Lala Lala's 2021 album I Want The Door To Open. He has released singles with Lala Lala, Foxing, and several other bands.

Wolf has released many albums as a member of groups including Reaching Quiet, Hymie's Basement, Miss Ohio's Nameless and Object Beings. He has collaborated with Doseone, Odd Nosdam, Fog among others. In 2017, he convinced his label to put out The Ophelias' debut LP, and he produced their sophomore LP, Almost, the following year which was also released on Joyful Noise.

== Personal life ==
Wolf has Crohn's disease and many of his lyrics describe his efforts to cope with the illness.

== Selected discography ==
=== Albums ===
Solo

- Part Time People Cage... or Part Time Key? (1999) (as Why?)
- Oaklandazulasylum (2003) (as Why?)

Why?

- Elephant Eyelash (2005)
- Alopecia (2008)
- Eskimo Snow (2009)
- Mumps, Etc. (2012)
- Moh Lhean (2017)
- AOKOHIO (2019)
- The Well I Fell Into (2024)
- Oh Golly / Yes Lord (2026)

Clouddead (Yoni Wolf with Doseone & Odd Nosdam)

- Clouddead (2001)
- Ten (2004)

Greenthink (Yoni Wolf with Doseone)

- It's Not Easy Being... (1998)
- Blindfold (1999)

Other collaborations

- Object Beings (2001) (with Doseone & Pedestrian, as Object Beings)
- In the Shadow of the Living Room (2002) (with Odd Nosdam, as Reaching Quiet)
- Hymie's Basement (2003) (with Andrew Broder, as Hymie's Basement)
- Divorcee (2014) (with Anna Stewart, as Divorcee)
- Testarossa (2016) (with Serengeti, as Yoni & Geti)
