= Josiah Wolf =

American drummer

- Born: Cincinnati, Ohio
- Genres: Indie rock
- Occupations: Singer, multi-instrumentalist
- Years active: 2001–present
- Label: Anticon
- Member of: Why?

Josiah Wolf is a drummer and vocalist from Cincinnati, Ohio. He is best known as the drummer, percussionist, and backing vocalist of the indie rock band Why?, of which his brother Yoni is the lead vocalist.

== History ==
Josiah Wolf has been a member of Why? since 2005.

His solo debut album, Jet Lag, was released on Anticon in 2010. He toured the United States in promotion of the album.

== Discography ==
=== Albums ===
- Jet Lag (2010)

=== EPs ===
- The Josiah EP (2003)

=== Why? ===
- Elephant Eyelash (2005)
- Alopecia (2008)
- Eskimo Snow (2009)
- Mumps, Etc. (2012)
- Moh Lhean (2017)

=== Contributions ===
- Clouddead – "JimmyBreeze" from Clouddead (2001)
- Clouddead – "Dead Dogs Two" from Ten (2004)
- Jel – "All Day Breakfast" from Soft Money (2006)
