= Anticon =

American independent record label

- Founded: 1998
- Founder: James Brandon Best; Adam Drucker; Tim Holland; Jeffrey Logan; David Madson; Baillie Parker; Brendon Whitney; Yoni Wolf
- Defunct: 2018
- Distributors: Redeye (World except UK); Melodic (UK)
- Genre: Indie hip-hop, electronic music, indie rock
- Country of origin: United States
- Location: Los Angeles, California
- Official website: www.anticon.com

Anticon (often styled as anticon.) was an independent record label/collective based in Los Angeles, California. It was founded in 1998 by seven musicians and manager Baillie Parker. It was collectively owned among six musicians, co-founder Parker, and manager Shaun Koplow. The original musicians signed to Anticon were once referred to as the Anticon collective. Following the death of one of its founding members in 2018, the label dissolved.

== History ==
The label's roster of artists has been described as "the hip-hop equivalent of post-rock" and "avant-garde hip-hop". Releases feature material created by its members, affiliates, and extended musical family. Although Anticon cohered originally within alternative hip-hop circles, Anticon's founders have become only tangentially related to hip-hop, and the label has begun releasing music in the indie rock and electronica genres. Artists signed to Anticon are based in the United States, Canada, and the United Kingdom.

The artists within the collective have been known to perform and release music in solo and group form. Artists on the label are known for frequent collaboration, both within and outside of their own collective. However, the Anticon collective has over time evolved into a group of separate artists who, despite sharing a similar progressive and often challenging indie quality, explore different styles of music including electronica and rock. Many of the artists on Anticon are signed to multiple labels, and some have their own small, independent labels through which they have self-released material.

Anticon has also organized art exhibitions featuring visual art by several of the artists on the label.

On February 9, 2010, co-founder Sole (Tim Holland) left Anticon exclaiming that it is time to try to push forward and find new opportunities. He leaves citing business and ideological differences while maintaining his love for the artists on Anticon. He said, "There are no ill feelings between myself and members of anticon. I will continue to work with many of the artists and will always love them as brothers and consider them allies." He officially renounced his 1/8 of ownership and formal affiliations.

On March 30, 2018, founding member Alias died of a heart attack at age 41. In November 2018, the label released a posthumous album from Alias that had been completed with label-mate Doseone prior to his death. The label had been quiet since then, and former co-founder Sole confirmed in July 2021 that the label had "dissolved" sometime after Alias's death.

== Owners ==
- Alias (Brendon Whitney)
- Doseone (Adam Drucker)
- Jel (Jeffrey Logan)
- Odd Nosdam (David Madson)
- Pedestrian (James Brandon Best)
- Yoni Wolf
- Baillie Parker

== Roster ==
- 13 & God
- A7pha
- Alias
- Alias & Ehren
- Alias & Tarsier
- Anathallo
- Angel Deradoorian
- Antonionian
- Antwon
- Baths
- Beans
- Bike for Three!
- Bomarr
- Bracken
- Buck 65
- Danielson
- Darc Mind
- Deep Puddle Dynamics
- DJ Mayonnaise
- D33j
- Doseone
- Dosh
- Tha Grimm Teachaz
- Jel
- Josiah Wolf
- Odd Nosdam
- Passage
- Pedestrian
- Pictureplane
- Raleigh Moncrief
- Restiform Bodies
- Sage Francis
- Saroos
- Serengeti
- Serengeti & Polyphonic
- Sisyphus
- Sixtoo
- SJ Esau
- Sole
- Sole and the Skyrider Band
- Son Lux
- Telephone Jim Jesus
- Thee More Shallows
- Themselves
- Tobacco
- Why?
- Young Fathers

=== License ===
- Genghis Tron
- Peeping Tom
- Zach Hill

=== Collaborators ===
Moodswing9, Slug, Ant, Eyedea, DJ Abilities, Mr. Dibbs, DJ Signify, DJ Krush, Controller 7, J. Rawls, Dax Pierson, Daddy Kev, The Notwist, Tunde Adebimpe of TV on the Radio, Mike Patton, Jessica Bailiff, Andrew Bird, Andrew Broder of Fog, Örvar Þóreyjarson Smárason of Múm, Dark Dark Dark, John Herndon of Tortoise, Wise Intelligent of Poor Righteous Teachers, Sufjan Stevens, Stefanie Böhm of Ms. John Soda, Anders Holm, Chris Adams of Hood, Circus of Shape Shifters, Scott Matelic, Matth, Megabusive, D-Styles, others.

== Projects ==
The Anticon collective is known for its many musical projects. Not all of these projects are released on the Anticon label. Artists within the Anticon collective have released collaborative albums on different labels or on their own independent labels.

Some notable projects of the Anticon collective include the following:

- cLOUDDEAD (Doseone, Why?, Odd Nosdam) on Mush Records and Big Dada
- Reaching Quiet (Why?, Odd Nosdam) on Mush Records
- So-Called Artists (Sole, Alias, DJ Mayonnaise) on Mush Records
- Hymie's Basement (Why?, Andrew Broder) on Lex Records
- Subtle (Doseone, Jel, Dax Pierson, Jordan Dalrymple, Alexander Kort, Marty Dowers) on Lex Records
- Greenthink (Doseone, Why?) on A Purple 100
- Presage (Jel, Mr. Dibbs) on Future Primitive Sound
- Object Beings (Doseone, Pedestrian & Why?)

== See also ==
- List of record labels
- Underground hip-hop
