= Sole discography =

- Studio albums: 27
- Extended plays: 14
- Compilation albums: 3
- Singles: 12
- Mixtapes: 2
- Remix albums: 3
- Audio books: 1
- DVDs: 1
- Guest appearances: 31

Sole is an American alternative hip hop artist based in Denver, Colorado. His discography consists of eighteen studio albums, four collaboration albums, ten EPs, two mixtapes, three remix albums, three compilations, twelve singles, one audiobook, one DVD, and many guest appearances on other artists' tracks.

== Discography ==
=== Studio albums ===
Year	Title	Notes
2000	Bottle of Humans: Released: 2000; Format: CD; Label: Anticon	Debut solo album.
2001	uck rt: Released: 2001; Format: CDr; Label: Self-released	CDr of demos sold on tour in 2001. Includes early versions of several tracks that would later appear on Selling Live Water.; The title is a play on the phrase "Fuck Art" and is alternately rendered "uck rt", "_uck _rt" or "uckrt" in various listing on the internet.
2003	Selling Live Water: Released: 2003; Format: CD, vinyl; Label: Anticon	
2003	Mansbestfriend Pt. 2: No Thanks: Released: 2003; Format: CD; Label: Self-released (2004 re-release on Morr Music)	Entirely self-produced.; Inititially self-released, the album was repackaged and remastered with additional tracks in 2004 and released by Morr Music under the title The New Human Is Illegal, with Sole using "Man'sbestfriend" (with an apostrophe) as an alternate moniker rather than as a title for the first time, as he would again (without an apostrophe) for his 2007 instrumental project Poly.Sci.187.
2005	Songs That Went Tin: Released: February 21, 2005; Format: CD; Label: Self-released	A collection of rare or previously unreleased tracks recorded for Bottle of Humans, Selling Live Water, Live from Rome and the Mansbestfriend series.
2005	Live from Rome: Released: February 22, 2005; Format: CD, vinyl; Label: Anticon	
2005	Mansbestfriend Pt. 3: My Own Worst Enemy: Released: June 6, 2005; Format: CD; Label: Self-released	Entirely self-produced.
2007	Poly.Sci.187: Released: 2007; Format: CD; Label: Anticon	Instrumental project.; Entirely self-produced.; Sole adopted the "Mansbestfriend" moniker for this album (as he had first done for the Volume 2 re-release), intending upon releasing instrumental work under that name. However, "Mansbestfriend" has since reverted to the title of a series of self-produced albums (as it began) with the release of fifth and sixth entries in the series in 2011. Poly.Sci.187 thereby retroactively became Mansbestfriend 4.
2007	Sole and the Skyrider Band (with Skyrider): Released: 2007; Format: CD, vinyl; Label: Anticon	Entirely produced by Skyrider.
2007	Desert Eagle Volume One: Released: 2007; Format: CDr, CD; Label: Self-released	Entirely self-produced.; Initially sold as a CDr on tour in 2007. Re-released on CD in 2008 without the "Volume One" subtitle.
2009	Plastique (with Skyrider): Released: 2009; Format: CD, vinyl, download; Label: Fake Four Inc.	Entirely produced by Skyrider.
2011	Hello Cruel World (with Skyrider): Released: 2011; Format: CD, vinyl, download; Label: Fake Four Inc.	Entirely produced by Skyrider.
2012	A Ruthless Criticism of Everything Existing: Released: November 13, 2012; Format: CD, download; Label: Black Canyon Records	
2013	No Wising Up No Settling Down: Released: May 1, 2013; Format: CD, download; Label: Black Canyon Records	
2013	No More Dystopias (with Yasamin Holland, as Whitenoise): Released: September 17, 2013; Format: Cassette, download; Label: Black Canyon Records	Instrumental project.; Whitenoise started out as a moniker for Sole's new instrumental music, but he collaborated closely with his wife Yasamin on this album, and in the process Whitenoise became their name as a duo.
2013	Crimes Against Totality: Released: November 5, 2013; Format: CD, download; Label: Black Canyon Records	
2014	Death Drive (with DJ Pain 1): Released: May 6, 2014; Format: CD, download; Label: Black Canyon Records	Entirely produced by DJ Pain 1.
2015	Ruins (with Yasamin Holland, as Whitenoise): Released: March 24, 2015; Format: Cassette, download; Label: Black Box Tapes	
2015	Mansbestfriend 7: Released: September 4, 2015; Format: CD, download; Label: Black Box Tapes	Entirely self-produced.
2016	Nihilismo (with DJ Pain 1): Released: April 22, 2016; Format: CD, vinyl, download; Label: Black Box Tapes	Entirely produced by DJ Pain 1.
2018	Let Them Eat Sand: Released: February 2, 2018; Format: CD, download; Label: Black Box Tapes	Entirely self-produced.
2019	Destituent: Released: February 22, 2019; Format: Vinyl, download; Label: Black Box Tapes	Entirely self-produced.
2019	No God nor Country (with DJ Pain 1): Released: November 18, 2019; Format: CD, vinyl, download; Label:	Entirely produced by DJ Pain 1.
2021	MBFX: Released: March 5, 2021; Format: Vinyl, download; Label: Black Box Tapes	Entirely self-produced.; The tenth entry in the Mansbestfriend series, retroactively positioning Let Them Eat Sand and Destituent as the eighth and ninth entries respectively.
2022	Post American Studies (with DJ Pain 1): Released: February 4, 2022; Format: TBA; Label: eMERGENCY heARTS	Entirely produced by DJ Pain 1.

=== Collaboration albums ===
Year	Title	Notes
1996	What's It All About (with Moodswing9, as Live Poets): Released: 1996; Format: , CD, cassette; Label: 45 Below	
1999	The Taste of Rain... Why Kneel? (with Alias, Doseone & Slug, as Deep Puddle Dynamics): Released: 1999; Format: CD; Label: Anticon	
2001	Paint by Number Songs (with Alias & DJ Mayonnaise, as So-Called Artists): Released: 2001; Format: CD; Label: Mush Records	

=== EPs ===
Year	Title	Notes
1994	Madd Skills & Unpaid Bills (with Moodswing9, as Northern Exposure): Released: 1994; Format: Cassette; Label: 45 Below	
1998	Music Without a Face: Released: 1998; Format: Cassette; Label: 45 Below	
2002	Mansbestfriend: Released: May 2002; Format: CDr, CD; Label: Self-released	
2002	We Ain't Fessin' (Double Quotes) (with Anticon & Deep Puddle Dynamics): Released: 1999; Format: CD; Label: Anticon	"More from June" is a song by Deep Puddle Dynamics, featuring Eyedea. "We Ain't Fessin' (Double Quotes)" and "Pitty Party People" are posse cuts by Anticon.
2007	Exhile: Released: May 21, 2007; Format: CD; Label: Anticon	
2009	Battlefields (with Skyrider): Released: October 13, 2009; Format: CD, vinyl, download; Label: Fake Four Inc.	Entirely produced by Skyrider.
2011	Mansbestfriend Vol. 5: Released: February 14, 2011; Format: CD, download; Label: Black Canyon Records	
2011	Mansbestfriend V. 6: Radioactive Rain: Released: May 26, 2011; Format: CD, download; Label: Black Canyon Music	
2011	The Challenger EP (with Skyrider): Released: December 13, 2011; Format: CD, download; Label: Fake Four Inc.	Entirely produced by Skyrider.
2012	Yung Planetz EP (with Bleubird & K-the-I???, as Waco Boyz): Released: June 19, 2012; Format: Download; Label: Fake Four Inc.	
2012	Songs That Went Void: Released: August 3, 2012; Format: Download; Label:	EP of previously unreleased tracks, made available exclusively to backers of Sole's Kickstarter campaign for A Ruthless Criticism of Everything Existing (2012). The majority of these songs later appeared on Crimes Against Totality (2013).
2014	Warfare (with DJ Pain 1): Released: April 11, 2014; Format: Download; Label: Black Canyon Music	
2014	Pattern of Life (with DJ Pain 1): Released: August 26, 2014; Format: Download; Label: Black Canyon Music	
2019	Destituted: Released: March 20, 2019; Format: Download; Label:	Patreon-exclusive companion EP to the album Destituent.
2020	Worlds Not Yet Gone: Released: February 4, 2020; Format: Download; Label:	Patreon-exclusive EP of science fiction-themed songs.

=== Mixtapes ===
Year	Title	Notes
2001	Red Dawn: A Baybridge Epic (with Pedestrian, as Da Babylonianz): Released: 2001; Format: CD-R; Label:	Gangsta rap parody album. Sole and Pedestrian adopted the names Blazefest and Whitefolks (respectively) for this album.
2009	Nuclear Winter Volume 1: Released: October 30, 2009; Format: Download; Label:	Topical political songs recorded over commercial hip hop beats.
2011	Nuclear Winter Volume 2: Death Panel: Released: June 21, 2011; Format: Download; Label: Black Canyon Music	Topical political songs recorded over commercial hip hop beats.

=== Remix albums ===
Year	Title	Notes
2008	The Secret History of Underground Rap: Released: 2008; Format: CD, download; Label:	Remixes of classic hip hop songs from the 1990s.
2009	Sole and the Skyrider Band Remix LP: Released: February 3, 2009; Format: CD, download; Label:	Remixes of songs from the album Sole and the Skyrider Band by a variety of artists.
2010	Spring Offensive Volume 1: Nuclear Winter Remixes: Released: August 10, 2010; Format: Download; Label: Black Canyon Music	Remixes of songs from the mixtape Nuclear Winter Volume One by a variety of artists.
2015	Death Drive: First as Tragedy, Then as Remix: Released: January 6, 2015; Format: Download; Label: Black Canyon Music	An EP of remixes of songs from the album Death Drive by a variety of artists.

=== Compilation albums ===
Year	Title	Notes
2002	Learning to Walk: Released: April 9, 2002; Format: CD; Label: 6 Months	A selection of Sole's early material, compiled from the years 1994-1998.
2011	Dispatches from the American Fall: Released: 2011; Format: Download; Label: Black Canyon Music	A selection of Sole's political songs, compiled from the years 2003-2011.

=== Live albums ===
Year	Title	Notes
2008	Live at The Middle East (with Skyrider): Released: November 18, 2008; Format: Download; Label:	
2010	Live in Europe (with Skyrider): Released: 2010; Format: CD-R; Label:	

=== Singles ===
Year	Title	Notes
1995	"Sole" (with Live Poets): Released: 1995; Format: 7" vinyl; Label: 45 Below	
1997	"Respect" (with Live Poets): Released: 1997; Format: 7" vinyl; Label: 45 Below	
1998	"Respect": Released: 1998; Format: 7" vinyl; Label: 45 Below	
1999	"Rainmen" (with Deep Puddle Dynamics): Released: 1999; Format: 10" vinyl; Label: Anticon	
1999	"Bottle of Humans": Released: 1999; Format: 10" vinyl; Label: Anticon	
2001	"Sideshow" (with So-Called Artists): Released: 2001; Format: 10" vinyl; Label: Mush Records	
2002	"Salt on Everything": Released: 2002; Format: 10" vinyl; Label: Anticon	
2003	"Plutonium": Released: 2003; Format: 10" vinyl; Label: Anticon	
2005	"New Single": Released: 2005; Format: 10" vinyl; Label: Anticon	
2011	"Hello Cruel World" (with Skyrider): Released: 2011; Format: Digital download; Label: Fake Four Inc.	
2012	"Young Sole": Released: 2012; Format: Digital download; Label: Black Canyon Records	
2012	"The Untouchables": Released: 2012; Format: Digital download; Label: Black Canyon Records	

=== Audio books ===
Year	Title	Notes
2010	The Pyre: Released: 2010; Format: CD; Label: Self-released	

=== DVDs ===
Year	Title	Notes
2012	Art Is War: Released: 2012; Format: DVD; Label: Self-released	

== Guest appearances ==
- Sixtoo - "Cave People" from The Psyche Intangible (1998)
- Themselves - "Lyrical Cougel" from Them (1999)
- Sixtoo - "When Freedom Rings" from Songs I Hate (and Other People Moments) (2001)
- Sage Francis - "I Apologize" from Sick of Waiting Tables (2001)
- Clouddead - "I Promise Never to Get Paint on My Glasses Again (1)" from Clouddead (2001)
- DJ Krush - "Song for John Walker" from The Message at the Depth (2002)
- Bleubird - "Another Super Mario Cart Brothers Drive By" from Sloppy Doctor (2003)
- Pedestrian - "Arrest the President" from Volume One: UnIndian Songs (2005)
- Sage Francis - "My Head" from Still Sickly Business (2005)
- Mr. Nogatco - "Live Dissection" from Nogatco Rd. (2006)
- Scott Da Ros - "Humans Bury Deep" from One Kind of Dead End (2006)
- Noah23 - "Tragic Comedy" from Rock Paper Scissors (2008)
- Skyrider - "Infest" from Skyrider (2008)
- Themselves - "1 for No Money" from The Free Houdini (2009)
- Time - "Trouble with Kids" from Naked Dinner (2010)
- Ceschi - "Long Live the Short Lived" from The One Man Band Broke Up (2010)
- Factor Chandelier - "Living in a Vacuum" from Lawson Graham (2010)
- Factor - "Don't Jock the Dead" from 13 Stories (2010)
- Kay the Aquanaut - "Kill You" from Waterloo (2011)
- Noah23 - "Murder City" from Fry Cook on Venus (2011)
- The Bins - "Inspiration" from Inspiration (2011)
- Kaigen - "Don't Try to Stop It" & "Rust Belt Fellows" from Re: Bloomer (2011)
- K-the-I??? - "The Third Planet" from Synthesthesia (2011)
- Noah23 & Krem - "Darkside of the Moon" from The Terminal Illness EP (2011)
- Sixo - "Government Bonds" from Free Floating Rationales (2012)
- Sixo - "Dance with Stars" from Tracking Perception EP (2012)
- Bong-Ra - "Monolith", "Inspiration", "Trillion Nemesi" & "Pandora's Box" from Monolith (2012)

Tracks appear on

- "Rainmen", "Savior?", "Human Races the Tortoise", "Martyr Theme Song" & "Holy Shit!" on Music for the Advancement of Hip Hop (1999)
- "Props 2000" on Strictly Indee (2000)
- "We Ain't Fessin'", "Silence (Poor Me Pt. 7)" & "A.D.D." on Giga Single (2001)
- "Shoot the Messenger", "Bottle of Humans", "Salt on Everything" & "Dumb This Down" on Anticon Label Sampler: 1999-2004 (2004)
- "The Great Deluge" & "Fukushima Tokyo Electric Russian Roulette" on J-A-P-A-N: A Fake Four Inc. Japan Relief Benefit EP (2011)
