= Exile (disambiguation) =

Exile is either an entity who is, or the state of being, away from one's home while being explicitly refused permission to return.

Exile, exiled, exiles, The Exile, or The Exiles may also refer to:

== Exiles ==
- Babylonian captivity, or Babylonian exile of the 6th century B.C., in which people were deported from the Kingdom of Judah to Babylon
- Cuban exile, the exodus of Cubans since the 1959 Cuban Revolution
- Francoism, or the exile of Republicans in Spain, during the regime of Francisco Franco
- Malta exiles, prominent citizens of the Ottoman Empire who were sent to exile in Malta
- Marian exiles, English Protestants who mostly fled to Germany, Switzerland, and France to join reformed churches
- Tax exile, one who chooses to leave their native country and live where taxes are lower or nil
- Sürgünlik (Crimean Tatar: 'exile'), the forced population transfer and genocide of Crimean Tatars by Soviet authorities in 1944

== People with the name ==
- Exile (producer), American hip hop producer
- Tim Exile, British electronic musician

== Fictional entities ==
- Exile (Last Exile), spaceship in the anime series Last Exile
- Exiles (Marvel Comics), a superhero team
- Exiles (Middle-earth), in J. R. R. Tolkien's Middle-earth legendarium
- Exile (Road Rovers), an anthropomorphic dog from the cartoon Road Rovers
- Jedi Exile, a character in the PC/Xbox videogame Star Wars: Knights of the Old Republic II: The Sith Lords

== Literature ==
=== Books and book series ===
- Exile (Deeping novel) (1930), by Warwick Deeping
- Exile (Forgotten Realms novel) (1990), a novel in The Dark Elf Trilogy by R. A. Salvatore
- Exile (Patterson novel) (2007), by Richard North Patterson
- Exile (Star Wars novel) (2007), by Aaron Allston, the fourth book in the Legacy of the Force series
- Exile, the English title of Deoraíocht (1910), by Pádraic Ó Conaire
- Exiles, a 2022 murder mystery novel by Jane Harper
- Exiles trilogy, a fantasy novel series by Melanie Rawn
- The Exile (Buck book), a biography by Pearl S. Buck about her father, Absalom Sydenstricker
- The Exile: Sex, Drugs, and Libel in the New Russia, a 2000 memoir by Matt Taibbi and Mark Ames
- The Exile, a 2004 novel by Allan Folsom
- The Exile, a 1987 novel by William Kotzwinkle in which a famous actor becomes a Nazi during World War II
- The Exile: The Flight of Osama bin Laden, a 2017 book by Adrian Levy and Cathy Scott-Clark
- Exiles (novel), 2022, by Jane Harper
- The Exiles, a novel and series by Hilary McKay

=== Short stories ===
- "The Exiles" (Bradbury story), a 1949 science fiction short story by Ray Bradbury
- "The Exiles", a story by Horacio Quiroga
- "Exile", a 1943 short story by Edmond Hamilton

=== Periodicals ===
- The Exile, a short-lived literary magazine published by Ezra Pound
- The eXile, a biweekly English language newspaper published in Moscow
- The Exile, a WWII fortnightly camp magazine in Changi Prison with contributions by Ronald Searle and George Sprod

=== Plays and audiodrama ===
- Exile (audio drama), in Doctor Who
- Exiles (play), 1918, by James Joyce
- The Exiles, a cycle of four plays written for television by Lynn Foster

=== Comics ===
- Exile, the fourteenth book of the series Guardians of Ga'Hoole by Kathryn Lasky
- Exiles (Malibu Comics), one of two series published in 1993 and 1995 by Malibu Comics
- Exiles (Marvel Comics), a superhero team
  - Exiles (comic book), a series published by Marvel Comics starting in 2001

== Film and TV ==
=== Films ===
- Exile (1917 film), an American silent drama
- Exile (1994 film), an Australian film
- Exile (2013 film), by Charles-Olivier Michaud
- Exile (2016 film), by Rithy Panh
- Exile (2020 film), a Kosovan film
- Exiled (2006 film), by Johnnie To
- Exiled (2019 film), a Nicaraguan documentary
- Exiled: A Law & Order Movie (1998), a television movie based on the television series Law & Order
- Exils (2004), by Tony Gatlif
- The Exile (1914 film), a Hungarian film
- The Exile (1922 film), a Soviet Georgian film
- The Exile (1931 film), directed by Oscar Micheaux
- The Exile (1947 film), directed by Max Ophüls
- The Exiles (1923 film), directed by Edmund Mortimer
- The Exiles (1961 film), a documentary by Kent MacKenzie
- The Exiles (2022 film), a documentary by Lola Amaria
- The Exiles (2024 film), a drama directed by Belén Funes

=== Television ===
==== Episodes ====
- "Exile" (Casualty), a 2015 episode of the BBC series Casualty
- "Exile" (Smallville), a 2003 episode of the WB series Smallville
- "Exile" (Star Trek: Enterprise), a 2003 episode of Star Trek: Enterprise
- "Exile", a second-to-last episode of The Dead Zone
- "Exile", a 2018 episode of Law and Order: SVU
- "The Exiles" (Space: 1999), a 1976 episode of Space: 1999

==== Series ====
- Exile (TV series), a 2011 psychological thriller series from BBC
- Exiled (TV series), a spinoff series of the MTV reality show My Super Sweet 16
- The Exile (TV series), an American television series
- All Hail King Julien: Exiled, subtitle of the 2017 season of the animated television series All Hail King Julien

==== Other uses in television ====
- The Exiles, a cycle of four plays written for television by Lynn Foster
- Ex-ile, a set of games on the 2014 reality TV show The Challenge: Battle of the Exes II

== Games ==
- Exile (1988 video game), a space-based computer game
- Exile (1988 video game series) (1988, 1991, 1993), an action role-playing game trilogy about an assassin during the Crusades
- Exile (1995 video game series) (1995, 1996, 1997), a series of shareware computer role-playing games for Microsoft Windows and Mac OS
- Myst III: Exile (2001), the third installment of the Myst computer game series

== Music ==
=== Groups ===
- Exile (American band), an American country band
  - Exile (1983 Exile album), a 1983 album by this band
- Exile (Japanese band), a Japanese pop music group

=== Albums ===
- Exile (Aloud album), 2010
- Exile (Anorexia Nervosa album), 1997
- Exile (Gary Numan album), 1997
- Exile (Geoffrey Oryema album), 1990
- Exile (Hurts album), 2013
- Exile (Steve Reynolds album), 2006
- Exile, 2012, by To-Mera
- Exhile, 2007, by Sole
- Exiles (Dan Fogelberg album), 1987
- Exiles (Max Richter album), 2021
- Exile (Demon Hunter album), 2022
- The Exile (album), Crowder album, 2024

=== Songs ===
- "Exile" (song), 2020, by Taylor Swift, featuring Bon Iver
- "Exile", by Enya from Watermark, 1988
- "Exile", by Geoffrey Oryema from Exile, 1990
- "Exile", by Gary Numan from Exile, 1997
- "Exile", by Slayer from God Hates Us All, 2001
- "Exile", by Soilwork from Sworn to a Great Divide, 2007
- "Exile", by Hurts from Exile, 2013
- "Exile", a Russian art song composed by Georgy Sviridov
- "Exiles", by King Crimson from Larks' Tongues in Aspic, 1973
- "Exiles", by Dan Fogelberg from Exiles, 1987
- "The Exile", by Madder Mortem from Deadlands, 2002

== Brands and enterprises ==
- Exile Studios (see: Hollow Earth Expedition), a role-playing game company
- Exiles Bookshop, a Sydney bookshop which hosted many poetry readings

== Sports ==
- Exiles rugby league team, an international rugby league team
- Exiles, a name used for an Other Nationalities rugby league team, comprising European based Australian, New Zealand, and Pacific Island players
- The Exiles, a frequently used nickname for London Irish RFC, an English rugby union club
- The Exiles, a nickname of Newport County A.F.C., a Welsh football club

== Other uses ==
- Exile, Wisconsin
- Exile (moth) (Apamea zeta ssp. marmorata)
- Project Exile, a controversial federal program started in Richmond, Virginia in 1997
- Exile Hill, a hill in British Columbia, Canada

== See also ==
- X Isle (2009 novel) a young adult novel by Steve Augarde
- In Exile (disambiguation)
- Government-in-exile
