= The Forcefield Kids =

Studio album by Passage
- Released: May 25, 2004
- Genre: Alternative hip hop
- Length: 48:49
- Label: Anticon
- Producer: Passage

Passage chronology
Moods & Symptoms (2000)	The Forcefield Kids (2004)

Singles from The Forcefield Kids
- 1. "Creature in the Classroom" Released: May 10, 2004

Professional ratings
Review scores
Source	Rating
CMJ New Music Monthly	favorable
Dusted Magazine	favorable
Exclaim!	favorable
Pitchfork	6.6/10
SF Weekly	favorable
Splendid Magazine	favorable
Tiny Mix Tapes	3.5/5 stars

The Forcefield Kids is the debut solo studio album by American hip hop musician Passage. It was released on Anticon in 2004. "Creature in the Classroom" was released as a single from the album. The album peaked at number 80 on the CMJ Top 200 chart, as well as number 7 on the CMJ Hip Hop chart.

== Critical reception ==
Liam Singer of Pitchfork gave the album a 6.6 out of 10, saying: "The stark contrasts of images and styles combined with the musical assault give the impression of Passage as an ADD-addled teen in a room full of keyboards and samplers, letting loose the ravings of his sugar-soaked subconscious." Christopher R. Weingarten of CMJ New Music Monthly said, "Passage emotes about education, race and loneliness in those Anticon-oclastic beat poetics that ride the fence between astute imagery and non-sequitur." Melissa Wheeler of Exclaim! said, "there's a lot going on, which can make the album seem disorganised and uninspired, but after a few listens it becomes clear that Passage does alright in his organised mess."

== Track listing ==
All tracks are written by Passage, except "Suffragette" and "Pail of Air" by Passage and Telephone Jim Jesus.

No.	Title	Length
1.	"Forcefield Intro"	2:07
2.	"In the Bioburbs"	2:32
3.	"Creature in the Classroom"	2:57
4.	"The Pins in the Bowels of the Charmed Design"	1:00
5.	"Old Aunt Mary"	2:43
6.	"Free Luv from Left Field"	2:30
7.	"Whine Money"	0:56
8.	"The Unstrung Harp"	1:55
9.	"The Kareoki Kiss Ass"	1:12
10.	"Put Together, Play, Red Ferrari Calendar"	4:42
11.	"Jail 4 Lil Geniuses"	1:36
12.	"Duck'n'Cover"	2:31
13.	"19911"	1:07
14.	"The Unspectacular White Boy Slave Song"	2:12
15.	"Spring '97"	2:41
16.	"Suffragette"	4:40
17.	"Reagan's Chest"	1:34
18.	"All the News That's Fit to Print"	2:58
19.	"Scarefilm"	2:10
20.	"Poem to the Hospital"	2:12
21.	"Pail of Air"	2:38

== Personnel ==
Credits adapted from liner notes.

- Passage – vocals, production, cover design, collage
- Sole – field noise assistance (1)
- Telephone Jim Jesus – vibraphone (5), guitar (16, 21)
- Odd Nosdam – additional keyboards (8), additional computer chops, song edits, advice, cover design, layout
- Kristen Ericksen – additional computer chops, song edits, advice
- Jeremy Goody – mixing, mastering
- Bomarr – cover design
