= Restiform bodies =

Restiform body or bodies can mean:

- Restiform body, the inferior cerebellar peduncle in the human brain
- Restiform Bodies (band), an alternative hip hop trio based in San Francisco, California
  - Restiform Bodies (album), the second album and label debut by this band
