= No Wising Up No Settling Down =

Studio album by Sole
- Released: May 1, 2013
- Genre: Hip-hop
- Length: 49:46
- Label: Black Canyon
- Producer: Man Mantis; DJ Pain 1; Skyrider; Cars & Trains; Loden; Snubluck; The Hood Internet; Shapers; Gold Panda; Spencertron; Dosh; Sole; William Ryan Fritch

Sole chronology
A Ruthless Criticism of Everything Existing (2012)	No Wising Up No Settling Down (2013)	Crimes Against Totality (2013)

Professional ratings
Review scores
Source	Rating
PopMatters	2/10 stars

No Wising Up No Settling Down is a solo studio album by American hip-hop artist Sole. It was released on May 1, 2013. It includes contributions from Gold Panda, The Hood Internet, Dosh, Ceschi, Man Mantis, Skyrider, Cars & Trains, and Loden. Music videos were created for "I Think I'm Emma Goldman" and "Extremophile".

== Production ==
Meant to be a sequel to A Ruthless Criticism of Everything Existing, No Wising Up No Settling Down is the second installment in the Ruthless Criticism of Everything Existing series. It "focuses more on the personal and social/philosophical aspects of the class struggle", abandoning the "overtly political song writing for a more subtle, honest, experimental and poetic approach."

== Track listing ==
No.	Title	Producer(s)	Length
1.	"Introfukyall" (featuring Decomposure)	Man Mantis	3:39
2.	"The Trap" (featuring Mestizo)	DJ Pain 1	4:07
3.	"Civil War" (featuring Ceschi and Sean Bonnette)	Skyrider	5:15
4.	"Insurgent Rap"	DJ Pain 1	3:14
5.	"My Veganism" (featuring Cars & Trains)	Cars & Trains	3:28
6.	"People Piss Me Off"	Loden	3:59
7.	"I Think I'm Emma Goldman"	DJ Pain 1	3:38
8.	"Geneology of Giving a Fuck"	Snubluck	3:00
9.	"Gangster of Love"	The Hood Internet; Shapers	3:00
10.	"Extremophile" (featuring Robin Walker)	Gold Panda	2:39
11.	"303 Ways to Die" (featuring Manerok and Time)	Man Mantis	3:19
12.	"Prole"	Spencertron	4:02
13.	"No Wising Up No Settling Down"	Dosh	3:12
14.	"War on Self" (featuring William Ryan Fritch)	Sole; William Ryan Fritch	3:14
Total length:			49:46
