= A Ruthless Criticism of Everything Existing =

Studio album by Sole
- Released: November 13, 2012
- Genre: Hip-hop
- Length: 45:13
- Label: Black Canyon
- Producers: Man Mantis; Factor Chandelier; Leif Kolt; Skyrider; Ecid; Real Magic; Ryan Hemsworth; Spencer; Busdriver; Alias; Ausker

Sole chronology
Live from Rome (2005)	A Ruthless Criticism of Everything Existing (2012)	No Wising Up No Settling Down (2013)

A Ruthless Criticism of Everything Existing is a solo studio album by American hip-hop artist Sole. It was released on November 13, 2012. The title derives from a letter written by Karl Marx. A music video was created for "Assad Is Dead".

== Critical reception ==
Professional ratings
Review scores
Source	Rating
Alarm	favorable
AllMusic	3.5/5 stars

David Jeffries of AllMusic gave the album 3.5 stars out of 5, saying, "Sole's 2012 effort is more connectable than his early work and worth a listen if alternative observations hold more attraction than easy answers." Chris Martins of Spin called it "his most accessible work since 2003's Selling Live Water." Scott Morrow of Alarm said: "Songs for the revolution have seldom been so danceable, fun, and — dare we say it — pretty."

Alarm included it on the "50 Favorite Albums of 2012" list, while Westword listed it as one of the best local albums of 2012.

== Track listing ==
No.	Title	Producer(s)	Length
1.	"Non Workers of the World" (featuring William Ryan Fritch)	Man Mantis	2:40
2.	"Young Sole"	Factor Chandelier	3:31
3.	"Denver Nights"	Leif Kolt	4:08
4.	"Assad Is Dead" (written by Pedestrian)	Skyrider	3:15
5.	"Never Work"	Ecid	3:22
6.	"Last Earth" (featuring William Ryan Fritch)	Man Mantis	2:44
7.	"The Untouchables" (featuring Green Carpeted Stairs)	Man Mantis	5:20
8.	"The Void Which Binds" (featuring Real Magic)	Real Magic	4:28
9.	"Letter to a Young Rapper"	Ryan Hemsworth	3:03
10.	"Animal"	Spencer	3:30
11.	"The Inferno"	Busdriver	3:19
12.	"Definition of Slave" (featuring Open Mike Eagle)	Alias	3:36
13.	"Ruthless"	Ausker	2:12
Total length:			45:13
