= Passage (rapper) =

- Birth name: David Bryant
- Born: Boston, Massachusetts
- Origin: Oakland, California
- Genres: Alternative hip hop
- Occupation(s): Rapper, Producer
- Years active: 2000–present
- Labels: Anticon
- Website: www.anticon.com

David Bryant, better known by his stage name Passage, is an alternative hip hop rapper based in Oakland, California. He is a member of Restiform Bodies along with Bomarr and Telephone Jim Jesus.

== History ==
Passage released his official debut album, The Forcefield Kids, on Anticon in 2004.

He is also a member of Brothers Backword along with Mike Busse. The duo released the Stupid Intelligent mixtape in 2009.

== Discography ==
=== Studio albums ===
Passage

- Moods & Symptoms (2000) (with Bomarr)
- The Forcefield Kids (Anticon, 2004)
- Worked On (Illuminated Paths, 2017)

Restiform Bodies (Passage with Bomarr & Telephone Jim Jesus)

- Oubliette (2000)
- Restiform Bodies (6months, 2001)
- Sun Hop Flat (2001)
- TV Loves You Back (Anticon, 2008)

Brothers Backword (Passage with Mike Busse)

- Malfunction (2010) [unreleased]

=== EPs, mixtapes, compilations, singles ===
EPs

- Tennis, Piano and Other Primary Sightings [aka The Holy Phony Haunt] (2004)
- Pass Money Multi (2008)
- Pass and Touch (Marathon of Dope, 2011)

Mixtapes

- Stupid Intelligent (2009) (Brothers Backword)

Remix albums

- TV Loves You Back: Remixes (2013) (Restiform Bodies)

Compilations

- The B-Side Suicide Pageant (2002)
- Newbliette (Subversiv Rec, 2004) (Restiform Bodies)

Singles

- "I Want What You Want / Recycle America" (Weapon-Shaped, 2003) (Restiform Bodies)
- "Creature in the Classroom" (Anticon, 2004)

=== Appearances ===
Guest appearances

- Bomarr - "Plywood Never Got Paid" from Beats Being Broke (2002)
- Deep Puddle Dynamics - "We Ain't Fessin' (Double Quotes)" from We Ain't Fessin' (Double Quotes) (2002)
- DJ Krush - "Song for John Walker" from The Message at the Depth (2002)
- Telephone Jim Jesus - "Convertible Stingray" from A Point Too Far to Astronaut (2004)
- Pedestrian - "Anticon." from Volume One: UnIndian Songs (2005)
- Sole - "Isn't It Sad" from Songs That Went Tin (2005)
- Themselves - "Puzzled" from The Free Houdini (2009)

Featured tracks

- "The Unstrung Harp" & "Poem to the Hospital" on Anticon Label Sampler: 1999-2004 (2004)
