= Poly.Sci.187 =

Studio album by Mansbestfriend
- Released: May 29, 2007
- Recorded: January – September 2006
- Genre: Instrumental hip-hop
- Length: 40:27
- Label: Anticon
- Producer: Sole

Mansbestfriend chronology
Mansbestfriend Pt. 3: My Own Worst Enemy (2005)	Poly.Sci.187 (2007)	Mansbestfriend Vol. 5 (2011)

Poly.Sci.187, later retitled Mansbestfriend 4: Poly.Sci.187, is an instrumental studio album by American hip-hop artist Sole. It was released on Anticon on May 29, 2007.

Sole adopted the "Mansbestfriend" moniker for this album (as he had first done for The New Human Is Illegal, a revised version of Mansbestfriend Pt. 2: No Thanks). He intended to release instrumental work under that name. However, "Mansbestfriend" has since reverted to the title of a series of self-produced albums (as it began) with the release of fifth and sixth entries in the series in 2011. Poly.Sci.187 thereby retroactively became Mansbestfriend 4.

== Critical reception ==
Professional ratings
Review scores
Source	Rating
AllMusic	2.5/5 stars
Pitchfork	7.0/10
PopMatters	2/10 stars
XLR8R	unfavorable

Marisa Brown of AllMusic gave the album 2.5 stars out of 5, calling it "a dismal, electronic-leaning set that moves around sloshily without much heed for reason or direction." She added, "The record's production is messy and distracted, never quite deciding what it actually wants to do, trying too much and too little at the same time, and since this is, for all practical consideration, an instrumental (Sole lays down and samples his own vocal tracks a few times, but the words are always low in the mix), this lack of attention to actual purpose detracts from it greatly." Eric Harvey of Pitchfork gave the album a 7.0 out of 10, stating that it "proves that he can remove his signature musical element and still create a record that pushes many of the same affective buttons while moving out in unconventional directions." Gentry Boeckel of PopMatters gave the album 2 stars out of 10, writing, "Poly.Sci.187 is easily the weakest recording in his catalogue, a tossed-off artistic diversion that hardly anyone besides his closest friends and labelmates will hear, or care about." David Ma of XLR8R said, "Sole is surely a creative artist, but Poly.Sci.187 is an unremarkable footnote in his otherwise strong discography."

== Track listing ==
No.	Title	Length
1.	"Dedemma Speaks"	1:11
2.	"The Teachings of Leviticus"	2:13
3.	"Wilting Onward"	3:22
4.	"High Noon and Sobered"	3:21
5.	"Allieverwanted"	2:55
6.	"Stuck in My Head Since I Was 12"	2:53
7.	"Giant Man Eating Bird"	1:42
8.	"Bosnian Jazz"	1:24
9.	"Spin the Humans"	2:35
10.	"50 at 30"	0:52
11.	"Firefish"	1:34
12.	"Father vs. Courage"	2:40
13.	"Party Till We Drop"	2:26
14.	"Missile Defense"	4:09
15.	"How Big Is Space"	3:18
16.	"6 Million Wayz 2 Live"	3:44
Total length:		40:27

== Personnel ==
Credits adapted from liner notes.

- Sole – music, recording
- William Ryan Fritch – extra instrumentation, guitar (5, 12, 15), melodica (8), keyboards (11)
- Kip Killagain – drums (2)
- Yasamin – bassline (11), keyboards (13)
