= Anticon Label Sampler: 1999–2004 =

Compilation album by various artists
- Released: March 22, 2004
- Genre: Hip hop
- Length: 79:11
- Label: Anticon
- Producer: Why?, Themselves, Alias, Passage, Jel, Controller 7, Odd Nosdam, Matth, Sixtoo, Hrvatski, Restiform Bodies, Josiah, Dosh

Anticon chronology
Giga Single (2001)	Anticon Label Sampler: 1999–2004 (2004)

Professional ratings
Review scores
Source	Rating
AllMusic	3.5/5 stars
Dusted Magazine	favorable
Uncut	4/5
XLR8R	favorable

Anticon Label Sampler: 1999–2004 is a compilation album released by American hip hop record label Anticon in 2004. It peaked at number 25 on CMJ's Hip Hop chart.

== Critical reception ==
Marisa Brown of AllMusic gave the album 3.5 stars out of 5, saying: "Even though most of the songs are under three minutes, there isn't much superfluous filler to weigh down the record." Susanna Bolle of XLR8R said: "For those not already familiar with Anticon, this budget-priced compilation provides an excellent primer, collecting tracks by the label's extended stable of artists, from the fantastic, absurdist rhymes of Themselves to the acerbic rants of Sole."

== Track listing ==
No.	Title	Artist(s)	Length
1.	"Hello"		0:19
2.	"Cold Lunch" (Albert Brown Mortuary Dumpster Dive Remix)	Why?	1:15
3.	"Dark Sky Demo"	Themselves	2:35
4.	"Watching Water"	Alias	2:25
5.	"Shoot the Messenger"	Sole	2:15
6.	"The Unstrung Harp"	Passage	1:50
7.	"The Toss & Turn"	Pedestrian	3:24
8.	"Mothers of Invention"	Deep Puddle Dynamics	2:35
9.	"Bunny Slippers"	Controller 7	0:51
10.	"Wig 21"	Odd Nosdam	2:20
11.	"Poison Pit"	Themselves	2:07
12.	"Hahaha / On My 19th"	Why?	2:52
13.	"Bottle of Humans"	Sole	2:44
14.	"Divine Disappointment"	Alias	3:38
15.	"It's Them"	Themselves	3:22
16.	"Pity Party People Interlude"		0:19
17.	"Eat: Chew"	Odd Nosdam	1:30
18.	"Poem to the Hospital"	Passage	2:10
19.	"Jane 2: Electric Boogaloo"	Pedestrian	2:24
20.	"Pill Hiding"	Alias	2:14
21.	"Salt on Everything"	Sole	2:18
22.	"Bad Entropy"	Why?	1:21
23.	"Wig 12"	Odd Nosdam	2:00
24.	"Crack Pipes"	Sage Francis	1:56
25.	"Sixes Last"	Alias	1:38
26.	"Dec. 26th, 2002"	Alias	2:43
27.	"Good People Check" (Hrvatski Remix)	Themselves	3:18
28.	"Sippy Cup"	Restiform Bodies	2:30
29.	"Darla"	Why?	2:55
30.	"Steve the Cat"	Dosh	4:13
31.	"Unseen Sights" (featuring Markus Acher)	Alias	4:26
32.	"Dumb This Down"	Sole	3:13
33.	"Nice Last" (Demo Version)	Jel	3:51
