= Anywhere Out of the Everything =

Studio album by Telephone Jim Jesus
- Released: September 25, 2007
- Genre: Instrumental hip hop
- Length: 48:26
- Label: Anticon
- Producer: Telephone Jim Jesus

Telephone Jim Jesus chronology
| A Point Too Far to Astronaut (2004) | Anywhere Out of the Everything (2007) |

Anywhere Out of the Everything is the second studio album by American hip hop producer Telephone Jim Jesus. It was released on Anticon in 2007. It includes contributions from Pedestrian, Why?, Bomarr, Alias, Odd Nosdam, and Doseone, among others. The title of the album derives from Charles Baudelaire's poem "Anywhere Out of the World".

== Critical reception ==
Professional ratings
Review scores
| Source | Rating |
|---|---|
| Alarm | mixed |
| Performer | favorable |
| SLUG Magazine | favorable |
| XLR8R | 4/10 |

Casey P. O'Neill of Performer gave the album a favorable review, saying: "With an intricately melodic sound that borders on both the beautifully ambient and the darkest aggressions, the primarily instrumental album takes the listener to new places with its melancholy songs and tapestries of sonic nuances." He added, "Telephone Jim Jesus has created a sonic masterpiece, letting the music be the ultimate guide into the unknown." Bryant Rutledge of XLR8R described it as "an instrumental album of warm atmospherics and effected acoustic guitars, where dark and light constantly play off one another."

On July 9, 2007, the album was included on XLR8R's "Office Top Ten Album Picks" list.

== Track listing ==
| No. | Title | Length |
|---|---|---|
| 1. | "Did You Hear?" | 4:24 |
| 2. | "Birdstatic" | 4:05 |
| 3. | "Ugly Knees" | 2:26 |
| 4. | "Featherfall" | 2:12 |
| 5. | "Leather & Glue" | 4:32 |
| 6. | "A Mouth of Fingers" | 6:26 |
| 7. | "Suicide Wings (Birdstatic Remix)" | 5:43 |
| 8. | "Dice Raw" | 4:21 |
| 9. | "Hit by Numbers" | 8:10 |
| 10. | "Faces All Melted" | 3:00 |
| 11. | "The Castle by the Freeway" | 3:15 |
| Total length: | | 48:26 |

== Personnel ==
Credits adapted from liner notes.

- Telephone Jim Jesus – music, mixing, artwork
- Alias – guest appearance (2, 7)
- Doseone – guest appearance (3)
- Pedestrian – guest appearance (3, 4, 6, 8)
- Alex Kort – guest appearance (4)
- Vika – guest appearance (5)
- Bomarr – guest appearance (6, 9, 10)
- Why? – guest appearance (8)
- Kendra – guest appearance (11)
- Colin Guthrie – engineering (3, 6, 8, 10)
- Matt Koshak – engineering (10)
- Odd Nosdam – filtering (10, 11)
- Christopher Davidson – mastering
- Sam Flax Keener – layout
