= Matt Chang =

- Also known as: Bay Blue, Matth, Math
- Born: Pacifica, California
- Origin: Oakland, California
- Genres: Instrumental hip hop
- Occupation: Producer
- Instrument: Sampler
- Years active: 1999–present
- Label: Anticon
- Website: www.anticon.com

Matt Chang, also known by his stage name Bay Blue, is an underground hip hop producer based in Oakland, California. He has collaborated with Sole, Pedestrian and Sixtoo under the alias Matth.

== History ==
From 2005, Matt Chang spent seven years making four albums' worth of tracks for his debut album. Earmilk premiered the track "Don't Clap on the One and the Three" in October 2012. Chang released the self-titled debut album, Bay Blue, under his Bay Blue moniker on Anticon in November 2012. Andrew Martin of Potholes in My Blog said: "Like a history lesson in 20th century American music, Bay Blue draws from everything from big bands to string quartets to jazz duos to create something that's actually quite contemporary." A music video was created for the track "Take It Back Time" off of the album.

== Style and influences ==
In a 2012 interview, Matt Chang talked about his music making process:

"Digging through records, and deciding what to use and what not to use is the most labor intensive and time consuming part of the music making process for me. The chopping and arranging of the samples is the fun part. [...] As a beat maker, my first impulse is always to have the drums bang, but I realized early on that one of the keys to getting the songs to sound other-than-contemporary was to have the drums low in the mix, but to still have them very present. It took a lot of time to find the drums that gave me the sound that I wanted. [...] Sample selection was also important because I needed samples that were flexible enough for me to make a lot of variations to sequences. I wanted the sequences to be constantly changing – building, breaking down and then building back up again. Sometimes I would spend hours on a section or transition that would play for like two seconds and never comes back in."

"I wanted to compose songs rather than just make beats [...] so in straining for a substitute for the emcee, it felt natural to study jazz musicians and the way instruments can become vocalizations. As a part of that process, many of these songs in a very organic way took on the form of jazz numbers, with frequent tempo changes (sometimes obvious and sometimes barely noticeable), subtle and shifting drums, minimal effects, and something like the thrill of improvisation."

== Discography ==
=== Albums ===
- Bay Blue (2012) as Bay Blue

=== Singles ===
- He Did Glass Music (2003) as Sixtoo & Matth

=== Productions ===
- Sole – "Becoming Became Undone" from "Bottle of Humans" (1999)
- Sole – "I Don't Rap in Bumper Stickers" "Suicide Song" "Our Dirty Big Secret" from Bottle of Humans (2000)
- Sole – "I Have Since Moved on..." from uck rt (2001)
- Neila – "Love Obscure" from Vertical Trees with Eternal Leaves (2003)
- Themselves – "Mouthful (Matth & Controller 7 Remix)" from The No Music of AIFFs (2003)
- Pedestrian – "The Lifelong Liquidation Sale (1850–1950)" "The Dead of a Day" "Anticon." "Field Reports from the Financial District" "Jane 2: Electric Boogaloo" "Blind Dates" from Volume One: UnIndian Songs (2005)
- Sole – "Theme" from Live from Rome (2005)

=== Compilation appearances ===
- The Pedestrian – "Bright Moments" from Music for the Advancement of Hip Hop (1999)
- Pedestrian – "Dead Beats, Generation of" from Ropeladder 12 (2000)
