= Exiles (comics) =

Exiles, in comics, may refer to:

- Exiles (Malibu Comics), one of two series published in 1993 and 1995 by Malibu Comics
- Exiles (Marvel Comics), a Marvel Comics superhero team
  - Exiles (comic book), a series published by Marvel Comics starting in 2001

== See also ==
- Exile (disambiguation)
