= Pissing in the Wind =

Pissing in the wind is an expression that means a futile effort. It may also refer to:

- "Pissing in the Wind", a song by the British musician Badly Drawn Boy released in his album The Hour of Bewilderbeast
- "Pissing in the Wind", a song by Sole and the Skyrider Band released in their album Plastique
- "Pissin' in the Wind", a song by Jerry Jeff Walker released in his 1975 album Ridin' High
- "Piss in the Wind", a 2026 album by Japanese-Australian singer-songwriter Joji
