= Telephone Jim Jesus =

American alternative hip hop producer

- Born: George Chadwick; New London, New Hampshire
- Origin: Oakland, California
- Genres: Alternative hip hop, instrumental hip hop
- Occupation: Producer
- Years active: 2001–present
- Labels: Anticon
- Member of: Restiform Bodies
- Formerly of: Furious Stylz
- Website: www.anticon.com

George Chadwick, better known by his stage name Telephone Jim Jesus, is an alternative hip hop producer based in Oakland, California. He is a member of Restiform Bodies along with Passage and Bomarr.

== History ==
Telephone Jim Jesus released his debut solo album, A Point Too Far to Astronaut, on Anticon in 2004.

His second solo album, Anywhere Out of the Everything, was released on Anticon in 2007. He toured the United States with Sole and the Skyrider Band in the next year.

He formed the group Furious Stylz with drummer John Wagner and producer Skyrider.

== Discography ==
=== Solo ===
- A Point Too Far to Astronaut (2004)
- Anywhere Out of the Everything (2007)

=== Telephone Jim Jesus & The Bomarr Monk ===
- Live at the Chapel of the Chimes (2006)

=== Restiform Bodies ===
- Restiform Bodies (2001)
- TV Loves You Back (2008)

=== Productions ===
- Sole - "Da Baddest Poet" "Ode to the War on Terrorism" from Selling Live Water (2003)
- Sole - "Locust Farm" from Live from Rome (2005)

=== Contributions ===
- Passage - "Old Aunt Mary" "Suffragette" "Pail of Air" from The Forcefield Kids (2004)
- Pedestrian - "The History Channel..." from Volume One: UnIndian Songs (2005)
- Alias & Tarsier - "Dr. C" from Brookland/Oaklyn (2006)
