= Death Drive (album) =

Studio album by Sole & DJ Pain 1
- Released: June 9, 2014
- Genre: Hip-hop
- Length: 50:56
- Label: Black Canyon
- Producer: DJ Pain 1

Sole & DJ Pain 1 chronology
Death Drive (2014)	Nihilismo (2016)

Professional ratings
Review scores
Source	Rating
Alarm	favorable
RapReviews.com	8/10
The Skinny	3/5 stars
Truthout	favorable

Death Drive is the first collaborative studio album by Sole & DJ Pain 1. It was released on June 9, 2014. It features guest appearances from Decomposure, Pedestrian, and Sean Bonnette. Sole described it as "a political rap album executed in a way that eschews the rapper persona of savior/prophet and speaks from the riot line."

== Critical reception ==
Jessica Steinhoff of Alarm gave the album a favorable review, saying: "The duo examines the concept of heroism through beats and wordplay, taking aim at idols like Steve Jobs and Sigmund Freud in the process." On the week of June 6, 2014, Spin included it on the "10 Albums to Stream" list. Westword included it on the "31 Best Colorado Albums of 2014" list.

== Track listing ==
No.	Title	Length
1.	"Death Drive"	3:43
2.	"The Gauntlet"	3:24
3.	"Don't Riot"	3:56
4.	"Baghdad Shake"	3:41
5.	"War" (featuring Decomposure)	4:25
6.	"The Janitor's Son" (featuring Pedestrian)	3:34
7.	"Rap Game Darwin"	3:17
8.	"Coal" (featuring Decomposure)	5:33
9.	"Hey Liberals" (featuring Jesse Lester)	3:49
10.	"Y.D.E.L.O."	3:39
11.	"Old Gods Ain't Dead" (featuring Sean Bonnette)	4:24
12.	"Unscorch the Earth"	2:56
13.	"The Teachings of Cube"	4:34
