= Volume One: UnIndian Songs =

Studio album by Pedestrian
- Released: January 25, 2005
- Genre: Hip-hop
- Length: 41:47
- Label: Anticon
- Producers: Jel, Matt Chang, Why?, Alias

Pedestrian chronology
| Volume One: UnIndian Songs (2005) | UnIndian II (2017) |

Singles from Volume One: UnIndian Songs
- 1. "The Toss & Turn / Arrest the President" Released: November 8, 2004

Professional ratings
Review scores
| Source | Rating |
|---|---|
| AllMusic | 4/5 stars |
| Billboard | favorable |
| Christgau's Consumer Guide | (dud) |
| Cokemachineglow | 58% |
| Drowned in Sound | 8/10 |
| Filter Mini | 87% |
| Luna Kafé | favorable |
| Pitchfork | 7.4/10 |
| Spin | favorable |
| Urban Smarts | 59/100 |

Volume One: UnIndian Songs is the first studio album by American rapper and Anticon co-founder Pedestrian. It was released on Anticon in 2005. It features contributions from Doseone, Why?, Sole, and Jel, among others. In 2004, "The Toss & Turn / Arrest the President" was released as a single from the album. The album peaked at number 17 on the Dusted Top 40 Radio Chart.

== Critical reception ==
Louis Vlack of Filter Mini gave the album an 87% rating, describing it as "a daunting collection of (mostly) rapped sermons that manages to pull together three decades of hip-hop music, 40 plus years of world politics, and a century of American poetry." He added: "Know-it-allism never sounded so crunk." Mike Diver of Drowned in Sound gave the album an 8 out of 10, calling it "a breathtaking effort, easily exceeding any pre-release expectations."

Brian Howe of Pitchfork gave the album a 7.4 out of 10, saying, "a large part of Anticon's appeal has been its capacity to surprise, and while Pedestrian's record befuddles, proselytizes, and fascinates, it rarely strays from the established palette." Ron Hart of Billboard said, "Volume One is a fine step in the right direction for these guys, and a fine starting point for those looking to explore this most unique collective."

== Track listing ==
All tracks are written by Pedestrian, except "Arrest the President" by Pedestrian, Jel, and Sole.

| No. | Title | Producer(s) | Length |
|---|---|---|---|
| 1. | "Sermon on the Subject of Death, Part One" | | 0:45 |
| 2. | "O Hosanna" | Jel | 4:54 |
| 3. | "The Lifelong Liquidation Sale (1850-1950)" | Matt Chang, Why? | 0:36 |
| 4. | "The Lifelong Liquidation Sale (1850-1950)" | Matt Chang, Why? | 3:26 |
| 5. | "Sermon on the Subject of Death, Part Two" | | 1:33 |
| 6. | "O Silent Bed" | Alias | 2:58 |
| 7. | "The Dead of a Day" | Matt Chang, Why? | 3:22 |
| 8. | "Arrest the President" | Jel | 3:31 |
| 9. | "The History Channel..." | | 1:05 |
| 10. | "Anticon." | Matt Chang | 4:32 |
| 11. | "Field Reports from the Financial District" | Matt Chang | 3:36 |
| 12. | "The Toss & Turn" | Jel | 4:21 |
| 13. | "Jane 2: Electric Boogaloo" | Matt Chang, Why? | 2:47 |
| 14. | "Blind Dates" | Matt Chang | 4:23 |

== Personnel ==
Credits adapted from liner notes.

- Pedestrian – vocals
- Jel – vocals (2, 8, 10, 12), production (2, 8, 12)
- Why? – vocals (2, 7, 10, 13), keyboards (3, 4, 7, 13, 14), guitar (7, 13), bass guitar (14), production (3, 4, 7, 13)
- Lucy – vocals (2)
- Henry Davidson – guitar (3, 4)
- Matt Chang – production (3, 4, 7, 10, 11, 13, 14)
- Alias – vocals (6, 10), production (6)
- Doseone – vocals (6, 10)
- Tia – vocals (6)
- Sole – vocals (7, 8, 14)
- Telephone Jim Jesus – guitar (9)
- Passage – vocals (10)
- Jerome Opena – guitar (10)
- Jason Chavez – vocals (13)
- Kaaj – vocals (14)
- Shorty the Cat – vocals (14)
- Moshe – saxophone (14)
