= A Point Too Far to Astronaut =

Studio album by Telephone Jim Jesus
- Released: November 8, 2004
- Genre: Instrumental hip hop
- Length: 38:30
- Label: Anticon
- Producer: Telephone Jim Jesus

Telephone Jim Jesus chronology
A Point Too Far to Astronaut (2004)	Anywhere Out of the Everything (2007)

A Point Too Far to Astronaut is the debut studio album by American hip hop producer Telephone Jim Jesus. It was released on Anticon in 2004. It peaked at number 150 on the CMJ Radio 200 chart.

== Critical reception ==
Professional ratings
Review scores
Source	Rating
Cokemachineglow	81%
Inthemix	favorable
Splendid Magazine	favorable
Tiny Mix Tapes	3.5/5 stars

Sarah Zachrich of Splendid Magazine gave the album a favorable review, saying, "Telephone Jim Jesus will appeal to fans of both instrumental hip hop and more ambient fare; A Point Too Far to Astronaut's music is fairly unstructured, but never floats too far into the stratosphere." Chadwicked of Tiny Mix Tapes called it "a passive-aggressive album that makes a great impact with subtle nuances."

Cokemachineglow placed it at number 47 on the "Top 50 Albums 2004" list.

== Track listing ==
No.	Title	Length
1.	"War Toy"	2:14
2.	"Bathroom Mirror"	2:45
3.	"I'm Not OK"	0:59
4.	"N=1 Trial"	2:22
5.	"Failure to Fly"	2:10
6.	"Untitled Private Landscape"	2:00
7.	"Guessing Tubes"	3:01
8.	"The Ouroboros Tongue"	1:07
9.	"Struck by Falling Object"	3:40
10.	"A Blindness Falls Pt. A"	0:24
11.	"A Blindness Falls Pt. B"	2:14
12.	"Blue in the Face"	2:15
13.	"Convertible Stingray"	1:31
14.	"Little Boy One Eye"	2:41
15.	"Sometimes"	3:44
16.	"Two Clasping What They Dream Is One Another"	5:30
Total length:		38:30

== Personnel ==
Credits adapted from liner notes.

- Telephone Jim Jesus – production, mixing, illustration
- Pedestrian – vocals (4, 6, 10, 11, 16)
- Passage – vocals (13)
- Odd Nosdam – additional mixing (1, 4, 5, 7, 16), art direction
- Jeremy Goody – mastering
