= Naked Dinner =

Studio album by Time
- Released: August 25, 2009
- Genre: Alternative hip-hop
- Length: 58:54
- Label: Dirty Laboratory Productions
- Producer: Awareness, Doctype, Satyr, Time, Abstrakt, Sole, Broken, Tullie the Rapper

Time chronology
The Fantastic Reality (2007)	Naked Dinner (2009)	Newstalgia (2013)

Professional ratings
Review scores
Source	Rating
RapReviews.com	4/10
Westword	favorable

Naked Dinner is the third solo album by American hip-hop musician Time. It was released on August 25, 2009, on Dirty Laboratory Productions in association with Hip Hop Vinyl. It features guest appearances from C-Rayz Walz and Sole. In early 2010, Naked Dinner charted at #19 in the nation on the CMJ hip-hop charts.

== Track listing ==
No.	Title	Producer	Length
1.	"End of the Fork" (featuring Damon Jevon)	Awareness	2:47
2.	"Cockroach Goddess"	Doctype	4:18
3.	"Naked Brunch"	Awareness	2:35
4.	"Portobello Cloud" (featuring Damon Jevon)	Awareness	3:35
5.	"Sour Life"	Awareness	3:41
6.	"Subterranean Homesick News" (featuring Extra Kool)	Satyr	4:11
7.	"Naked Dinner"	Doctype	3:45
8.	"Paraghnoid" (featuring C-Rayz Walz and Damon Jevon)	Awareness	4:17
9.	"This Is Hell"	Time	2:47
10.	"Sorry for the Sorries"	Abstrakt	2:43
11.	"And We All Get Along"	Awareness	3:12
12.	"Trouble with Kids" (featuring Sole)	Sole	2:58
13.	"I Got the Fear!!!"	Doctype	4:19
14.	"It Never Came" (featuring Damon Jevon)	Awareness	4:22
15.	"Don't Grow Up"	Awareness	3:38
16.	"I Write with a Scalpel"	Broken	2:47
17.	"Goodbye Fool World" (featuring Damon Jevon)	Time	2:42
18.	"Peace Paranoia"	Tullie the Rapper	4:18
