= Decomposure =

Canadian electronic music musician

Decomposure (a.k.a. Caleb Mueller) is a Canadian electronic music musician, releasing his work on the Unschooled Label and on his own Blank Squirrel label, as well as being featured on multiple compilations. Mueller is also a graphic and visual artist.

== On Unschooled Records (2003–2007) ==
Decomposure made his full-length debut with 2004's Taking Things Apart, which featured experimental songs built from electronically deconstructed sounds culled from many disparate sources, including a Scrabble game, wooden matches, and a speech by US President George W. Bush. This was followed by the release of 2005's At Home and Unaffected, which was built with sounds recorded from Decomposure's apartment and featured a new direction toward instrumentation and vocals.

== On Blank Squirrel (2007–2019) ==
Following the collapse of the Unschooled Records label in 2007, Caleb Mueller created his own label under the name Blank Squirrel and released Vertical Lines A, an ambitious multi-genre album made from the first eleven hours of a 23-hour recording on cassette. It featured heavily abstracted songwriting, complex unconventional time signature. The album came with a bonus DVD and handmade album art.

In 2008, the full-length Humidity Patient Guide, his second release for Blank Squirrel Musics, was made available as a free download on the record label's website. Humidity Patient Guide is one continuous track, instead of a more traditional track-by-track format. The different sections of the track remain untitled.

In 2009 he recorded a 6-song EP, North Carolina, which was released free on the Blank Squirrel site. Songs from Old Headphones, a compilation of older unreleased songs, remixes and instrumentals, was also made available on the website in December along with a collection of comedy sketch recordings entitled The Velvet Rain: The Effective Edge Podcast's Best Sketches 2005-2007.

In May 2010, Blank Squirrel released the first of a series of weekly podcasts, introducing Decomposure's new goal of recording a song each week to be released on the podcast, and announcing that the Horizontal Lines B project would be put on hold. In 2012, songs from those podcasts were sequenced into an album called Eating Chicken. In the following year, the leftovers from that album were released in a compilation called Drinking Gravy.

In 2013, Decomposure began collaborating with other musicians, featuring in songs produced by Sole, Man Mantis, and DJ Pain 1, and appearing in a music video for one of Sole and DJ Pain 1's self-described "agitprop" collaborative albums Death Drive, Nihilismo and No God Nor Country.

== Search Engine Optimization (since 2020) ==
In November 2020, Caleb released a new EP under the moniker Search Engine Optimization. The EP featured production from DJ Pain 1 and Man Mantis.

== Discography ==
=== Full-length albums ===
- Taking Things Apart (Unschooled Records, 2004)
- At Home and Unaffected (Unschooled Records, 2005)
- Vertical Lines A (Blank Squirrel, 2007)
- Humidity Patient Guide (Blank Squirrel, 2008)
- Songs From Old Headphones (Blank Squirrel, 2009)
- Eating Chicken (Blank Squirrel, 2012)
- Drinking Gravy (Blank Squirrel, 2013)
- The Great Grey Beast (Blank Squirrel, 2013)
- Grow Together (Blank Squirrel, 2017)

=== EPs ===
- uodsn: Sound Rearranged (Self-Released, 2002)
- North Carolina (Blank Squirrel Musics, 2009)
- I (as Search Engine Optimization) (Self-released, 2020)

=== Compilations ===
- A Very Unschooled Christmas (Unschooled Records, 2004)
