= Newstalgia =

Studio album by Time
- Released: October 29, 2013
- Genres: Alternative hip-hop, political hip-hop, underground hip-hop
- Length: 68:30
- Label: Dirty Laboratory Productions
- Producers: Akira the Don, Torley, Budo, Giuseppe, Tall City, Satyre, Jake One, Factor Chandelier, Man Mantis, Time, IG88, Ephelant, Doctype, A Thousand Vows

Time chronology
Naked Dinner (2009)	Newstalgia (2013)

Professional ratings
Review scores
Source	Rating
Rap Reviews	7/10

Newstalgia is a 2013 studio album by American hip-hop artist Time. It was released on October 29, 2013, and features contributions from Budo, Jake One, Factor Chandelier, Xiu Xiu, and Ceschi, among others.

== Track listing ==
No.	Title	Producer(s)	Length
1.	"Newstalgia" (featuring Katie Gold)	Akira the Don and Torley	2:57
2.	"Auto Bio"	Budo	2:32
3.	"Swag Through the Giftshop" (featuring Kit Richardson)	Giuseppe	3:36
4.	"5th Horseman" (featuring K. Raydio and Lonnie Lynn)	Tall City	5:25
5.	"Shout for the Voiceless" (featuring Maudlin Magpie)	Satyre	3:19
6.	"Cardboard Gods" (featuring Maudlin Magpie)	Jake One	3:20
7.	"8 Bit Memories" (featuring Xiu Xiu)	Giuseppe	3:44
8.	"Black and Gold"	Factor Chandelier	2:51
9.	"Love in the Time of Rap" (featuring Chloe O)	Man Mantis	3:38
10.	"They Call Us the Irish" (featuring Ron Miles)	Time	3:47
11.	"Nona" (featuring Ceschi)	Satyre	4:48
12.	"Brittle Action Figures" (featuring Chris Barron)	IG88	4:16
13.	"Break the State"	Satyre	3:46
14.	"Writer's Shot" (featuring Jason Horodyski)	Ephelant	4:20
15.	"October 31st 1990 Something"	Doctype	4:09
16.	"No More Bad Dreams" (featuring Kate Warner)	Ephelant	4:12
17.	"This Is Not an Exit" (featuring Jason Horodyski)	A Thousand Vows	3:09
18.	"Death Bed" (featuring Nonnahs)	Ephelant	4:33
