= Hello Cruel World (Sole and the Skyrider Band album) =

Studio album by Sole and the Skyrider Band
- Released: July 19, 2011
- Genre: Hip-hop
- Length: 52:58
- Label: Fake Four Inc.
- Producer: Bud Berning; John Wagner

Sole and the Skyrider Band chronology
Plastique (2009)	Hello Cruel World (2011)

Hello Cruel World is the third studio album by Sole and the Skyrider Band. It was released on Fake Four Inc. on July 19, 2011. Music videos were created for the following songs: "Napoleon", "D.I.Y.", "Hello Cruel World", "Bad Captain Swag", and "Immortality".

== Critical reception ==
Professional ratings
Aggregate scores
Source	Rating
Metacritic	66/100
Review scores
Source	Rating
AllMusic	3.5/5 stars
Exclaim!	favorable
Pitchfork	6.1/10
Potholes in My Blog	4/5 stars
The Skinny	4/5 stars
Westword	favorable

At Metacritic, a platform that collects music reviews from leading mainstream critics, the album received an average score of 66, based on 6 reviews, indicating a "generally favorable review".

Tom Briehan of Pitchfork gave the album a rating of 6.1 out of 10, stating that "Sole has largely curbed his frantic, out-of-control, sometimes-arrhythmic rap style, going for a measured and controlled thing instead." David Jeffries of AllMusic gave the album 3.5 stars out of 5, writing, "the album's title references Sole's desire to bring the underground angst to the masses, injecting a little ugliness and art into your everyday programming." Thomas Quinlan of Exclaim! said, "While it's unlikely Hello Cruel World will reach far beyond Sole's current fan base, it should continue to impress those who are already fans, offering a slightly different perspective on the unorthodox MC."

Westword included it on the "Denver's Best Music Releases of 2011" list.

== Track listing ==
No.	Title	Length
1.	"Napoleon" (featuring Xiu Xiu)	4:16
2.	"D.I.Y."	3:47
3.	"Hello Cruel World"	4:28
4.	"Fire"	2:51
5.	"Bad Captain Swag" (featuring Lil B and Pictureplane)	5:01
6.	"We Will Not Be Moved" (featuring Ceschi and Noah23)	4:58
7.	"Possimism"	3:14
8.	"Home Ain't Shit" (written by Pedestrian)	4:18
9.	"Formal Designation 134340"	3:45
10.	"Immortality"	4:25
11.	"Progress Trap" (featuring Sage Francis)	3:54
12.	"Vaya Con el Diablo" (featuring Ceschi, Isaiah Toothtaker, and Mestizo)	4:15
13.	"Villon"	3:44
Total length:		52:58

== Personnel ==
Credits adapted from liner notes.

Sole and the Skyrider Band

- Tim Holland – vocals, lyrics
- Bud Berning – programming, production, arrangement
- William Ryan Fritch – instrumentation, vocals, arrangement
- John Wagner – drum programming, production

Additional musicians

- Xiu Xiu – vocals (1), lyrics (1)
- Lil B – vocals (5), lyrics (5)
- Pictureplane – vocals (5), lyrics (5)
- Ceschi – vocals (6, 12), lyrics (6, 12)
- Noah23 – vocals (6), lyrics (6)
- Pedestrian – lyrics (8)
- Sage Francis – vocals (11), lyrics (11)
- Isaiah Toothtaker – vocals (12), lyrics (12)
- Mestizo – vocals (12), lyrics (12)

Technical personnel

- Jesse O'Brien – mixing
- Tom Capek – mastering
- Lando – cover art
- Michael Crigler – art direction, design
- The Raincoat Man – vinyl layout
