= Sole and the Skyrider Band (album) =

Studio album by Sole and the Skyrider Band
- Released: October 23, 2007
- Genre: Hip-hop
- Length: 55:14
- Label: Anticon
- Producer: Bud Berning

Sole and the Skyrider Band chronology
Sole and the Skyrider Band (2007)	Plastique (2009)

Sole and the Skyrider Band is the first studio album by Sole and the Skyrider Band. It was released on Anticon on October 23, 2007.

== Critical reception ==
Professional ratings
Review scores
Source	Rating
AllMusic	favorable
Dusted Magazine	mixed
Pitchfork	6.8/10
PopMatters	8/10 stars
The Skinny	4/5 stars

Johnny Langlands of The Skinny gave the album 4 stars out of 5, commenting that "this particular collaboration may be the proverbial slow burner, but trust that the rewards start unfurling by the third listen." Anthony Tognazzini of AllMusic wrote, "Muscular and textural, the Skyrider band supplanted Sole's previously digital soundscapes with an organic sound, lending the perfect backdrop to his complex flows and nimble wordplay." Grayson Haver Currin of Pitchfork gave the album a 6.8 out of 10, calling it Sole's "most consistently engaging album to date."

== Track listing ==
No.	Title	Length
1.	"A Sad Day for Investors"	4:25
2.	"Ghost Assassinating Other Ghosts"	5:29
3.	"Nothing Is Free"	3:32
4.	"The Bridges Let Us Down"	3:23
5.	"A Hundred Light Years and Running"	3:49
6.	"The Shipwreckers"	3:50
7.	"Sound of Head on Concrete"	3:17
8.	"Magnum"	4:24
9.	"The Bones of My Pets"	4:11
10.	"In Paradise"	4:57
11.	"One Egg Short of the Omelette"	3:28
12.	"On Cavalry"	5:05
13.	"Stupid Things Implode on Themselves"	5:29
Total length:		55:14

== Personnel ==
Credits adapted from liner notes.

Sole and the Skyrider Band

- Tim Holland – vocals, lyrics
- Bud Berning – guitar, bass guitar, double bass, synthesizer, sampler, drum programming, production, arrangement, mixing
- William Ryan Fritch – guitar, bass guitar, mandolin, violin, cello, saxophone, clarinet, flute, glockenspiel, vibraphone, keyboards, synthesizer
- John Wagner – drums, percussion

Technical personnel

- Alias – mixing
- Doug Krebs – mastering
- Ravi Zupa – artwork, logo
- Sam Flax Keener – layout
