= Restiform Bodies (band) =

American hip-hop group

- Genres: Alternative hip-hop, indie hip-hop
- Years active: 2000–present
- Labels: Anticon, Weapon-Shaped, 6months
- Members: Passage; Bomarr; Telephone Jim Jesus
- Website: www.anticon.com

Restiform Bodies is an alternative hip-hop trio based in San Francisco, California. It consists of rapper Passage and producers Bomarr and Telephone Jim Jesus. The band was signed to Anticon throughout its existence.

== History ==
Passage and Bomarr (then known as The Bomarr Monk) self-released the album Moods & Symptoms in 2000. Soon after, Passage formed Restiform Bodies with his high school friends Bomarr and Telephone Jim Jesus. Their self-titled debut album, Restiform Bodies, was released on 6months in 2001.

In 2002, the band toured across the United States and Canada with Sole and Kevin Blechdom.

Restiform Bodies released their Anticon debut, TV Loves You Back, in 2008. In promotion of the album, the band toured nationally with their labelmate Why?.

== Discography ==
=== Albums ===
- Oubliette (2000)
- Restiform Bodies (2001)
- Sun Hop Flat (2001)
- TV Loves You Back (2008)
- TV Loves You Back: Remixes (2013)

=== Singles ===
- "I Want What You Want" b/w "Recycle America" (2003)

=== Compilation appearances ===
- "Sippy Cup" on Anticon Label Sampler: 1999–2004 (2004)
