= Calm (group) =

American hip hop group

- Origin: Denver, Colorado, United States
- Genres: Hip hop
- Years active: 2002–2010
- Label: Dirty Laboratory Productions
- Members: Time; AwareNess

Calm is an American hip hop group from Denver, Colorado. It consists of Time and AwareNess. The duo released their album Anti-Smiles in 2006.

== History ==
In 2006, Calm released Anti-Smiles. Jordan Selbo of Rap Reviews gave the album 7 out of 10. Tom Murphy of Westword gave it a favorable review, writing: "Although Anti-Smiles reflects the dark side of our collective psyche, it's also a statement of hope in the face of fear and self-doubt." It was named the intellectual hip-hop album of the year by Hip-Hop Linguistics.

In 2008, Calm performed in a hip-hop show along with Reflect June, Tullie, Ancient Mith, and Mr. Dibbs.

Calm's last reported performance was in 2010, introducing a song by Time called "Pink UFO", in support of a Denver ballot initiative to create an Extraterrestrial Affairs Commission.

== Discography ==
=== Studio albums ===
- Anti-Smiles (2006)
- Things I Learned While Dying in Denver (2018)

=== Compilation appearances ===
- "Treat Me Like a Villain" on Offbeaters Vol. 3 (2006)
- "Depression" on Calderas of Mind (2006)
