= The Dreamer/The Believer =

Studio album by Common
- Released: December 19, 2011
- Recorded: 2009–2011
- Studio: 4220 Studios (Los Angeles); EastWest (Hollywood); Record One (Los Angeles)
- Genre: Hip-hop
- Length: 50:46
- Label: Think Common; Warner Bros.
- Producer: No I.D. (also exec.); Common (co-exec.); Derek Dudley (co-exec.); Mike Chavez (co-exec.)

Common chronology
Universal Mind Control (2008)	The Dreamer/The Believer (2011)	Nobody's Smiling (2014)

Singles from The Dreamer/The Believer
- 1. "Ghetto Dreams" Released: July 6, 2011; 2. "Blue Sky" Released: October 4, 2011; 3. "Sweet" Released: November 2, 2011; 4. "Celebrate" Released: November 21, 2011; 5. "Raw (How You Like It)" Released: December 13, 2011

The Dreamer/The Believer is the ninth studio album by American rapper Common. It was released in the UK on December 19, 2011 and in the US on December 20 through Warner Bros. Records alongside Common's newly launched Think Common Music Inc. Common's longtime friend and frequent collaborator No I.D. handled the album's production entirely himself.

== Background ==
Recording sessions for the album began in 2009, and was originally due for a spring release, but was not completed because Common wanted to concentrate on acting. The album was scheduled for an April 2011 release, but was pushed back to late 2011. The first single was "Ghetto Dreams" featuring Nas. The music video was directed by Matt Alonzo and executive produced by Leah Harmony. It was released on iTunes July 6, 2011. In preparation for the album's release, Common spoke with The BoomBox about how the LP was taking shape and that he and No I.D. were crafting the album in a more positive direction: "It's going to be positive hip-hop. Hip-hop that can really generate good spirit, the spirit of the music and just good energy. I'm excited about the album 'The Dreamer, The Believer'. I feel blessed that I got to work with No I.D. I'm enthused to do hip-hop, which is something that I have to do when I feel it. It's the spirit and energy of hip-hop that made you just enjoy it and love the music and not feel like, 'Man, is this gonna sell?' or 'I sold this many.' It's stuff that made you feel something, it's stuff that you can use that inspired your life. I think about hip-hop like Brand Nubian and KRS-One and N.W.A and Rakim, that stuff inspired my life. Those things really shaped who I am." The Target Exclusive Edition comes with two additional tracks.

The second single off the album was "Blue Sky" which was officially made available on iTunes October 7, 2011. The song samples "Mr. Blue Sky" by Electric Light Orchestra.

== Controversies ==
After releasing the single "Sweet," the blog-sphere was ablaze with speculation regarding the song's possible target. Many hip hop blogs guessed the song might be about rapper Drake, as he often interjects singing into his raps and "Sweet" makes critical jabs at singing rappers. Common insisted "Sweet" was about anyone who feels it and not specifically written for any person, but at a concert in L.A., Drake fired shots widely seen as directed towards Common, and on January 6, 2012, Drake once again responded on a track called "Stay Schemin'" from Rick Ross' new mixtape Rich Forever. This resulted in Common remixing the same track with his own verse and the lines "I’m taking too long with this amateur guy, You ain’t wet nobody, n****, you Canada Dry". The feud has since settled down with the two eventually coming face to face at the Grammys, on February 12, 2012. Not long after the Grammys, the two were photographed together after Drake greeted Common at the NBA All-Star game.

== Reception ==
=== Critical response ===
Professional ratings
Aggregate scores
Source	Rating
Metacritic	74/100
Review scores
Source	Rating
AllMusic	3.5/5 stars
Chicago Tribune	3/4 stars
Entertainment Weekly	A−
The Independent	5/5 stars
Pitchfork	7.6/10
PopMatters	6/10
Rolling Stone	3/5 stars
Slant Magazine	3.5/5 stars
USA Today	3.5/4 stars
XXL	(XL)

The Dreamer/The Believer received generally positive reviews from music critics. At Metacritic, which assigns a weighted mean rating out of 100 to reviews from mainstream critics, the album received an average score of 74, based on 26 reviews, which indicates "generally favorable reviews".

The Independent gave the album all five stars and said of Common, "That he manages to express such ethical and religious principles without coming across like a sanctimonious buzz-killer is quite remarkable." In his Consumer Guide, Robert Christgau gave it a three-star honorable mention while picking out two songs from the album ("Raw [How You Like It]" and "The Believer"), and quipped about Common, "Still on a major label, he's damn well gonna act it."

Even more positive results came in. DJ Booth gave it a score of four-and-a-half spins out of five and quipped, "Together the two vets have created a work that's worthy of some serious recognition." HipHopDX also gave it a score of four-and-a-half out of five and said that every song "succeeds off the strength of Common and No I.D.'s seasoned chemistry." RapReviews gave it a score of 8.5 out of 10 and stated, "This isn't an album of 1990's styles brought to 2012 - these are contemporary beats and rhymes that can hang with anything else coming out on the scene." Consequence of Sound gave it a score of three-and-a-half stars out of five and said it "doesn't really spark until you fold in a few of the harder tracks." BBC Music gave it a favorable review and said that Common "merges his raw lyrical roots with No I.D.'s voluminous soundtrack, resulting in a decent album far more celebratory than his previous work." Los Angeles Times gave it a score of two-and-a-half stars out of four and said that Common "continues to impress and regress."

Other reviews are average or mixed. Canadian magazine Now gave it a score of three out of five and said about Common, "Compared to his earlier work, it's just decent." The A.V. Club gave it a C and called it "a passable album of mostly neutral jams and bare-minimum production." Sputnikmusic gave it a score of two-and-a-half out of five and said it "shows him with his head in the clouds and addressing the same tired crowd with the same speech he's been writing for years."

=== Commercial performance ===
The album debuted at number eighteen on the US Billboard 200 chart, with 69,000 copies sold in its first week in the United States. As of July 2014, the album has sold 154,000 copies in the United States.

== Track listing ==
- All songs produced by No I.D.

No.	Title	Writer(s)	Length
1.	"The Dreamer" (featuring Maya Angelou)	Lonnie Lynn; Ernest Wilson; Maya Angelou; James Fauntleroy II	5:53
2.	"Ghetto Dreams" (featuring Nas)	Lynn; Wilson; Nasir Jones; Eddie Hazel	3:54
3.	"Blue Sky" (featuring Makeba Riddick)	Lynn; Wilson; Makeba Riddick	4:03
4.	"Sweet"	Lynn; Wilson	3:36
5.	"Gold"	Lynn; Wilson; Fauntleroy	4:19
6.	"Lovin' I Lost"	Lynn; Wilson	3:51
7.	"Raw (How You Like It)"	Lynn; Wilson; Hannah Sidibe; Riddick	3:55
8.	"Cloth"	Lynn; Wilson; Fauntleroy	4:34
9.	"Celebrate"	Lynn; Wilson; Fauntleroy	4:03
10.	"Windows"	Lynn; Wilson; Fauntleroy	4:00
11.	"The Believer" (featuring John Legend)	Lynn; Wilson; John Stephens	3:43
12.	"Pops Belief"	Lonnie "Pops" Lynn	4:55

Target Deluxe Edition Bonus Tracks
No.	Title	Writer(s)	Length
13.	"The Believer (Remix)"	Lynn; Wilson	3:23
14.	"Ghetto Dreams (Remix)"	Lynn; Wilson; Hazel; George Clinton	3:37

- Additional vocals by: Makeba Riddick (3, 7), James Fauntleroy II (1, 3, 5, 8, 9, 10), Hannah Sidibe (7, 9)

Sample credits

- "The Dreamer" contains a sample from "Rashida" by Jon Lucien
- "Ghetto Dreams" contains samples from "Let's Make It Last" by The Fellows and "Hope" by Nas
- "Blue Sky" contains a sample from "Mr. Blue Sky" by Electric Light Orchestra
- "Sweet" contains samples from "You Don't Have to Worry" by Doris & Kelley, "Action" by Orange Krush and "Remix for P Is Free" by Boogie Down Productions
- "Gold" contains samples from "The Jam" by Graham Central Station, "Stud-Spider" by Tony Joe White and "To Be True" by Harold Melvin & The Blue Notes
- "Lovin' I Lost" contains a sample from "I Loved And I Lost" by Curtis Mayfield
- "Celebrate" contains samples from "Celebrate Me Home" by Kenny Loggins and "I Got Some" by Sugar Billy Garner
- "Raw (How You Like It)" contains a sample from "Memory of Pain" by The Aynsley Dunbar Retaliation
- "Windows" contains a sample from "Candy Maker" by Tommy James & The Shondells, "Asleep in The Desert" by ZZ Top and "Tune" by Sam Spence

== Personnel ==
Credits for The Dreamer/The Believer adapted from Allmusic.

- Jason Agel – Engineer
- Maya Angelou – Composer, Poetry
- D. Burton – Composer
- Mike Chavez – A&R, Executive Producer
- George Clinton – Composer
- Common – Executive Producer
- Blake Douglas – Assistant Engineer
- Derek Dudley – Executive Producer, Management
- James Fauntleroy – Composer
- James Fauntleroy II – Vocals
- Kaye Fox – Vocals
- Kenny Gamble – Composer
- Larry Graham – Composer
- Eddie Hazel – Composer
- Derrick Hodge – Bass
- Leon Huff – Composer
- Bob James – Composer
- Rob Kinelski – Engineer, Mixing
- David Kutch – Mastering
- John Legend – Vocals
- Cara Lewis – Booking
- Sam Lewis – Assistant Engineer, Vocals
- Kenny Loggins – Composer
- Omar Loya – Assistant Engineer, Engineer
- Lonnie Lynn – Composer, Poetry
- Jeff Lynne – Composer
- Curtis Mayfield – Composer
- Percy Mayfield – Composer
- Matt Morris – Vocals
- Laurence Naber – Mixing Assistant
- No I.D. – Executive Producer, Producer
- Omoye – Vocals
- James Poyser – Keyboards
- Kevin Randolph – Keyboards
- Makeba Riddick – Composer, Vocals
- Hannah Sidibe – Composer, Vocals
- Chris Time Steele – Vocal Engineer
- J. Stephens – Composer
- Todd Sullivan – Sample Clearance
- Steven Taylor – Photography
- The Twilight Tone – Scratching
- Anna Ugarte – Assistant Engineer, Mixing Assistant
- Steve Wyreman – Bass, Composer, Guitar, Wurlitzer
- Danny Zook – Sample Clearance

== Charts ==
=== Weekly charts ===
Chart (2012)	Peak position
US Billboard 200	18
US Top R&B/Hip-Hop Albums (Billboard)	5

=== Year-end charts ===
Chart (2012)	Position
US Top R&B/Hip-Hop Albums (Billboard)	44
