= TV Loves You Back =

Studio album by Restiform Bodies
- Released: September 30, 2008
- Genre: Alternative hip-hop
- Length: 44:04
- Label: Anticon
- Producer: Restiform Bodies

Restiform Bodies chronology
Sun Hop Flat (2001)	TV Loves You Back (2008)	TV Loves You Back Remixes (2013)

Professional ratings
Review scores
Source	Rating
The A.V. Club	A−
East Bay Express	favorable
Exclaim!	favorable
Okayplayer	73/100
Performer Magazine	favorable
Pitchfork	7.1/10
PopMatters	4/10 stars
Remix	4/5
Soundcheck Magazine	favorable
URB	3.5/5 stars

TV Loves You Back is the fourth studio album by American hip-hop group Restiform Bodies. It was released on Anticon in 2008.

== Release ==
On July 22, 2008, "Bobby Trendy Addendum" became available digitally via Impose. On September 9, 2008, Tobacco's remix of "Panic Shopper" was posted by XLR8R. TV Loves You Back was released on September 30, 2008. A remix version of the album, TV Loves You Back Remixes, was released in 2013.

== Critical reception ==
Amorn Bholsangngam of URB gave the album 3.5 stars out of 5, saying, "TV Loves You Back is the closest to pop that Anticon may ever come, a refreshing change of pace for listeners weary of the heavy, serious musical soliloquies that the label specializes in." Vish Khanna of Exclaim! called it "the perfectly imperfect soundtrack to an information overloaded yet, ironically, attention deficit addled culture." Ande Pareti of Soundcheck Magazine wrote: "Each song on TV Loves You Back is a carefully concocted trip, and listening to the album in its entirety is delightful substance abuse."

Chris Martins of The A.V. Club gave the album a grade of A−, saying, "Passage's verses are hailstorms of cyberized imagery and sarcastic poetry, while producers Bomarr and Telephone Jim Jesus skip art-hop subtlety for beats that bang." Mark Keresman of East Bay Express said: "Like Public Enemy at their best, Restiform Bodies engage you with the beats and audacious flair then make you look long and hard into funhouse-warped, revealing mirrors."

== Track listing ==
No.	Title	Length
1.	"Black Friday"	3:17
2.	"Foul"	4:03
3.	"A Pimp-Like God"	5:20
4.	"Panic Shopper"	4:00
5.	"Consumer Culture Wave"	3:39
6.	"Bobby Trendy Addendum"	4:05
7.	"Pick It Up, Drop It"	5:47
8.	"Interactive Halloween Bear"	3:49
9.	"Opulent Soul"	5:59
10.	"Ameriscan"	3:56
