= Exiles Bookshop =

Sydney NSW bookshop

Coordinates: 33.881190°S 151.217540°E

- Company type: Private company
- Founded: 1979
- Founder: Susumu Hirayanagi, Nicholas Pounder
- Headquarters: 207 Oxford Street, Taylor Square, Sydney

Exiles Bookshop was a Sydney bookshop which hosted many poetry readings, and was something of a centre for the local poetry scene in the early 1980s. It was established, at 207 Oxford Street, Taylor Square, by Susumu Hirayanagi and Nicholas Pounder in February 1979, and it closed in late 1982.

Poetry readings were held there frequently, where local poets such as John Tranter, John Forbes, Rae Desmond Jones, Gig Ryan, Dorothy Porter, Kerry Leves, Laurie Duggan, Martin Johnston, Grant Caldwell, Les Wicks, Alan Jefferies and S. K. Kelen read their work. Luke Davies, winner of the 2012 Prime Minister's Literary Award for Poetry, first read in public there as a 19-year-old in 1981. Poets from other countries, including Hans Magnus Enzensberger, also visited the bookshop. Gary Snyder read there on 17 September 1981.
