= Mansbestfriend Pt. 2: No Thanks =

- 2003 edition cover

Studio album by Mansbestfriend
- Released: 2003
- Genre: Hip-hop
- Length: 38:42 (2003); 58:09 (2004)
- Label: Self-released (2003); Morr Music (2004)
- Producer: Sole

Mansbestfriend chronology
Mansbestfriend (2002)	Mansbestfriend Pt. 2: No Thanks (2003)	Mansbestfriend Pt. 3: My Own Worst Enemy (2005)

Mansbestfriend Pt. 2: No Thanks is a studio album by American hip-hop artist Sole. Originally self-released in 2003, the album was repackaged and remastered with additional tracks and released by Morr Music in 2004 under the title The New Human Is Illegal, with Sole using "Mansbestfriend" as an alternate moniker.

== Critical reception ==
Professional ratings
Review scores
Source	Rating
AllMusic (2003)	2.5/5 stars
AllMusic (2004)	3/5 stars
Cokemachineglow	mixed
Tiny Mix Tapes	2.5/5 stars

John Bush of AllMusic gave the album 3 stars out of 5, saying: "Give credit to Sole for turning the hip-hop hat trick; he has no trouble creating a glorious mess of a record in true Anticon style, but he also adds the hooks to keep listeners digging in, and remains an excellent rapper despite producing and performing." Scott Reid of Cokemachineglow said, "Sole does a great job at making this an unpredictable and consistently interesting barrage of layered vocals, non-sequitur pop samples and distorted beats, all meshed together in an extremely rough, muddled mix."

== Track listing ==
Mansbestfriend Pt. 2: No Thanks (2003)
No.	Title	Length
1.	"How to Be Rich and Powerful"	2:37
2.	"Ode to Clean Air"	2:45
3.	"Little Bank Anthem"	3:09
4.	"Hey Jim"	0:29
5.	"No Thanks"	2:08
6.	"The Devil's a Traveling Man"	3:15
7.	"Numb (Disco Version)"	2:22
8.	"You Are a Happy Camper"	0:17
9.	"In Defense of Culture"	2:37
10.	"Poor Is Cool"	3:30
11.	"Dream I Had on My 25th Birthday"	2:44
12.	"If You Dont Like My Music / How to Make a Hip Hop Beat"	12:21
Total length:		38:42

The New Human Is Illegal (2004)
No.	Title	Length
1.	"Class Action Suit Against Earth"	3:30
2.	"Idol Victim"	2:32
3.	"How to Be Rich and Powerful"	2:32
4.	"Ode to Clean Air"	2:45
5.	"Little Bank Anthem"	3:38
6.	"No Thanks"	2:09
7.	"The Devil's a Traveling Man"	3:15
8.	"Numb"	2:22
9.	"Dream About Afghanistan or Oakland"	3:08
10.	"Form Plus Prime Matter Equals Substance"	2:06
11.	"Be Happy"	4:19
12.	"Attack Russia"	3:55
13.	"Poor Is Cool"	3:28
14.	"Dream I Had on My 25th Birthday"	2:42
15.	"Great Open Grey"	2:55
16.	"If You Don't Like My Music"	12:46
Total length:		58:09

== Personnel ==
Credits adapted from the 2004 edition liner notes.

- Sole – music
- Odd Nosdam – additional keyboards (3), mixing (3–8, 13, 14, 16)
- Doseone – additional music (4, 6)
- Jel – additional music (4, 6)
- Telephone Jim Jesus – guitar (9), keyboards (9)
- Why? – drums (13)
- D&M – mastering
- Yasamin Al-Hussaini – cover
- Jan Kruse – cover
