= Restiform Bodies (album) =

Studio album by Restiform Bodies
- Released: August 14, 2001
- Recorded: 2000–2001
- Genre: Alternative hip-hop
- Length: 67:30
- Label: 6months
- Producers: Passage, The Bomarr Monk, Telephone Jim Jesus, Agent Six

Restiform Bodies chronology
Oubliette (2000)	Restiform Bodies (2001)	Sun Hop Flat (2001)

Professional ratings
Review scores
Source	Rating
AllMusic	4.5/5 stars
UKHH	favorable

Restiform Bodies is the second album and label debut by American alternative hip-hop group Restiform Bodies. It was released on 6months in 2001. It was preceded by a limited demo release entitled Suggestion Bulletin earlier in 2001, which featured all of the same tracks except for the additional "Magic Unicorn".

== Track listing ==
No.	Title	Length
1.	"Principles of Easy Listening (Pt. A)"	1:35
2.	"Principles of Easy Listening (Pt. B)"	4:55
3.	"Teleprompter"	2:38
4.	"Stuff About Dreaming (Old Old Old)"	2:57
5.	"Still Suit (Pt. A)"	3:39
6.	"Still Suit (Pt. B)"	0:55
7.	"Still Suit (Pt. C)"	2:11
8.	"Weather Balloon"	2:37
9.	"Wants For:"	1:56
10.	"Second Floor Apartment"	2:10
11.	"Installation II A) Birds"	5:09
12.	"Installation II B) Funny Squirty"	3:40
13.	"Installation II C) Rock 4 Life"	2:21
14.	"Installation II D) Prettiest Lights"	1:22
15.	"Keep Looking It's Worth It"	0:27
16.	"Dirty Porno Rug"	4:23
17.	"Bathroom Cipher (FAT)"	0:21
18.	"Our Old Cheesy Rap Anthem That Goes Ry Cooder Duh Nuh Nuh Nuh"	5:25
19.	"Busy Boner"	1:39
20.	"3rd Reel Judy Garland"	4:34
21.	"Stupid Human Button"	12:36
