= Bottle of Humans =

Studio album by Sole
- Released: August 8, 2000
- Genre: Hip-hop
- Length: 72:36
- Label: Anticon
- Producer: Controller 7; Matth; Jel; Daddy Kev; Alias; Odd Nosdam; Sixtoo; Sole; Raggedy Andy; Panic; Moodswing9; Scott Matelic; DJ Mayonnaise; Wes Bonifay

Sole chronology
Bottle of Humans (2000)	Selling Live Water (2003)

Singles from Bottle of Humans
- 1. "Bottle of Humans" Released: 1999

Bottle of Humans is the debut solo studio album by American hip-hop artist Sole. It was released on Anticon in 2000. It peaked at number 14 on CMJ's Top 25 Hip-Hop chart.

== Release ==
A dispute with Anticon's distributor caused the album to go out of print until it was remastered and reissued in 2003 with minor changes to the artwork and track listing.

"Nothing Fell Apart", "Understanding", and "MC Howard Hughes" were removed from the 2003 reissue. Also, on the cover art of the original issue, the words "sole" and "bottle of humans" appear to be pasted on. In the 2003 issue, the text is redone as it was meant to look, with no white border around the text.

== Critical reception ==
Professional ratings
Review scores
Source	Rating
AllMusic	4.5/5 stars
RapReviews	8/10

Stanton Swihart of AllMusic stated that, "at a diary-like 73 minutes, the album is too long to sustain the frequently gloomy psychological exploration, but this is maverick, outsider rap of a high quality." Steve Juon of RapReviews gave the album an 8 out of 10, saying, "If you're looking for a rap album that bucks trends and still has heavy hip-hop beats though, this is a good start." In 2008, Chris Martins of LA Weekly called it one of the "bona fide classics" from Anticon.

== Track listing ==
2000 original edition
No.	Title	Producer(s)	Length
1.	"Dismantling of Sole's Ego"	Controller 7	3:03
2.	"I Don't Rap in Bumper Stickers"	Matth	2:49
3.	"Tourist Trapeze"	Jel	3:13
4.	"Famous Last Words"	Daddy Kev	4:42
5.	"Bottle of Humans"	Alias	6:28
6.	"Man and Woman"	Odd Nosdam	1:50
7.	"Center City" (featuring Why?)	Jel	4:37
8.	"Furthermore"	Controller 7	4:03
9.	"Nothing Fell Apart" (featuring Sixtoo)	Sixtoo	3:00
10.	"Very Important Message"	Sole	0:56
11.	"Sole Has Issues"	Raggedy Andy	5:56
12.	"Our Dirty Big Secret" (featuring Alias, Doseone, and Pedestrian)	Matth	4:11
13.	"Save the Children"	Panic; Moodswing9	4:24
14.	"Suicide Song"	Matth	5:54
15.	"Year of the $exxx $ymbol"	Scott Matelic	4:09
16.	"Understanding"	Scott Matelic	4:49
17.	"MC Howard Hughes"	DJ Mayonnaise	3:41
18.	"Bottle of Leftovers"	Odd Nosdam	1:15
19.	"Home"	Wes Bonifay	3:37
Total length:			72:36

2003 reissue edition
No.	Title	Producer(s)	Length
1.	"Dismantling of Sole's Ego"	Controller 7	3:03
2.	"I Don't Rap in Bumper Stickers"	Matth	2:49
3.	"Tourist Trapeze"	Jel	3:13
4.	"Famous Last Words"	Daddy Kev	4:42
5.	"Bottle of Humans"	Alias	6:28
6.	"Man and Woman"	Odd Nosdam	1:50
7.	"Center City" (featuring Why?)	Jel	4:37
8.	"Furthermore"	Controller 7	4:03
9.	"Save the Children"	Panic; Moodswing9	4:24
10.	"Suicide Song"	Matth	5:54
11.	"Year of the $exxx $ymbol"	Scott Matelic	4:09
12.	"Very Important Message"	Sole	0:56
13.	"Sole Has Issues"	Raggedy Andy	5:56
14.	"Our Dirty Big Secret" (featuring Alias, Doseone, and Pedestrian)	Matth	4:11
15.	"Bottle of Leftovers"	Odd Nosdam	1:15
16.	"Home"	Wes Bonifay	3:37
Total length:			60:50
