= Bomarr =

American alternative hip hop producer

- Birth name: Matt Valerio
- Also known as: The Bomarr Monk
- Origin: San Francisco, California
- Genres: Alternative hip hop, instrumental hip hop
- Occupation: Producer
- Years active: 2000–present
- Labels: Anticon
- Website: www.bomarr.net

Matt Valerio, better known by his stage name Bomarr (formerly The Bomarr Monk), is an alternative hip hop producer based in San Francisco, California. He is a member of Restiform Bodies along with Passage and Telephone Jim Jesus.

== History ==
Bomarr released the album Moods & Symptoms with Passage in 2000. Throughout the production of the album, They formed Restiform Bodies with Telephone Jim Jesus in New London, New Hampshire.

Bomarr sent the demo to Anticon and the trio moved to San Francisco in 2001.

Remixes Vol. 1 was released in 2011. It is a compilation of the remixes Bomarr has done for Tunng, Sister Crayon, Pedestrian among others between 2005 and 2010.

== Discography ==
=== Solo ===
- Beats Being Broke (2002)
- Surface Sincerity (2003)
- Fetal Antiseptic Drama Party (2003)
- Surface Sincerity Soundtrack (2004)
- Freedom from Frightened Air (2007)
- Scraps (2007)
- iPhone Beats (2008)
- Remixes Vol. 1 (2011)
- Apparitions (2014)
- Ready For My Ride (2015)
- Steamroller (2015)

=== Passage & The Bomarr Monk ===
- Moods & Symptoms (2000)

=== Telephone Jim Jesus & The Bomarr Monk ===
- Live at the Chapel of the Chimes (2006)

=== Restiform Bodies ===
- Restiform Bodies (2001)
- TV Loves You Back (2008)
