= In Exile =

In Exile may refer to:

== Film and television ==
- In Exile (film) or Time Runner, a 1993 science fiction film
- In Exile (TV series), a 1998 UK sitcom

== Literature ==
- "In Exile" (short story), an 1892 short story by Anton Chekhov
- In Exile, a 1923 book by John Cournos
- In Exile, a 2008 short story collection by Billy O'Callaghan
- In Exile, a 1931 poetry collection by Ronald Ross

== Music ==
- In Exile (Sumsion), a 1981 motet by Herbert Sumsion
- In Exile (Michael Patrick Kelly album), 2003
- [In] Exile, an album by After the Fall, 2009
- In Exile, an album by the Gun Club, 1992
- "In Exile", a song by Lisa Gerrard from The Silver Tree, 2006
- "In Exile", a song by Thrice from the album Beggars, 2009
- "In Exile (For Rodrigo Rojas)", a song by the Dream Academy from Remembrance Days, 1987

== See also ==
- In Exile Deo, a 2004 album by Juliana Hatfield
