= Live from Rome =

Studio album by Sole
- Released: February 22, 2005
- Genre: Hip-hop
- Length: 51:39
- Label: Anticon
- Producer: Odd Nosdam; Alias; Controller 7; Telephone Jim Jesus; Yasamin; Tepr; Matt

Sole chronology
Selling Live Water (2003)	Live from Rome (2005)	A Ruthless Criticism of Everything Existing (2012)

Singles from Live from Rome
- 1. "New Single" Released: 2005

Live from Rome is a solo studio album by American hip-hop artist Sole. It was released on Anticon in 2005.

== Critical reception ==
Professional ratings
Aggregate scores
Source	Rating
Metacritic	62/100
Review scores
Source	Rating
Cokemachineglow	64/100
Dusted Magazine	favorable
Pitchfork	6.9/10
PopMatters	3/10 stars
Spin	B
Stylus Magazine	C
XLR8R	favorable

At Metacritic, which assigns a weighted average score out of 100 to reviews from mainstream critics, the album received an average score of 62, based on 9 reviews, indicating "generally favorable reviews".

Brian Howe of Pitchfork gave the album a 6.9 out of 10 and said, "Sole's socialist screeds work well when he raps them like he means them instead of couching them in layers of affected irony." Dave Segal of XLR8R called it "Sole's most accomplished opus yet." Meanwhile, Mike Schiller of PopMatters gave the album 3 stars out of 10, saying, "One or two songs in, the listener is convinced that Sole has something interesting to say; fifteen songs later, he's just an angry young man shouting about whatever."

== Track listing ==
All tracks are written by Sole, except "Banks of Marble" by Pedestrian.

No.	Title	Producer(s)	Length
1.	"Cheap Entertainment"	Odd Nosdam	3:38
2.	"Self Inflicted Wounds"	Alias	4:10
3.	"Predictions"	Controller 7	1:12
4.	"Sin Carne"	Odd Nosdam	3:10
5.	"Entalude"	Yasamin	1:26
6.	"Locust Farm"	Telephone Jim Jesus	1:48
7.	"Every Single One of Us"	Alias	4:09
8.	"A Typical"	Alias	1:27
9.	"Crisis"	Controller 7	2:41
10.	"Manifesto 232"	Odd Nosdam	3:34
11.	"Banks of Marble"	Odd Nosdam	3:03
12.	"Atheist Jihad"	Odd Nosdam	2:55
13.	"Dumb This Down"	Odd Nosdam	3:14
14.	"Imsotired"	Alias	4:20
15.	"On Martyrdom"	Tepr	5:24
16.	"Theme"	Matt	3:53
17.	"Drive By Detournment"	Tepr	4:34
Total length:			51:39

== Personnel ==
Credits adapted from liner notes.

- Sole – vocals, mixing (5, 15, 17)
- Jel – additional vocals (1)
- Pedestrian – additional vocals (1)
- Odd Nosdam – production (1, 4, 10–13), mixing (1, 4, 6, 10–13, 15, 17), additional production (7), additional mixing (7)
- Alias – production (2, 7, 8, 14), mixing (7, 14)
- Jeremy Goody – mixing (2, 3, 8, 9)
- Controller 7 – production (3, 9)
- Yasamin – production (5)
- Telephone Jim Jesus – production (6)
- Bleubird – vocals (12)
- Tepr – production (15, 17)
- Matt – production (16), mixing (16)
- George Horn – mastering
