= The Exile: The Flight of Osama bin Laden =

2017 historical book by Adrian Levy and Cathy Scott-Clark

The Exile: The Flight of Osama bin Laden is a historical book by Adrian Levy and Cathy Scott-Clark which was published on May 23, 2017 by Bloomsbury Publishing.

== Critical reception ==
David Pratt of Herald Scotland wrote "The Exile –The Flight of Osama bin Laden is the phenomenal degree of intimacy that the co-authors Cathy Scott-Clark and Adrian Levy have managed to achieve with bin Laden himself.", Jason Burke of The Observer wrote "Cathy Scott-Clark and Adrian Levy's gripping history of the terrorist network, from 2001 to the present, reveals a dark web of familial and political machinations", Indranil Banerjie of Deccan Chronicle wrote "The Exile is a sledgehammer of a book: it's a thriller, a historical record, a masterpiece of investigative journalism and above all a captivating inside story of this century's greatest villain, the Al Qaeda.", Steve Donoghue of The Christian Science Monitor wrote "Cathy Scott-Clark and Adrian Levy's work is a truly impressive feat of journalism and also an intensely gripping reading experience.", David Dutcher of Air University wrote "I highly recommend The Exile for readers seeking a behind-the-scenes look at OBL's flight from justice following the 9/11 attacks.".

The book has been also reviewed by Christina Lamb of The Sunday Times, Adrian Weale of Literary Review, Lawrence Freedman of Foreign Affairs, David Tonge of Prospect, Suhasini Haidar of The Hindu,
