= Plastique (album) =

Studio album by Sole and the Skyrider Band
- Released: October 13, 2009
- Genre: Hip-hop
- Length: 42:25
- Label: Fake Four Inc.
- Producer: Bud Berning; John Wagner

Sole and the Skyrider Band chronology
Sole and the Skyrider Band (2007)	Plastique (2009)	Hello Cruel World (2011)

Plastique is the second studio album by Sole and the Skyrider Band. It was released on Fake Four Inc. on October 13, 2009.

== Critical reception ==
Professional ratings
Review scores
Source	Rating
AllMusic	3/5 stars
Exclaim!	favorable
PopMatters	8/10 stars
Potholes in My Blog	3/5 stars
RapReviews.com	6/10

Rick Anderson of AllMusic gave the album 3 stars out of 5, writing, "This is not your typical hip-hop, that's for sure -- but most of it is well worth the effort required to absorb it." Andrew Dietzel of PopMatters gave the album 8 stars out of 10, stating that "The structures are distinctly hip-hop, but they are also carefully constructed against the grain of repetitive sampling and crunked-out keyboards, a quality becoming increasingly rare, even amongst independent artists." Thomas Quinlan of Exclaim! commented that Sole's "dense, sarcastic, stream-of-consciousness poetry offers more than enough opportunity for those looking for a challenge."

== Track listing ==
No.	Title	Length
1.	"Children of Privilege"	3:31
2.	"Battlefields" (featuring Markus Acher)	4:33
3.	"Longshots"	5:14
4.	"Nothing Pt. 2"	3:55
5.	"More"	4:25
6.	"Pissing in the Wind"	4:27
7.	"Bait"	4:59
8.	"Mr. Insurgent"	3:55
9.	"Black"	7:31
Total length:		42:25

== Personnel ==
Credits adapted from liner notes.

Sole and the Skyrider Band

- Tim Holland – vocals, lyrics
- Bud Berning – production
- William Ryan Fritch – instrumentation
- John Wagner – production, live drums

Additional musicians

- Markus Acher – vocals (2)

Technical personnel

- Doc Harrill – mixing, mastering
