= Selling Live Water =

Studio album by Sole
- Released: January 13, 2003
- Genre: Hip-hop
- Length: 54:53
- Label: Anticon
- Producers: Telephone Jim Jesus; Alias; Odd Nosdam; Jel

Sole chronology
Bottle of Humans (2000)	Selling Live Water (2003)	Live from Rome (2005)

Singles from Selling Live Water
- 1. "Salt on Everything" Released: 2002; 2. "Plutonium (Remix)" / "Selling Live Water (Dead Food Remix)" Released: 2003

Selling Live Water is a solo studio album by American hip-hop artist Sole. It was released on Anticon in 2003. It peaked at number 126 on the CMJ Radio 200 chart, as well as number 7 on CMJ's Hip-Hop chart.

== Production ==
Selling Live Water was produced by Telephone Jim Jesus, Alias, Odd Nosdam, and Jel. The album draws influence from Noam Chomsky and Howard Zinn. In an interview with Westword, Sole said, "Selling Live Water is an attempt at sizing up the world as I see it in a more complete manner than making vague self-absorbed rants like my last record, Bottle of Humans."

== Critical reception ==
Professional ratings
Aggregate scores
Source	Rating
Metacritic	77/100
Review scores
Source	Rating
AllMusic	2.5/5 stars
Billboard	favorable
Christgau's Consumer Guide	B
Dusted Magazine	favorable
Entertainment Weekly	B
Exclaim!	favorable
Pitchfork	7.3/10
RapReviews.com	6.5/10
Stylus Magazine	B−

At Metacritic, which assigns a weighted average score out of 100 to reviews from mainstream critics, the album received an average score of 77, based on 9 reviews, indicating "generally favorable reviews".

Chris Dahlen of Pitchfork gave the album a 7.3 out of 10, saying: "Whether you dig it all or prefer him in small doses, Sole has never sounded more keyed up, heady and on target than he does on Selling Live Water, and its wrap-up is almost anthemic." Ed Howard of Stylus Magazine gave the album a grade of B−, saying: "Fun, diverse, and complex, this record is yet another great addition to the increasingly varied Anticon aesthetic." He added: "Encompassing personal introspection, socio-political commentary, naked explorations of relationships, and obtuse poetry, Selling Live Water also represents a massive step forward in Sole's lyrical evolution."

== Track listing ==
All tracks are written by Sole, except "Slow, Cold Drops" by Pedestrian.

No.	Title	Producer(s)	Length
1.	"Da Baddest Poet"	Telephone Jim Jesus	4:23
2.	"Shoot the Messenger"	Alias	3:23
3.	"Salt on Everything"	Odd Nosdam	3:22
4.	"I Hope You Like My Stupid Painting"		0:31
5.	"Respect Pt. 3"	Jel	4:13
6.	"Tokyo"	Alias	3:49
7.	"Plutonium"	Alias	4:54
8.	"Sebago"	Jel	4:38
9.	"Slow, Cold Drops"	Alias	4:03
10.	"Pawn in the Game Pt. 1"	Alias	2:30
11.	"Pawn in the Game Pt. 2"	Alias	3:17
12.	"The Priziest Horse"	Alias	4:06
13.	"Teepee on a Highway Blues"	Alias	4:02
14.	"Selling Live Water"	Odd Nosdam	4:30
15.	"Ode to the War on Terrorism"	Telephone Jim Jesus	3:12
Total length:			54:53

== Personnel ==
Credits adapted from liner notes.

- Sole – vocals, entaludes
- Telephone Jim Jesus – production (1, 15)
- Alex Oropexa – mixing (1, 2, 4–13, 15), extra keyboards (7, 9)
- Xopher D – mixing (1, 2, 4–13, 15), mastering
- Alias – production (2, 6, 7, 9–13)
- Why? – keyboards (3, 14), vocal harmonies (14)
- Odd Nosdam – production (3, 14), mixing (3, 14)
- Jel – production (5, 8), cuts
