= Pedestrian (rapper) =

American rapper and writer

- Also known as: The Pedestrian; Evangelist J.B. Best; Cosmic Lovefuck; Whitefolks
- Born: James Brandon Best
- Origin: Los Angeles
- Genres: Alternative hip-hop, underground hip-hop
- Occupations: Rapper, preacher, writer
- Years active: 1998–present
- Label: Anticon
- Website: www.anticon.com

James Brandon Best, better known by his stage name Pedestrian, is a rapper and writer from Los Angeles. He is a co-founder of Anticon. He is also known as a preacher under the moniker Evangelist J.B. Best.

== History ==
In 1998, Pedestrian co-founded Anticon with other indie hip-hop artists. He came up with the name; it means "anti conformity" originally, but also means "ant icon."

He has written several articles about hip-hop for East Bay Express from 2003 to 2004.

After being featured on other Anticon co-founders' albums such as Them and Bottle of Humans, Pedestrian released his debut solo album Volume One: UnIndian Songs on the label in 2005. It was produced by Matt Chang, Jel, Why? and Alias. "The Toss & Turn" b/w "Arrest the President," a single from the album, includes the track "Resurrection Morning Sermon" performed by Evangelist J.B. Best.

Pedestrian toured across the United States and Europe with Sole, Dosh and Telephone Jim Jesus in promotion of the album.

He wrote an article about N.W.A for Xlr8r in 2008.

== Style ==
In a 2003 interview, Pedestrian talked about his influence and rapping style:

"I was mostly into fast rapping and freestyling, and I was really inspired too by a lot of vocalese-Annie Ross, Jon Hendricks, and Eddie Jefferson especially. Which is probably the apotheosis of voice-as-instrument. But the whole appeal of rap for me has always been its hyper-wordiness, and more than anything I want to communicate ideas."

== Discography ==
=== Studio albums ===
Pedestrian

- Volume One: UnIndian Songs (Anticon, 2005)
- UnIndian II (Black Box Tapes, 2017)

Object Beings (Pedestrian with Doseone & Why?)

- Object Beings (2001)

=== EPs, mixtapes, compilations ===
EPs

- We Ain't Fessin' (Anticon, 2002) (with Deep Puddle Dynamics)

Mixtapes

- Red Dawn: A Baybridge Epic (2001) (with Sole, as Da Babylonianz)

Compilations

- Songs of the Light Workers' Local #168 (2005)

=== Singles ===
- "The Toss & Turn" b/w "Arrest the President" (Anticon, 2004)

=== Guest appearances ===
- Sole – "Becoming Became Undone" from "Bottle of Humans" (1999)
- Sole – "Our Dirty Big Secret" from Bottle of Humans (2000)
- Themselves – "Lyrical Cougel" from Them (2000)
- Shape Shifters – "The Intellectual Holly Chessmen" "Joy 2 Da World" from Know Future (2000)
- DJ Krush – "Song for John Walker" from The Message at the Depth (2002)
- Alias – "The Physical Voice" from Muted (2003)
- Telephone Jim Jesus – "N=1 Trial" "Untitled Private Landscape" "A Blindness Falls" from A Point Too Far to Astronaut (2004)
- Telephone Jim Jesus – "A Mouth of Fingers" & "Dice Raw" from Anywhere Out of the Everything (2007)
- Themselves – "Back 2 Burn" from The Free Houdini (2009)
- Sole – "White Rage/Arizona Goddamn" from Nuclear Winter Volume 2: Death Panel (2011)
- Sole & DJ Pain 1 - "The Janitor's Son" from Death Drive (2014)

=== Tracks appear on ===
- "Holy Shit!" & "Bright Moments" on Music for the Advancement of Hip Hop (1999)
- "Dead Beats, Generation of" on Ropeladder 12 (2000)
- "Props 2000" on Strictly Indee (2l000)
- "Pedestrian for Vessel" on Giga Single (2001)
- "Primes" on Mush Filmstrip (2001)
- "The Toss & Turn" & "Jane 2: Electric Boogaloo" on Anticon Label Sampler: 1999-2004 (2004)

=== Writing credits ===
- Sole - "Slow, Cold Drops" from Selling Live Water (2003)
- Sole - "Banks of Marble" from Live from Rome (2005)
- Jel - "Soft Money, Dry Bones" from Soft Money (2006)
- Sole and the Skyrider Band - "Home Ain't Shit" from Hello Cruel World (2011)
- Sole - "Assad Is Dead" from A Ruthless Criticism of Everything Existing (2012)
