= Sole and the Skyrider Band =

American hip-hop group

- Genres: Alternative hip-hop
- Years active: 2006–present
- Labels: Anticon; Fake Four Inc. Equinox Records
- Members: Tim Holland; Bud Berning; John Wagner; William Ryan Fritch

Sole and the Skyrider Band is an alternative hip-hop quartet based in Denver, Colorado.

The band consists of rapper Tim Holland a.k.a. Sole, producer Bud Berning a.k.a. Skyrider, multi-instrumentalist William Ryan Fritch, and drummer John Wagner.

The band has released three albums on Anticon, Fake Four Inc and Equinox Records.

== History ==
In 2010, Sole and the Skyrider Band toured across the United States with Ceschi Ramos and Dark Time Sunshine.

URB premiered the video for Factor's remix of the song "Mr. Insurgent" from their second album, Plastique, on March 1, 2011.

Sole and the Skyrider Band released their third album, Hello Cruel World, on Fake Four Inc in 2011. The band toured across the United States in the year.

== Discography ==
Studio albums

- Sole and the Skyrider Band (2007)
- Plastique (2009)
- Hello Cruel World (2011)

Remix albums

- Sole and the Skyrider Band Remix LP (2009)

EPs

- Battlefields (2009)
- The Challenger EP (2011)

Singles

- "Hello Cruel World" (2011)
