= William Ryan Fritch =

American musician, composer and producer

William Ryan Fritch (also known under the moniker Vieo Abiungo) is an American musician, composer, and producer, currently residing in Oakland, California. He is a member of Sole and the Skyrider Band and has released several albums under his own name.

Fritch began his musical career in rural Florida. He self-released his first album, Plumed and Desiccated, in 2006; this album featured vocals, which Fritch would henceforth eschew until his 2014 release Leave Me Like You Found Me. After a show in Phoenix, Fritch was contacted by Lost Tribe Sound, a record label which went on to release several of his albums.

Under the alias Vieo Abiungo, he released three albums for Lost Tribe between 2010 and 2012. Also in 2010, he released Music for Honey and Bile for Asthmatic Kitty's Library Catalog series. In 2014, he started a subscription series with Lost Tribe, releasing three full-length albums and several EPs. These included Leave Me Like You Found Me and the Empty EP.

Fritch also plays with composer Jon Mueller in the group Death Blues.

== Discography ==
Albums as William Ryan Fritch

- Plumed and Desiccated (2006)
- Library Catalog Music Series, Vol. 7: Music for Honey and Bile (Asthmatic Kitty, 2010)
- Emptied Animal (2014)
- Leave Me Like You Found Me (2014)
- Her Warmth (2014)
- Revisionist (2015)
- Settled Scores: Music for Film Vol. I (2015)
- New Worlds for Old Wounds (2016)
- Clean War (2016)
- Her Warmth (2016)
- III Tides (2016)
- Gopro: Eagle Hunters in a New World (2017)
- The Sum of Its Parts (2017)
- The Old Believers (2017)
- Behind the Pale (2017)
- Deceptive Cadence: Music For Film, Vol. I & II (2019)
- The Letdown (2020)
- Built Upon a Fearful Void (2021)
- Polarity (2023)
- Cohesion (2023)
- Adhesion (2024)

EPs as William Ryan Fritch

- A Hound's Heart (2013)
- Heavy EP (2014)
- Empty EP (2014)

Albums as Vieo Abiungo

- Blood Memory (2010)
- And the World Is Still Yawning (2011)
- Thunder May Have Ruined The Moment (2012)
- The Dregs (2019)
- At Once, There Was No Horizon (2020)

Soundtracks

- Kaleidoscope (2012)
- The Waiting Room (2013)
- The Emptied Animal (2014)
- Artifishal (Original Score) (2019)
- Exit 12 (Original Motion Picture Soundtrack) (2019)
