= Sole (hip-hop artist) =

American hip-hop artist

- Also known as: Mansbestfriend; Blazefest
- Born: James Timothy Holland Jr. September 25, 1977 (age 48); Portland, Maine, US
- Origin: New York City, New York, United States
- Genres: Underground hip-hop, conscious hip-hop, political hip-hop, alternative hip-hop, experimental hip-hop
- Occupations: Rapper, producer
- Years active: 1992–present
- Labels: Anticon; Fake Four Inc; Mush Records; Morr Music; 6months; 45 Below; Black Canyon
- Website: www.soleone.org

James Timothy "Tim" Holland Jr. (born September 25, 1977), better known by his stage name Sole, is an American underground hip-hop artist from Portland, Maine. He is one of eight co-founders of the record label Anticon. He has been a member of the groups Northern Exposure, Live Poets, Deep Puddle Dynamics, So-Called Artists, Da Babylonianz, Sole and the Skyrider Band and Waco Boyz.

== Career ==
In 2000, Sole released his first official solo album Bottle of Humans on Anticon. As So-Called Artists, he released Paint by Number Songs with Alias and DJ Mayonnaise in 2001. Sole's second solo album Selling Live Water was released in 2003 and received positive reviews; Pitchfork Media gave it a 7.3, Metacritic gave it a score of 77 out of 100.

Later that year, he moved to Barcelona. Two years later, he released the third solo album Live from Rome in 2005. Soon after, he moved back to the United States, relocating to Flagstaff, Arizona.

In 2007, Sole released Sole and the Skyrider Band as Sole and the Skyrider Band. Its second album Plastique was released in 2009. In 2010, Sole left Anticon, citing a desire to further experiment with his music, independently of the collective, and also due to his belief that the label developed away from what he initially intended it to be.

== Personal life ==
Sole is based in Brunswick, Maine. He married Yasamin Al-Hussaini on January 1, 2004, and her name is referenced occasionally in his lyrics. While living in Denver, Sole was active in the local outpost of the Occupy Wall Street political movement, various anarchist projects and hosts a podcast about revolutionary politics and radical philosophy called "The Solecast." He is an anarchist.

== Selected discography ==
Sole

- Bottle of Humans (Anticon, 2000)
- uck rt (2001)
- Selling Live Water (Anticon, 2003)
- Mansbestfriend Pt. 2: No Thanks (2003)
- Live from Rome (Anticon, 2005)
- Mansbestfriend Pt. 3: Myownworstenemy (2005)
- Poly.Sci.187 (Anticon, 2007)
- Desert Eagle (2008)
- A Ruthless Criticism of Everything Existing (Black Canyon, 2012)
- No Wising Up No Settling Down (Black Canyon, 2013)
- Crimes Against Totality (Black Canyon, 2013)
- Mansbestfriend 7 (Black Box Tapes, 2015)
- Let Them Eat Sand (Black Box Tapes, 2018)
- Destituent (Black Box Tapes, 2019)
- MBFX (Black Box Tapes, 2021)

Sole & DJ Pain 1

- Death Drive (Black Canyon, 2014)
- Nihilismo (Black Box Tapes, 2016)
- No God nor Country (Black Box Tapes, 2019)
- Post American Studies (eMERGENCY hEARTS, 2022)

Sole and the Skyrider Band

- Sole and the Skyrider Band (Anticon, 2007)
- Plastique (Fake Four Inc., 2009)
- Hello Cruel World (Fake Four Inc., 2011)

Whitenoise (Sole with Yasamin Holland)

- No More Dystopias (Black Canyon, 2013)
- Ruins (Black Box Tapes, 2015)

Other collaborations

- What's It All About (45 Below, 1996) (with Moodswing9, as Live Poets)
- The Taste of Rain... Why Kneel? (Anticon, 1999) (with Alias, Doseone & Slug, as Deep Puddle Dynamics)
- Red Dawn: A Baybridge Epic (2001) (with Pedestrian, as Da Babylonianz)
- Paint by Number Songs (Mush, 2001) (with Alias & DJ Mayonnaise, as So-Called Artists)
