= Takako Konishi =

Takako Konishi may refer to:

- Takako Konishi (office worker) (1973?-2001), Japanese woman who allegedly died while hunting for the fictional treasure from the film Fargo
- Takako Konishi (synchronized swimmer) (born 1986), Japanese synchronized swimmer
