= 30th Independent Spirit Awards =

US film awards ceremony in 2015

- Awarded for: Best in independent film
- Date: February 21, 2015
- Site: Santa Monica Pier; Santa Monica, California, U.S.
- Hosted by: Fred Armisen; Kristen Bell

Highlights
- Best Feature: Birdman
- Most awards: Birdman (3)
- Most nominations: Birdman (6)

Television coverage
- Channel: IFC

The 30th Film Independent Spirit Awards, honoring the best independent films of 2014, were presented by Film Independent on February 21, 2015. The nominations were announced on November 25, 2014. The ceremony was hosted by Fred Armisen and Kristen Bell, and aired live for the first time on IFC.

== Winners and nominees ==
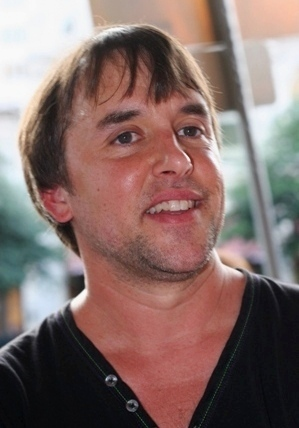
Richard Linklater, Best Director winner

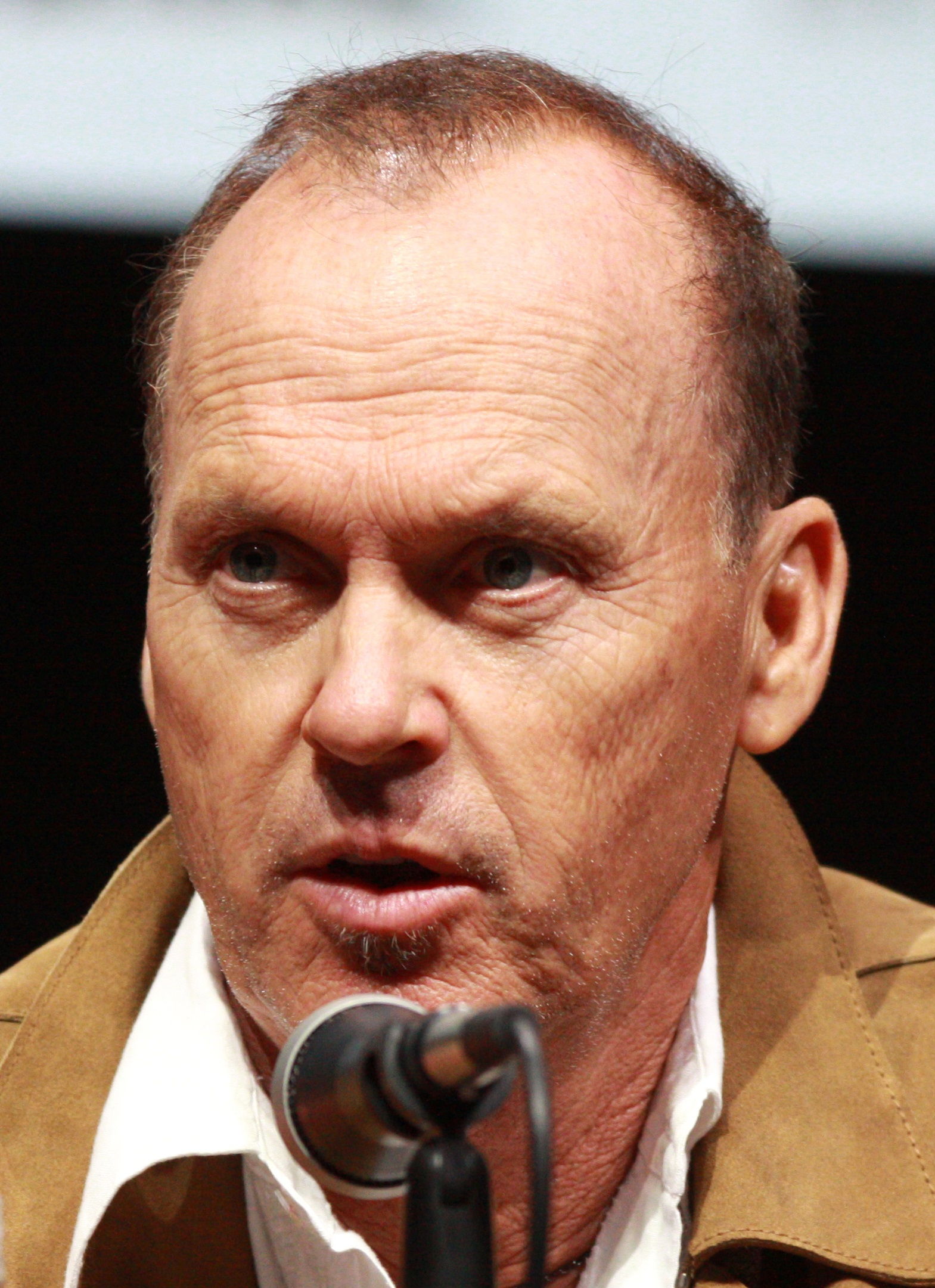
Michael Keaton, Best Male Lead winner

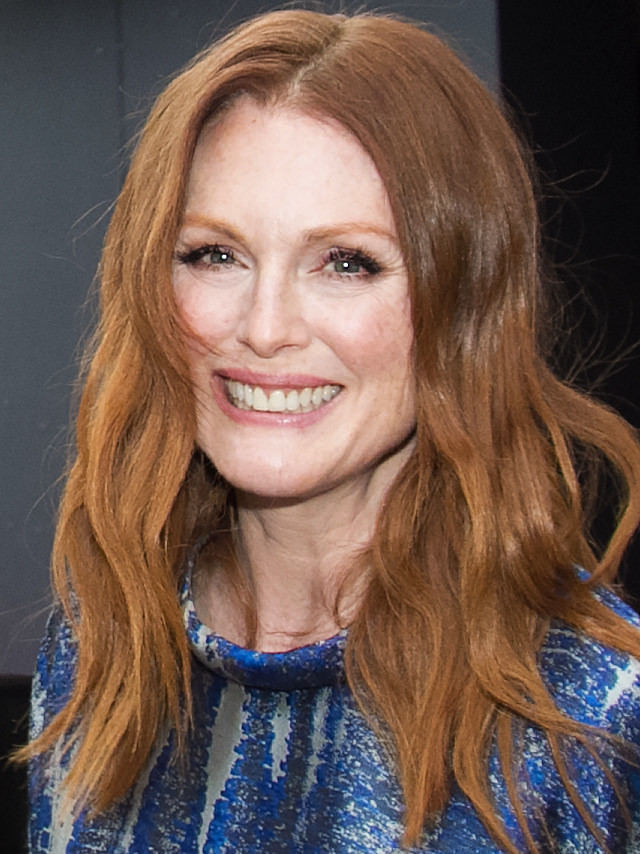
Julianne Moore, Best Female Lead winner

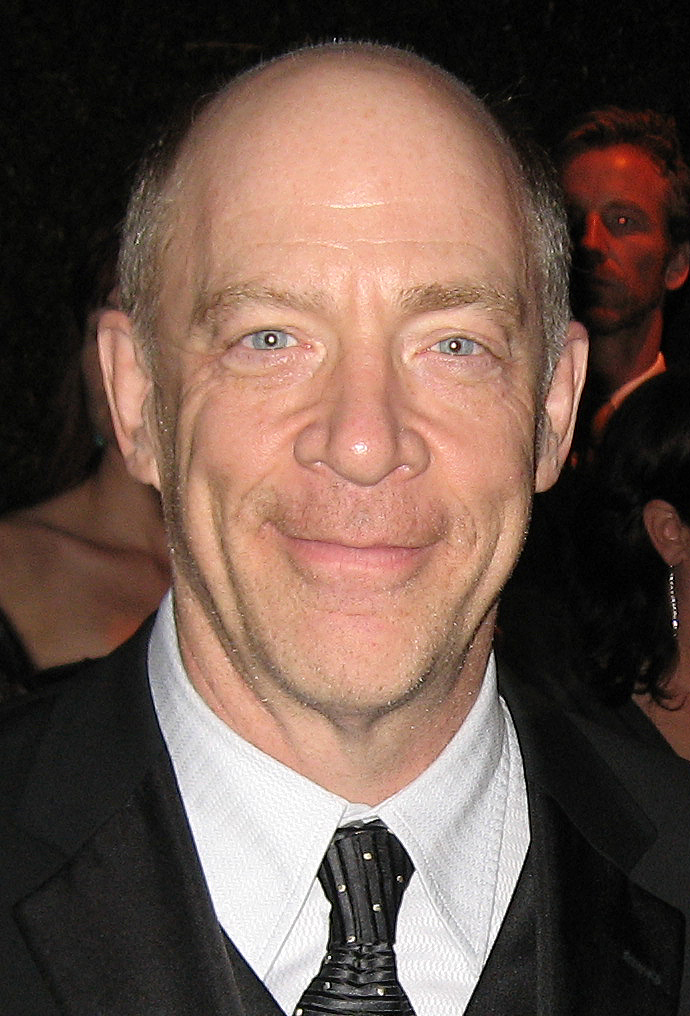
J. K. Simmons, Best Supporting Male winner

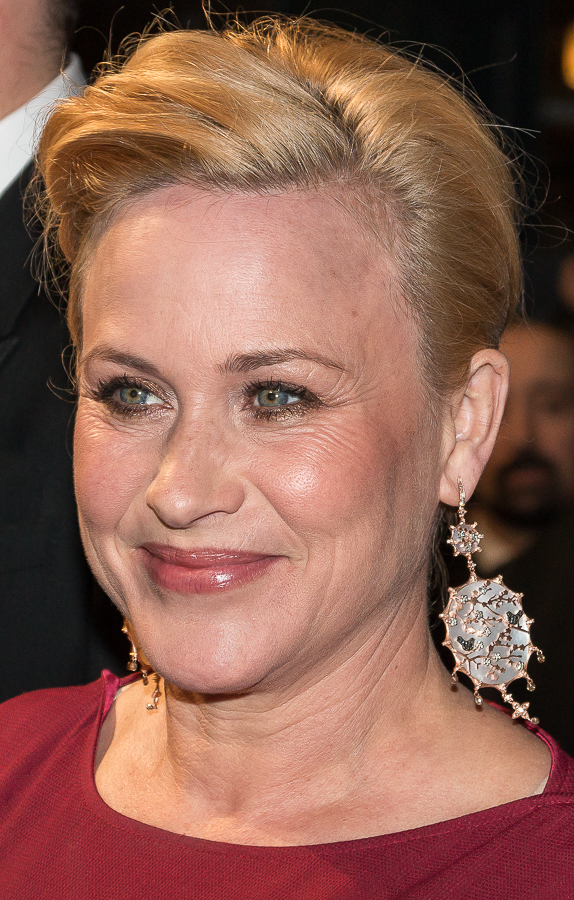
Patricia Arquette, Best Supporting Female winner

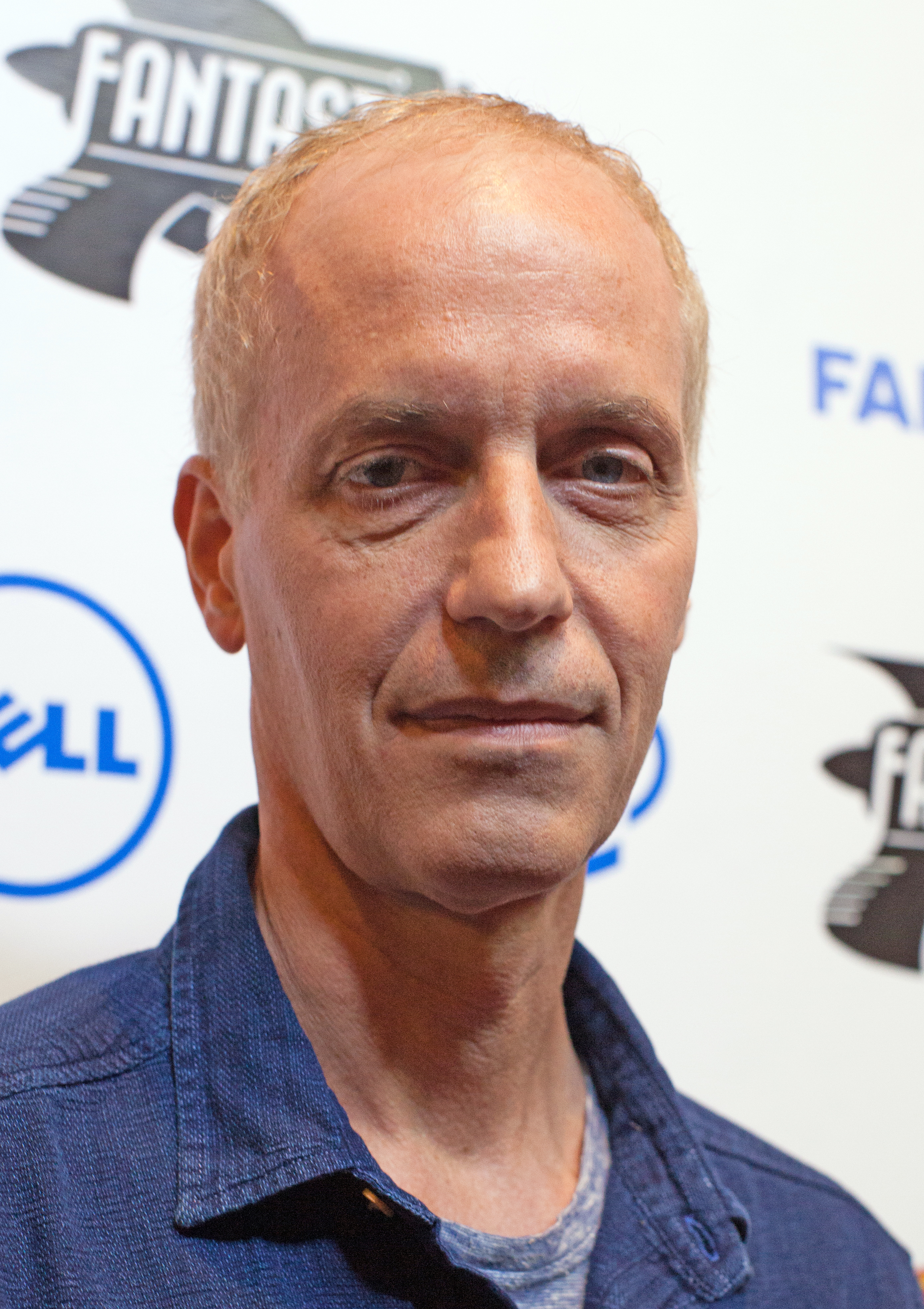
Dan Gilroy, Best Screenplay winner

| Best Feature | Best Director |
|---|---|
| Birdman: Boyhood; Love Is Strange; Selma; Whiplash | Richard Linklater – Boyhood: Damien Chazelle – Whiplash; Ava DuVernay – Selma; Alejandro G. Iñárritu – Birdman; David Zellner – Kumiko, the Treasure Hunter |
| Best Male Lead | Best Female Lead |
| Michael Keaton – Birdman as Riggan Thomson: André 3000 – Jimi: All Is by My Side as Jimi Hendrix; Jake Gyllenhaal – Nightcrawler as Louis "Lou" Bloom; John Lithgow – Love Is Strange as Ben Hull; David Oyelowo – Selma as Martin Luther King Jr. | Julianne Moore – Still Alice as Dr. Alice Howland: Marion Cotillard – The Immigrant as Ewa Cybulska; Rinko Kikuchi – Kumiko, the Treasure Hunter as Kumiko; Jenny Slate – Obvious Child as Donna Stern; Tilda Swinton – Only Lovers Left Alive as Eve |
| Best Supporting Male | Best Supporting Female |
| J. K. Simmons – Whiplash as Terence Fletcher: Riz Ahmed – Nightcrawler as Rick; Ethan Hawke – Boyhood as Mason Evans Sr.; Alfred Molina – Love Is Strange as George Garea; Edward Norton – Birdman as Mike Shiner | Patricia Arquette – Boyhood as Olivia Evans: Jessica Chastain – A Most Violent Year as Anna Morales; Carmen Ejogo – Selma as Coretta Scott King; Andrea Suarez Paz – Stand Clear of the Closing Doors as Mariana; Emma Stone – Birdman as Sam Thomson |
| Best Screenplay | Best First Screenplay |
| Dan Gilroy – Nightcrawler: Scott Alexander and Larry Karaszewski – Big Eyes; J. C. Chandor – A Most Violent Year; Jim Jarmusch – Only Lovers Left Alive; Ira Sachs and Mauricio Zacharias – Love Is Strange | Justin Simien – Dear White People: Desiree Akhavan – Appropriate Behavior; Sara Colangelo – Little Accidents; Justin Lader – The One I Love; Anja Marquardt – She's Lost Control |
| Best First Feature | Best Documentary Feature |
| Nightcrawler: Dear White People; A Girl Walks Home Alone at Night; Obvious Child; She's Lost Control | Citizenfour – Laura Poitras: 20,000 Days on Earth – Iain Forsyth and Jane Pollard; The Salt of the Earth – Juliano Ribeiro Salgado and Wim Wenders; Stray Dog – Debra Granik; Virunga – Orlando von Einsiedel |
| Best Cinematography | Best Editing |
| Emmanuel Lubezki – Birdman: Darius Khondji – The Immigrant; Sean Porter – It Felt Like Love; Lyle Vincent – A Girl Walks Home Alone at Night; Bradford Young – Selma | Tom Cross – Whiplash: Sandra Adair – Boyhood; John Gilroy – Nightcrawler; Ron Patane – A Most Violent Year; Adam Wingard – The Guest |
Best International Film
Ida (Denmark / France / Poland / United Kingdom) – Paweł Pawlikowski: Force Majeure (France / Norway / Sweden) – Ruben Östlund; Leviathan (Russia) – Andrey Zvyagintsev; Mommy (Canada) – Xavier Dolan; Norte, the End of History (Philippines) – Lav Diaz; Under the Skin (Switzerland / United Kingdom) – Jonathan Glazer

=== Films with multiple nominations and awards ===
Films that received multiple nominations
| Nominations | Film |
|---|---|
| 6 | Birdman |
| 5 | Boyhood |
| 5 | Nightcrawler |
| 5 | Selma |
| 4 | Love Is Strange |
| 4 | Whiplash |
| 3 | A Most Violent Year |
| 2 | A Girl Walks Home Alone at Night |
| 2 | The Immigrant |
| 2 | Kumiko, the Treasure Hunter |
| 2 | Obvious Child |
| 2 | Only Lovers Left Alive |
| 2 | She's Lost Control |

Films that won multiple awards
| Awards | Film |
|---|---|
| 3 | Birdman |
| 2 | Boyhood |
| 2 | Nightcrawler |
| 2 | Whiplash |

== Special awards ==
=== John Cassavetes Award ===
Land Ho!

- Blue Ruin
- It Felt Like Love
- Man From Reno
- Test

=== Robert Altman Award ===
(The award is given to its film director, casting director, and ensemble cast)

- Inherent Vice – Paul Thomas Anderson, Cassandra Kulukundis, Josh Brolin, Hong Chau, Benicio del Toro, Martin Donovan, Jena Malone, Joanna Newsom, Joaquin Phoenix, Sasha Pieterse, Eric Roberts, Maya Rudolph, Martin Short, Serena Scott Thomas, Katherine Waterston, Michael Kenneth Williams, Owen Wilson, and Reese Witherspoon

=== Kiehl's Someone to Watch Award ===
Recognizes a talented filmmaker of singular vision who has not yet received appropriate recognition. The award includes a $25,000 unrestricted grant funded by Kiehl's since 1851.

Rania Attieh and Daniel Garcia – H.

- Ana Lily Amirpour – A Girl Walks Home Alone at Night
- Chris Eska – The Retrieval

=== Piaget Producers Award ===
Honors emerging producers who, despite highly limited resources, demonstrate the creativity, tenacity and vision required to produce quality, independent films. The award includes a $25,000 unrestricted grant funded by Piaget.

Chris Ohlson

- Chad Burris
- Elisabeth Holm

=== Truer than Fiction Award ===
Presented to an emerging director of non-fiction features who has not yet received significant recognition. The award includes a $25,000 unrestricted grant funded by LensCrafters.

Dan Krauss – The Kill Team

- Sara Dosa – The Last Season
- Darius Clark Monroe – Evolution of a Criminal
- Amanda Rose Wilder – Approaching the Elephant

=== Special Distinction Award ===
(The award is given to its film director, producers, and ensemble cast for its uniqueness of "vision, honesty of direction and screenwriting, superb acting and achievement on every level of filmmaking")

- Foxcatcher – Bennett Miller (director/producer), E. Max Frye (writer), Dan Futterman (writer), Anthony Bregman (producer), Megan Ellison (producer), Jon Kilik (producer), Steve Carell (cast), Mark Ruffalo (cast), and Channing Tatum (cast)
