= Independent Spirit Award for Best Female Lead =

Acting award for independent film

- Presented by: Independent Spirit Awards
- First award: Geraldine Page; The Trip to Bountiful (1986)
- Final award: Taylour Paige; Zola (2021)
- Website: spiritawards.com

The Independent Spirit Award for Best Female Lead was one of the annual Independent Spirit Awards to honor an actress who has delivered an outstanding lead performance in an independent film. It was first presented in 1985 with Geraldine Page being the first recipient of the award for her role as Carrie Watts in The Trip to Bountiful. It was last presented in 2022 with Taylour Paige being the final recipient of the award for her role in Zola.

In 2022, it was announced that the four acting categories would be retired and replaced with two gender neutral categories, with both Best Male Lead and Best Female Lead merging into the Best Lead Performance category.

With two wins, Frances McDormand and Julianne Moore are the most awarded women in this category, while with 4 nominations Michelle Williams is the most nominated female in this category.

== Winners and nominees ==
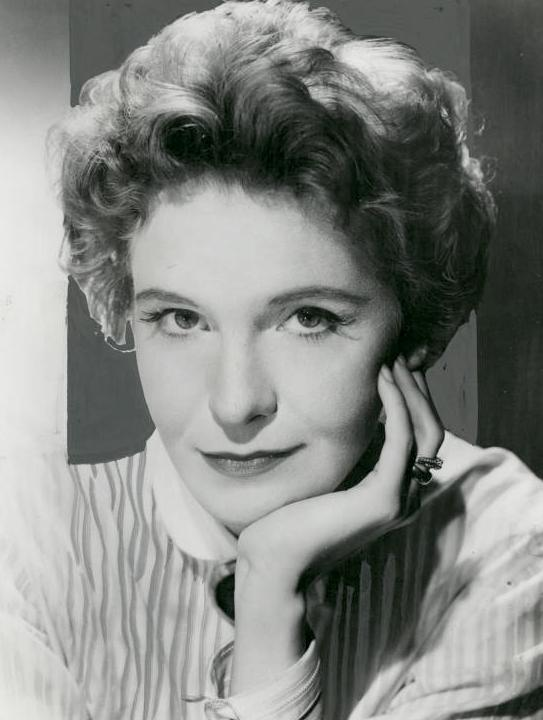
Geraldine Page won for The Trip to Bountiful.

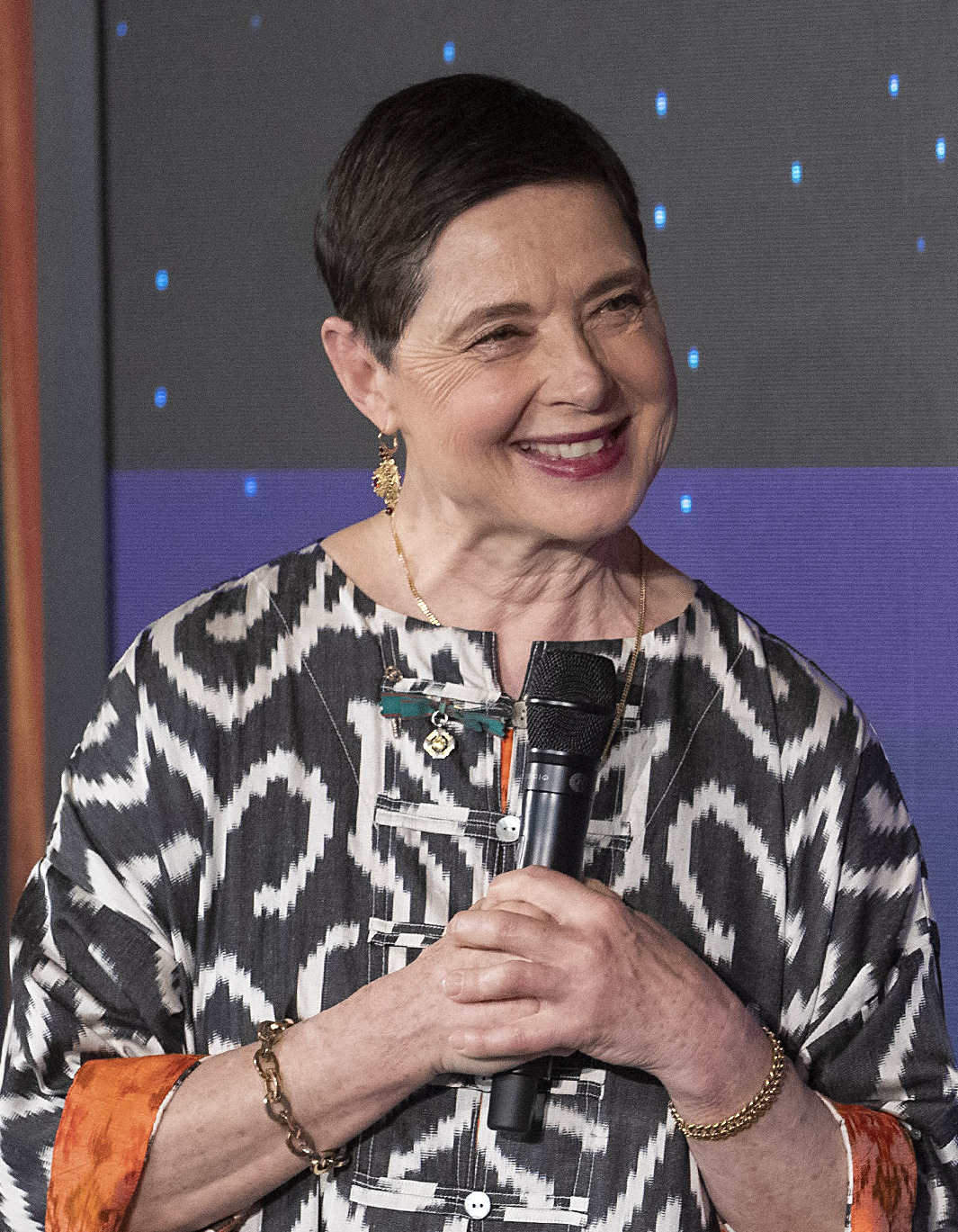
Isabella Rossellini won for Blue Velvet.

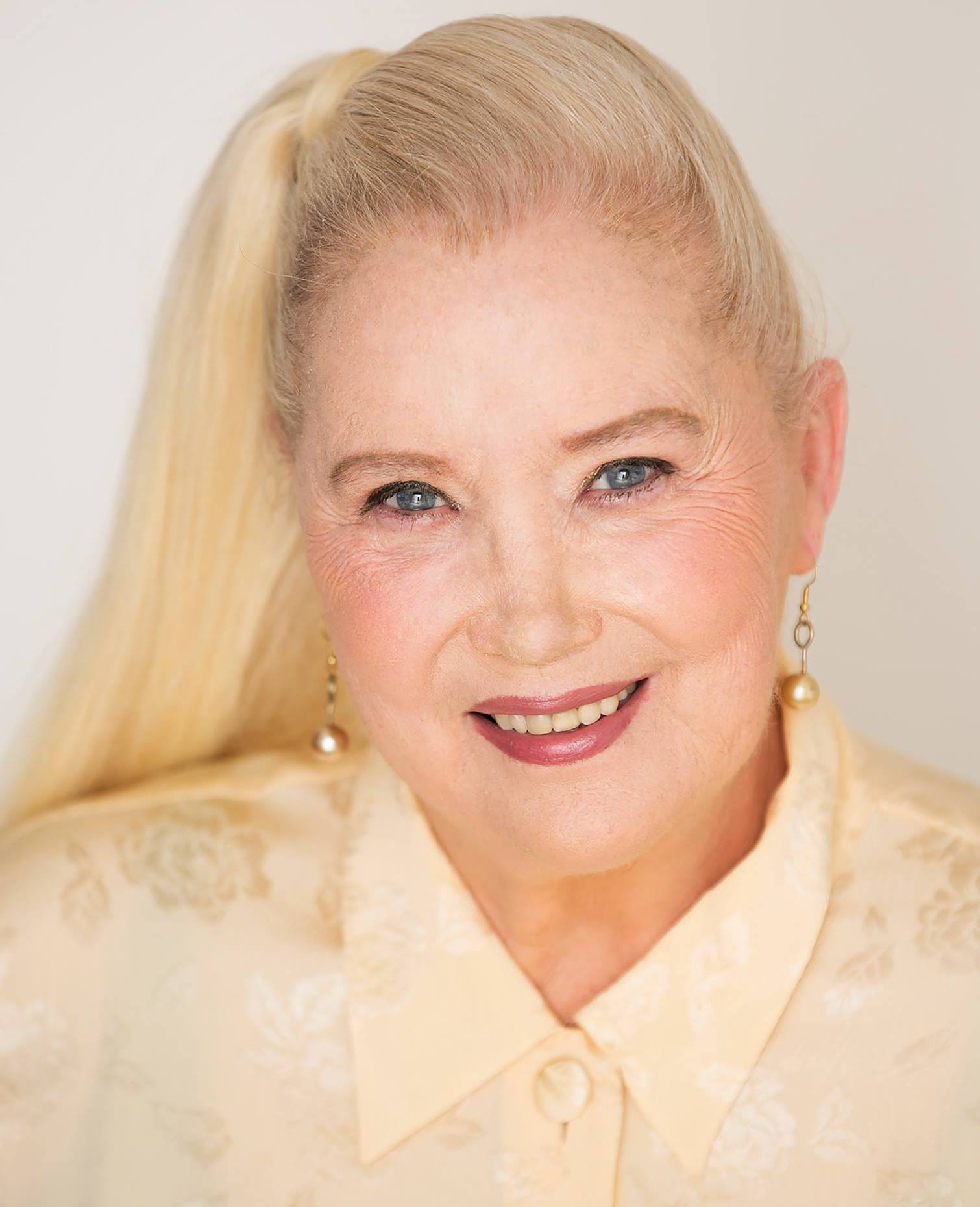
Sally Kirkland won for Anna.

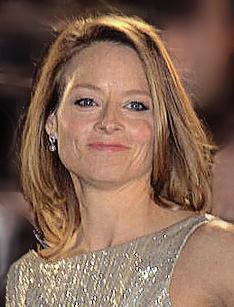
Jodie Foster won for Five Corners.

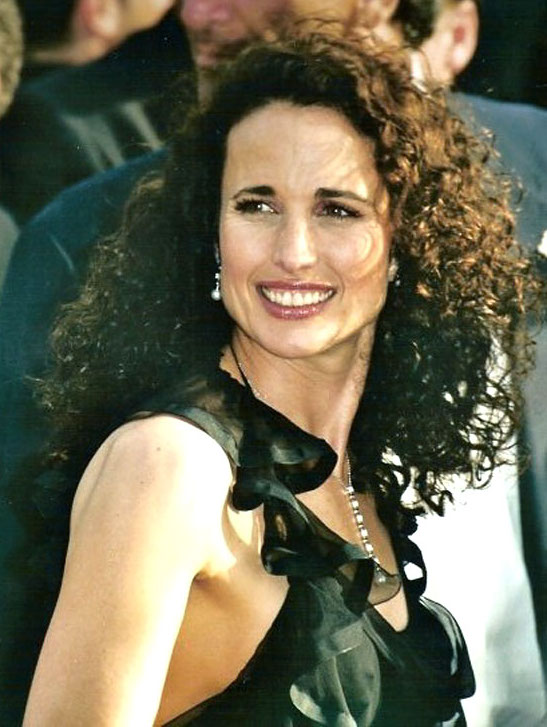
Andie MacDowell won for Sex, Lies, and Videotape.

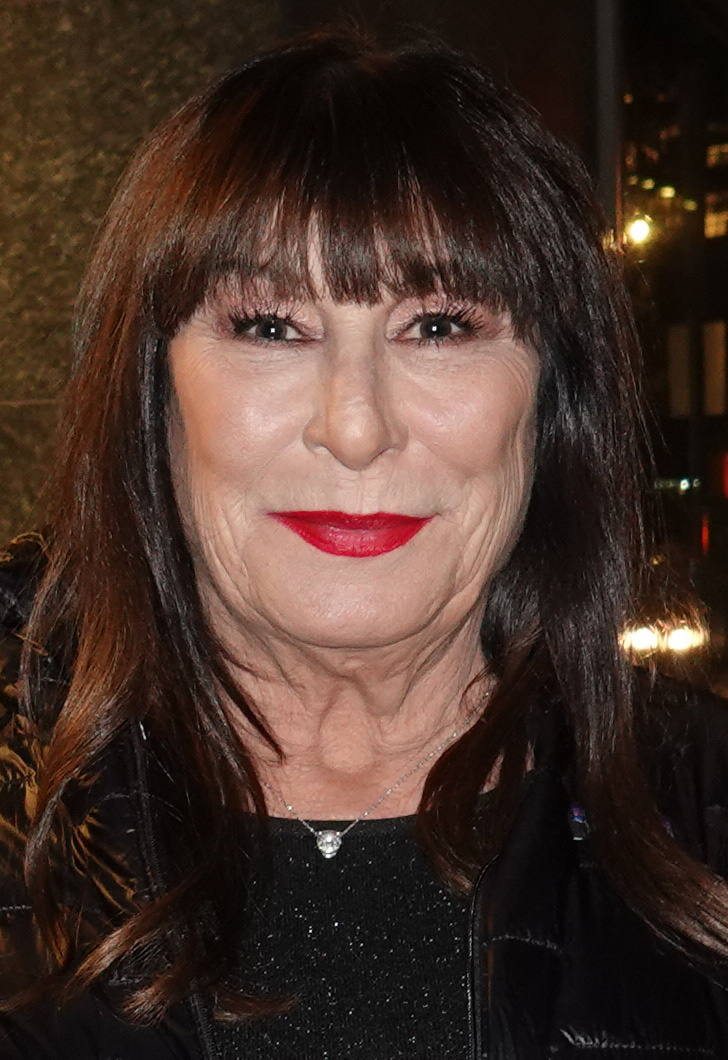
Anjelica Huston won for The Grifters.

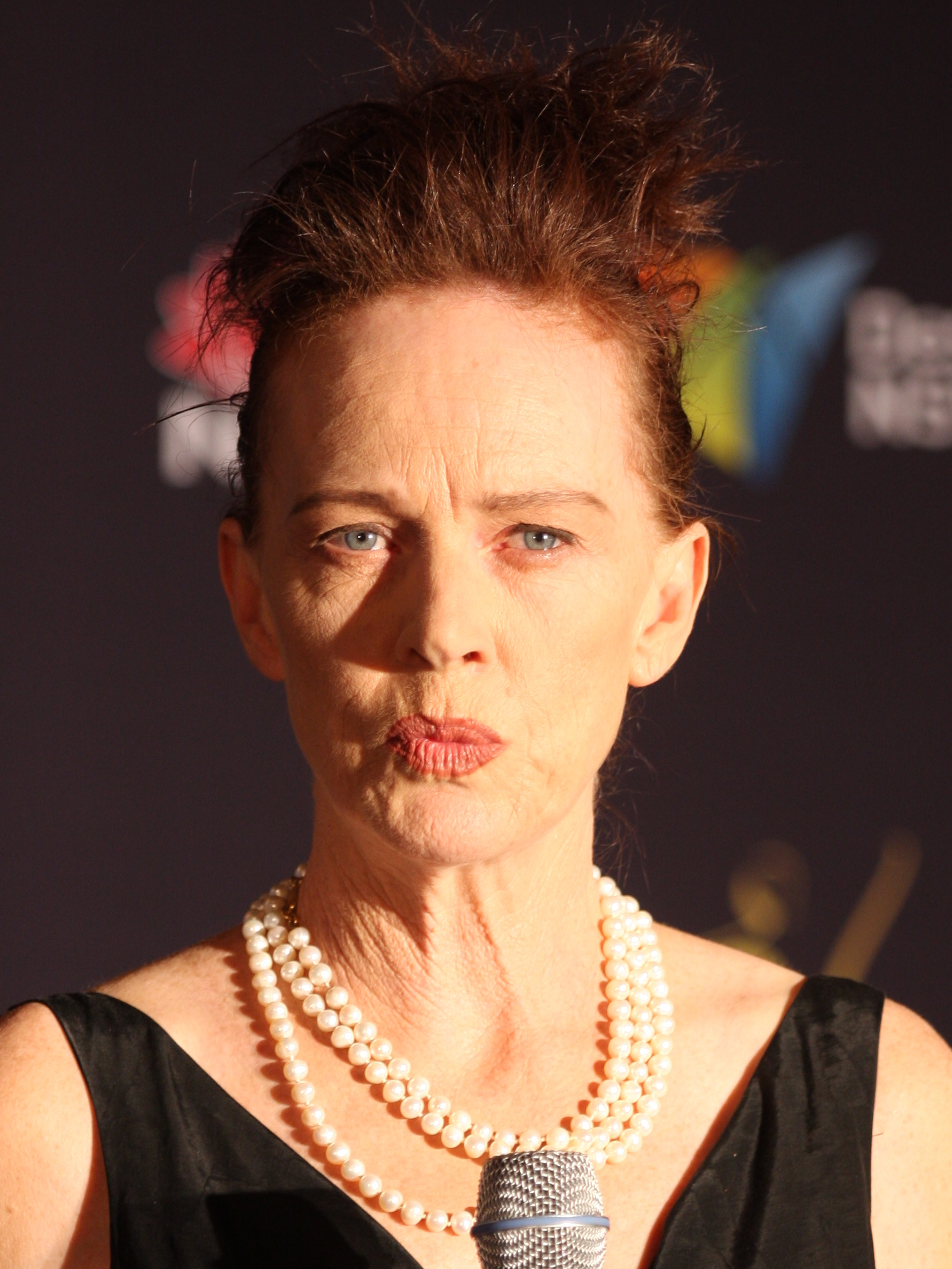
Judy Davis won for Impromptu.

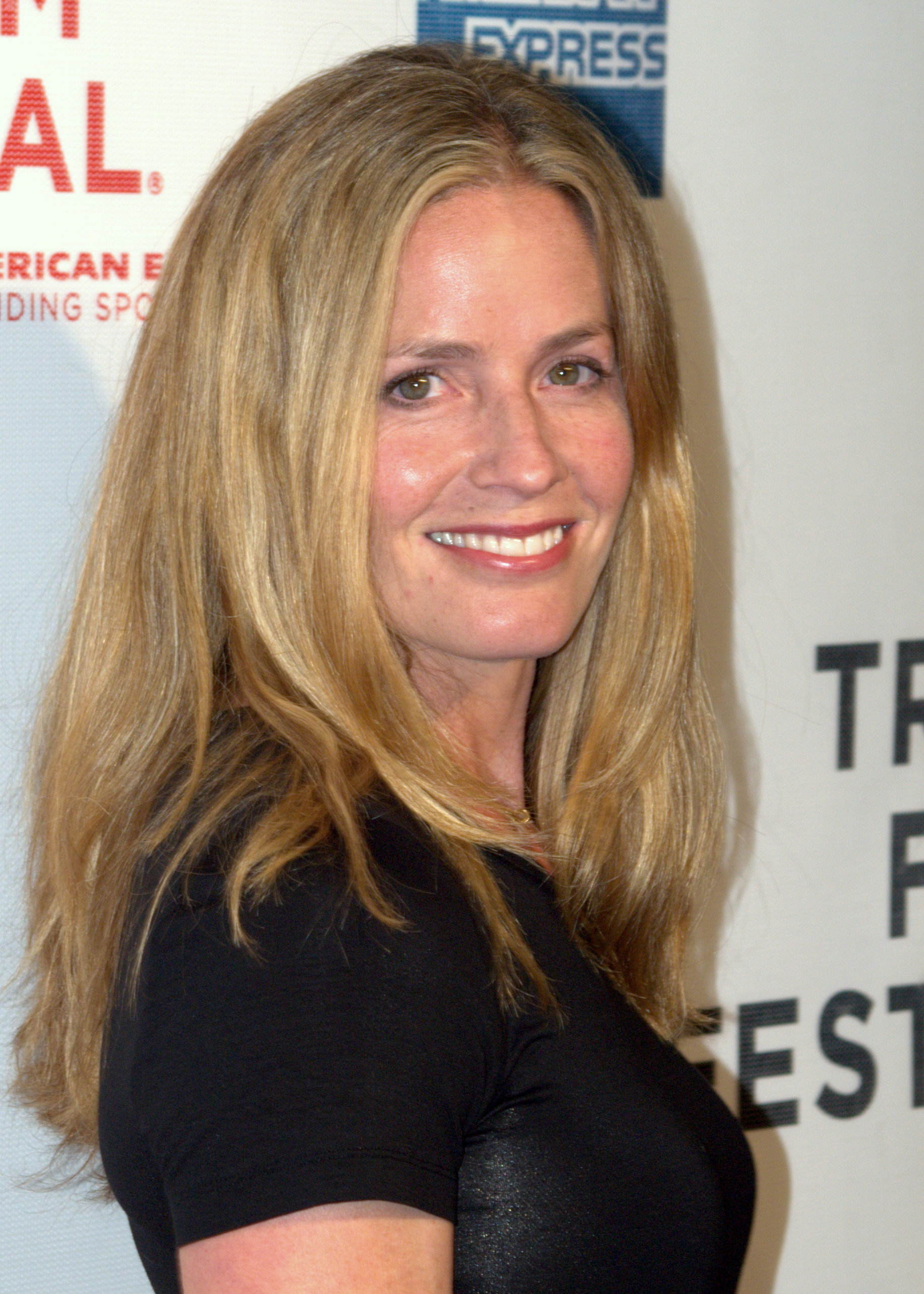
Elisabeth Shue won for Leaving Las Vegas.

Frances McDormand won twice: Fargo (1996) and Three Billboards Outside Ebbing, Missouri (2017).

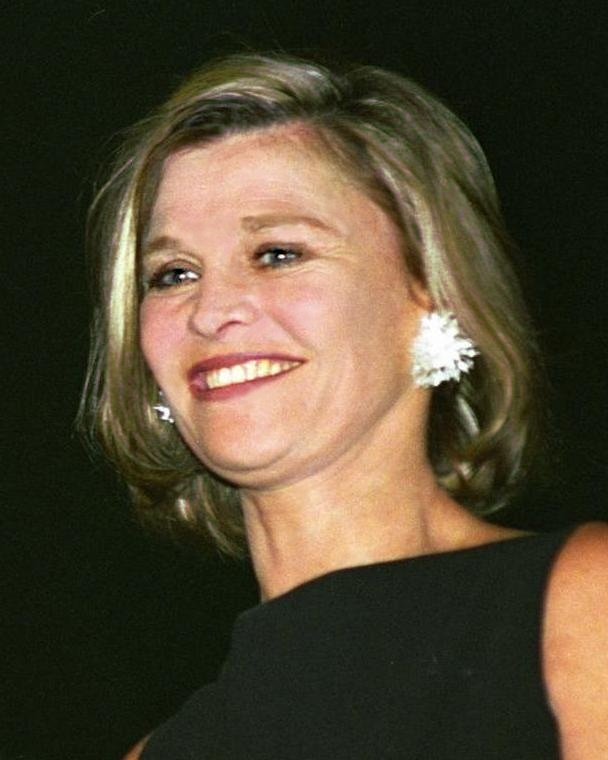
Julie Christie won for Afterglow.

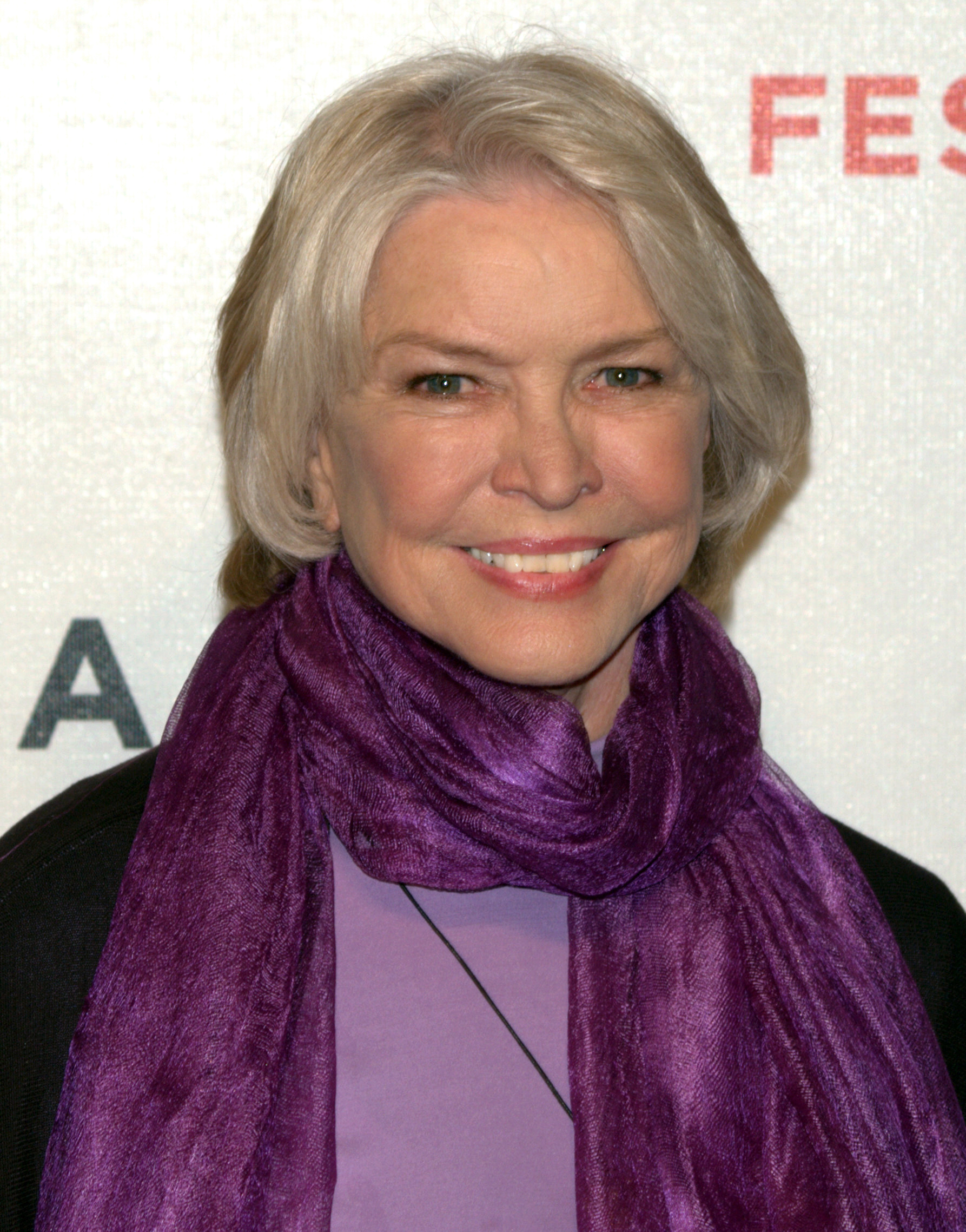
Ellen Burstyn won for Requiem for a Dream.

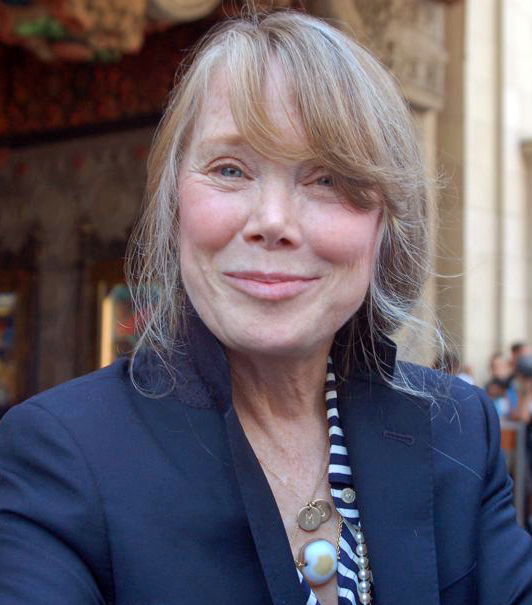
Sissy Spacek won for In the Bedroom.

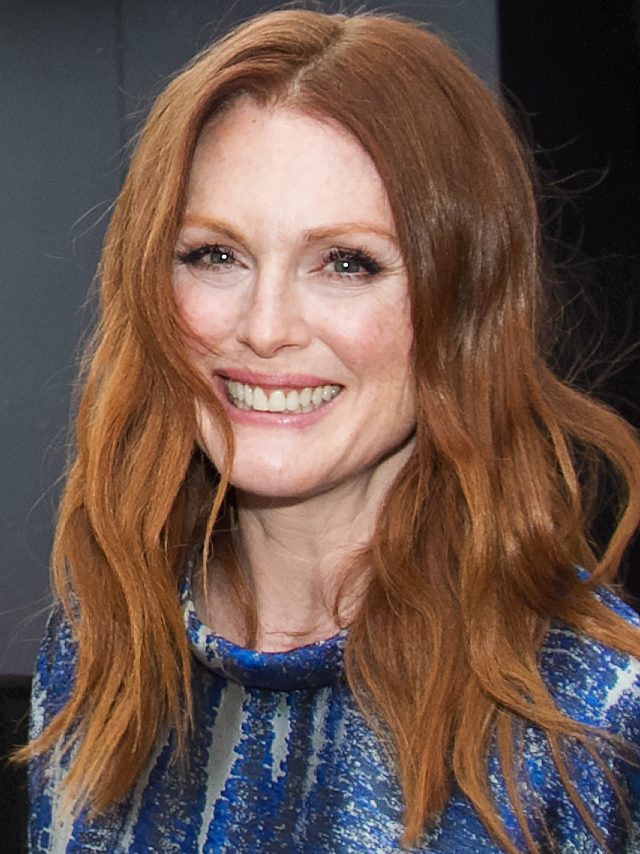
Julianne Moore has twice: Far from Heaven (2002) and Still Alice (2014).

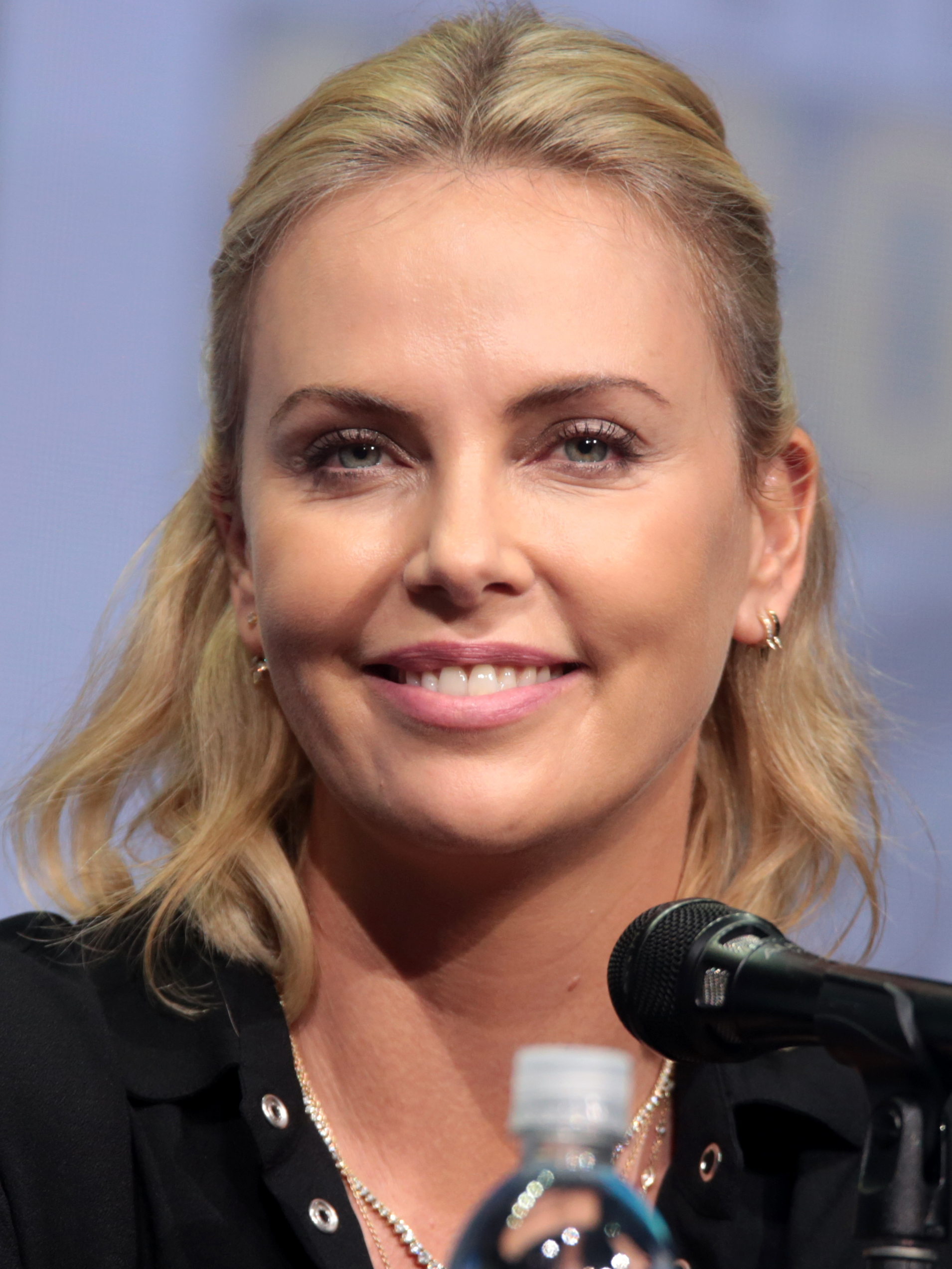
Charlize Theron won for Monster.

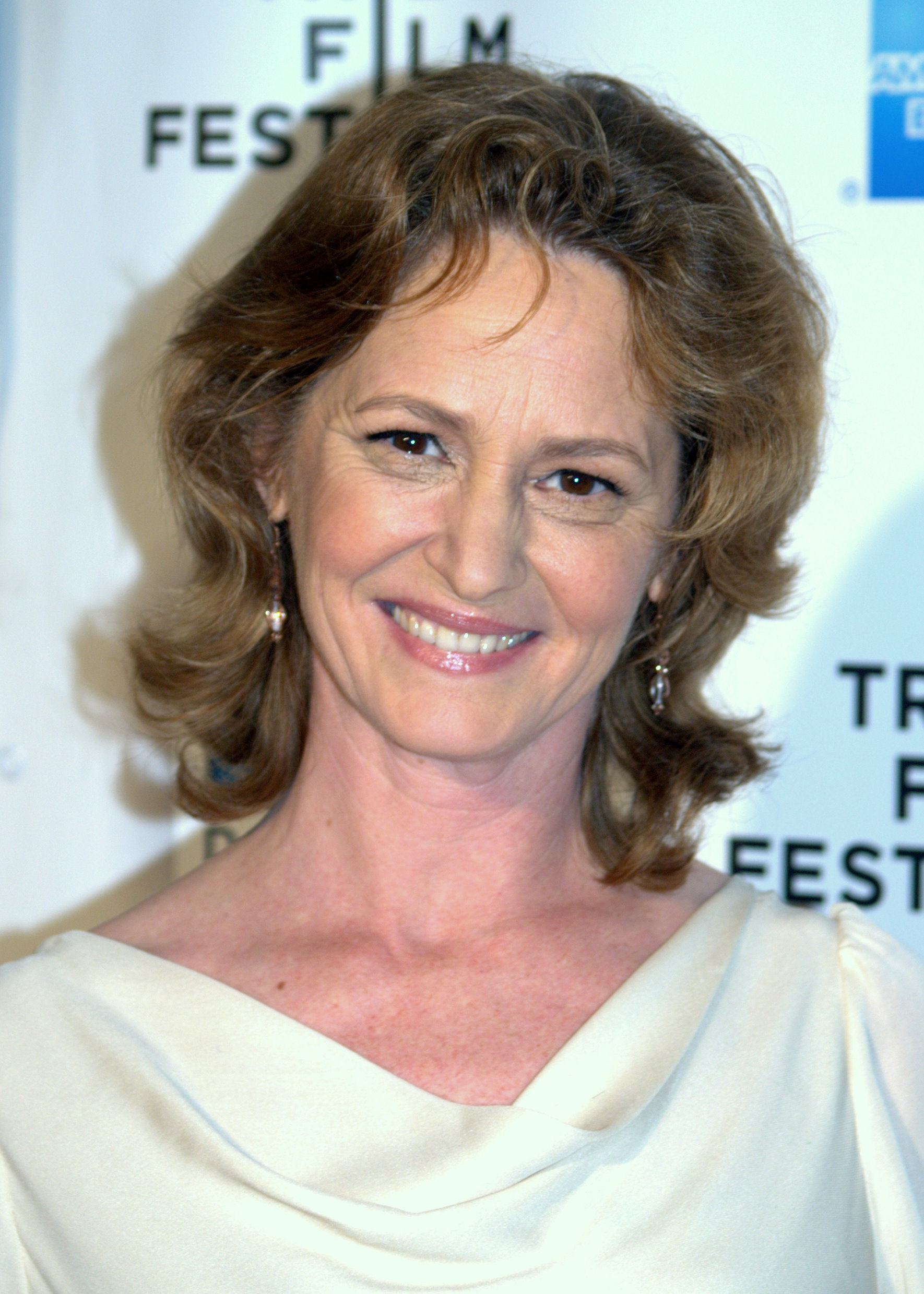
Melissa Leo won for Frozen River.

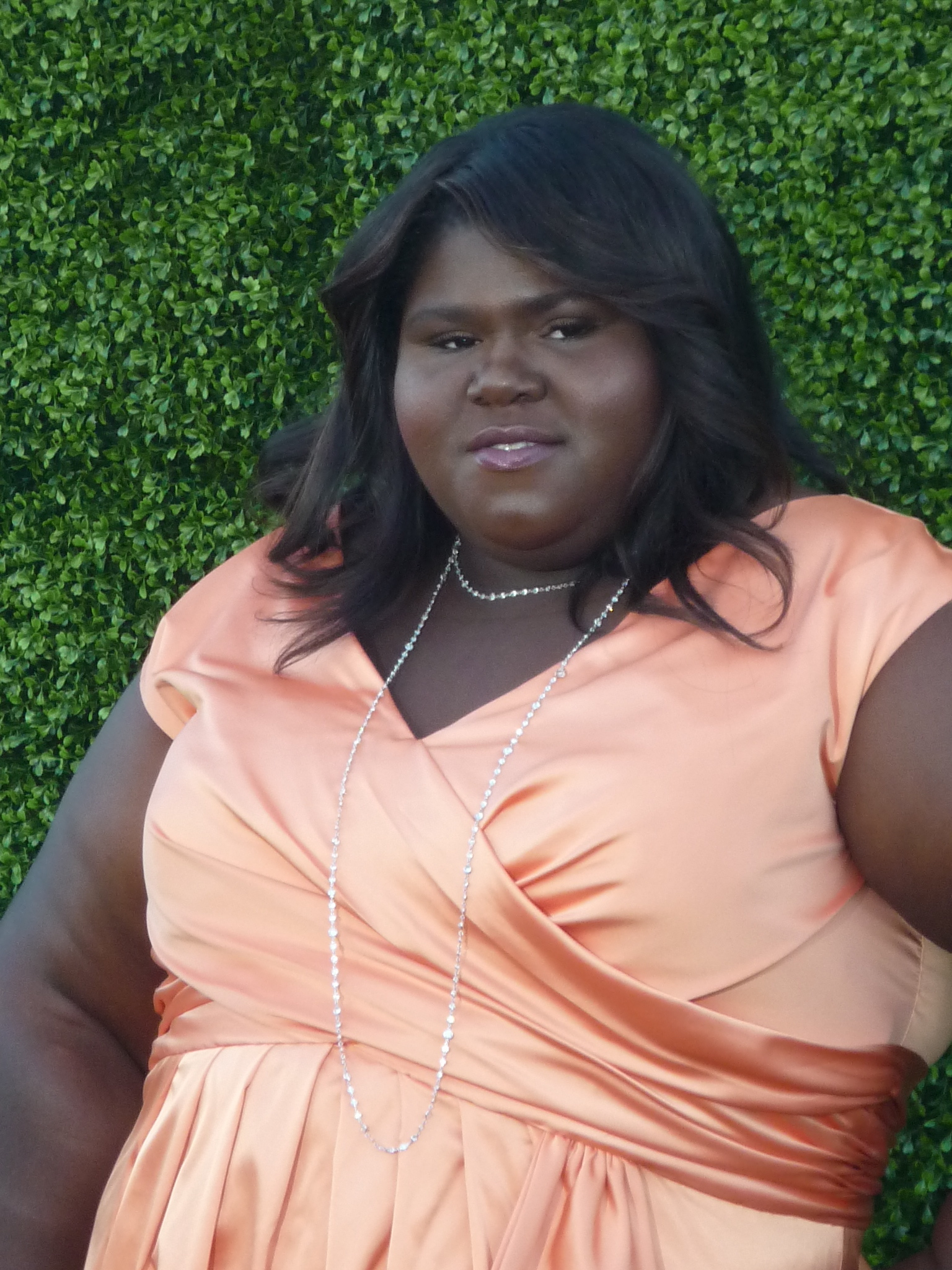
Gabourey Sidibe won for Precious.

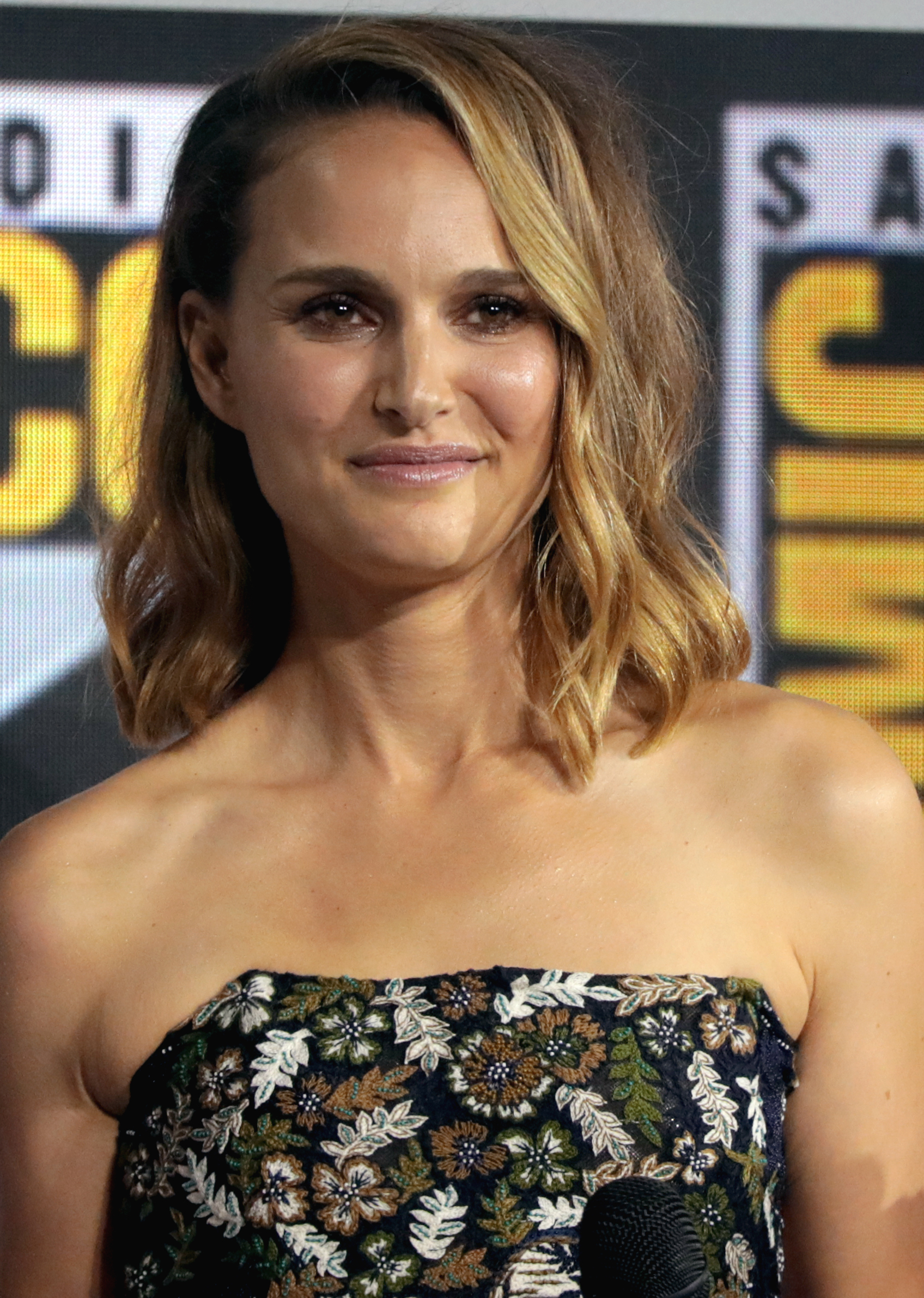
Natalie Portman won for Black Swan.

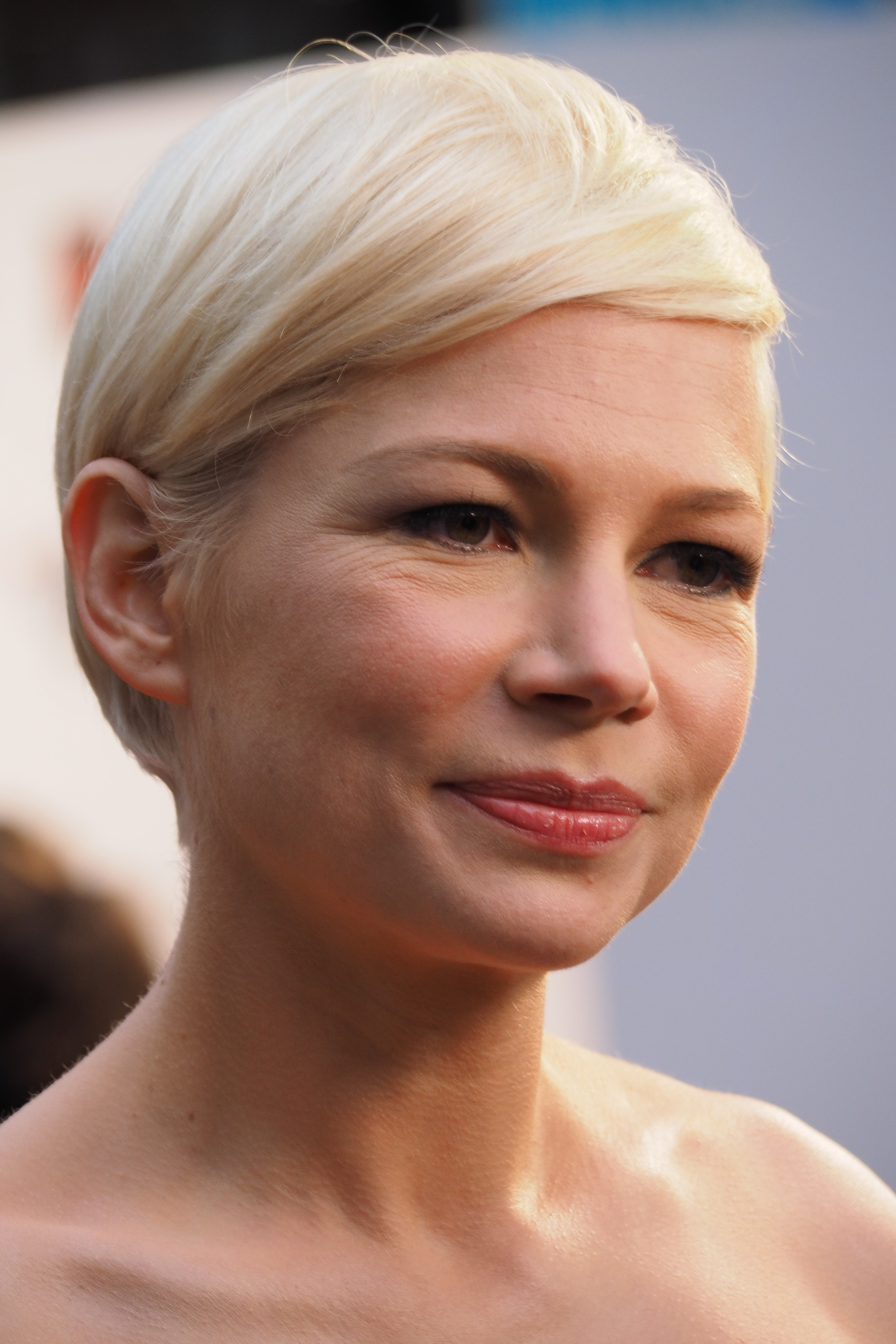
Michelle Williams won for My Week with Marilyn.

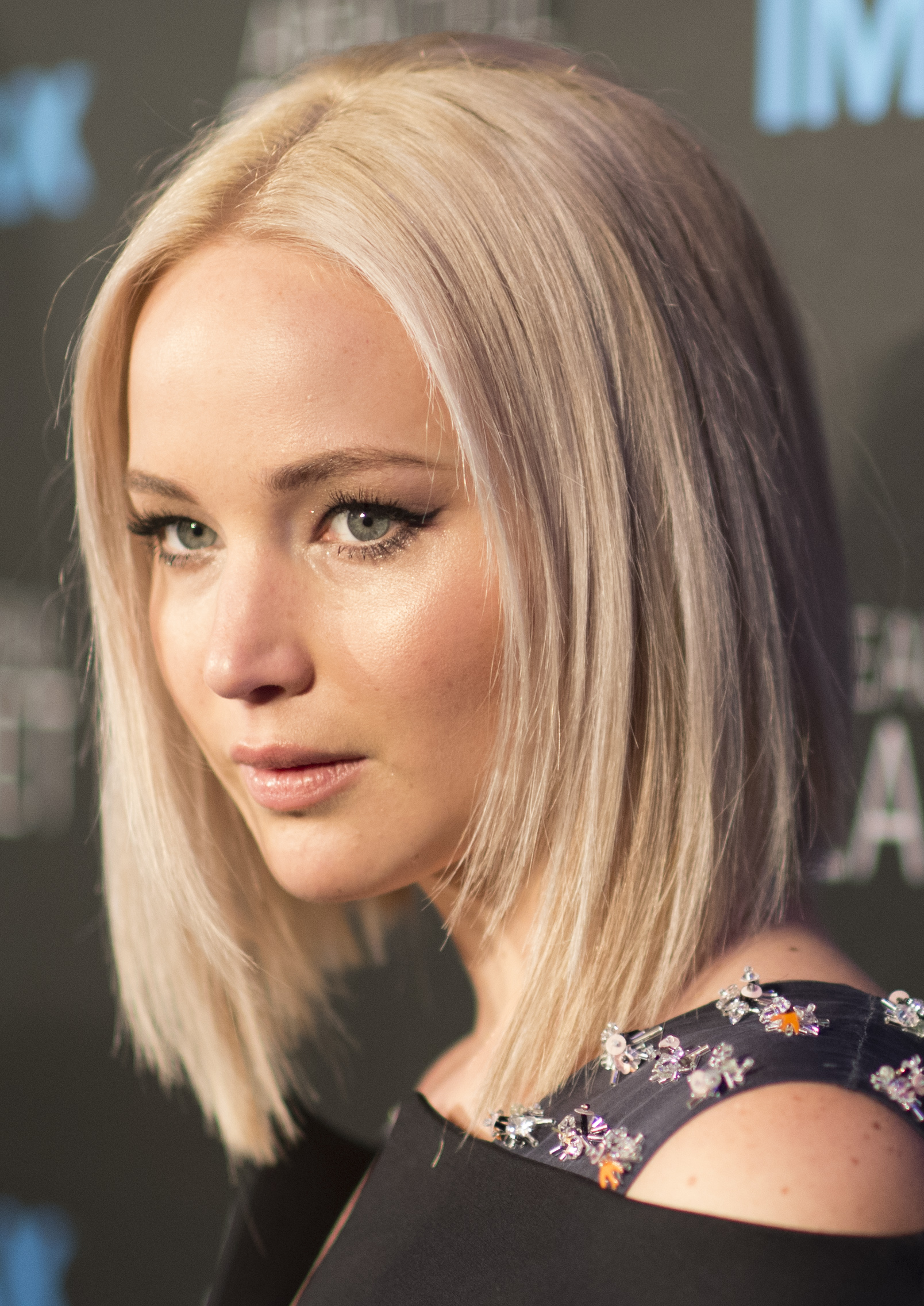
Jennifer Lawrence won for Silver Linings Playbook.

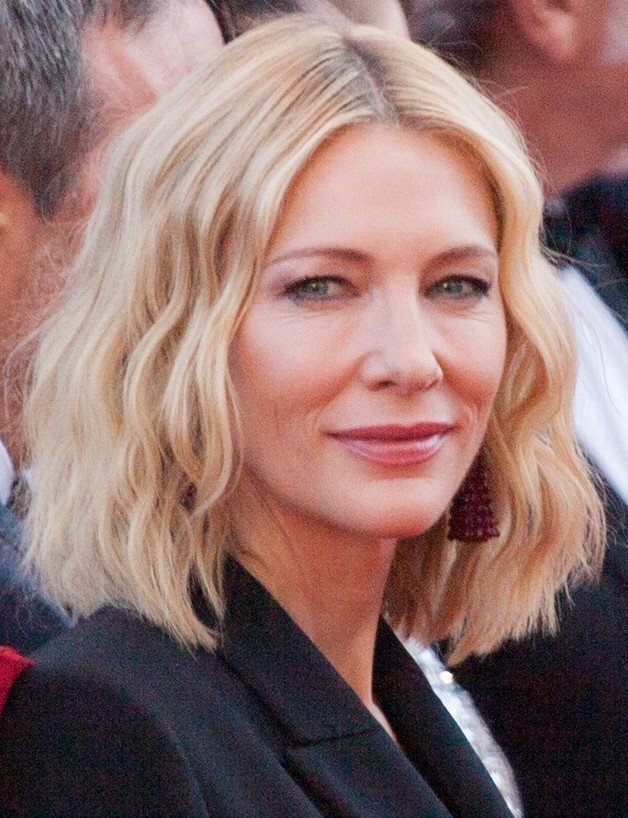
Cate Blanchett won for Blue Jasmine.

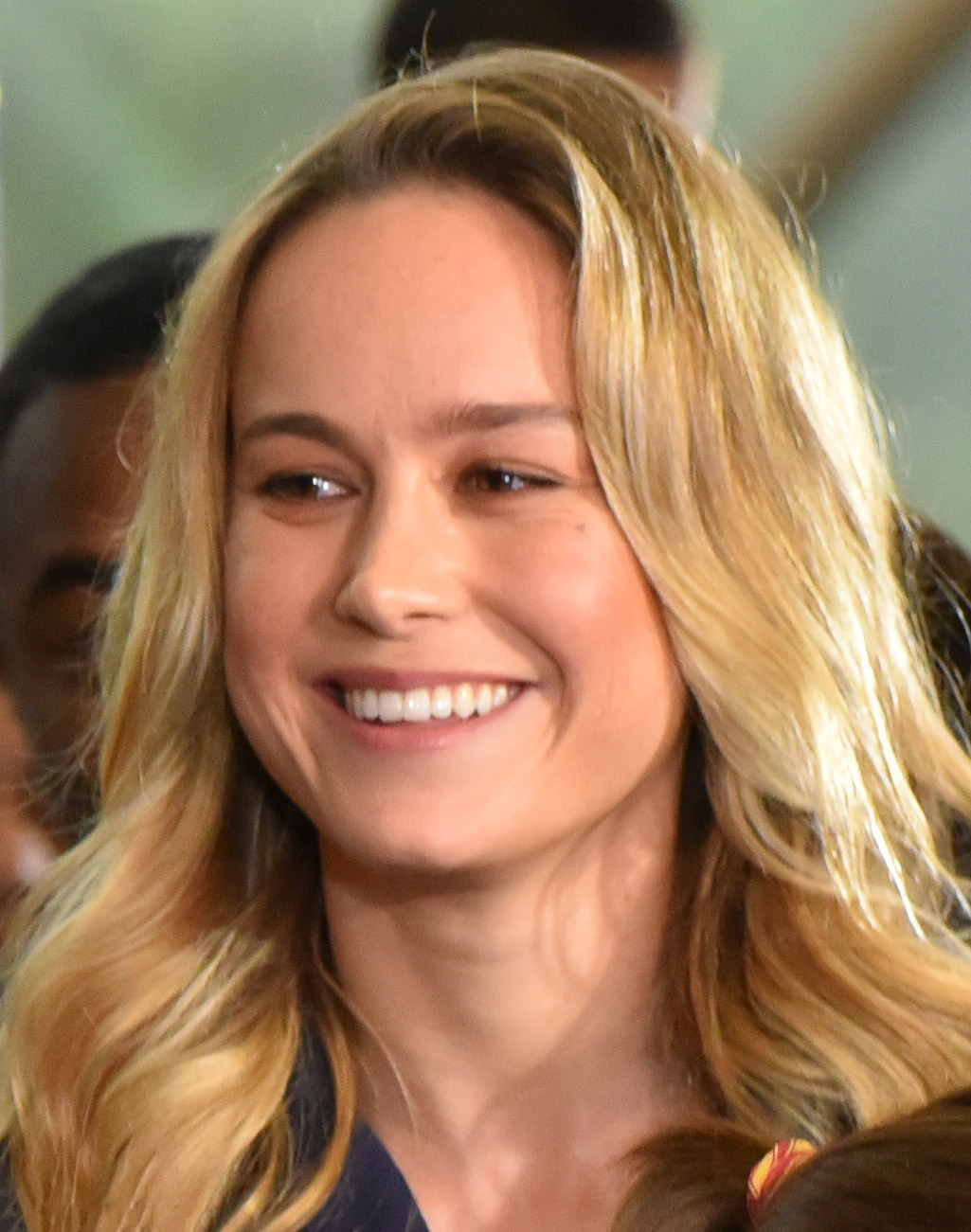
Brie Larson won for Room.

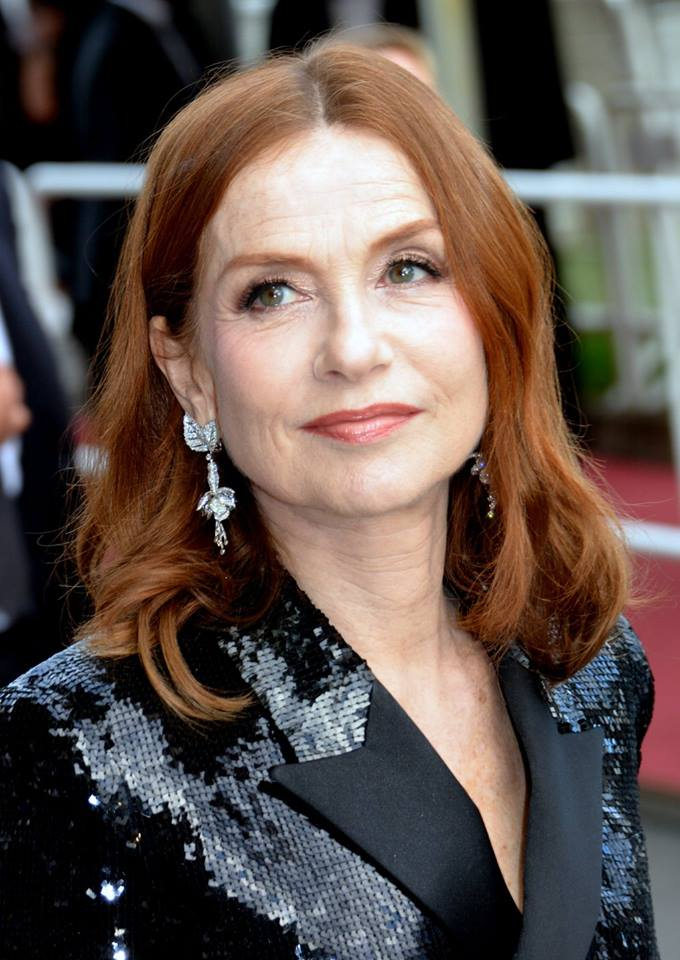
Isabelle Huppert won for Elle.

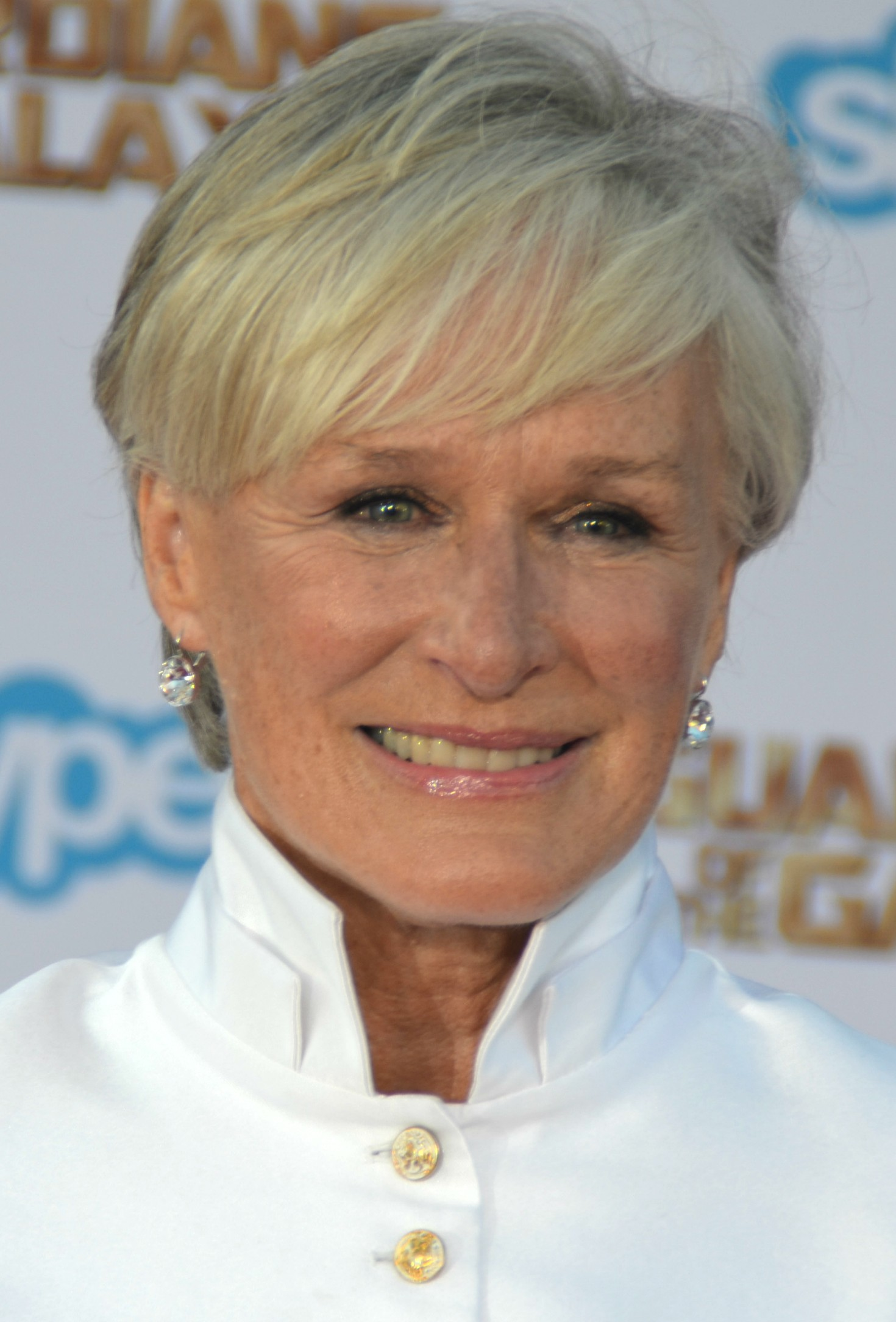
Glenn Close won for The Wife.

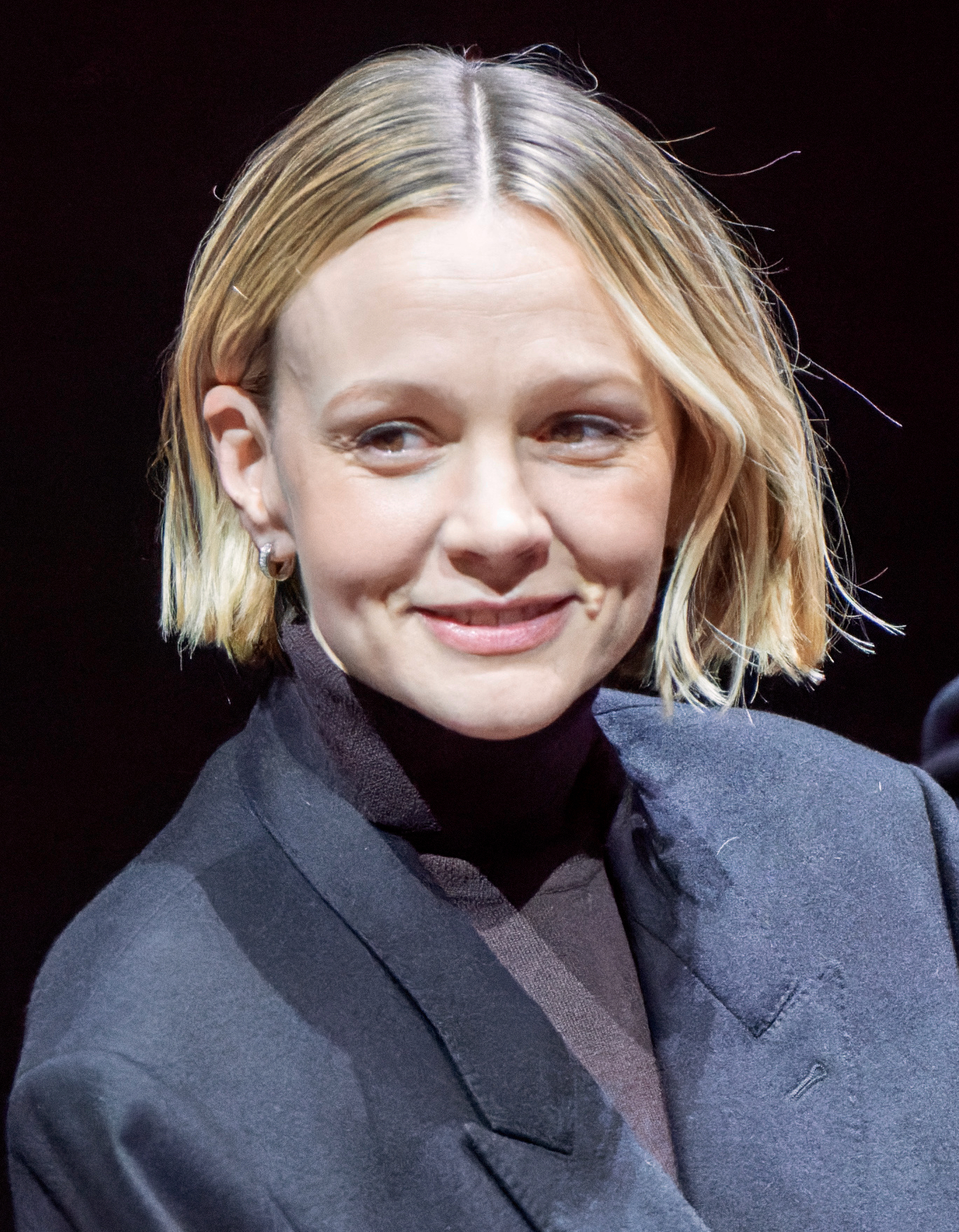
Carey Mulligan won for Promising Young Woman.

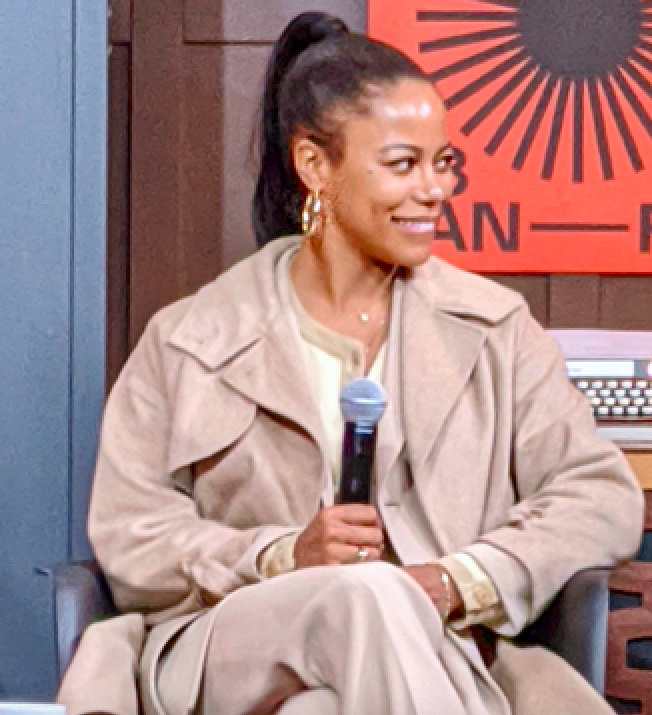
Taylour Paige was the final recipient for Zola.

=== 1980s ===
| Year | Actress | Film | Role |
|---|---|---|---|
| 1985 | Geraldine Page | The Trip to Bountiful | Carrie Watts |
| 1985 | Rosanna Arquette | After Hours | Marcy Franklin |
| 1985 | Laura Dern | Smooth Talk | Connie Wyatt |
| 1985 | Lori Singer | Trouble in Mind | Georgia |
| 1986 | Isabella Rossellini | Blue Velvet | Dorothy Vallens |
| 1986 | Elpidia Carrillo | Salvador | María |
| 1986 | Patricia Charbonneau | Desert Hearts | Cay Rivvers |
| 1986 | Laura Dern | Blue Velvet | Sandy Williams |
| 1986 | Tracy Camilla Johns | She's Gotta Have It | Nola Darling |
| 1987 | Sally Kirkland | Anna | Anna |
| 1987 | Lillian Gish | The Whales of August | Sarah Webber |
| 1987 | Debra Sandlund | Tough Guys Don't Dance | Patty Lareine |
| 1987 | Louise Smith | Working Girls | Molly |
| 1987 | Joanne Woodward | The Glass Menagerie | Amanda Wingfield |
| 1988 | Jodie Foster | Five Corners | Linda |
| 1988 | Ricki Lake | Hairspray | Tracy Turnblad |
| 1988 | Nobu McCarthy | The Wash | Masi Matsumoto |
| 1988 | Julia Roberts | Mystic Pizza | Daisy Arujo |
| 1988 | Meg Ryan | Promised Land | Bev Sykes |
| 1989 | Andie MacDowell | Sex, Lies, and Videotape | Ann Bishop Mullany |
| 1989 | Youki Kudoh | Mystery Train | Mitsuko |
| 1989 | Kelly Lynch | Drugstore Cowboy | Dianne |
| 1989 | Winona Ryder | Heathers | Veronica Sawyer |
| 1989 | Annabella Sciorra | True Love | Donna |

=== 1990s ===
| Year | Actress | Film | Role |
|---|---|---|---|
| 1990 | Anjelica Huston | The Grifters | Lilly Dillon |
| 1990 | Mary Alice | To Sleep with Anger | Suzie |
| 1990 | Eszter Balint | Bail Jumper | Elaine |
| 1990 | Carolyn Farina | Metropolitan | Audrey Rouget |
| 1990 | Joanne Woodward | Mr. & Mrs. Bridge | India Bridge |
| 1991 | Judy Davis | Impromptu | George Sand / Aurora |
| 1991 | Patsy Kensit | Twenty-One | Katie |
| 1991 | Mimi Rogers | The Rapture | Sharon |
| 1991 | Lili Taylor | Bright Angel | Lucy |
| 1991 | Lily Tomlin | The Search for Signs of Intelligent Life in the Universe | Various Characters |
| 1992 | Fairuza Balk | Gas Food Lodging | Shade |
| 1992 | Edie Falco | Laws of Gravity | Denise |
| 1992 | Catherine Keener | Johnny Suede | Yvonne |
| 1992 | Sheryl Lee | Twin Peaks: Fire Walk with Me | Laura Palmer |
| 1992 | Cynda Williams | One False Move | Lila "Fantasia" Walker |
| 1993 | Ashley Judd | Ruby in Paradise | Ruby Lee Gissing |
| 1993 | Suzy Amis Cameron | The Ballad of Little Jo | Josephine "Jo" Monaghan |
| 1993 | May Chin | The Wedding Banquet | Wei-Wei |
| 1993 | Ariyan A. Johnson | Just Another Girl on the I.R.T. | Chantel Mitchell |
| 1993 | Emma Thompson | Much Ado About Nothing | Beatrice |
| 1994 | Linda Fiorentino | The Last Seduction | Bridget Gregory / Wendy Kroy |
| 1994 | Jennifer Jason Leigh | Mrs. Parker and the Vicious Circle | Dorothy Parker |
| 1994 | Karen Sillas | What Happened Was... | Jackie Marsh |
| 1994 | Lauren Vélez | I Like It Like That | Lisette Linares |
| 1994 | Jacklyn Wu | Eat Drink Man Woman | Jia-Chien |
| 1995 | Elisabeth Shue | Leaving Las Vegas | Sera |
| 1995 | Jennifer Jason Leigh | Georgia | Sadie Flood |
| 1995 | Elina Löwensohn | Nadja | Nadja |
| 1995 | Julianne Moore | Safe | Carol White |
| 1995 | Lili Taylor | The Addiction | Kathleen Conklin |
| 1996 | Frances McDormand | Fargo | Marge Gunderson |
| 1996 | María Conchita Alonso | Caught | Betty |
| 1996 | Scarlett Johansson | Manny & Lo | Manny |
| 1996 | Catherine Keener | Walking and Talking | Amelia |
| 1996 | Renée Zellweger | The Whole Wide World | Novalyne Price |
| 1997 | Julie Christie | Afterglow | Phyllis Mann |
| 1997 | Stacy Edwards | In the Company of Men | Christine |
| 1997 | Alison Folland | All Over Me | Claude |
| 1997 | Lisa Harrow | Sunday | Madeleine Vesey |
| 1997 | Robin Wright | Loved | Hedda Amerson |
| 1998 | Ally Sheedy | High Art | Lucy Berliner |
| 1998 | Katrin Cartlidge | Claire Dolan | Claire Dolan |
| 1998 | Christina Ricci | The Opposite of Sex | Dede Truitt |
| 1998 | Robin Tunney | Niagara, Niagara | Marcy |
| 1998 | Alfre Woodard | Down in the Delta | Loretta Sinclair |
| 1999 | Hilary Swank | Boys Don't Cry | Brandon Teena |
| 1999 | Diane Lane | A Walk on the Moon | Pearl Kantrowitz |
| 1999 | Janet McTeer | Tumbleweeds | Mary Jo Walker |
| 1999 | Susan Traylor | Valerie Flake | Valerie Flake |
| 1999 | Reese Witherspoon | Election | Tracy Flick |

=== 2000s ===
| Year | Actress | Film | Role |
|---|---|---|---|
| 2000 | Ellen Burstyn | Requiem for a Dream | Sara Goldfarb |
| 2000 | Joan Allen | The Contender | Laine Hanson |
| 2000 | Sanaa Lathan | Love & Basketball | Monica Wright |
| 2000 | Laura Linney | You Can Count on Me | Samantha "Sammy" Prescott |
| 2000 | Kelly Macdonald | Two Family House | Mary O'Neary |
| 2001 | Sissy Spacek | In the Bedroom | Ruth Fowler |
| 2001 | Kim Dickens | Things Behind the Sun | Sherry |
| 2001 | Molly Parker | The Center of the World | Florence |
| 2001 | Tilda Swinton | The Deep End | Margaret Hall |
| 2001 | Kerry Washington | Lift | Niecy |
| 2002 | Julianne Moore | Far from Heaven | Cathy Whitaker |
| 2002 | Jennifer Aniston | The Good Girl | Justine Last |
| 2002 | Maggie Gyllenhaal | Secretary | Lee Holloway |
| 2002 | Catherine Keener | Lovely & Amazing | Michelle Marks |
| 2002 | Parker Posey | Personal Velocity | Greta Herskowitz |
| 2003 | Charlize Theron | Monster | Aileen Wuornos |
| 2003 | Agnes Bruckner | Blue Car | Megan Denning |
| 2003 | Zooey Deschanel | All the Real Girls | Noel |
| 2003 | Samantha Morton | In America | Sarah |
| 2003 | Elisabeth Moss | Virgin | Jessie Reynolds |
| 2004 | Catalina Sandino Moreno | Maria Full of Grace | María Álvarez |
| 2004 | Kimberly Elise | Woman Thou Art Loosed | Michelle Jordan |
| 2004 | Vera Farmiga | Down to the Bone | Irene Morrison |
| 2004 | Judy Marte | On the Outs | Oz |
| 2004 | Kyra Sedgwick | Cavedweller | Delia Byrd |
| 2005 | Felicity Huffman | Transamerica | Bree |
| 2005 | Dina Korzun | Forty Shades of Blue | Laura |
| 2005 | Laura Linney | The Squid and the Whale | Joan Berkman |
| 2005 | S. Epatha Merkerson | Lackawanna Blues | Rachel "Nanny" Crosby |
| 2005 | Cyndi Williams | Room | Julia Barker |
| 2006 | Shareeka Epps | Half Nelson | Drey |
| 2006 | Catherine O'Hara | For Your Consideration | Marilyn Hack |
| 2006 | Elizabeth Reaser | Sweet Land | Young Inge |
| 2006 | Michelle Williams | Land of Plenty | Lana |
| 2006 | Robin Wright | Sorry, Haters | Phoebe Torrence |
| 2007 | Elliot Page | Juno | Juno MacGuff |
| 2007 | Angelina Jolie | A Mighty Heart | Mariane Pearl |
| 2007 | Sienna Miller | Interview | Katya |
| 2007 | Parker Posey | Broken English | Nora Wilder |
| 2007 | Tang Wei | Lust, Caution | Wong Chia Chi / Mak Tai Tai |
| 2008 | Melissa Leo | Frozen River | Ray Eddy |
| 2008 | Summer Bishil | Towelhead | Jasira Maroun |
| 2008 | Anne Hathaway | Rachel Getting Married | Kym Buchman |
| 2008 | Tarra Riggs | Ballast | Marlee |
| 2008 | Michelle Williams | Wendy and Lucy | Wendy Carroll |
| 2009 | Gabourey Sidibe | Precious | Claireece "Precious" Jones |
| 2009 | Maria Bello | Downloading Nancy | Nancy Stockwell |
| 2009 | Nisreen Faour | Amreeka | Muna Farah |
| 2009 | Helen Mirren | The Last Station | Sophia Tolstaya |
| 2009 | Gwyneth Paltrow | Two Lovers | Michelle Rausch |

=== 2010s ===
| Year | Actress | Film | Role |
|---|---|---|---|
| 2010 | Natalie Portman | Black Swan | Nina Sayers |
| 2010 | Annette Bening | The Kids Are All Right | Nicole "Nic" Allgood |
| 2010 | Greta Gerwig | Greenberg | Florence Marr |
| 2010 | Nicole Kidman | Rabbit Hole | Becca Corbett |
| 2010 | Jennifer Lawrence | Winter's Bone | Ree Dolly |
| 2010 | Michelle Williams | Blue Valentine | Cindy Heller |
| 2011 | Michelle Williams | My Week with Marilyn | Marilyn Monroe |
| 2011 | Lauren Ambrose | About Sunny | Angela |
| 2011 | Rachael Harris | Natural Selection | Linda White |
| 2011 | Adepero Oduye | Pariah | Alike |
| 2011 | Elizabeth Olsen | Martha Marcy May Marlene | Martha |
| 2012 | Jennifer Lawrence | Silver Linings Playbook | Tiffany Maxwell |
| 2012 | Linda Cardellini | Return | Kelli |
| 2012 | Emayatzy Corinealdi | Middle of Nowhere | Ruby |
| 2012 | Quvenzhané Wallis | Beasts of the Southern Wild | Hushpuppy |
| 2012 | Mary Elizabeth Winstead | Smashed | Kate Hannah |
| 2013 | Cate Blanchett | Blue Jasmine | Jeanette "Jasmine" Francis |
| 2013 | Julie Delpy | Before Midnight | Céline Wallace |
| 2013 | Gaby Hoffmann | Crystal Fairy | Crystal Fairy |
| 2013 | Brie Larson | Short Term 12 | Grace Howard |
| 2013 | Shailene Woodley | The Spectacular Now | Aimee Finecky |
| 2014 | Julianne Moore | Still Alice | Dr. Alice Howland |
| 2014 | Marion Cotillard | The Immigrant | Ewa Cybulska |
| 2014 | Rinko Kikuchi | Kumiko: The Treasure Hunter | Kumiko |
| 2014 | Jenny Slate | Obvious Child | Donna Stern |
| 2014 | Tilda Swinton | Only Lovers Left Alive | Eve |
| 2015 | Brie Larson | Room | Joy "Ma" Newsome |
| 2015 | Cate Blanchett | Carol | Carol Aird |
| 2015 | Rooney Mara | Carol | Therese Belivet |
| 2015 | Bel Powley | The Diary of a Teenage Girl | Minnie Goetze |
| 2015 | Kitana Kiki Rodriguez | Tangerine | Sin-Dee Rella |
| 2016 | Isabelle Huppert | Elle | Michèle Leblanc |
| 2016 | Annette Bening | 20th Century Women | Dorothea Fields |
| 2016 | Sasha Lane | American Honey | Star |
| 2016 | Ruth Negga | Loving | Mildred Loving |
| 2016 | Natalie Portman | Jackie | Jacqueline Kennedy Onassis |
| 2017 | Frances McDormand | Three Billboards Outside Ebbing, Missouri | Mildred Hayes |
| 2017 | Salma Hayek | Beatriz at Dinner | Beatriz |
| 2017 | Margot Robbie | I, Tonya | Tonya Harding |
| 2017 | Saoirse Ronan | Lady Bird | Christine "Lady Bird" McPherson |
| 2017 | Shinobu Terajima | Oh Lucy! | Setsuko Kawashima / Lucy |
| 2017 | Regina Williams | Life and Nothing More | Regina |
| 2018 | Glenn Close | The Wife | Joan Castleman |
| 2018 | Toni Collette | Hereditary | Annie Graham |
| 2018 | Elsie Fisher | Eighth Grade | Kayla Day |
| 2018 | Regina Hall | Support the Girls | Lisa Conroy |
| 2018 | Helena Howard | Madeline's Madeline | Madeline |
| 2018 | Carey Mulligan | Wildlife | Jeanette Brinson |
| 2019 | Renée Zellweger | Judy | Judy Garland |
| 2019 | Karen Allen | Colewell | Nora Pancowski |
| 2019 | Hong Chau | Driveways | Kathy |
| 2019 | Elisabeth Moss | Her Smell | Becky Something |
| 2019 | Mary Kay Place | Diane | Diane |
| 2019 | Alfre Woodard | Clemency | Warden Bernadine Williams |

=== 2020s ===
| Year | Actress | Film | Role |
|---|---|---|---|
| 2020 | Carey Mulligan | Promising Young Woman | Cassandra "Cassie" Thomas |
| 2020 | Nicole Beharie | Miss Juneteenth | Turquoise Jones |
| 2020 | Viola Davis | Ma Rainey's Black Bottom | Gertrude "Ma" Rainey |
| 2020 | Sidney Flanigan | Never Rarely Sometimes Always | Autumn Callahan |
| 2020 | Julia Garner | The Assistant | Jane |
| 2020 | Frances McDormand | Nomadland | Fern |
| 2021 | Taylour Paige | Zola | Aziah "Zola" King |
| 2021 | Isabelle Fuhrman | The Novice | Alex Dall |
| 2021 | Brittany S. Hall | Test Pattern | Renesha |
| 2021 | Patti Harrison | Together Together | Anna Caper |
| 2021 | Kali Reis | Catch the Fair One | Kaylee |

== Multiple winners ==
2 wins

- Frances McDormand
- Julianne Moore

== Multiple nominees ==
4 nominations

- Michelle Williams

3 nominations

- Catherine Keener
- Frances McDormand
- Julianne Moore

2 nominations

- Annette Bening
- Cate Blanchett
- Laura Dern
- Brie Larson
- Jennifer Lawrence
- Jennifer Jason Leigh
- Laura Linney
- Elisabeth Moss
- Carey Mulligan
- Natalie Portman
- Parker Posey
- Tilda Swinton
- Lili Taylor
- Alfre Woodard
- Joanne Woodward
- Robin Wright
- Renée Zellweger

== See also ==
- Academy Award for Best Actress
- Critics' Choice Movie Award for Best Actress
- BAFTA Award for Best Actress in a Leading Role
- Golden Globe Award for Best Actress in a Motion Picture – Drama
- Golden Globe Award for Best Actress – Motion Picture Comedy or Musical
- Screen Actors Guild Award for Outstanding Performance by a Female Actor in a Leading Role
