= Rinko Kikuchi =

Japanese actress (born 1981)

- 菊地 凛子
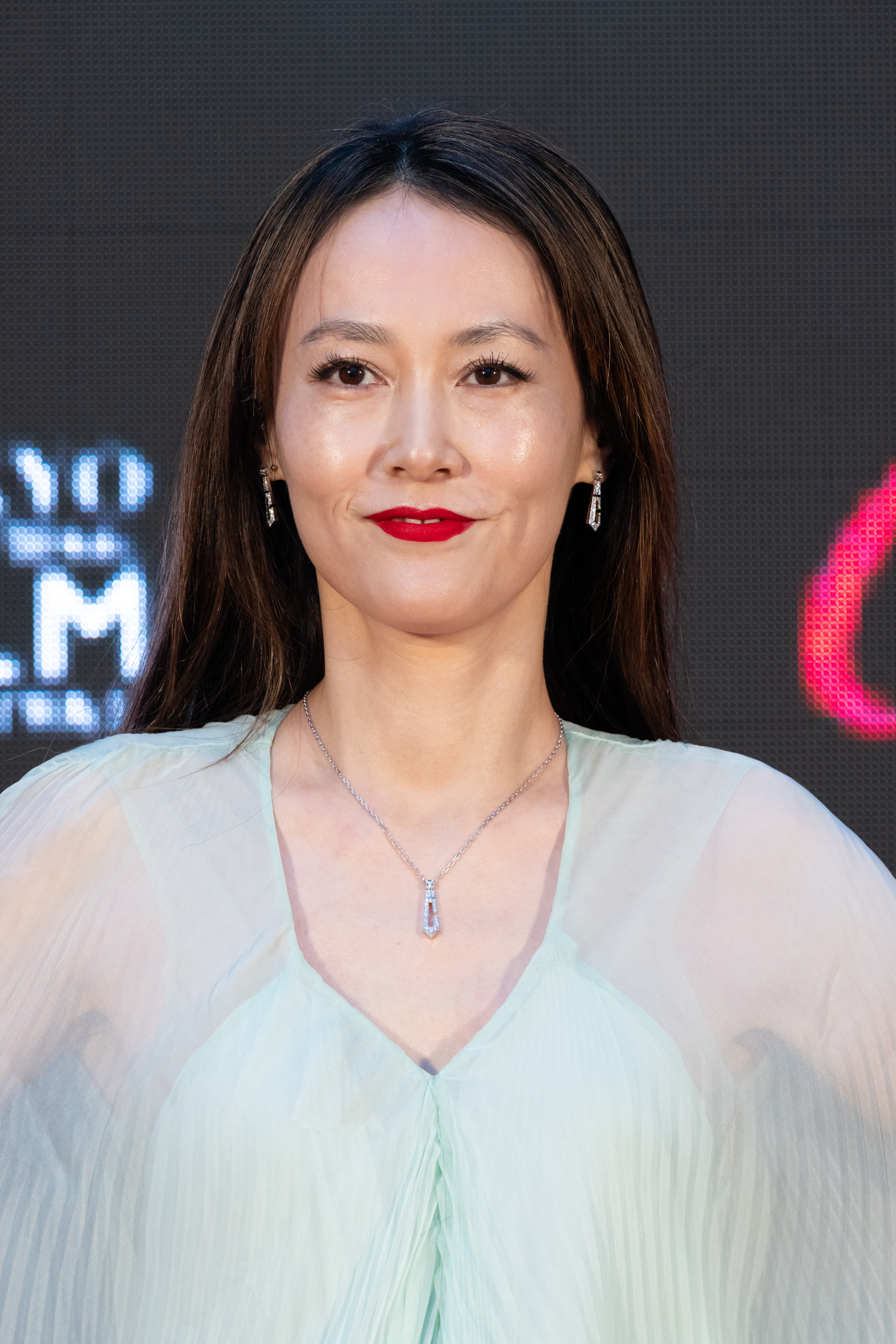
- Kikuchi at the 37th Tokyo International Film Festival in October 2024
- Born: Yuriko Kikuchi; January 6, 1981 (age 45); Hadano, Kanagawa, Japan
- Occupation: Actress
- Years active: 1999–present
- Height: 1.69 m (5 ft 6 1/2 in)
- Spouse: Shōta Sometani (m. 2014)
- Children: 2
- Website: www.rinkokikuchi.com

Rinko Kikuchi () (菊地 凛子, Kikuchi Rinko; born Yuriko Kikuchi (菊地 百合子, Kikuchi Yuriko), January 6, 1981) is a Japanese actress. She was the first Japanese actress to be nominated for an Academy Award in 50 years, for her work in Babel (2006). Kikuchi's other notable films include Norwegian Wood (2010), which screened in competition at the 67th Venice Film Festival and Guillermo del Toro's science fiction action film Pacific Rim (2013). For her role in the drama film Kumiko, the Treasure Hunter (2014), Kikuchi received an Independent Spirit Award nomination for Best Female Lead. She played a supporting role in the HBO Max crime drama series Tokyo Vice.

== Early life ==
Kikuchi was born on January 6, 1981, in Hadano, Kanagawa, the youngest of three children. She was discovered by a talent agent inside the shopping mall Laforet Harajuku at the age of 15.

== Career ==
Kikuchi made her debut in 1999, under her birth name, Yuriko Kikuchi, with the Kaneto Shindo film Will to Live. Soon after, in 2001, she starred in the celebrated Kazuyoshi Komuri film Sora no Ana (空の穴), which was featured at several international festivals, including the Rotterdam Film Festival. In 2004, Kikuchi appeared in the well-received Katsuhito Ishii film The Taste of Tea, which was selected for the Cannes Film Festival.

In 2006, Kikuchi was chosen by Japanese film producer Yoko Narahashi for the Alejandro González Iñárritu film Babel, where she played Chieko Wataya, a troubled, deaf teenage girl, for which she received international attention. She was nominated for the Academy Award for Best Supporting Actress. Kikuchi was the fourth person in Academy Award history to be nominated for a role in which she does not speak. She won several awards, such as the National Board of Review Award for Best Breakthrough Female Performance (tying with Jennifer Hudson) and the Gotham Independent Film Award for Breakthrough Actor. Since her appearance in the movie "Babel", she has been actively involved in numerous films outside of Japan. Under the name Rinbjö (リンビョウ), she also pursues musical activities.

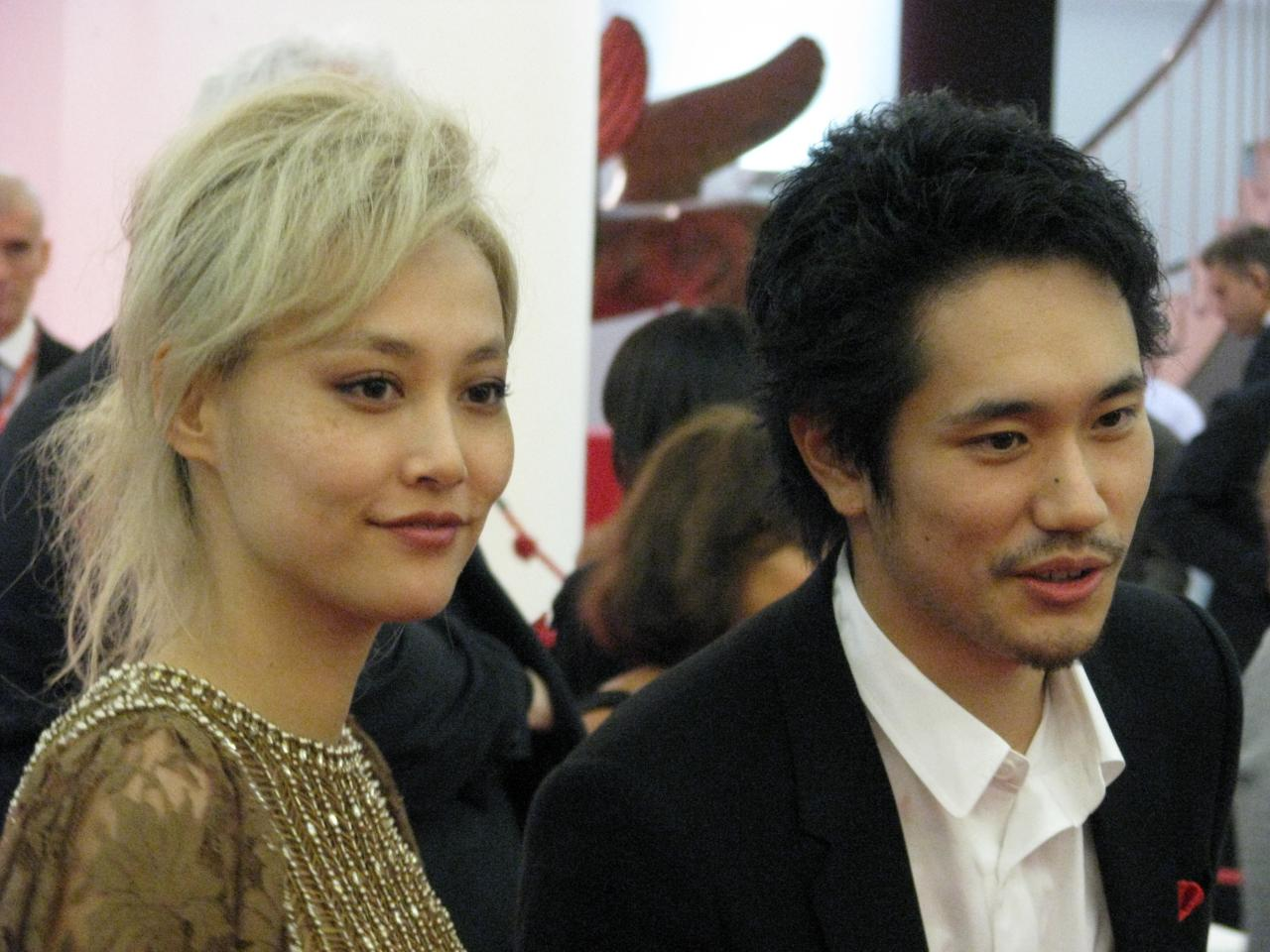
Kikuchi (left) with Kenichi Matsuyama attending the Venice Film Festival in 2010.

She has appeared in two of Mamoru Oshii's films: The Sky Crawlers (2008) and Assault Girls (2009). Kikuchi starred in Rian Johnson's second film, The Brothers Bloom (2008), which was her first full English-language feature. Though she plays a main character, she only speaks three words; her character is said to only know three words of English.

In 2010, Kikuchi was cast as Naoko in Tran Anh Hung's adaptation of Haruki Murakami's novel Norwegian Wood. In March 2011, she was added to the cast of 47 Ronin, the first English-language adaptation of the Japanese Chushingura legend of samurai loyalty and revenge. Kikuchi described her villain character to the American version of Glamour as "a real bitch." In 2013, she appears in Pacific Rim, having improved her English by watching the American television series The Voice.

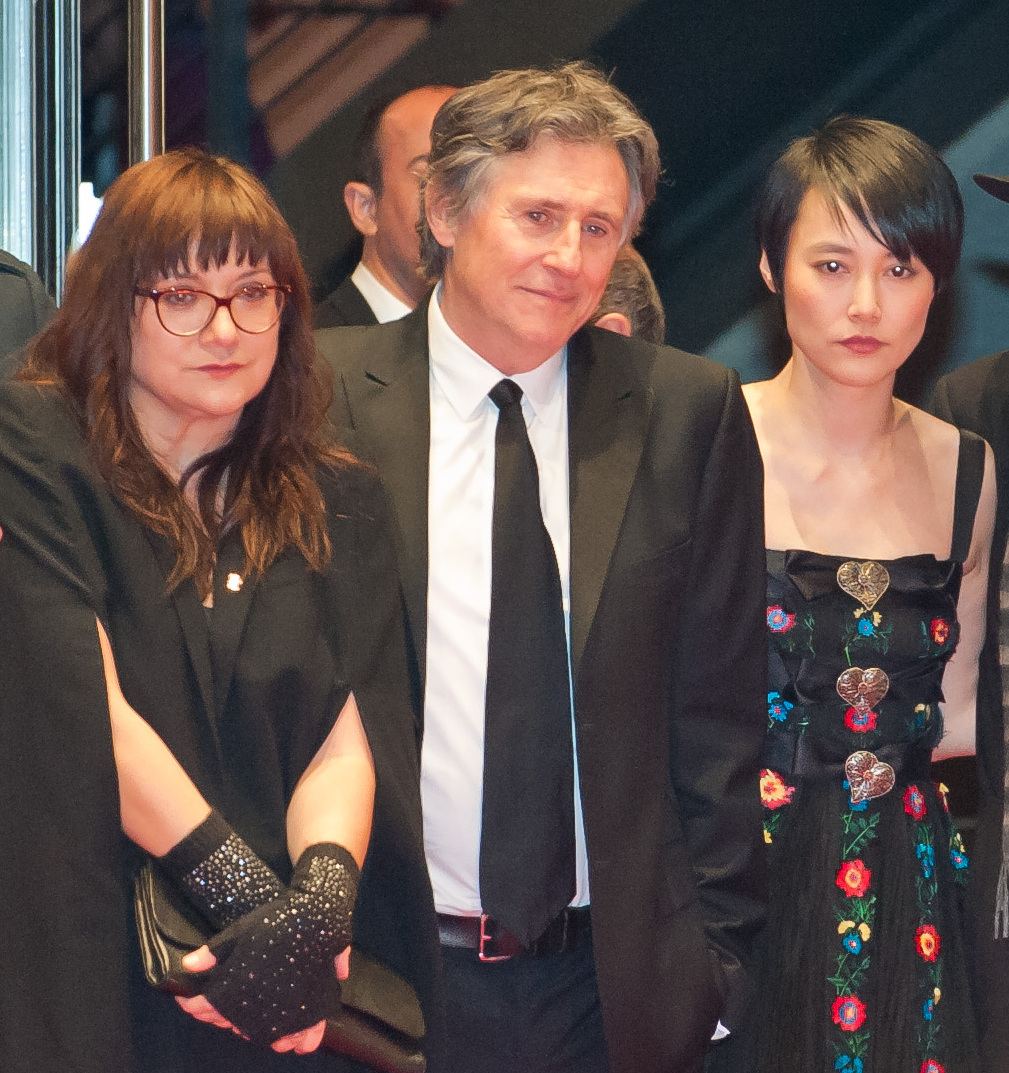
Kikuchi (far right) at the opening of the 65th Berlin International Film Festival in 2015.

In 2014, Kikuchi starred in Kumiko, the Treasure Hunter, directed by David Zellner. Kikuchi was cast in the Season 2 of the HBO science fiction series Westworld.

Kikuchi plays the role of Emi Maruyama, the supervisor of the lead character Jake Adelstein, in the 2022 HBO Max series Tokyo Vice. In August 2022, she portrayed a taxi driver in the music video for Mondo Grosso's "Crypt".

In 2024, she featured on the official poster of 37th Tokyo International Film Festival, created by fashion designer Koshino Junko. She was also appointed festival navigator, who "navigated" the audience at official events as the face of the festival.

== Personal life ==
From 2010 to 2011, Kikuchi was in a relationship with director Spike Jonze, with whom she briefly resided in New York.

Kikuchi married Japanese actor Shōta Sometani on December 31, 2014. In October 2016, Kikuchi gave birth to their first child. Their second child was born in late 2018.

== Filmography ==
=== Film ===
Year	Title	Role	Notes	Ref.
1999	Will to Live			
2000	By Player			
2000	Akai Shibafu			
2001	Paradise			
2001	Hole in the Sky	Taeko		
2001	Drug	Mai		
2002	Mike Yokohama: A Forest with No Name	Number 51		
2002	Hachigatsu no Maboroshi			
2003	Age 17 : 17-sai	Hitomi		
2004	Tori			
2004	The Taste of Tea	Yuriko Kikuchi		
2004	69			
2004	Survive Style 5+			
2004	The Reason			
2005	Tagatameni: Portrait of the Wind			
2006	Funky Forest: The First Contact	Kikuchi		
2006	Arch Angels	Nobuko Sakurai		
2006	Babel	Chieko Wataya		
2006	Umi de no hanashi	Kaori		
2007	Deathfix: Die and Let Live	Sayoko		
2007	Genius Party		Voice	
2007	Tokyo Serendipity	Junda Atsuko		
2008	The Brothers Bloom	Bang Bang		
2008	The Sky Crawlers	Suito Kusanagi	Voice	
2008	Kiru – KILL			
2009	Map of the Sounds of Tokyo	Ryu		
2009	Strawberry Seminar			
2009	Sideways	Mina Parker		
2009	Assault Girls	Lucifer		
2009	42 One Dream Rush			
2010	Shanghai	Sumiko	Uncredited	
2010	Norwegian Wood	Naoko		
2011	At River's Edge	Tazu		
2011	Love Strikes!	Naoko Hayashida		
2011	The Warped Forest			
2013	Pacific Rim	Mako Mori		
2013	47 Ronin	Witch		
2014	Kumiko, the Treasure Hunter	Kumiko		
2014	Last Summer	Naomi		
2015	Nobody Wants the Night	Allaka		
2015	Dear Deer		Cameo	
2016	Terra Formars	Asuka Moriki		
2017	Highheels: A Fairy Tale Born of Obsession		Short film	
2018	Pacific Rim Uprising	Mako Mori		
2019	We Are Little Zombies	Yūko		
2022	What to Do with the Dead Kaiju?	Colonel Sen Masago		
2023	In Love and Deep Water	Aina Horikawa		
2023	Yoko	Yoko		
2024	Who's Gone	Terada		
2025	Ya Boy Kongming! The Movie	Ayvil Suzuki		
2026	Ha-Chan, Shake Your Booty!	Haru		

=== Television ===
Year	Title	Role	Notes	Ref.
1999	Bakayaro! Special 2			
1999	Kawaii dakeja Dame kashira			
2001	Churasan		Asadora	
2001	kokiku			
2002	The Private Detective Mike Hama			
2003	Uchu ni Ichiban Chikai basho			
2003	Ai to Shihonshugi			
2004	The Reason			
2009–2010	Liar Game 2	Ryo Katsuragi		
2010	Moteki	Naoko Hayashida		
2014	Gu-Gu Datte Neko de Aru	Chikako		
2015	To Give a Dream	Mikiko Abe	Miniseries	
2018	Westworld	Akane		
2019	A Butterfly Effect: The Murder Analysis Team	Machiko Aiba		
2021–2023	Invasion	Hinata		
2022	PICU	Samejima Tatsuki		
2022	The 13 Lords of the Shogun	Noe	Taiga drama	
2022–2024	Tokyo Vice	Emi Maruyama	2 seasons	
2023–2024	Boogie Woogie	Ritsuko Ibarada	Asadora	
2024	The Tiger and Her Wings	Ritsuko Ibarada	Asadora	
2025	The Hot Spot	Masako Umemoto		
2025	Pray Speak What Has Happened	The woman at the information desk		
2027	Dangerous	Matsuko Tanizaki		

== Awards and nominations ==
Awards and nominations received by Rinko Kikuchi
Organizations (Note: Awards, festivals, honors and other miscellaneous organizations are listed in alphabetical order.)	Year (Note: Indicates the year of ceremony. Each year is linked to the article about the awards held that year, wherever possible.)	Category	Work	Result	Ref.
Academy Awards	2007	Best Supporting Actress	Babel	Nominated	
Alliance of Women Film Journalists	2006	Best Breakthrough Performance For A Young Actress	Babel	Nominated	
Asian Film Awards	2011	Best Actress	Norwegian Wood	Nominated	
Asian Film Awards	2024	Best Actress	Yoko	Nominated	
Austin Film Critics Association	2007	Best Supporting Actress	Babel	Won	
Chicago Film Critics Association	2006	Best Supporting Actress	Babel	Won	
Chicago Film Critics Association	2006	Most Promising Performer	Babel	Nominated	
Chlotrudis Society for Independent Films	2010	Best Supporting Actress	The Brothers Bloom	Nominated	
Chlotrudis Society for Independent Films	2016	Best Actress	Kumiko, the Treasure Hunter	Nominated	
Columbus Film Critics Association	2007	Best Supporting Actress	Babel	Runner-up	
Critics' Choice Movie Awards	2007	Best Acting Ensemble	Babel	Nominated	
Critics' Choice Movie Awards	2007	Best Supporting Actress	Babel	Nominated	
Gold Derby Awards	2007	Best Supporting Actress	Babel	Nominated	
Gold Derby Awards	2007	Best Ensemble Cast	Babel	Nominated	
Gold Derby Awards	2018	Drama Guest Actress	Westworld	Nominated	
Golden Globe Awards	2007	Best Supporting Actress – Motion Picture	Babel	Nominated	
Gotham Awards	2006	Best Ensemble Cast	Babel	Won	
Gotham Awards	2006	Breakthrough Actor (Note: Shared with Shareeka Epps.)	Babel	Won	
Independent Spirit Awards	2014	Best Female Lead	Kumiko, the Treasure Hunter	Nominated	
Mainichi Film Awards	2024	Best Actress	Yoko	Nominated	
National Board of Review	2007	Best Breakthrough Performance - Female (Note: Shared with Jennifer Hudson.)	Babel	Won	
Online Film & Television Association	2007	Best Brekathrough Performance: Female	Babel	Nominated	
Online Film & Television Association	2007	Best Supporting Actress	Babel	Nominated	
Online Film & Television Association	2018	Best Guest Actress In A Drama Series	Westworld	Nominated	
Online Film Critics Society	2007	Best Supporting Actress	Babel	Nominated	
Online Film Critics Society	2007	Breakthrough Performer	Babel	Nominated	
Palm Springs International Film Festival	2007	Best Ensemble Cast	Babel	Won	
San Diego Film Critics Society	2006	Best Ensemble	Babel	Won	
Satellite Award	2006	Best Supporting Actress	Babel	Nominated	
Screen Actors Guild Awards	2007	Outstanding Performance by a Female Actor in a Supporting Role	Babel	Nominated	
Screen Actors Guild Awards	2007	Outstanding Performance by a Cast in a Motion Picture	Babel	Nominated	
Shanghai International Film Festival	2023	Best Actress	Yoko	Won	
Tama Film Awards	2023	Best Actress	Yoko	Won	
Toronto Film Critics Association	2006	Best Supporting Actress	Babel	Nominated	
Utah Film Critics Association	2006	Best Supporting Performance by an Actor, Female	Babel	Won	

== See also ==
- Asian Americans in arts and entertainment
- List of Academy Award winners and nominees from Japan
- List of Academy Award winners and nominees of Asian descent
- List of actors with Academy Award nominations
