= Kumiko, the Treasure Hunter =

2014 film directed by David Zellner

- Theatrical release poster
- Directed by: David Zellner
- Written by: David Zellner; Nathan Zellner
- Produced by: Jim Burke; Andrew Banks; Cameron Lamb; Chris Ohlson; Nathan Zellner
- Starring: Rinko Kikuchi
- Cinematography: Sean Porter
- Edited by: Melba Jodorowsky
- Music by: The Octopus Project
- Production companies: Ad Hominem Enterprises; Lila 9th Productions
- Distributed by: Amplify
- Release dates: January 20, 2014 (Sundance); February 8, 2014 (Berlin); March 13, 2015
- Running time: 104 minutes
- Country: United States
- Languages: English; Japanese
- Box office: $543,894

Kumiko, the Treasure Hunter is a 2014 American drama film co-written and directed by David Zellner. The film stars Rinko Kikuchi, Nobuyuki Katsube, Shirley Venard, David Zellner, Nathan Zellner, and Kanako Higashi. Alexander Payne and Kikuchi serve as executive producers.

The story is based on the urban legend surrounding Takako Konishi, and her search of the fictional ransom money seen buried in the snow from the 1996 film Fargo.

== Plot ==
Kumiko is a twenty-nine year old office lady who lives in utter solitude in Tokyo. She works a dreadful, dead-end job under a boss she hates (who in turn, hates her), unable to connect to her fashionable peers, and nagged by her overbearing mother to find a man and get married. The only joys in her life come from her pet rabbit, Bunzo, and treasure hunting – which leads her to find a VHS copy of the film Fargo in a secluded cave on the shore. Convinced the film is real, Kumiko obsesses over the film, focusing on the scene in which a character played by Steve Buscemi buries a satchel of ransom money along a snowy highway, obsessively detailing and noting each aspect of the scene and the film overall. Kumiko even attempts to steal an atlas from a library, only to be caught by the security guard, who pities her and allows her to take the map of Minnesota.

Under threat of being replaced, a failed reconnection with an old friend, and her mother's increasing nagging, Kumiko abandons Bunzo on a train and boards a plane to Minneapolis using her boss's company card. With a hand-stitched treasure map and a quixotic spirit, Kumiko embarks on a journey over the Pacific and through the frozen Minnesota plains to find the purported fortune. Once there, she quickly finds herself unprepared for the harsh winter, and unable to communicate due to her weak grasp of English beyond "Fargo". She is sheltered by an old lady, but sneaks off when the lady tries to convince her to stay at her home.

A sheriff's deputy picks her up after passersby report her wandering through the streets, believing her to be lost. She shows him the film and he attempts to understand her, gaining her trust, but repeatedly attempts to tell her that the film is not real – later driving her to a Chinese restaurant in hopes of finding a translator, unaware that Chinese and Japanese are not mutually intelligible. While at the restaurant, Kumiko calls her mother from a payphone hoping that she would be able to wire her money only for her mother to disown her after being told she stole her boss's credit card. This leads to Kumiko breaking down in front of the officer. While buying her winter attire, Kumiko kisses the officer, but he explains that he is married and tries again to explain to her that the treasure isn't real; upset, Kumiko runs from the store and leaves in a taxi, where she plots a course to Fargo. En route, she suddenly demands the taxi to stop, then flees into the wilderness, unable to pay. She soon comes across a frozen lake where, while looking through the ice, she sees what appears to be a suitcase. Convinced that this is the treasure, she spends a long time attempting to break the ice, only to find a badly decayed oar.

That night, during a snowstorm, Kumiko wanders deeper into the forest, the storm growing more and more violent until she is buried. The next morning, Kumiko emerges from the snow, and wanders through a hallucinatory landscape until she happens upon what appears to be the setting of the Fargo scene and sees the marker indicating the location of the treasure. She finds the satchel containing the money. Overjoyed with her triumph, she exclaims, "I was right after all." Bunzo appears, and, with him, she proudly walks into the distance.

== Cast ==
- Rinko Kikuchi as Kumiko
- Nobuyuki Katsube as Sakagami
- Shirley Venard as Older woman
- David Zellner as Policeman
- Nathan Zellner as Robert
- Kanako Higashi as Michi
- Ayaka Onishi as Chieko
- Mayuko Kawakita as Ms. Kanazaki
- Yumiko Hioki as Kumiko's mother
- Brad Prather as Brad

== Release ==
Kumiko, the Treasure Hunter had its world premiere on January 20, 2014 at the 2014 Sundance Film Festival as part of the US Dramatic Competition. It later made its International Premiere at the 64th Berlin International Film Festival on February 8, 2014. The film has gone on to screen at South by Southwest, BamCinemaFest, Maryland, Karlovy Vary, and Sydney Film Festival.

=== Re-release ===
In February 2024, Bleecker Street, distributor of the Zellners' Sasquatch Sunset, which premiered at the Sundance Film Festival nearly ten years to the day Kumiko premiered at its 2014 edition, announced that they would be re-releasing the latter in select theaters in the United States on March 22, 2024 to mark its 10th anniversary, with a release on VOD to follow on April 2.

== Reception ==
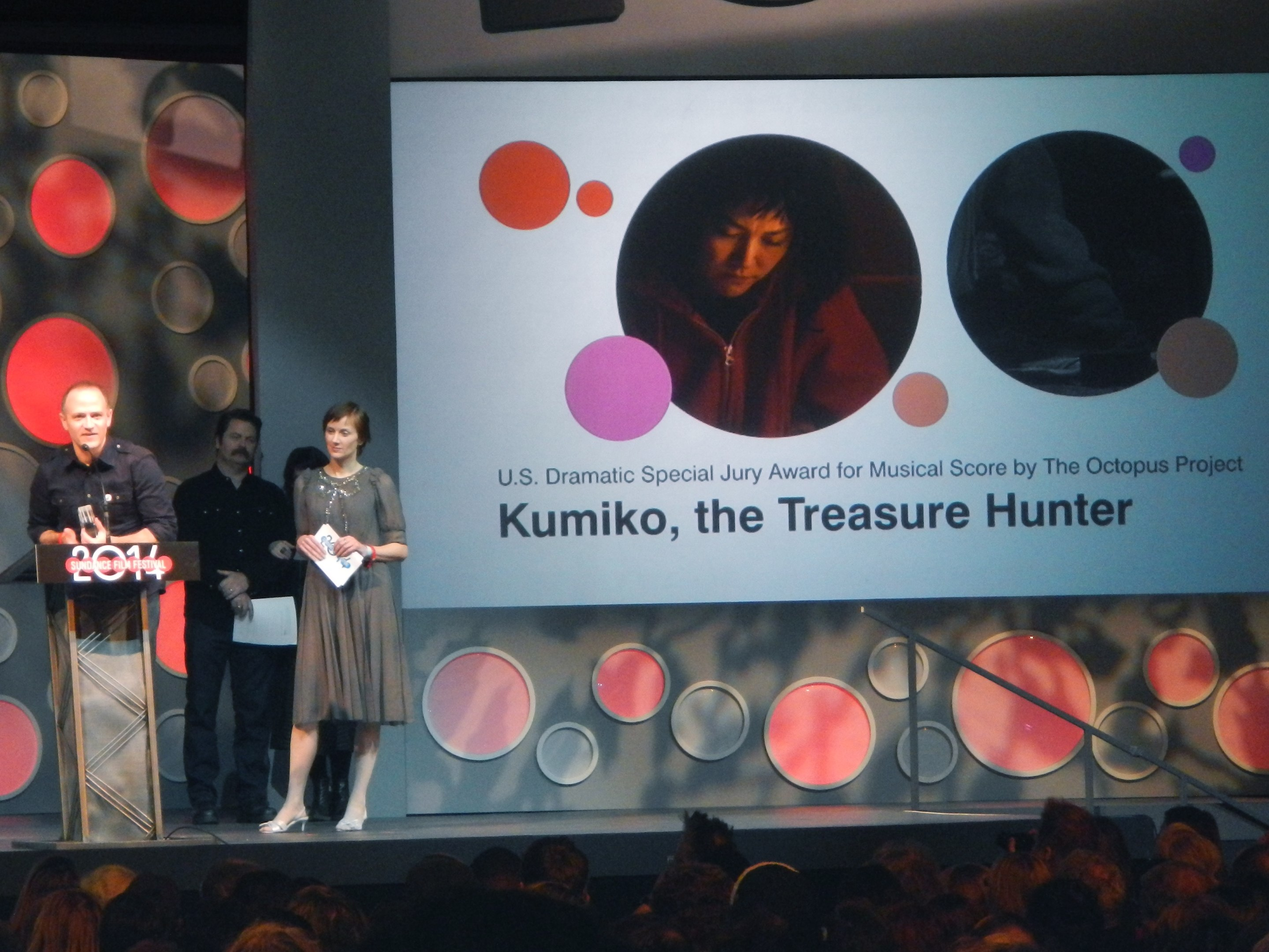
The Octopus Project won the U.S. Dramatic Special Jury Award for Musical Score at the festival.

The film received largely positive reviews upon its premiere at the 2014 Sundance Film Festival. Review aggregator Rotten Tomatoes gives the film an 88% rating based on reviews from 138 critics, with an average score of 7.2/10. The critics' consensus reads "Powerfully acted and lovely to look at, Kumiko, the Treasure Hunter offers a treat for cinephiles with a taste for the pleasantly peculiar." Metacritic gives the film a score of 68 based on reviews from 31 critics, indicating "generally favorable" reviews.

Scott Foundas, in his review for Variety, gave the film a positive review by saying that "A beguiling fable of buried treasure and movie-fed obsession" and added that "At every turn, we can sense what's going on behind Kumiko's doleful, downcast eyes; Kikuchi pulls us deeply into her world." Todd McCarthy in his review for The Hollywood Reporter called the film "A work of rigorously disciplined eccentricity, Kumiko, the Treasure Hunter is at once entirely accessible and yet appealing only to a rarified crowd ready to key into its narrow-bandwidth sense of humor." Eric Kohn of Indiewire praised the film and said that "Striking a complex tone of tragedy and uplift at the same time, Kumiko, the Treasure Hunter both celebrates the escapist power of personal fantasies and bears witness to their dangerous extremes. It's the rare case of a story that's inspirational and devastating at once." David Ehrlich of Film.com gave the film 9.1 out of 10, saying: "Less of an homage to Fargo than the next appendage of the same exquisite corpse, Kumiko, the Treasure Hunter plays like a dryly hilarious riff on Don't Look Now"; he added that it was "one of the best films to ever premiere at Sundance."

== Accolades ==
The film went on to be nominated for two Independent Spirit Awards: Best Director and Best Female Lead. For his work on Kumiko and other films, producer Chris Ohlson received the Spirit Award's Piaget Producers Award.

| Year | Award | Category | Recipient | Result | Ref. |
|---|---|---|---|---|---|
| 2014 | Sundance Film Festival | U.S. Grand Jury Prize: Dramatic | David Zellner | Nominated | |
| 2014 | Sundance Film Festival | U.S. Dramatic Special Jury Award for Musical Score | The Octopus Project | Won | |
| 2014 | Fantasia (Montreal) International Film Festival | Best Director | David Zellner | Won | |
| 2014 | Little Rock Film Festival | Best Feature Film – Golden Rock Narrative Award | David Zellner | Won | |
| 2014 | Nantucket Film Festival | Showtime Tony Cox Award – Best Screenwriting in a Feature Film | David Zellner; Nathan Zellner | Won | |
| 2014 | Las Palmas Film Festival | Audience Award – Best Feature Film | David Zellner | Won | |
| 2014 | Las Palmas Film Festival | Special Jury Award | David Zellner | Won | |
| 2014 | Sydney Film Festival | Best Feature Film | David Zellner | Nominated | |
| 2014 | Independent Spirit Awards | Best Director | David Zellner | Nominated | |
| 2014 | Independent Spirit Awards | Best Female Lead | Rinko Kikuchi | Nominated | |
| 2015 | Crested Butte Film Festival | Best Narrative Feature | David Zellner | Won | |
| 2016 | Chlotrudis Society for Independent Films | Best Actress | Rinko Kikuchi | Nominated | |
