= Chris Ohlson =

American video artist and director

- Born: Robert Christopher Ohlson; August 24, 1975 (age 50); Lancaster, New Hampshire, U.S.
- Occupation(s): Film producer and director
- Awards: 2015 Piaget Producers Award

Chris Ohlson (born August 24, 1975) is an American video artist and director based in Brooklyn, New York.

Ohlson is the 2015 Independent Spirit Piaget Producers Award winner, a 2013 Creative Producing Fellow of The Sundance Institute, and an alum of IFP's Narrative Lab Program.

== Career ==
=== The Overbrook Brothers ===
Ohlson's first film as a producer, John Bryant's The Overbrook Brothers, screened in competition at SXSW in 2009. The film went on to play at numerous festivals around the world before being distributed by IFC Films. Ain't It Cool News called The Overbrook Brothers, "Delightful…a smart and funny film."

=== The Happy Poet ===
Following the success of The Overbrook Brothers, Ohlson executive produced The Happy Poet, which screened at more than 50 domestic and international festivals, (including the 67th Venice Film Festival) and earned critical praise from Entertainment Weekly, The New York Times, and other publications. The Village Voice called it "A sweet, stealthy film about creating meaning in your life (and your work) in a relentlessly mercenary world. Off-handed and yet quite artfully observed, The Happy Poet's winsome deadpan offsets its skewering of class and sustainability issues, right through to a tricky ending that, like Bill himself, may not be what it seems." The Happy Poet won numerous prizes around the world, including the Audience Award at the Oldenburg International Film Festival, an American Independents Award at The Philadelphia International Film Festival and the Grand Jury Prize for Best Narrative Feature at the Florida Film Festival.

=== Lovers of Hate ===
In 2010, Ohlson served as a co-producer on Bryan Poyser's Lovers of Hate, which World Premiered at the 2010 Sundance Film Festival in the U.S. Dramatic Competition. Karina Longworth of LA Weekly dubbed it "the most exciting American indie I've seen in a while", and The New York Times called it "viciously amusing". The film was nominated for a John Cassavetes Independent Spirit Award.

=== Good Night ===
Ohlson also served as an executive producer on Good Night, starring Adriene Mishler, Jonny Mars, Alex Karpovsky and Chris Doubek. Good Night was called "lovely and devastating" by Indiewire, and Film Threat noted, "The true strength of Good Night is the top-notch ensemble cast. Throw Alex Karpovsky, Todd Berger, Newman and Chris Doubek into a room together and some sort of cinematic magic is going to happen; but there is also no doubt that it is the emotionally dynamic duo of Adriene Mishler and Jonny Mars who turn Good Night into something that is truly special. I might even say that Mishler and Mars clock in two of the greatest dramatic performances in the history of Austin filmmaking." Good Night had its World Premiere in 2013 at the SXSW Film Festival and is distributed by Devolver Digital.

=== Kumiko, the Treasure Hunter ===
Ohlson produced Kumiko, the Treasure Hunter, which made its world premiere on January 20, 2014, as part of the U.S. Dramatic Competition of the 2014 Sundance Film Festival. The film has gone on to screen at sold out venues at more than 30 festivals and markets around the world, including the 2014 Berlin International Film Festival, SXSW, Karlovy Vary, San Francisco and Sydney, among many others. Along the way, Kumiko has received a slew of awards, including a U.S. Dramatic Special Jury Award for Musical Score at Sundance, a Best Director Award at the 2014 Fantasia International Film Festival, a Screenwriting Award at the 2014 Nantucket Film Festival, and Audience Awards at both the Las Palmas (Spain) Film Festival and Little Rock Film Festival. The film was acquired by Amplify Releasing and will be released in 2015. Scott Foundas of Variety praised the film, saying "Our desire that life should be more like it is in the movies beats at the heart of Kumiko, the Treasure Hunter, a wonderfully strange and beguiling adventure." Rodrigo Perez of The Playlist wrote, "A kind of peculiar, intelligent fairy tale, the Zellner brothers magical Treasure Hunter leaves much to chew on... and much of this frosty and bracing expressionism will be a subjective experience. But either way, its ambiguity should dazzle and delight."

=== Thank You a Lot ===
Ohlson also produced Thank You a Lot, the first film from writer/director, Matt Muir. The film premiered at the 2014 South by Southwest Film Festival to strong reviews, and was released in June 2014 by Gravitas Ventures. "Starring the inimitable James Hand and spot-on Blake DeLong," The Austin Chronicle wrote, "this is a story of regret, pride, and love that will stick with you long after the house lights have come back up."

=== She's Never Coming Back ===
In 2022, Ohlson's short video She's Never Coming Back premiered at The Holy Art Gallery in London. It was later shown in Fluid Time at Independent & Image Art Space in China, and will be seen in Form 22 at the Czong Institute for Contemporary Art in Korea later this year.

=== The Man Who Plays With Fire ===
In 2022, Ohlson produced and directed The Man Who Plays With Fire, an expressionistic profile that follows James Beard-nominated chef Bryce Shuman, and the live fire he cooks with. The film premiered on NOWNESS in 2022.

== Filmography ==
Year	Film	Position
1999	824 (Video Short)	Director
2000	11th and Congress (Video Short)	Director
2002	I Love You (Short)	Director
2003	The Meat Market (Video Short)	Director
2004	The Spin Cycle (Short)	Director
2005	Cremains (Short)	Director
2006	My Electric Bill (Short)	Director
2006	Clock Paint Eyeball (Short)	Director
2006	Train (Video Short)	Director
2006	Trauma (Video Short)	Director
2008	American Teen	Production coordinator
2008	Expecting (Short)	Director
2008	Clean (Short)	Director
2009	The Overbrook Brothers	Producer
2010	The Happy Poet	Executive producer
2010	DMT: The Spirit Molecule	Line producer
2010	Remembering (Video Short)	Director
2010	Screaming (Short)	Director
2010	Lovers of Hate	Co-producer
2011	Blaze Foley: Duct Tape Messiah	Line producer
2013	Good Night	Executive producer
2014	Kumiko, the Treasure Hunter	Producer
2014	Thank You a Lot	Producer
2017	Mr. Roosevelt	Producer
2017	Yeah, So I've got This Searing Pain (Short)	Director
2018	Damsel	Executive producer
2021	She's Never Coming Back (Video Short)	Director
2021	Depressions of the Mind (Video Short)	Director
2021	This is where it happened. (Short)	Director
2022	The Ritual (Short)	Director
2022	The Day That I Drowned (Installation)	Director
2022	The Man Who Plays With Fire (Documentary Short)	Director
