= The Overbrook Brothers =

- Directed by: John E. Bryant
- Written by: John E. Bryant; Jason Foxworth
- Produced by: Tom Borders; Chris Ohlson; John E. Bryant
- Starring: Nathan Harlan; Mark Reeb; Laurel Whitsett
- Cinematography: Mike Washlesky
- Edited by: David Fabelo
- Release date: 2009
- Country: United States
- Language: English

The Overbrook Brothers is a 2009 comedy film directed by John E. Bryant. Co-written by Bryant and longtime friend Jason Foxworth, the film received its world premiere in the Narrative Competition at the SXSW Film Festival in 2009. Principal photography took place in the spring of 2008 for 3 1/2 weeks in various locations in Northern Colorado including Ft. Collins, and Idaho Springs. The remaining three weeks of principal photography took place in Austin, Texas, and surrounding towns.
