= The Happy Poet =

- Directed by: Paul Gordon
- Written by: Paul Gordon
- Produced by: Paul Gordon; David Hartstein
- Starring: Paul Gordon; Jonny Mars; Chris Doubek
- Cinematography: Lucas Millard
- Edited by: Paul Gordon
- Music by: Eric Friend
- Production company: St. Chris Film
- Distributed by: Cinema Libre Studio
- Release date: 2010
- Running time: 85 minutes
- Country: United States
- Language: English

The Happy Poet is a 2010 film written and directed by Paul Gordon. It was shot on-location in Austin, Texas, US. It has appeared at a number of film festivals, including the Venice Film Festival's Giornate Degli Autori ("Authors' Days") section.

== Cast ==
- Paul Gordon as Bill
- Jonny Mars as Donny
- Chris Doubek as Curtis
- Liz Fisher as Agnes
- Sam Wainwright Douglas as Buddy

== Film festivals ==
- Venice Film Festival 2010
- SXSW Film Festival 2010
- Traverse City Film Festival where it won the Fiction Jury Prize for Emerging Talent
- Oldenburg International Film Festival 2010, won the German Independence Award (Audience Award).
