= Suicide of Takako Konishi =

Japanese office worker

Takako Konishi (1973 – November 2001) was a Japanese office worker from Tokyo whose body was found by a bow hunter in a field outside Detroit Lakes, Minnesota on November 15, 2001. Konishi had originally arrived in Minneapolis earlier that month, traveled to Bismarck, North Dakota, then to Fargo, North Dakota and finally to Detroit Lakes, Minnesota where she died.

Her death was ruled a suicide, but some erroneous media stories at the time reported that she, under the mistaken impression that the 1996 film Fargo was based on a true story, had died trying to locate the money hidden by Steve Buscemi's character, Carl Showalter.

== Death ==
The Fargo theory surrounding Konishi's death resulted from a misunderstanding between Konishi and one of the Bismarck police officers with whom she had been speaking: Konishi reportedly kept repeating a word that sounded like "Fargo", while pointing at a drawing of a road and a tree. One officer, having seen the film, theorized that Konishi believed the buried money in the film was real, and they unsuccessfully attempted to explain this to Konishi, who remained undeterred. The story was then misreported by the media, leading to the urban legend that she had come to the United States to search for the money in the film.

In reality, Konishi had become depressed after losing her job at a Tokyo travel agency which went bankrupt; not only was she unable to find alternative employment, she also began consuming alcohol. It has been speculated that she came to Minneapolis because it was a place that she had previously visited with her former lover, a married American businessman whom she had met in Tokyo, but who had left her after taking another job in Singapore. Konishi was last seen wandering Detroit Lakes before her death. She apparently decided to die by suicide by lying down in the snow. It was also reported that she drank "two bottles of champagne"; however, although two empty bottles were allegedly "found near her body", postmortem examinations detected "no alcohol" in her bloodstream. While at least six different drugs were found in her system, including "sedatives, anti-convulsant drugs, tranquilizers and antipsychotics", these substances alone "weren't concentrated enough" to have caused her death, although they were "probably a contributing factor". An autopsy "found no sign of sexual assault" or trauma, and there was no evidence of an "overriding medical condition" that would have proven fatal. Although the coroner "was unable to determine the exact cause of her death", police investigators concluded that Konishi "was intending to commit suicide", and that "exposure to the cold" (perhaps exacerbated by drug intoxication) was the most plausible explanation.

The verdict of suicide was supported by the discovery that she had made a forty-minute phone call to her former lover in Singapore the previous night, had sent a suicide note to her parents expressing her intent to kill herself, and had disposed of most of the belongings she had brought with her to the United States before leaving Bismarck.

== Depiction in media ==
Konishi's story was detailed in the 2003 short documentary film This Is a True Story, directed by Paul Berczeller, in which she is portrayed by Mimi Ohmori. The urban legend surrounding her death is the basis for the 2014 film Kumiko, the Treasure Hunter. Konishi and the circumstances surrounding her death are the basis for Reel Bay: A Cinematic Essay by Jana Larson, published by Coffee House Press in 2021.
