= List of alternative hip-hop artists =

The following is a list of notable alternative hip hop artists.

== A ==
- Ab-Soul
- Kevin Abstract
- Abstract Rude
- Cisco Adler
- Aesop Rock
- Akrobatik
- Aminé
- Antipop Consortium
- Anybody Killa
- Armand Hammer
- Arrested Development
- A$AP Rocky
- Astronautalis
- Atmosphere
- Mickey Avalon

== B ==
- Baby Keem
- Backxwash
- Joey Badass
- Basehead
- Beans
- Beastie Boys
- Beat Junkies
- Big Boi
- Bishop Nehru
- The Black Eyed Peas
- Black Sheep
- Black Star
- Blackalicious
- Blackbear
- Blu & Exile
- B.o.B
- Brand Nubian
- Brockhampton
- Danny Brown
- Buck 65
- Busdriver
- Busta Rhymes
- Bruno Mars

== C ==
- Cadence Weapon
- Calle 13
- Cannibal Ox
- La Caution
- Chali 2na
- Chance the Rapper
- Che (rapper)
- Chiddy Bang
- Childish Gambino
- Cities Aviv
- Citizen King
- Clipping.
- Clouddead
- The Cool Kids
- Common
- Company Flow
- The Coup
- Crazy Town
- Denzel Curry
- Cypress Hill
- Czarface

== D ==
- Dälek
- Dan the Automator
- Danger Doom
- Danny!
- Dark Time Sunshine
- Das Racist
- Jean Dawson
- DC Talk
- De La Soul
- Dead Prez
- Death Grips
- Del the Funky Homosapien
- Deltron 3030
- Die Antwoord
- Digable Planets
- Digital Underground
- Dilated Peoples
- The Disposable Heroes of Hiphoprisy
- Divine Styler
- Doechii
- Dolphin
- Domo Genesis
- Doomtree
- Duckwrth

== E ==
- EarthGang
- Jay Electronica
- El-P
- Eliquate
- Elwood
- Epik High
- Eyedea
- Eyedea & Abilities

== F ==
- Flatbush Zombies
- Flipsyde
- Flobots
- Flying Lotus
- Fort Minor
- Sage Francis
- Freestyle Fellowship
- Fugees
- Fun Lovin' Criminals

== G ==
- G. Love & Special Sauce
- Gang Starr
- GDP
- Ghostemane
- Ghostpoet
- Freddie Gibbs
- The Goats
- Gnarls Barkley
- Gorillaz
- Jean Grae
- Grand Buffet
- CeeLo Green
- Greydon Square
- Grieves
- GRITS
- Gym Class Heroes

== H ==
- Handsome Boy Modeling School
- Jack Harlow
- Hector Bizerk
- Heems
- Hieroglyphics
- Ho99o9
- Hodgy Beats

== I ==
- Ill Bill
- Illslick
- Immortal Technique
- Injury Reserve
- Itch

== J ==
- J. Cole
- J Dilla
- Jamie T
- Jneiro Jarel
- JID
- JJ Doom
- JPEGMafia
- Juice Wrld
- Jungle Brothers
- Jurassic 5

== K ==
- Ka
- K.Flay
- Ken Carson
- Kid Cudi
- Kid Koala
- Kids See Ghosts
- Kidz in the Hall
- Killer Mike
- Allan Kingdom
- K'naan
- Rockwell Knuckles
- The Knux
- Kool Keith
- The Koreatown Oddity
- k-os
- Talib Kweli

== L ==
- Kendrick Lamar
- Latyrx
- Lil B
- Lil Peep
- Lil Ugly Mane
- Lil Uzi Vert
- Lucki
- Lil Yachty
- Little Brother
- Little Simz
- Lupe Fiasco
- Lyrics Born

== M ==
- Macklemore
- Macklemore & Ryan Lewis
- Madvillain
- Mansionz
- Matisyahu
- Travie McCoy
- Me Phi Me
- MellowHype
- MF Doom
- M.I.A.
- The Mighty Underdogs
- MIKE
- Mac Miller
- Milo
- Pete Miser
- Mos Def
- Mr. Lif
- Mr. Muthafuckin' eXquire
- Georgia Anne Muldrow
- Murs

== N ==
- Nappy Roots
- Native Tongues
- Navy Blue
- N.E.R.D
- No I.D.
- No Wyld
- Noname
- Nujabes

== O ==
- Odd Future
- OK Cobra
- One Block Radius
- Open Mike Eagle
- OsamaSon
- Organized Konfusion
- Outasight
- Outkast
- Oxymorrons

== P ==
- Anderson .Paak
- Pac Div
- Paris Texas
- People Under the Stairs
- Pete Rock & CL Smooth
- The Pharcyde
- Pharoahe Monch
- Playboi Carti
- P.M. Dawn
- P.O.S
- Post Malone
- Project Blowed

== Q ==
- Quasimoto
- Quelle Chris
- Questlove

== R ==
- Kojey Radical
- R.A.P. Ferreira
- Isaiah Rashad
- Ratking
- RDGLDGRN
- Redveil
- Reefer
- Rehab
- RJD2
- The Roots
- Run the Jewels

== S ==
- The Saturday Knights
- Sidhu Moose Wala
- Serengeti
- Shabazz Palaces
- Shad
- Shape Shifters
- Shwayze
- Sisyphus
- Slowthai
- Slug
- Smino
- Jaden Smith
- Rejjie Snow
- Sole
- Son Lux
- Souls of Mischief
- SoulStice
- Spank Rock
- Spearhead
- Speech
- Vince Staples
- Suicideboys
- Earl Sweatshirt

== T ==
- THEESatisfaction
- Themselves
- Theophilus London
- A Tribe Called Quest
- Trippie Redd
- TTC
- Twenty One Pilots
- Tyga
- Tyler, the Creator
- Teezo Touchdown

== U ==
- Ugly Duckling
- Us3

== W ==
- Gerald Walker
- C-Rayz Walz
- George Watsky
- Ohmega Watts
- Kanye West
- Westside Gunn
- Tierra Whack
- Why?
- will.i.am
- Saul Williams
- Yoni Wolf
- Billy Woods

== X ==
- XXXTentacion

== Y ==
- Yeat
- Young Fathers
- Young Thug

== Z ==
- zayALLCAPS
- Zebra Katz
- Zion I

== See also ==
- List of hip-hop musicians
- Category:Alternative hip-hop musicians
