= Don't Give Up =

Don't Give Up may refer to:

== Film ==
- Don't Give Up (film), a 1947 Swedish musical film

== Music ==
=== Albums ===
- Don't Give Up (album), a 2007 album by Serengeti & Polyphonic
- Don't Give Up, a 1981 album by Andraé Crouch
- "Don't Give Up", a 2014 album by Rick Seguso

=== Songs ===
- "Don't Give Up" (Chicane song), featuring Bryan Adams
- "Don't Give Up" (Island Inspirational All-Stars song), a song by Kirk Franklin, Hezekia Walker, Donald Lawrence, and Karen Clark Sheard
- "Don't Give Up" (Noisettes song)
- "Don't Give Up" (Peter Gabriel and Kate Bush song), covered by Shannon Noll and Natalie Bassingthwaighte
- "Don't Give Up" (Sanctus Real song)
- "You Are Loved (Don't Give Up)", a song by Josh Groban
- "Don't Give Up", by Basement Jaxx from Remedy
- "Don't Give Up", by Eagle-Eye Cherry from Sub Rosa
- "Don't Give Up", by Ira Losco from Butterfly
- "Don't Give Up", by Peter Andre from Angels & Demons
- "Don't Give Up", by Petula Clark from Petula
- "Don't Give Up", by Preeya Kalidas
- "Don't Give Up", by Survivor from Reach
- “Don't Give Up (On The Brink Of A Miracle)”, by Tammy Faye Bakker
- "Don't Give Up (Don't Let Go)", a song by H & Claire, B-side of the single "Half a Heart"
- "Don't Give Up", by Washed Out from Paracosm
- "Don't Give Up", by White Lion from Pride
- "Don't Give Up", by The Whitest Boy Alive from Dreams
- "Don't Give Up", a track from the soundtrack of the 2015 video game Undertale by Toby Fox

== See also ==
- Don't Give It Up (disambiguation)
