= Sisyphus (disambiguation) =

Sisyphus was the king of Corinth, punished in Tartarus by being cursed to roll a huge boulder up a hill in Greek mythology.

Sisyphus may also refer to:

== Places ==
- 1866 Sisyphus, an Apollo asteroid

== People ==
- Sisyphus of Pharsalus, a contemporary of Plato

== Arts, entertainment, and media ==
=== Literature ===
- Sisyphus (dialogue), a dialogue between Socrates and Sisyphus of Pharsalus, attributed to Plato
- The Myth of Sisyphus, an essay by Albert Camus

=== Music ===
- Sisyphus (hip hop group), a musical collaboration formerly known as S / S / S featuring Serengeti, Son Lux, and Sufjan Stevens
  - Sisyphus (album), their 2014 debut album
- Sisyphus, a 1971 album by Cold Blood
- Stone Of Sisyphus, an album by the American rock band Chicago
- "Sysyphus", an avant-garde piece of music from the Pink Floyd album Ummagumma
- "Sisyphus", a song by American singer-songwriter Andrew Bird from his album My Finest Work Yet
- "Sisyphus", a song by Scottish-American band Garbage from their 2025 album Let All That We Imagine Be the Light

=== Other arts, entertainment, and media ===
- Sisyphus (Titian), a 1548–1549 painting by Titian
- Sisyphus (film), a 1974 animated short film by Marcell Jankovics
- "The Myth of Sisyphus" (Fargo), a 2015 episode of the American television series Fargo
- Sisyphus: The Myth, a 2021 South Korean television series

== Other uses ==
- Sisyphus (beetle), a genus of dung beetles
- Český klub skeptiků Sisyfos, Czech Skeptics' Club
- Sisyphus effect, a method of cooling below temperatures predicted by Doppler Cooling in Atomic Physics
- Sisyphus Prime, a prime soul boss in the 2020 video game Ultrakill
