= The Animal Crackers =

American hip hop group

- Origin: Cincinnati, Ohio
- Genres: Hip hop
- Years active: 1995–present
- Labels: Manimal; Stereotype
- Members: Mike B Dirt Ru; King Smo djdq Casual T Nati Kid; Top Speed

The Animal Crackers are an American group of DJs, MCs and producers based in Cincinnati, Ohio.

== Biography ==
The group, originally just DJs, formed in the early nineties. The founding members of The Animal Crackers are Casual T (DJ/Producer/Engineer), King SMO (DJ/Producer), and The Cincinnati Kid (DJ/MC). As DJs, they first began in 1995 by playing out at local venues. They expanded the group by having Mike B (DJ) and DQ (DJ) both Cincinnati locals, join in, and a consistent growing fan base furthered their exposure.

By 1999, their fan base had grown so much that they were forced to play at a higher capacity venue. At the larger venue they began to perform live routines and hosted emcee battles. The Animal Crackers success grew rapidly in the music scene of Cincinnati during this time. They won the City Beat Cincinnati Entertainment Awards twice, and became Cincinnati Enquirer nominees. Upon recognition of those titles, Unseen (MC,) from Dayton, Oh and Dirty Ru (DJ/Producer/MC) from Connecticut joined the crew. The latest addition to the Animal Crackers is Topspeed (DJ) and extended family include; Mr. Dibbs, Nobody and Haiku.

The collective manage their own recording studio and label entitled Manimal Records, also based out of Cincinnati. They are involved with MC Paul Barman and legendary Bootsy Collins. The Animal Crackers have been official DJs for Scribble Jam since 2000, Scribble Jam is one of the most popular underground hip hop events of the year.

Their first releases include a break-record entitled "Animal Cracker Breaks Vol.1", on Stereotype Records (March 2001) and a studio recorded collection of live routines called "Just Add Water." Their second break-record entitled "Vanilla Hater Breaks" (July 2003) collectively ensures their taste in selection of samples. Solo projects include DQ's, "Where The Sidewalk Begins" and Casual T's "Random Xtract." Currently they are working on a second full-length album and several individual/group projects.

== Members ==
The Animal Crackers are a variety group consisting of turntablists, MC's, and producer based out of Cincinnati, Ohio. They began with just two members in the mid-1990s, and have since grown to become one of the most popular underground hip-hop collectives. Originally consisting of only three DJs they eventually added more extremely talented DJs and began a turntable group. Among the addition of new members, the Animal Crackers are the Official Scribble Jam DJs as well as doing side work for the famous Bootsy Collins.

According to the members, Casual T and Noah met through Noah's older brother and began the Crackers around 1996. Shortly after, King SMO, Mike B, Dq, and Dirty Ru joined. The newest member of the group is TopSpeed.

- Casual T: Casual T was born in Connecticut, raised in Nati (Cincinnati), and also attended school in Nati. He started DJing, mixing, playing drums, and producing around 1991. He has been engineering and producing for Bootsy Collins for the past five years. He has done engineering and artist development for Hi-tek for a couple of years as well.
- djdq: Dq was born and raised in Cincinnati, and began making music in 1994. He is also a member of the group Glue and works part-time as a pizza delivery guy to hold things down in between the two.
- Dirty Ru: Dirty Ru was born in Connecticut, raised in New Haven, and came to Cincinnati for college. He began writing in 1988, scratching and beat juggling in 1993, and making beats in 1997. He has also worked as an English tutor for the past nine years at the University of Cincinnati, and DJs clubs at night.
- King SMO: From Cincinnati.
- Mike B: From Cincinnati. Also works as a private investigator and Club DJ.
- The Nati Kid: From Cincinnati.
- Topspeed: Born and raised in Indianapolis.
- Extended Family includes EQ, Mr. Dibbs, Philly Phil, Haiku, Unseen, and others.
- Unseen: One of their former members, Unseen, died in 2006.

== Equipment ==
- Live: Mackie D2 mixer, 12s, CDJ-100 (sometimes), Vestax 05 or 07, Serato, Various FX pedals (which according to Casual T come from "uncle Bootsy's closet", as in Bootsy Collins.
- Studio: Pro Tools, MPC 2000xl & 2000, ASR-X, live drums and percussion, various keyboards and synths (including Alesis, Roland, Korg, Emu, Novation, and Waldorf), 12-track recorders, live instruments and musicians, and "anything that can make noise... oh yeah, Turntables."

== Discography ==
Albums

Date	Title	Label	Notes
2001, March	Animal Cracker Break Neck Vol. 1	Stereotype Records	This is primarily a break-beat record. This record was produced by Mr. Dibbs and NuGruv.
2001	Just Add Water		This is a collection of live routines
2003, July	Vanilla Hater Breaks		The follow-up break album to their first release.
2004	National Geoplastic	Manimal Records	This is, according to the Crackers, the second edition to their compositional albums. This is available as 12" Vinyl and CD.

EPs/Compilations/Other Appearances

- Return of the DJ vol. 4: Although misnamed on the record, Animal Crackers appeared on this record with a track called "Schwicky".
- Full One: With "Uh Oh!" ft. MC Paul Barman, Neyba Hood, and Nardo. Release date unknown.
- A slurry of mixtapes were recorded to complement the annual Scribble Jam hip hop festival.
- DJ Spooky, "Optometry (remix by Animal Crackers)" (2003)

Official DJs for Bootsy and Bootzilla Productions

The Crackers have become the Official DJs for Bootsy over time. The most recent contribution includes Casual T scratching over his new Christmas featuring Snoop Dogg called "Christmas is Forever" (on Shout Records).

== Awards and honors ==
- Cincinnati Entertainment Awards: 2000, 2002, 2003, and 2007.
- Cincinnati Magazine's "Best DJ's": 2004
- Others: Casual T won a handful of regional Vestax and Guitar Center battles in the past five years.

== Side projects ==
- Paul Barman: Tears of Joy is in the works, being produced by Casual T, and will be released on Manimal. He has also been on a handful on records including his own "Paullelujah" album, work with Deltron 3030 or Del the Funky Homosapien, Master Ace, MF Doom, and others.
- FamGemz: FamGemz is a collective group that Casual T is working with, producing, and DJing for. The release will be on Manimal.
- Khankrete: According to Casual T "will be the best thing I have done or been a part of".
- Casual T: "The Productor" solo record is quietly in the works.
- Glue: A trio that includes djdq, Adeem, and producer Maker, which have recently been added to Fat Beats Records. They have released three albums: Seconds Away, Sunset Lodge, and Catch as Catch Can.
- Dirty Ru: Dirty Ru has written, produced, recorded, and scratched on a solo project with a release date unknown. He has also been working on an all scratch project for years and years, but according to Ru "I'm a perfectionist and at this rate it may never be finished".
- Piakhan: Piakhan was with RCA when they did "Wide Open" and "Dopeman's Bitch". He was also on Reflection Eternal Son "Touch You".
- Other Projects: Casual T has thrown his beats into the several random skate videos, And1 DVDs, and others.

Tours

- The Animal Crackers have been consistently touring regionally for the past seven years, with a six-week your in early 2004 that took them out Test and up North.
- Casual T and MC Paul Barman did a few shows in Canada in the summer of 2006 with Barman's solo material. Famgemz and Piakhan have played several regional shows and opened locally in Cincinnati. Glue is continuously touring the States with a stint in Europe in the works.

== Bibliography ==
- Laurent. "Animalistic Behaviour, an Interview with the Animal Crackers." Spin Science. 19 September 2006
- Line Noiz. "Bio." Animal Crackers. Mannimal Records. 19 September 2006
- Martin, April L. "The Crackers are More Than Skin-Deep." Cincinnati CityBeat. 22 October 2003. 19 September 2006
- Personal E-Mail interview with Casual T, President of Manimal Records, Member of the Animal Crakers, and Engineer and Producer for Bootzilla Productions.
