= Ten (Clouddead album) =

Studio album by Clouddead
- Released: March 8, 2004
- Recorded: 2001–2003
- Genre: Hip hop
- Length: 56:58
- Label: Big Dada; Mush
- Producer: Odd Nosdam; Doseone; Why?

Clouddead chronology
Clouddead (2001)	Ten (2004)

Singles from Ten
- 1. "Dead Dogs Two" Released: 2004

Ten is the second and final album by American hip hop trio Clouddead. It was released on March 8, 2004 on Big Dada in the United Kingdom and on March 16, 2004 on Mush Records in the United States. "Dead Dogs Two" was released as a single from the album. The album peaked at number 17 on the UK Independent Albums Chart, as well as number 16 on the UK R&B Albums Chart.

== Critical reception ==
Professional ratings
Aggregate scores
Source	Rating
Metacritic	74/100
Review scores
Source	Rating
AllMusic	3.5/5 stars
The A.V. Club	favorable
CMJ New Music Report	favorable
The Guardian	3/5 stars
The Observer	4/5 stars
Pitchfork	7.8/10
PopMatters	mixed
Stylus Magazine	C+
The Telegraph	favorable
The Village Voice	unfavorable

At Metacritic, which assigns a weighted average score out of 100 to reviews from mainstream critics, Ten received an average score of 74, based on 22 reviews, indicating "generally favorable reviews".

Molloy Woodcraft of The Observer gave the album 4 stars out of 5, writing, "A mish-mash of odd found sounds, woozy synths and hip hop beats form a bed for a collective scattershot collage of musings on love, life and mortality". Ed Howard of Stylus Magazine said, "Having allowed hip-hop to fall pretty much entirely by the wayside, the trio has instead embraced the full strength of their abstract poetry and glitchy, junky, rock-informed musical landscapes." Chris Dahlen of Pitchfork gave the album a 7.8 out of 10, stating that "the strongest moments on Ten involve a sustain: sustained organ tones, long throbbing noises, stretches where the words trail off."

In February 2004, The Observer listed "Dead Dogs Two" as the "Song of the Month".

CMJ placed Ten at number 10 on the "Top 20 Albums of 2004" list. In 2015, Fact placed it at number 71 on the "100 Best Indie Hip-Hop Records of All Time" list.

== Track listing ==
No.	Title	Length
1.	"Pop Song"	5:47
2.	"The Keen Teen Skip"	5:19
3.	"Rhymer's Only Room"	2:23
4.	"The Velvet Ant"	2:49
5.	"Son of a Gun"	5:48
6.	"Rifle Eyes"	3:53
7.	"Dead Dogs Two"	3:59
8.	"3 Twenty"	3:01
9.	"Physics of a Unicycle"	4:16
10.	"Our Name"	5:46
Total length:		43:09

Limited edition bonus disc
No.	Title	Length
1.	"Dead Dogs Two"	4:13
2.	"Mulholland Instrumental"	2:46
3.	"Dead Dogs Two" (Boards of Canada Remix)	5:05
Total length:		12:05

== Personnel ==
Credits adapted from liner notes.

- Yoni Wolf (Why?) – vocals, production
- Adam Drucker (Doseone) – vocals, production
- David Madson (Odd Nosdam) – production
- Jel – additional contribution
- Jordan Dalrymple – additional contribution
- Josiah Wolf – additional contribution
- Robert Curcio – additional contribution

== Charts ==
Chart	Peak position
UK Independent Albums (OCC)	17
UK R&B Albums (OCC)	16
