= PMDF =

PMDF can refer to:

== People ==
- Tha Grimm Teachaz, PMDF (Prince Midnight Dark Force)

== Software ==
- PMDF, a Pascal version of MMDF, written for VAX/VMS, later marketed by Innosoft.

== Agencies ==
- Military Police (Brazil) - Policia Militar Distrito Federal
