= T.I.M.E. Soundtrack =

Studio album by Odd Nosdam
- Released: February 17, 2009
- Recorded: January 2007 – June 2007
- Studios: Burnco, Berkeley, California
- Genre: Instrumental hip-hop
- Length: 33:10
- Label: Anticon
- Producer: Odd Nosdam

Odd Nosdam chronology
Pretty Swell Explode (2008)	T.I.M.E. Soundtrack (2009)	Sisters (2016)

T.I.M.E. Soundtrack is a studio album by American hip-hop producer Odd Nosdam. It was released on Anticon in 2009. It peaked at number 19 on the Dusted Top 40 Radio Chart. The album was originally created for a 2007 Element Skateboards video, titled This Is My Element.

== Critical reception ==
Professional ratings
Review scores
Source	Rating
AllMusic	4.5/5 stars
East Bay Express	favorable
Electronic Musician	3.5/5
Pitchfork	7.8/10
PopMatters	6/10 stars
SLUG Magazine	favorable
The Stranger	favorable
XLR8R	8/10

Jason Lymangrover of AllMusic gave the album 4.5 stars out of 5, calling it Odd Nosdam's "most polished, tightest work." Ian Cohen of Pitchfork gave the album a 7.8 out of 10, saying: "While it's easy to imagine people pulling killer kick flips or whatever in your mind's eye while the album is playing, the music itself has enough forthrightness and inventiveness to be one of the year's most enjoyable, if low-key, surprises." Andrew Martin of PopMatters gave the album 6 stars out of 10, saying, "Nosdam captures a masterful mix of dusty hip-hop drums that never seem to relax and simplistic instrumental loops, which range from piano to reverbed guitar."

== Track listing ==
No.	Title	Length
1.	"Zone Coaster"	2:44
2.	"T.I.M.E. In"	1:00
3.	"Cop Crush"	0:40
4.	"We Bad Apples"	2:47
5.	"Trunk Bomb"	2:07
6.	"Top Rank"	5:08
7.	"Fly Mode"	3:02
8.	"Ethereal Slap"	4:25
9.	"Root Bark"	2:34
10.	"One for Dallas"	3:03
11.	"Root Loop"	0:15
12.	"Wig Smasher"	2:58
13.	"T.I.M.E. Out"	2:32
Total length:		33:10

== Personnel ==
Credits adapted from liner notes.

- Odd Nosdam – production, photography, design
- Jel – additional drum programming (1, 7, 9), additional sounds (1, 7, 9)
- George Horn – mastering
