= Mr. Dibbs =

American DJ and hip hop producer

- Born: Bradley Duane Forste; Cincinnati, Ohio, United States
- Genres: Turntablism, alternative hip hop
- Occupations: DJ, producer
- Instruments: Turntables, sampler
- Years active: 1990s–present
- Labels: Rhymesayers Entertainment, Self Core Records, Cease & Desist, Four Ways To Rock, Shake It!, Stereo-Type, Mary Joy, Puddles Frothingsquat
- Website: www.mrdibbs.com

Mr. Dibbs (born Bradley Duane Forste) is an American DJ and hip hop producer. He is the Founder of 1200 HOBOS [dj/graff collective]. He was also one of the founders of Scribble Jam.

== Early life ==
Born in Cincinnati, Ohio, Forste was introduced to DJing around 1985, when he saw Grandmaster Flash performing on the syndicated light news/entertainment show PM Magazine, but "didn't really understand what he did." After watching an MTV broadcast of Grand Mixer DXT performing with Herbie Hancock on the latter's 1983 single "Rockit," he learned the hand motions and began to learn scratching himself. He estimates that he spent six months "getting the hang of" scratching, subsequently spending two years "cutting and scratching to whatever was on TV" to practice.

== Career ==
Mr. Dibbs formed his own turntablist crew 1200 Hobos in the early 1990s. The crew's rotating line-up has included Doseone, Jel, Buck 65, Sixtoo, Adverse, DJ Signify, DJ Mayonnaise, DJ Skip among others, and at its largest numbered 23 members. They have released two mixtapes.

In addition to 1200 Hobos, Mr. Dibbs has also been touring DJ for Atmosphere and El-P. With Doseone and Jel, he is also a member of Presage, who released one album Outer Perimeter in 1998.

In 1996, Mr. Dibbs teamed up with graffiti magazine Scribble to put on the first Scribble Jam event as a promotion for the magazine's launch. The event has since become America's largest hip hop festival with separate competitions for rapping, DJing, graffiti, b-boying and beatboxing. Its past participants and guests have included Juice, Eminem, Adeem, P.E.A.C.E., Eyedea, Sage Francis, Mac Lethal, Rhymefest, Nocando, MF Doom, Skratch Bastid and DJ Abilities.

Mr. Dibbs' Turntable Hardcore series of albums was notable for its genre-straddling approach, blending a wide variety of styles along with more usual hip hop turntablism.

== Discography ==
=== Solo records ===
- Turntable Scientifics (Four Ways To Rock, 1995, CD reissue 1998)
- Live in Memphis (Stereo-Type, 2000)
- Primitive Tracks (Cease And Desist, 2000)
- Unearthed Vol. 1 (Cease And Desist, 2000)
- Unearthed Vol. 2 (Cease And Desist, 2000)
- Unearthed Vol. 3 (Cease And Desist, 2000)
- Abduction Of The Times 6.66 (Mary Joy, 2001)
- Random Vol. 1 (Puddles Frothingsquat, 2002)
- Random Vol. 2 (Puddles Frothingsquat, 2002)
- Random Vol. 3/Sad Clown Bad Dub 7 (2003)
- Outreach 5 (Rhymesayers Entertainment, 2003)
- The 30th Song (Rhymesayers Entertainment, 2003)
- Turntable Hardcore (Puddles Frothingsquat, 2003)
- Turntable Hardcore 2 (Puddles Frothingsquat, 2004)
- Ugly and Proud Vol. 1 (Shake It!, 2004)
- Ugly and Proud Vol. 2 (Shake It!, 2004)
- Ugly and Proud Vol. 3 (Shake It!, 2005)
- Eat Meat (2003)
- Eat Meat 2 (2007)
- ′′DeadWorld Reborn′′ (2012)
- "Below The Threshold" Single - [INIM E.G. 2023]
- "Analog Deprogramming At 476MHZ" Single - [INIM E.G. 2022] Habitat/Thrasher Magazine

=== Guest appearances ===
- Doseone - "Bronchial Cleansing" from Hemispheres (A Purple 100, 1998)
- Themselves - "John Brown's Vaporizer" from Them (Anticon, 1999)
- Cryptic Souls Crew, Man of the Year, Hot Rod Monster Jam, and Cold Chillin' Len's "You Can't Stop the Bum Rush" (Work, 1999)
- Peanut Butter Wolf - "Mr. Dibbs" from My Vinyl Weighs a Ton (Stones Throw Records, 1999)
- Greenthink - Blindfold (self-released, 1999)
- Why? / Odd Nosdam - "Untitled" from Split EP! (Anticon, 2001)
- Clouddead - "(Cloud Dead Number Five) (1)" "(Cloud Dead Number Five) (2)" from Clouddead (Mush Records/Big Dada, 2001)
- Felt - Felt: A Tribute to Christina Ricci (Rhymesayers Entertainment, 2002)
- Sage Francis - "Kill Ya' Momz" from Personal Journals (Anticon, 2002)
- Murs - "Dibbs Did This Shit (Interlude)" from The End of the Beginning (Definitive Jux, 2003)
- Suffocate Faster - "Death Becomes Her/Grinder feat. Mr. Dibbs" from "Only Time Will Tell" (Broken Sounds, 2004)
- Gym Class Heroes - "Papercuts (The Reason for the Lesions Remix by Mr. Dibbs)" from The Papercut Chronicles (Fueled by Ramen/Decaydance Records, 2005)
- Barfly - The Barfly Mix CD (Self Core Records, 2006)
- Terror - "Dibbs and Murs Check In" from Always the Hard Way (Trustkill Records, 2006)
- El-P - "Tasmanian Pain Coaster" "Smithereens" "Run the Numbers" "Habeas Corpses" from I'll Sleep When You're Dead (Definitive Jux, 2007)
- SMTDLR-Terra Infirma “Smutface The Phantom” “Public Service Announcement” 2020

=== Compilation & soundtrack appearances ===
- "Listen" with DJ Osiris on Ropeladder 12 (Mush Records, 2000)
- "Who's Listening?" "What Was It?" with Fat Jon on Tags of the Times 3 (Mary Joy Recordings, 2001)
- "Invitation to Hell" as Presage on Urban Revolutions (Future Primitive Sound, 2001)
- "Divine Spirit" on Suite for Weldon (Stones Throw, 2003)
- "Skin Therapy" on Tony Hawk's Underground (Activision, 2003)
- "Everything Burns, Everybody Bleeds"

=== Collaborations ===
- Isle EP (with E Makes Music, as A.P.S.O, 2018 and re-released 2023). The first track "Isle" features DJ T- Rock on The Outro Cuts.
- [INIM E.G. 2021] Mr. Dibbs & Brett Fullerton
- "Non Compos Mentis / Boule De Plongeon" [INIM E.G. 2022] Mr. Dibbs & Brett Fullerton
- "ALL THATS LEFT IS THE KNIFE" - Mr. Dibbs X N8NOFACE X BRAINABIDING Single [INIM E.G. 2023]

=== References ===
- Radio Feature Some Assembly Required interview with Mr. Dibbs (2007)
