= Plan 9... Meat Your Hypnotis. =

Studio album by Odd Nosdam
- Released: July 23, 1999
- Recorded: Cincinnati, Ohio
- Studio: bedroom
- Genres: Lo-fi, hip-hop
- Length: 70:38
- Label: self-released
- Producer: Odd Nosdam

Odd Nosdam chronology
Plan 9... Meat Your Hypnotis. (1999)	No More Wig for Ohio (2003)

Plan 9... Meat Your Hypnotis. is a lo-fi beat tape by American hip-hop producer Odd Nosdam. It was first released on hand assembled cassettes in 1999. an expanded version was reissued on CD and double vinyl by Mush Records in 2002. In 2019, a remastered reissue version of the album was released on cassette by Dome of Doom Records.

== Critical reception ==
Professional ratings
Review scores
Source	Rating
AllMusic	4/5 stars
Urban Smarts	favorable

Kingsley Marshall of AllMusic gave the album 4 stars out of 5, saying: "Though without much in the way of lyrical narrative, the battle of both form and function keeps things tense -- a barrage of bare sketches forged from a street knowledge and sense of the theatrical that inevitably holds court to more ideas than many fully formed albums from lesser rap draculas." According to XLR8R, the album "impacted 21st-century experimental music and laid the groundwork for the rise of cLOUDDEAD and Anticon Records."

== Track listing ==
1. Untitled - 1:25
2. Untitled - 0:14
3. Untitled - 1:45
4. Untitled - 0:47
5. Untitled - 1:36
6. Untitled - 0:44
7. Untitled - 0:49
8. Untitled - 1:00
9. Untitled - 0:53
10. Untitled - 1:52
11. Untitled - 1:15
12. Untitled - 0:29
13. Untitled - 0:56
14. Untitled - 0:45
15. Untitled - 1:45
16. Untitled - 2:33
17. Untitled - 0:42
18. Untitled - 0:52
19. Untitled - 1:37
20. Untitled - 1:26
21. Untitled - 1:38
22. Untitled - 1:11
23. Untitled - 1:52
24. Untitled - 0:47
25. Untitled - 1:43
26. Untitled - 1:29
27. Untitled - 1:48
28. Untitled - 1:47
29. Untitled - 1:15
30. Untitled - 1:22
31. Untitled - 0:42
32. Untitled - 1:39
33. Untitled - 1:44
34. Untitled - 0:48
35. Untitled - 1:48
36. Untitled - 0:50
37. Untitled - 2:34
38. Untitled - 0:28
39. Untitled - 1:27
40. Untitled - 0:36
41. Untitled - 1:39
42. Untitled - 1:24
43. Untitled - 1:19
44. Untitled - 0:40
45. Untitled - 1:24
46. Untitled - 0:45
47. Untitled - 2:41
48. Untitled - 2:10
49. Untitled - 1:21
50. Untitled - 0:32
51. Untitled - 0:25
52. Untitled - 2:08
53. Untitled - 0:55
54. Untitled - 0:55
55. Untitled - 1:22
