= Renee-Louise Carafice =

American singer-songwriter

Renee-Louise Carafice is a New Zealand-born experimental pop singer and songwriter. As of 2014, she was based in Nashville, Tennessee.

== Biography ==
Carafice was born and raised in New Zealand. In 2003, due to a severe bout of clinical depression, fears for her safety prompted the government of New Zealand to make her a ward of the state and place her in a mental institution in Auckland. Her recovery from this episode informed the recording of her debut album, Tells You to Fight. This album was recorded at Steve Albini's Electrical Audio studio in Chicago, Illinois and released in 2008 on the New Zealand independent label Monkey Records. In addition, she collaborated with rapper Serengeti and producer Tony Trimm in the group Yoome, which released the album The Boredom of Me in 2008. She also appeared on two tracks on Serengeti and Polyphonic's 2009 album Terradactyl.

While recording Tells You to Fight in Chicago, Carafice met the Nashville-based band Heavy Cream, who she eventually followed to move to Nashville. Her second album, I Will Raise a Bird Army, was released in September 2010. It was recorded at Hill Street Studios in Onehunga, New Zealand, and produced by Jamie Stewart in Chicago. The New Zealand Music Commission described this album as "starkly beautiful and gently disturbing". In 2011, she returned to New Zealand to support Sufjan Stevens. In 2013, Yoome released a 7" entitled "Tragedy of the War/Peaches and Pebbles" on the label Heardrums. The 7" contains two songs from their album June, which was also released that year.

Carafice's third album, Power Animals, was released in 2014 on her own label, Bird Army Records. It was written while she was receiving extensive hypnotherapy, and was originally released in an unfinished form in mid-2012. She later started a successful Kickstarter campaign that led to the album being re-recorded with the help of Daniel Tomczak. According to Carafice, "This album is an anti-suicide note: love songs to myself and hate songs to the haters. These songs say: I am alive, and perhaps being alive is more brutal than being dead."

== Discography ==
=== Solo ===
- Tells You to Fight (Monkey, 2008)
- I Will Raise a Bird Army (Bird Army, 2010)
- Power Animals (Bird Army, 2014)

=== With Yoome ===
- The Boredom of Me (Audio8, 2008)
- Tragedy of the War/Peaches and Pebbles (Heardrums 7", 2013)
