= This Is My Element =

- Directed by: Kirk Dianda; Johnny Schillereff
- Produced by: Johnny Schillereff; Mark Tinkess; David Brooks; Ryan Kingman; Jeff Dickson
- Starring: Darrell Stanton; Chad Muska; Chad Tim Tim; Tony Tave; Brent Atchley; Mike Vallely; Tosh Townend; Bam Margera; Nyjah Huston
- Cinematography: Craig Metzger
- Edited by: Kirk Dianda; Lee DuPont; Marc Falkenstein
- Music by: Odd Nosdam, Moistboyz
- Release date: 2007
- Running time: 80 minutes
- Language: English

This Is My Element is an Element skateboarding video. It was their 8th video, and was released and premiered on June 21, 2007, Go Skateboarding Day, at 100 locations in the U.S., 34 of them in California alone. It was highly anticipated, and features tricks performed at 350 worldwide locations. The list price for the video was $23.99.

== Content ==
This is My Element features appearances from over 20 people. The full parts are from most of Element's pro team, and from several of their rising amateurs. In chronological order-

- Nyjah Huston
- Chad Muska
- Brent Atchley
- Chad TimTim
- Justin Schulte
- Jimmy Lannon
- Bam Margera
- International Team
- Mike Barker
- Levi Brown
- Mike Vallely
- Bucky Lasek
- Collin Provost
- Tosh Townend
- Darrell Stanton
- Tony Tave

== Soundtrack ==
- Intro - Odd Nosdam - Time In
- Nyjah Huston - Odd Nosdam - Top Rank
- Chad Muska - Odd Nosdam - Trunk Bomb
- Brent Atchley - Odd Nosdam - Fly Mode
- Chad Tim Tim, Justin Schulte, Jimmy Lannon - Odd Nosdam - Ethereal Slap
- Bam Margera Intro - Odd Nosdam - Cop Crush
- Bam Margera - Moistboyz - The Tweaker
- International Team - Odd Nosdam - Zone Coaster
- Mike Barker - Odd Nosdam - Root Bark
- Levi Brown - Odd Nosdam - One For Dallas
- Mike Vallely, Chris Senn, Bucky Lasek - Odd Nosdam - We Bad Apples
- Collin Provost - Odd Nosdam - Rocker Fit
- Tosh Townend - Odd Nosdam - Shut This Down
- Darrell Stanton - Odd Nosdam - D's Chamber
- Tony Tave - Odd Nosdam - Wig Smasher
- Credits - Odd Nosdam - Time Out
