= Kenny Dennis LP =

Kenny Dennis

Studio album by Serengeti
- Released: June 25, 2013
- Genre: Hip-hop
- Length: 31:10
- Label: Anticon
- Producer: Odd Nosdam

Serengeti chronology
Saal (2013)	Kenny Dennis (2013)	Kenny Dennis III (2014)

Kenny Dennis LP is a studio album by American rapper Serengeti. It was released on Anticon on June 25, 2013.

== Critical reception ==
Professional ratings
Aggregate scores
Source	Rating
Metacritic	80/100
Review scores
Source	Rating
AllMusic	4/5 stars
Christgau's Consumer Guide	A−
Consequence of Sound	C+
Paste	8.1/10
Pitchfork	7.8/10

At Metacritic, which assigns a weighted average score out of 100 to reviews from mainstream critics, the album received an average score of 80, based on 10 reviews, indicating "generally favorable reviews".

Jason Lymangrover of AllMusic described Odd Nosdam's production as "a top-shelf blend of golden age and futuristic beats". Jon Hadusek of Consequence of Sound said, "there’s really no better album to start the KD saga with; producer Odd Nosdam's wobbling, jazzy beats give the record a laid-back cohesion, and Serengeti sounds as tight as ever."

Spin included it on the "40 Best Hip-Hop Albums of 2013" list.

== Track listing ==
No.	Title	Length
1.	"Bang Em"	3:20
2.	"Punks"	2:55
3.	"Laser Tag"	1:28
4.	"Directions"	3:39
5.	"Crush Em"	3:18
6.	"Gt Show '93"	1:41
7.	"Kenny and Jueles"	3:12
8.	"Fireworks"	1:53
9.	"West of Western"	4:25
10.	"50th Birthday"	4:14
11.	"Flows"	3:05

== Personnel ==
Credits adapted from liner notes.

- Serengeti – vocals
- Anders Holm – vocals
- Odd Nosdam – production
- Jel – turntables
- Daddy Kev – mastering
- Silas – artwork
