= Saal (album) =

2013 album by Serengeti

Studio album by Serengeti
- Released: February 12, 2013
- Studios: Bonn, Germany
- Genre: Hip-hop
- Length: 27:53
- Label: Graveface Records
- Producer: Sicker Man

Serengeti chronology
C.A.R. (2012)	Saal (2013)	Kenny Dennis LP (2013)

Saal is a studio album by American rapper Serengeti. It was released on Graveface Records in 2013. Entirely produced by Sicker Man, the album was recorded in Bonn, Germany. The title of the album comes from the German word for "room".

== Critical reception ==
Professional ratings
Review scores
Source	Rating
Christgau's Consumer Guide	(2-star Honorable Mention)
Pitchfork	6.3/10
Potholes in My Blog	4/5 stars
Spin	7/10

Mosi Reeves of Spin gave the album a 7 out of 10, saying, "Saal is an unexpectedly downbeat chapter in an increasingly impressive discography that will likely go unappreciated until years from now, when the world is better prepared for this Randy Newman-like bard and his ruminations on our mortal coil." Jonah Bromwich of Pitchfork gave the album a 6.3 out of 10, calling it "serious, overstated, and unavoidably heavy."

Impose included it on the "Best Albums of 2013" list.

== Track listing ==
No.	Title	Length
1.	"Karate"	3:10
2.	"Seasons"	2:37
3.	"Accommodating"	3:26
4.	"Day by Day"	2:57
5.	"Glassell Park"	2:33
6.	"Wedding"	3:11
7.	"I Could Redo"	3:22
8.	"Erotic City"	4:02
9.	"All the Time" (CD edition bonus track)	2:35

== Personnel ==
Credits adapted from liner notes.

- Serengeti – vocals, zither, percussion
- Sicker Man – cello, guitar, synthesizer, analog effects, production
- Kiki Bohemia – additional vocals (1)
- Ryan McCardle – artwork, design, photography
