= Badlands (Swedish musical act) =

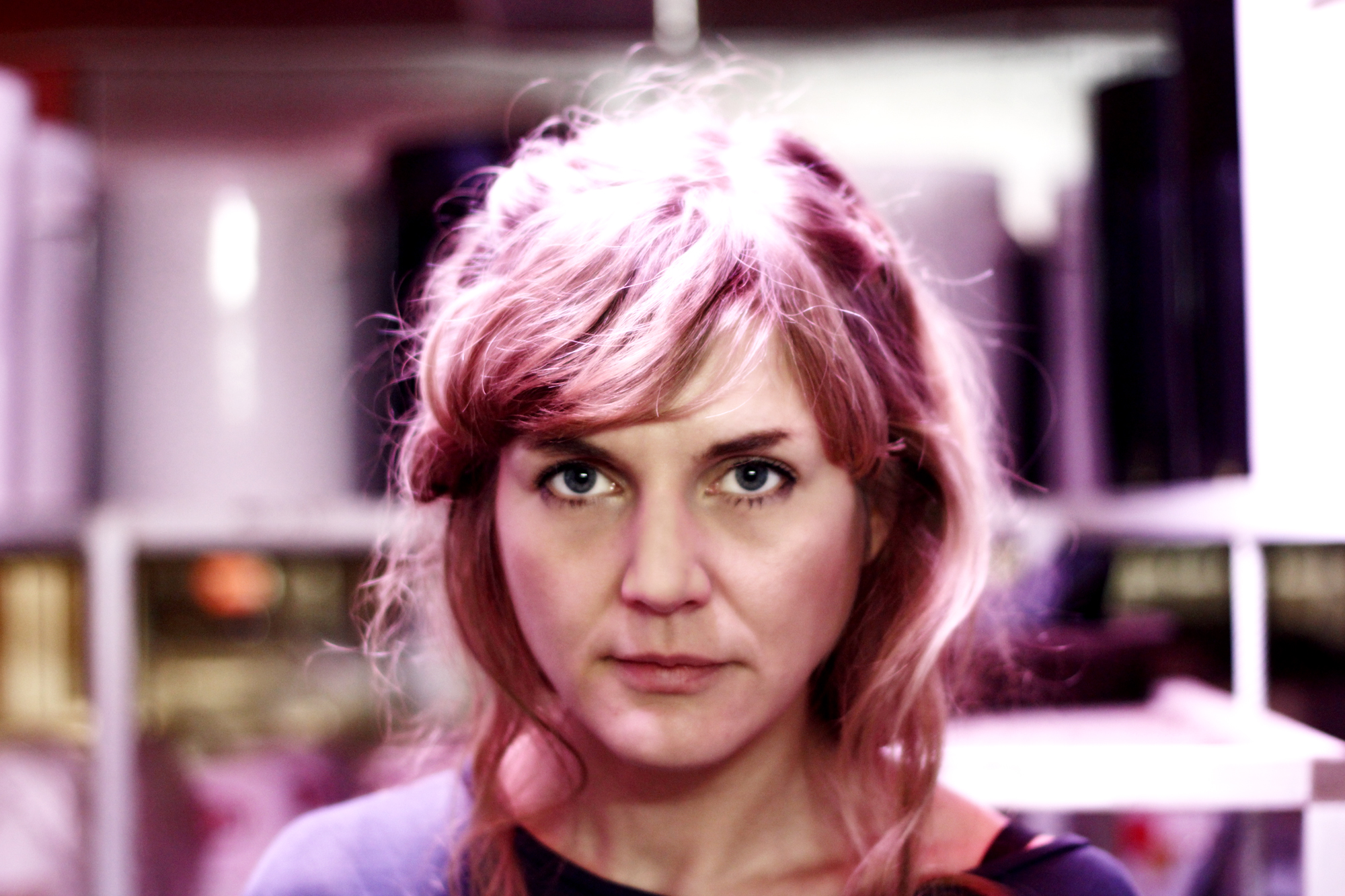

Background information
- Origin: Stockholm, Sweden
- Genre: New Wave IDM Folk Electronica Post punk Experimental Shoegaze Trip hop
- Years active: 2011 - present
- Labels: Temporary Secretary, RITE
- Members: Catharina Jaunviksna

Badlands is the musical solo name used by producer, composer, documentarist and sound designer Catharina Jaunviksna. With a wide inspirational range from post punk to warehouse techno-like ambiences, she makes tracks rooted in vintage electronics, gritty pedal work, samples and organic orchestration.

Jaunviksna started to explore analog midi and sampling as a teenager, finding a musical sanctuary in her own electronic compositions. Merging from music to sound design, she attended the sound design program at the reputable National Film School of Denmark 2009–2011, but became the educations first dropout due to her constant longing to make music. She then formed Badlands as a home for her new electroacoustic fusions with vocals and released first Badlands EP Battles Within (2012), followed by album Locus (2016). Acclaimed album Djinn was released in 2021 as a memorial to her late mother. November 18, 2022 Badlands released her third studio album Call to Love followed by a remix package in 2023, Call to Love: Rendered, with contributing artists such as Ikonika, Art Feynman, Cooly G and Odd Nosdam among others. 10th of October 2025 her 4th studio album "Nobody Dies" saw the light of day; a 13 track epic reflecting on music's role in human identity amid modern challenges.

The DIY approach is crucial to the distinct Badlands sound, where Jaunviksna exclusively writes, records, produces and mixes all material. She is the founder of the record label, arts platform and production company RITE based in Malmö, Sweden, from where she also makes transboundary arts and documentaries, original music and sound designs for film and theater, as well as production, remixes and mix work for other labels and artists.

== Discography ==
=== Albums ===
- Nobody Dies (2025)
- Call to Love: Rendered (remix package & bonus tracks, 2023)
- Call to Love (2022)
- Djinn (2021)
- Locus (2016)

=== Singles ===
- The Dead - album focus track (2025)
- Faint Birds (2025)
- Nobody Dies - album title track (2025)
- The Sun (2025)
- Let You Fall Asleep (2025)
- Ack E45 (2024)
- I Want Blood (2022)
- Bury You Whole (2022)
- My Time Will Come Again (2022)
- Lunatique (Stereo Total cover for Kill Rock Stars, 2021)
- Out of Reach (2021)
- Southbound Call (2021)
- Hearts featuring J. Cowhie (remastered album version, 2020)
- Hearts (2019)
- Echo (2016)
- Caramisou (2016)
- Tutu (2013)
- Never Dry Out (2012)

=== EP ===
- Nightmares Daymares (double track/EP, 2026)
- Cirkeln Remixed (remix version of EP "Cirkeln" by artist Fia, 2023)
- Fantasma I / Fantasma II (double single/EP, 2020)
- Battles Within (released as a duo together with Niklas Tjäder, EP, 2012)
