= Adeem (rapper) =

American rapper (born 1978)

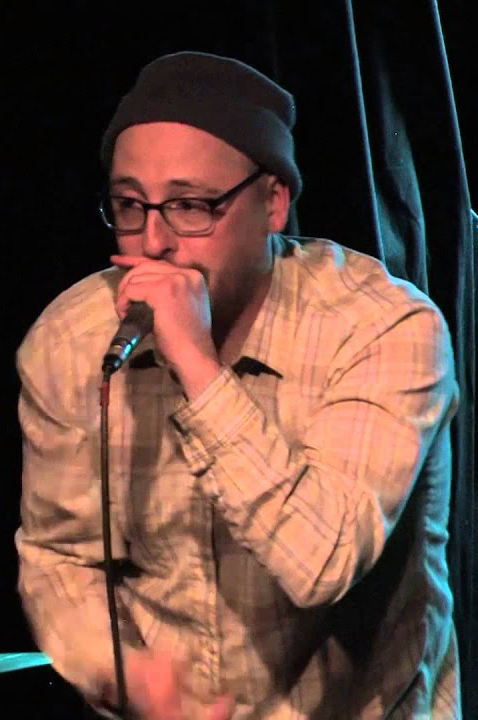

Background information
- Born: Adam Arnone; 1978 (age 47–48)
- Origin: Keene, New Hampshire, U.S.
- Genre: Hip hop
- Occupation: Rapper
- Years active: 1994–present
- Labels: ECHO FINCH; Winners Never Sleep; Fat Beats; Shake-It; Childproof; Ramona
- Formerly of: Glue
- Website: echofinch.com

Adam Arnone (born 1978), better known by his stage name Adeem (pronounced "A-D-M" and sometimes styled ADeeM), is an American rapper. He is best known for his work in the hip hop group Glue and for winning the Scribble Jam Emcee Battle in 1998 and 2001. He is also the owner of ECHO FINCH, a creative agency and music label.

== Early life ==
Adeem began rapping at age 15, when he started a group called Mellow Minds with a pair of local rappers in Keene, New Hampshire. The group appeared on Keene State College Radio from 1994 to 1996, where Adeem began to freestyle. In 1996, Adeem met DJ MF Shalem, and the two began working on routines and choreographing a live set.

== Career ==
In 1998, during a trip to Portland, Maine, rapper Sole convinced Adeem to attend Scribble Jam to perform with his group, The Live Poets. Adeem did not intend to participate in the emcee battle that year, but his friends registered him to compete anyway. After eliminating Atmosphere's Slug in the final round, Adeem won the Emcee Battle— it was his first victory in an organized competition. The day after the battle, Mr. Dibbs expanded the 1200 Hobos DJ Crew to include emcees; Adeem was invited to the crew along with Buck 65, Sixtoo, Slug, Doseone, Eyedea, Adverse, Sole, and Alias. Although the crew did not release any projects as a collective, Adeem claimed membership in the group for many years.

In late 1998, Adeem met Sage Francis at an open mic event in Providence, Rhode Island. The two artists collaborated and played shows together for a few years afterwards. In 1999, Adeem and Sage flew to Halifax, Nova Scotia, and recorded a 30-minute song with Buck 65 and Sixtoo, which became known as "The Untitled Canadian Recordings". During this time, Adeem and Sage collaborated with Sole and Alias to produce "I'm Afraid", which was released on Sage Francis' Sick of Waiting... in 1999.

Later in 1999 Adeem and DJ MF Shalem recorded their first album, The First Few Inches, on cassette tape. The album, almost exclusively produced by Shalem, was individually dubbed, and all inserts were cut by hand. The album featured a guest verse by Adverse, who joined Adeem and Shalem in 2000 to create a group called The Dorian Three. In the following years, The Dorian Three produced two albums and toured nationally.

During the summer of 2001, Adeem finished his first solo album, Sweet Talking Your Brain. The album was produced by the Vinyl Monkeys (MF Shalem, The Eclectic, Elektro4, Scott Matelic, Moodswing9, DJ Mayonnaise, Maker) and was self-released in the fall of 2001. The album was later licensed by Syntax Records in the US and by Tri Eight Records in Japan in 2002. Tri Eight subsequently pressed a 12-inch single with the tracks "Sweet Talk", "Forgotten Habit", and "Stargazing".

Adeem entered the emcee battle at Scribble Jam again in 2001. He won by defeating battle heavyweights like Sage Francis, Blueprint, and Mac Lethal. At the time, nobody had ever won the emcee battle more than once in the history of the hip-hop festival. Because his longtime partner, DJ MF Shalem, was occupied as Sage Francis' tour DJ, Adeem connected with DJ DQ with the intent to create a touring act. At approximately this time, Maker, a producer from Them Badd Apples in Chicago, sent Adeem a collection of beats over which to rap. After successful projects with both DJ DQ and Maker, the trio decided to visit Maker in Aurora, Illinois, to create a touring act. The group, originally called Seconds Away, ultimately became Glue.

In 2003, Adeem was chosen to compete in an emcee battle on Last Call with Carson Daly. He finished in second place, behind Breez Evahflowin. The final battle lasted two rounds, only one of which was aired by NBC.

In 2004, Glue released its first album, Seconds Away, to critical success from trade publications and the blogosphere. That summer, Glue was asked to play at the Warped Tour with a set at every show that summer.

Catch as Catch Can was ultimately released on September 16, 2006, to critical acclaim; almost 10,000 copies of the album were sold worldwide. Glue supported the album with three coast-to-coast tours between 2006 and 2007, playing with acts like Solillaquists of Sound, X:144 & SPS, and Hangar 18. In January 2008, MTV2 featured Glue on its On the Rise program, highlighting the group as an innovative, new hip-hop group from Chicago. The group toured briefly in 2008 but decided to take a break before working on its next album.

The Volume in the Ground, released in May 2011, featured collaboration with DJ MF Shalem, Maker, Chadeo, and Nobs. Adeem recorded vocals in Orlando, Florida, with Solillaquists of Sound members Swamburger and Alexandrah. The album was released, DIY, on Winners Never Sleep Records.

In early 2011, Adeem and DJ MF Shalem began working on a follow-up to their 2004 album. Titled Made in New Hampshire, it was released on November 13, 2012.

Adam's follow up album to Volume in the Ground came in the form of a complete redesign of his process. He enlisted the help of musicians Jentri Jollimore, Chris Beam, Mike Chadhina, and Ben Rogers to create a new sound based on the direction he started on Volume in the Ground. These sessions became Move Toward Life. Mostly improvised or written on the spot, Ben Rogers at Loud Sun Studio would capture everything in his underground basement studio. The album took the form of a rockabilly/blues/rap three headed monster. Shortly after the album was completed Adam's mother unexpectedly died tragically. While grieving and adjusting to a new reality he set aside the name Adeem and started Adam and the Flood. New beginnings for new days. As a dedication to his mother Adam added the intro Nancy Lives to Move Toward Life. The song was made from recordings found on his mother's phone. Shortly after the release of the album the Flood expanded to include musicians Josh Blair, Walker Landis, Justin Gregory, and Jon Brought. In 2019 The group would go on to record one ep together named Never Alone at Loud Sun Studios.

In 2020 as the pandemic hit, Adam found himself separated from the group and focusing on production. The result of those months in solitude with his family was the album COPE pt 1 and 2. It's the first album where Adam handled all production and vocals. It was mixed by the legendary Mark “DJ EXIT” Goodchild.

In 2021 as a result of the pandemic and his new found love for producing, Adam started ECHO FINCH. A creative agency focusing on licensing music and scoring content. It also serves as a record label. Home to Rain, Modern Fools, Adam and the Flood, and Herr.

== Personal life ==
As of 2011, Adeem lived in Peterborough, New Hampshire, with his wife and daughter.

== Discography ==
Adam and the Flood

- Move Toward Life (Nancy Lives! Records, 2017)
- Never Alone (Nancy Lives! Records, 2019)
- COPE pts 1 and 2 (Echo Finch, 2020)

Adeem

- Sweet Talking Your Brain (Syntax/Tri-Eight Records, 2002)
- The Volume in the Ground (Winners Never Sleep Records, 2011)

Adeem & Shalem

- The First Few Inches (Childproof Records, 1999)
- Transitions (Shake It Records, 2004)
- Made in New Hampshire (Childproof Records, 2011)

The Dorian Three (Adeem with Adverse & Shalem)

- The Dorian Three (Childproof Records, 2000)
- Down World, Up Songs (Childproof Records, 2004)

Glue (Adeem with Maker & DJ DQ)

- Seconds Away (Ramona Records, 2003)
- Sunset Lodge (Shake It Records, 2005)
- Catch as Catch Can (Fat Beats Records, 2006)

Guest appearances

- Passage & The Bomarr Monk - "Resonance" from Moods & Symptoms (2000)
- Sixtoo - "The Canada Project" from Songs I Hate (And Other People Moments) (2001)
- Sole - "Lyrically Able" from Learning to Walk (2002)
- Deeskee - "Joy 2 the World" from Lovingly Fragmented Memories of Deeskee (2002)
- Wordz - "Weekend" from You Haven't Heard Me Yet (2003)
- Maker - "Jumpin Lily" from Honestly (2003)
- Qwel - "Live Outro" from Stone Soup (2005)
- Playdough - "Jon Bon Iver" from Writer Dye: Deux or Die (2012)
- Qwel & Maker - "En Garde (Remix)" from Beautiful EP (2013)
- Figure - "Check My Movements" from Gravity (2015)
- Pine Grove - "4:3" from When We Meet Again (2016)
- Oldeaf “Ada” from Smile (2016)
- Seez Mics “Float Away” from With (2017)
- Tomy Wealth “Liberty” from Prey (2018)
- Bluesleep “Cavalier” from I'm going for your soul....10 years on (2019)
- Inspiration “Mentor and Protege” from The Journey Has Just Begun (2020)
- Maker “Summer Streets” from Sights Unseen (2020)
- Eyenine “Old & Bitter” from A Little Above Low Key (2021)
