= Level Live Wires =

Studio album by Odd Nosdam
- Released: August 28, 2007
- Genre: Hip-hop
- Length: 39:48
- Label: Anticon
- Producer: Odd Nosdam

Odd Nosdam chronology
Burner (2005)	Level Live Wires (2007)	Pretty Swell Explode (2008)

Level Live Wires is a studio album by American hip-hop producer Odd Nosdam. It was released on Anticon in 2007. It peaked at number 14 on the Dusted Top 40 Radio Chart in 2007.

== Critical reception ==
Professional ratings
Aggregate scores
Source	Rating
Metacritic	79/100
Review scores
Source	Rating
AllMusic	4/5 stars
East Bay Express	favorable
Filter	87/100
Pitchfork	7.0/10
PopMatters	8/10 stars
Spin	3/5 stars
Stylus Magazine	B
URB	3/5 stars
XLR8R	favorable

At Metacritic, which assigns a weighted average score out of 100 to reviews from mainstream critics, the album received an average score of 79, based on 12 reviews, indicating "generally favorable reviews".

Jo-Ann Greene of AllMusic gave the album 4 stars out of 5, saying: "From blurry dub and chill to doom-laden pieces, ambient sweetness to street noise effects, Nosdam's sounds and samples swirl round and round, coalescing into ever more surprising aural shapes and moods." Joshua Love of Pitchfork gave the album a 7.0 out of 10, calling it "a tightly constructed soundscape that hangs together more cogently than anything he's conceived to date."

== Track listing ==
No.	Title	Length
1.	"On"	0:58
2.	"Kill Tone"	5:10
3.	"We Dead"	1:21
4.	"Freakout 3"	4:05
5.	"Fat Hooks"	5:46
6.	"Blast"	1:49
7.	"The Kill Tone Two"	4:54
8.	"Burner"	5:50
9.	"Up in Flames"	4:54
10.	"Slight Return"	1:58
11.	"Off"	3:16
Total length:		39:48

== Personnel ==
Credits adapted from liner notes.

- Odd Nosdam – everything else
- Dee Kesler – keyboards (2, 7), guitar (2, 7), autoharp (6), noise (9)
- Jel – drums (2, 7, 9)
- Doug McDiarmid – piano (2, 9)
- Josiah Wolf – bass guitar (4, 8)
- Chris Adams – keyboards (4), vocals (4, 8) violin (8), guitar (8)
- Jessica Bailiff – vocals (5)
- Hilde Bialach – cello (6)
- Cosmos Lee – violin (7)
- Yoni Wolf – vocals (7)
- Tunde Adebimpe – vocals (7)
- Antimatter – mastering
