= Kenny Dennis III =

Studio album by Serengeti
- Released: November 11, 2014
- Genre: Hip hop
- Length: 46:48
- Label: Joyful Noise Recordings
- Producer: Odd Nosdam

Serengeti chronology
Kenny Dennis LP (2013)	Kenny Dennis III (2014)	Kaleidoscope (2016)

Kenny Dennis III is a studio album by American rapper Serengeti. It was released on Joyful Noise Recordings on November 11, 2014.

== Critical reception ==
Professional ratings
Review scores
Source	Rating
AllMusic	4/5 stars
Christgau's Consumer Guide	(1-star Honorable Mention)
Pitchfork	7.9/10
PopMatters	5/10 stars
Wondering Sound	4/5 stars

David Jeffries of AllMusic says, "more than any of the earlier releases, it draws upon Chicago blues and other American roots music for its beats."

Spin included it on the "40 Best Hip-Hop Albums of 2014" list. Rolling Stone placed it at number 28 on the "40 Best Rap Albums of 2014" list.

== Track listing ==
No.	Title	Length
1.	"No Beginner"	2:43
2.	"Off/On"	4:04
3.	"Shidoshi"	3:55
4.	"Win Big"	1:11
5.	"Perfecto"	1:16
6.	"On the Road"	1:08
7.	"@ the Mall"	1:47
8.	"Buddy Guy"	2:22
9.	"Tanya T"	3:11
10.	"Damn Dz"	2:32
11.	"Big Betty"	2:27
12.	"Dz Goes On"	3:54
13.	"Mr. Drummond"	2:10
14.	"Ain't No Joke"	0:59
15.	"Get Back to Rap"	0:26
16.	"Parkour"	2:26
17.	"Lose Big"	3:51
18.	"Need Clarity"	2:02
19.	"Tickled Pink"	4:24

== Personnel ==
Credits adapted from liner notes.

- Serengeti – vocals
- Joji Kojima – vocals (2, 3, 11, 12, 18)
- Anders Holm – vocals (4, 5, 6, 7, 13, 14, 15, 16)
- Jel – drums (10), vocals (13, 16), turntables
- D.A. Fisher – guitar (12)
- Robert Brooks – cello (19)
- Odd Nosdam – production, arrangement, mixing
- Daddy Kev – mastering
- Silas – painting
- David Woodruff – layout

== Charts ==
Chart	Peak position
US Alternative Albums (Billboard)	25
US Heatseekers Albums (Billboard)	7
US Independent Albums (Billboard)	42
US Top R&B/Hip-Hop Albums (Billboard)	36
US Rap Albums (Billboard)	23
