= C.A.R. (album) =

Studio album by Serengeti
- Released: July 31, 2012
- Recorded: 2009–2011
- Studios: Burnco, Berkeley, California
- Genre: Hip-hop
- Length: 29:32
- Label: Anticon
- Producers: Jel, Odd Nosdam, Yoni Wolf

Serengeti chronology
Family & Friends (2011)	C.A.R. (2012)	Saal (2013)

C.A.R. is a studio album by American rapper Serengeti. It was released on Anticon in 2012. Music videos were created for "Amnesia" and "Peekaboo".

== Critical reception ==
Professional ratings
Aggregate scores
Source	Rating
Metacritic	78/100
Review scores
Source	Rating
Alarm	favorable
Christgau's Consumer Guide	A−
CMJ	favorable
Consequence of Sound	C+
The Phoenix	3.5/4 stars
Pitchfork	7.6/10
Rolling Stone	3.5/5 stars
The Skinny	4/5 stars
Spin	8/10

At Metacritic, which assigns a weighted average score out of 100 to reviews from mainstream critics, the album received an average score of 78, based on 8 reviews, indicating "generally favorable reviews".

Bram Gieben of The Skinny gave the album 4 out of 5 stars, describing it as "a deliciously loose and accessible album from the awkward artistic leaders of the US underground hip-hop scene." He added: "Neither a challenging nor particularly groundbreaking record, it's still enormously satisfying." Jonah Bromwich of Pitchfork gave the album a 7.6 out of 10, saying, "C.A.R. is an excellent, devastating record, a chronicle of the amiable pessimism and occasional nihilism of a rapping Bukowski who can't seem to find a way out of the condition in which he finds himself."

Thomas Quinlan of Exclaim! placed it at number 6 on the "Top 10 Albums of 2012" list.

== Track listing ==
No.	Title	Length
1.	"Greyhound"	2:30
2.	"Talk to Me"	2:42
3.	"Nice"	2:23
4.	"Amnesia"	1:44
5.	"Geti Life"	3:10
6.	"Peekaboo"	2:37
7.	"Go Dancin"	4:09
8.	"Cold"	2:45
9.	"Say What?"	0:43
10.	"Chill"	3:41
11.	"Uncle Traum"	3:07

== Personnel ==
Credits adapted from liner notes.

- Serengeti – vocals
- Odd Nosdam – production, mixing
- Jel – vocals (3), turntables, production
- Yoni Wolf – vocals (5), guitar (5), bass guitar (5), blocks (5), co-production (5)
- Dee Kesler – vocals (7), guitar (7)
- Armando Perez – vocals (7)
- Daddy Kev – mastering
- Jesselisa Moretti – design
- Chloe Aftel – photography
