= Clouddead (album) =

Studio album by Clouddead
- Released: May 1, 2001
- Recorded: 1999–2000
- Genre: Alternative hip hop; abstract hip hop; psychedelic hip hop; cloud rap; illbient
- Length: 73:35
- Label: Big Dada; Mush
- Producer: Odd Nosdam

Clouddead chronology
Clouddead (2001)	Ten (2004)

Singles from Clouddead
- 1. "Apt. A" Released: 2000; 2. "And All You Can Do Is Laugh." Released: 2000; 3. "I Promise Never to Get Paint on My Glasses Again." Released: 2001; 4. "JimmyBreeze" Released: 2001; 5. "(Cloud Dead Number Five)" Released: 2001; 6. "Bike" Released: 2001

Clouddead (stylized as cLOUDDEAD) is the debut album by American hip hop trio Clouddead. It was released on May 1, 2001 on Big Dada in the United Kingdom and on May 8, 2001 on Mush Records in the United States. It features guest appearances from Illogic, DJ Signify, Sole, the Wolf Bros., Mr. Dibbs, and the Bay Area Animals.

== Critical reception and legacy ==
Professional ratings
Review scores
Source	Rating
AllMusic	4/5 stars
The Guardian	4/5 stars
NME	8/10
Pitchfork	8.0/10
Stylus Magazine	A
Tiny Mix Tapes	5/5

Stevie Chick of NME wrote, "This music takes the most abstract fallout of trip-hop as its starting point, working in white noise, telephone pranks and post-rock textures to create a disorientating mush you'll spend weeks getting lost in." Thomas Quinlan of Exclaim! stated that "Clouddead follows more along the lines of Frank Zappa or Captain Beefheart than it does hip-hop, but it remains rooted at all times in beats and samples."

Clay Jarvis of Stylus Magazine gave the album a grade A, commenting that "No combination of adjectives could accurately portray what you'll hear and no second-hand gushing will prepare you for the immense pleasure that is sure to wash over you when you put this album on." Mark Pytlik of AllMusic gave the album 4 stars out of 5, saying, "It's menacing, it's enthralling, and it's one of few modern-day records (hip-hop or otherwise) that honestly doesn't sound like anything -- or anyone -- else."

Frank Kogan of The Village Voice wrote: "Even though Clouddead's Odd Nosdam produced the title track on the Sole album, and the sounds on the Clouddead album sometimes fall into rhythm and the talking into meter, the record is probably too empty of rap and too full of static and clouds to meet most people's definition of hip-hop—except for Clouddead's own, of course. Intriguing, but you have to like clouds."

In 2014, it was described by Arron Merat of Fact as "a key touchstone for the North American hip-hop underground."

== Track listing ==
No.	Title	Length
1.	"Apt. A (1)"	6:25
2.	"Apt. A (2)"	5:52
3.	"And All You Can Do Is Laugh. (1)"	5:34
4.	"And All You Can Do Is Laugh. (2)"	5:51
5.	"I Promise Never to Get Paint on My Glasses Again. (1)"	5:45
6.	"I Promise Never to Get Paint on My Glasses Again. (2)"	6:01
7.	"JimmyBreeze (1)"	7:01
8.	"JimmyBreeze (2)"	5:32
9.	"(Cloud Dead Number Five) (1)"	5:24
10.	"(Cloud Dead Number Five) (2)"	6:00
11.	"Bike (1)"	7:12
12.	"Bike (2)"	6:53
Total length:		73:35

== Personnel ==
Credits adapted from liner notes.

- Yoni Wolf (Why?) – vocals
- Adam Drucker (Doseone) – vocals
- David Madson (Odd Nosdam) – production
- Illogic – guest appearance (1)
- DJ Signify – guest appearance (4)
- Sole – guest appearance (5)
- The Wolf Bros. – guest appearance (7)
- Mr. Dibbs – guest appearance (9, 10)
- The Bay Area Animals – guest appearance (11, 12)
