= Kenny Dennis EP =

EP by Serengeti
- Released: April 3, 2012
- Studios: Burnco, Berkeley, California
- Genre: Hip-hop
- Length: 16:58
- Label: Anticon
- Producers: Jel, Odd Nosdam

Kenny Dennis EP is an EP by American rapper Serengeti. It was released on Anticon on April 3, 2012. Entirely produced by Jel and Odd Nosdam, it was recorded in Berkeley, California.

== Critical reception ==
Professional ratings
Review scores
Source	Rating
Christgau's Consumer Guide	A−
Impose	favorable
Pitchfork	7.8/10
Potholes in My Blog	3.5/5 stars
Prefix	8.0/10
San Diego Reader	favorable
Spin	8/10

Matt Sullivan of Impose said: "This is high-caliber parody that avoids cheap laughs by going for deeper, unspoken punchlines." Brett Uddenberg of San Diego Reader called it "well-crafted hilarious escapism."

Spin included it on the "40 Best Hip-Hop Albums of 2012" list.

== Track listing ==
No.	Title	Length
1.	"Rib Tips"	2:44
2.	"Don't Blame Steve"	3:08
3.	"Shazam"	2:25
4.	"Top That"	1:51
5.	"Kenny Dennis"	3:26
6.	"Flat Pop"	3:27
7.	"Perculators" (CD edition bonus track)	3:23
8.	"Dennehy RMX" (CD edition bonus track)	4:06

== Personnel ==
Credits adapted from liner notes.

- Serengeti – vocals
- Jel – production
- Odd Nosdam – production
- Bre'r – bass guitar (5)
- Daddy Kev – mastering
- Frohawk Two-Feathers – artwork
