= Family & Friends =

Studio album by Serengeti
- Released: August 2, 2011
- Genre: Hip-hop
- Length: 31:25
- Label: Anticon
- Producers: Yoni Wolf, Advance Base

Serengeti chronology
Conversations with Kenny / Legacy of Lee (2009)	Family & Friends (2011)	C.A.R. (2012)

Family & Friends is a studio album by American rapper Serengeti. It was released on Anticon in 2011.

== Critical reception ==
Professional ratings
Aggregate scores
Source	Rating
Metacritic	78/100
Review scores
Source	Rating
Christgau's Consumer Guide	A−
Consequence of Sound	C+
Pitchfork	6.8/10
PopMatters	8/10 stars
Rolling Stone	3.5/5 stars
Spin	8/10
URB	5/5 stars

At Metacritic, which assigns a weighted average score out of 100 to reviews from mainstream critics, the album received an average score of 78, based on 14 reviews, indicating "generally favorable reviews".

Brett Uddenberg of URB gave the album 5 out of 5 stars, saying: "Bleak and beautiful, Family & Friends is an absolute beast." Quentin B. Huff of PopMatters gave the album 8 out of 10 stars, calling it "Serengeti's most accessible and straightforward record."

Spin placed it at number 39 on the "40 Best Rap Albums of 2011" list. LA Weekly placed it at number 8 on the "Top 10 Los Angeles Albums of 2011" list.

== Track listing ==
No.	Title	Producer(s)	Length
1.	"Tracks"	Yoni Wolf	2:53
2.	"PMDD"	Advance Base	2:41
3.	"Long Ears"	Yoni Wolf	2:36
4.	"Ha-Ha"	Advance Base	2:35
5.	"A.R.P."	Advance Base	2:13
6.	"Godammit"	Yoni Wolf	2:59
7.	"Flutes"	Advance Base	2:00
8.	"California"	Yoni Wolf	2:54
9.	"The Whip"	Advance Base	5:10
10.	"Family & Friends"	Yoni Wolf	2:30
11.	"Dwight"	Advance Base	2:54

== Personnel ==
Credits adapted from liner notes.

- Serengeti – vocals
- Yoni Wolf – production, backing vocals, mixing
- Advance Base – production, backing vocals, mixing
- Hazel Brown – backing vocals, handclaps
- Martha Brown – backing vocals, handclaps
- Eli Crews – mixing
- Daddy Kev – mastering
- Thomas Brendan – layout, design
