= Beak & Claw =

EP by S / S / S
- Released: March 20, 2012
- Genres: Hip-hop, electronic, indie pop
- Length: 18:00
- Label: Anticon

S / S / S chronology
| Beak & Claw (2012) | Sisyphus (2014) |

Beak & Claw is the debut EP by Sisyphus (released under the name S / S / S), a collaborative project between Serengeti, Sufjan Stevens, and Son Lux. It was released through Anticon on March 20, 2012. If featured guest appearances from Shara Worden and Doseone.

== Critical reception ==
Professional ratings
Aggregate scores
| Source | Rating |
|---|---|
| Metacritic | 64/100 |
Review scores
| Source | Rating |
| Beats Per Minute | 62/100 |
| Christgau's Consumer Guide | A− |
| Consequence of Sound | C+ |
| Paste | 6.7/10 |
| Pitchfork | 4.8/10 |
| Under the Radar | 3/10 stars |

At Metacritic, which assigns a weighted average score out of 100 to reviews from mainstream critics, the EP received an average score of 64, based on 6 reviews, indicating "generally favorable reviews".

Austin Trunick of Under the Radar gave the album 3 out of 10 stars, saying, "Beak & Claw is largely a showcase for Serengeti's ambling, free-association raps, here set to glitchy electro pop, with mostly silly lyrics." He added: "Very little on Beak & Claw seems to fit together, and the artists are a weird match outside the alliteration of their names." Josh Becker of Beats Per Minute gave the EP a 62% rating, saying, "I understand that Beak & Claw is the maiden voyage of an experimental project, but its lack of cohesiveness comes off as a disappointment."

== Track listing ==
| No. | Title | Length |
|---|---|---|
| 1. | "Museum Day" | 6:03 |
| 2. | "Beyond Any Doubt" | 3:26 |
| 3. | "If This Is Real" (featuring Shara Worden) | 3:56 |
| 4. | "Octomom" (featuring Doseone) | 4:35 |

== Personnel ==
Credits adapted from liner notes.

S / S / S

- Serengeti – performance
- Sufjan Stevens – performance
- Son Lux – performance

Additional musicians

- Casey Foubert – bass guitar (1)
- James Mcalister – additional drums (1)
- Shara Worden – vocals (3)
- Doseone – vocals (4), additional programming (4)
- Hal Walker – jaw harp (4), harmonica (4)

Technical personnel

- Ryan Lott – mixing
- John McCaig – mastering
