= Sisyphus (album) =

Studio album by Sisyphus
- Released: March 18, 2014
- Genres: Hip-hop, electronic
- Length: 51:31
- Label: Asthmatic Kitty

Sisyphus chronology
Beak & Claw (2012)	Sisyphus (2014)

Singles from Sisyphus
- 1. "Calm It Down" Released: December 19, 2013

Sisyphus is the debut studio album by Sisyphus, a collaborative project between Serengeti, Son Lux, and Sufjan Stevens. It was released through Asthmatic Kitty on March 18, 2014. The project was commissioned by the Walker Art Center and the Saint Paul Chamber Orchestra's Liquid Music series to accompany an exhibition of the work of visual artist Jim Hodges, scheduled to run from February 14 through May 11, 2014.

Music videos were made for "Calm It Down", "Alcohol", "Booty Call", and "Take Me".

== Critical reception ==
Professional ratings
Aggregate scores
Source	Rating
Metacritic	64/100
Review scores
Source	Rating
AllMusic	3/5 stars
Clash	7/10
Consequence of Sound	C
The Guardian	4/5 stars
MusicOMH	4/5 stars
NME	3.5/5 stars
Pitchfork	6.2/10
PopMatters	5/10 stars
Spectrum Culture	3.5/5 stars

At Metacritic, which assigns a weighted average score out of 100 to reviews from mainstream critics, the album received an average score of 64, based on 17 reviews, indicating "generally favorable reviews".

Jeremy D. Larson of Pitchfork gave the album a 6.2 out of 10, saying: "More often than not, Sisyphus misses its mark, but the album's dense, melancholy back half represents its strongest moments." Meanwhile, Paul MacInnes of The Guardian gave the album 4 stars out of 5, saying: "Even when the fusion doesn't work, you can't help but admire the creativity."

== Track listing ==
No.	Title	Length
1.	"Calm It Down"	6:30
2.	"Take Me"	5:57
3.	"Booty Call"	2:22
4.	"Rhythm of Devotion"	6:02
5.	"Flying Ace"	3:05
6.	"My Oh My"	3:31
7.	"I Won't Be Afraid"	5:15
8.	"Lion's Share"	4:16
9.	"Dishes in the Sink"	3:35
10.	"Hardly Hanging On"	4:18
11.	"Alcohol"	6:40

== Personnel ==
Credits adapted from liner notes.

Sisyphus

- Serengeti – performance
- Son Lux – performance
- Sufjan Stevens – performance

Additional musicians

- Rob Moose – strings (5)
- DM Stith – vocals (8)
- Christopher Wray – guitar (8), bass guitar (8)
- Rafiq Bhatia – guitar (10)

Technical personnel

- Jim Hodges – artwork
- Stephen Halker – Sisyphus logo
- David Regen – back cover photography
- Ronald Amstutz – interior photography

== Charts ==
Chart	Peak position
US Billboard 200	163
US Heatseekers Albums (Billboard)	3
US Independent Albums (Billboard)	32
US Top Rock Albums (Billboard)	47
