= No More Wig for Ohio =

Studio album by Odd Nosdam
- Released: May 19, 2003
- Recorded: Spring 2000 – Spring 2002
- Genre: Instrumental hip-hop
- Length: 55:34
- Label: Anticon
- Producer: Odd Nosdam

Odd Nosdam chronology
Plan 9... Meat Your Hypnotis. (2002)	No More Wig for Ohio (2003)	Burner (2005)

No More Wig for Ohio is a studio album by the American hip-hop producer Odd Nosdam. It was released on Anticon in 2003. It peaked at number 175 on the CMJ Radio 200 chart.

== Critical reception ==
Professional ratings
Aggregate scores
Source	Rating
Metacritic	62/100
Review scores
Source	Rating
AllMusic	2.5/5 stars
Dusted Magazine	mixed
Pitchfork	6.7/10
XLR8R	favorable

At Metacritic, which assigns a weighted average score out of 100 to reviews from mainstream critics, the album received an average score of 62, based on 6 reviews, indicating "generally favorable reviews".

Stanton Swihart of AllMusic gave the album 2.5 stars out of 5, saying: "The album is potentially valuable as a source for samples, but it fails as a listening experience." Chris Dahlen of Pitchfork gave the album a 6.7 out of 10, saying, "all this disc really tells us is that Odd Nosdam's a solid DJ who likes doofy vinyl." Dave Segal of XLR8R described the album as "hip-hop's answer to The Faust Tapes".

== Track listing ==
No.	Title	Length
1.	Untitled	2:05
2.	Untitled	2:51
3.	Untitled	1:56
4.	Untitled	1:26
5.	Untitled	2:56
6.	Untitled	3:23
7.	Untitled	2:26
8.	Untitled	0:45
9.	Untitled	1:53
10.	Untitled	1:10
11.	Untitled	0:51
12.	Untitled	2:06
13.	Untitled	2:52
14.	Untitled	1:34
15.	Untitled	1:26
16.	Untitled	2:10
17.	Untitled	1:13
18.	Untitled	2:15
19.	Untitled	2:19
20.	Untitled	2:09
21.	Untitled	3:33
22.	Untitled	3:10
23.	Untitled	4:00
24.	Untitled	5:10
Total length:		55:34

== Personnel ==
Credits adapted from liner notes.

- Odd Nosdam – production
- Dax Pierson – keyboards (2)
