= Burner (Odd Nosdam album) =

Studio album by Odd Nosdam
- Released: June 6, 2005
- Recorded: May 1998 – February 2005
- Genre: Hip-hop
- Length: 50:49
- Label: Anticon
- Producer: Odd Nosdam

Odd Nosdam chronology
No More Wig for Ohio (2003)	Burner (2005)	Level Live Wires (2007)

Singles from Burner
- 1. "Untitled Three" Released: April 25, 2005

Burner is a studio album by American hip-hop producer Odd Nosdam. It was released on Anticon in 2005. "Untitled Three" was released as a single from the album. The album peaked at number 7 on the Dusted Top 40 Radio Chart.

== Critical reception ==
Professional ratings
Aggregate scores
Source	Rating
Metacritic	81/100
Review scores
Source	Rating
CMJ New Music Monthly	favorable
Cokemachineglow	70/100
Dusted Magazine	favorable
Filer Mini	88/100
The Milk Factory	4.3/5
Pitchfork	7.0/10
Playlouder	4/5 stars
Prefix	7.0/10

At Metacritic, which assigns a weighted average score out of 100 to reviews from mainstream critics, the album received an average score of 81, based on 9 reviews, indicating "universal acclaim".

Brian Howe of Pitchfork gave the album a 7.0 out of 10, describing it as "a digest of field recordings, Moog synths, staticky samples, and scattershot drums, all waxing and waning around immovable slabs of buzzing bass." He added: "It splits the difference between the eschatological IDM of Boards of Canada's Geogaddi and Keith Fullerton Whitman's coruscating dronescapes."

Jordan Harper of Riverfront Times listed it as the most overlooked album of 2005.

== Track listing ==
No.	Title	Length
1.	"Untitled One"	3:17
2.	"Refreshing Beverage"	4:21
3.	"Choke"	0:30
4.	"Small Mr. Man Pants"	6:01
5.	"Untitled Two"	8:28
6.	"11th Ave Freakout Pt. 1"	2:30
7.	"11th Ave Freakout Pt. 2"	4:06
8.	"Clouded"	2:26
9.	"Untitled Three"	6:00
10.	"Gun"	0:44
11.	"Upsetter"	3:41
12.	"Flying Saucer Attack"	8:45
Total length:		50:49

== Personnel ==
Credits adapted from liner notes.

- Odd Nosdam – production, recording, mixing, photography, artwork
- Liz Hodson – vocals (1, 8), front cover collage
- Bomarr – sampler (1)
- Martin Dosh – Rhodes piano (2), drums (2), percussion (2), noise (2)
- Andrew Broder – guitar (4), keyboards (4), loop (4)
- Örvar Þóreyjarson Smárason – melodica (4)
- Dax Pierson – keyboards (5)
- Mike Patton – vocals (6, 7), keyboards (6, 7), noise (6, 7)
- Dee Kesler – violin (6, 7), noise (6, 7)
- Jessica Bailiff – guitar (6, 7, 12), vocals (9), percussion (9)
- Doug McDiarmid – guitar (6, 7), keyboards (6, 7)
- Josiah Wolf – bass guitar (6, 7), drums (6, 7)
- Jel – drum programming (6, 7)
- Jesse Edwards – guitar (9, 12), recorder (9)
- George Horn – mastering
