= The 30th Song =

Studio album by Mr. Dibbs
- Released: February 28, 2003
- Genre: Hip hop
- Length: 73:56
- Label: Rhymesayers Entertainment
- Producers: Mr. Dibbs; Fat Jon; Jel; DJ T-Rock

Singles from The 30th Song
- 1. "Outreach 5" Released: November 19, 2002

The 30th Song is the debut studio album by American hip hop DJ and record producer Mr. Dibbs. It was released on Rhymesayers Entertainment on February 28, 2003. "Outreach 5" was released as a single from the album on November 19, 2002. The album was ranked at number 27 on CMJ's Hip-Hop 2003 chart.

== Critical reception ==
Professional ratings
Review scores
Source	Rating
AllMusic	4/5 stars
CMJ New Music Report	favorable
Exclaim!	mixed
XLR8R	favorable

John Bush of AllMusic gave the album 4 stars out of 5, describing it as "a mostly instrumental journey through moods and grooves with (slightly) less emphasis on the sprawling grandeur of one of the Midwest's best turntablists." He added: "Poised halfway between the grandiose sonic austerity of DJ Shadow and the turntable madness of most turntablists, Mr. Dibbs shows how it's able to age gracefully in hip-hop." Michaelangelo Matos of Chicago Reader wrote: "As a piece, The 30th Song makes a case for Dibbs as the most interesting turntablist currently working." Meanwhile, Thomas Quinlan of Exclaim! stated: "Like most Dibbs releases, The 30th Song is heavy on drums, with plenty of psychedelic layers and cuts added, but sadly it still doesn't live up to his best effort, resting somewhere between the skate soundtrack Primitive Tracks and his Turntable Scientifics masterpiece."

In his review for The Village Voice, Chuck Eddy wrote: "A Cincinnati vinyl virtuoso who knows sixteenth notes and slide-guitared blues licks like Department of Eagles know mellow bits, Mr. Dibbs settles for being Yngwie Malmsteen on the wheels of steel way too often. But in the track beginning with Grace Slick at Woodstock, the guy at least demonstrates self-knowledge about his onanism addiction".

== Track listing ==
No.	Title	Length
1.	"Outreach 5"	3:00
2.	"1000 Drumps"	2:18
3.	"I Hate Greg"	3:01
4.	"Captain Splatter Patty"	3:30
5.	"Machine"	2:12
6.	"Rhythmic Soaring"	2:43
7.	"Redout Brick Hemmorage 3.5 / Mental Herpes"	5:06
8.	"Omega Prophecy"	8:59
9.	"Delta Bound"	6:20
10.	"Judeas Transmission"	3:51
11.	"Thrice" (featuring Slug)	1:42
12.	"Skin Therapy"	2:36
13.	"231 Ways to Fry an Egg"	9:47
14.	"Porntablist" (featuring DJ T-Rock)	18:51
Total length:		73:56

== Personnel ==
Credits adapted from liner notes.

- Mr. Dibbs – turntables, production (2–14), executive production
- Fat Jon – production (1)
- Jel – co-production (6)
- Boo Boo McAfee – live performance (8)
- Tommy Davison – live performance (8)
- Slug – vocals (11), executive production
- DJ T-Rock – turntables (14), co-production (14)
- Brent Sayers – executive production
- Jason Cook – project coordination
- Devious – artwork
- Fat Nick – photography
