= Terradactyl =

Studio album by Serengeti & Polyphonic
- Released: June 23, 2009
- Genre: Hip-hop
- Length: 42:45
- Label: Anticon
- Producer: Polyphonic

Serengeti & Polyphonic chronology
Don't Give Up (2007)	Terradactyl (2009)

Terradactyl is the second collaborative studio album by American musicians Serengeti and Polyphonic. It was released on Anticon in 2009.

== Critical reception ==
Professional ratings
Review scores
Source	Rating
AllMusic	4.5/5 stars
Drowned in Sound	6/10
PopMatters	9/10
RapReviews	7/10
Spectrum Culture	3.5/5
XLR8R	5.5/10

Marisa Brown of AllMusic gave the album 4.5 out of 5 stars, calling it "an impressive, difficult, intelligent record that manages to be accessible, compelling, and nearly indecipherable all at once." She added: "Much, if not most, of this is thanks to Polyphonic, a talented producer who writes arrangements whose air of simplicity belies their complexity." Eddie Fleischer of Cleveland Scene said: "For those who complain that rap has gone stale, Terradactyl proves otherwise."

== Track listing ==
No.	Title	Length
1.	"Bon Voyage"	2:57
2.	"Playing in Subway Stations"	3:19
3.	"Move!"	4:01
4.	"My Negativity"	3:11
5.	"Cleveland"	3:17
6.	"Steroids" (featuring Doseone)	4:03
7.	"Patiently"	4:29
8.	"Call the Law"	3:27
9.	"La La Lala" (featuring Buck 65)	3:06
10.	"My Patriotism"	2:58
11.	"Dawn Under the Bridge"	3:50
12.	"Calliope"	4:12

== Personnel ==
Credits adapted from liner notes.

- Serengeti – vocals
- Polyphonic – music
- Renee-Louise Carafice – additional vocals (2, 11), guitar (2), harp (11)
- John Pheiffer – cello (4)
- Doseone – additional vocals (6)
- Buck 65 – additional vocals (9)
- Jeremy Horwitz – mandolin (10)
- William Waheed Freyman – recording
- Mike Wells – mastering
- Mike Davis – artwork
