= Polyphonic (producer) =

Polyphonic Will Freyman
- Born: Champaign, Illinois
- Origin: Chicago, Illinois
- Genres: Electronic, underground hip-hop
- Occupation: Record producer
- Labels: Anticon, Audio 8 Recordings

Will Freyman, better known by the stage name Polyphonic the Verbose, is an American musician and record producer. Growing up he played classical piano and jazz trombone, and went on to play synths, percussion, and various instruments in noise music bands, Afro-Cuban percussion ensembles, and other groups. While moving between Chicago and San Francisco, he recorded multiple hip-hop and electronic albums with a string of different collaborators, including Don't Give Up and Terradactyl with Serengeti, and worked with Ben LaMar Gay on their collaboration Juba Dance.

Polyphonic's first solo album Abstract Data Ark was released in 2006. This was followed by the EP Easy Listening for Empire Building in 2009. His second solo album Post Species Speaker was released in 2012.

== Personal life ==
Polyphonic lives in Oakland, California. He holds a PhD from the University of California, Berkeley in computational evolutionary biology and has coauthored over twenty scientific articles.

== Discography ==
=== Solo ===
- Abstract Data Ark (Audio 8 Recordings, 2006)
- Easy Listening for Empire Building EP (Audio 8 Recordings, 2009)
- Post Species Speaker (Audio 8 Recordings, 2012)

=== With Juba Dance ===
- Orange (Audio 8, 2007)
- Orange Juiced (Audio 8, 2008)

=== With Serengeti ===
- Don't Give Up (Audio 8 Recordings, 2007)
- I Got This Melody B-Sides and Remixes (Audio 8 Recordings, 2008)
- Terradactyl (Anticon, 2009)
- Bells and a Floating World (Anticon, 2010)
- Select Choices EP (Audio Recon, 2017)

=== As producer ===
- Infrastructure by Dolce Stil Nuovo (Audio 8 Recordings, 2001)
- Certain Sound by Nico B., Flesh O.N.E. & Polyphonic the Verbose (Audio 8 Recordings, 2003)
- Vandal Squad by Pugs Atomz (Audio 8 Recordings, 2004)
- Playing with Matches by Pugs Atomz (Audio 8 Recordings, 2004)
- Prostitute Karaoke by Sunn Tha Sarkastik, Polyphonic, Flesh O.N.E., A.M. Overtone (Audio 8 Recordings, 2004)
- Locket in a Well by Wick (Audio 8, 2006)
- Race Trading by Serengeti (Audio 8, 2006)
