= There's a Situation on the Homefront =

Studio album by Tha Grimm Teachaz
- Released: June 15, 2010
- Genre: Hip-hop
- Length: 40:13
- Labels: Anticon, Breakfast Records, Chopped Herring Records, Legendary Entertainment
- Producer: DJ Koufie

There's a Situation on the Homefront is a studio album by American hip-hop group Tha Grimm Teachaz. It was originally released in 2010.

== Critical reception ==
Professional ratings
Review scores
Source	Rating
Christgau's Consumer Guide	A−

In 2011, Pitchfork included it on the "Overlooked Mixtapes" list. Writing for Pitchfork, Jeff Weiss described it as "a high-concept parody/love letter to the Golden Age, with a guest spot from Son Doobie and beats ostensibly raided from one of Buckwild's dusty crates." Ben Westhoff of The Guardian said: "It's both a parody of, and a homage to, early 90s hip-hop, in which Serengeti raps from the perspective of a middle-aged white man named Kenny Dennis, an overweight telephone-booth repairman and family man who was formerly signed to Jive and beefed with Shaq."

== Track listing ==
No.	Title	Length
1.	"Got R Own Thing"	3:03
2.	"Whatchyougonnado?"	3:34
3.	"I Getz" (featuring Son Doobie)	3:46
4.	"Melissa"	3:43
5.	"Ay Muthafucka!"	2:26
6.	"Frontin'" (featuring MC17)	3:22
7.	"Double M"	3:14
8.	"Poobutts" (featuring MC17)	3:20
9.	"Snap Ya Neck!"	2:22
10.	"Grimm Savyas" (featuring MC17)	3:48
11.	"Grimm Teachin'"	3:22
12.	"There's a Situation on the Homefront"	2:56

Expanded reissue edition
No.	Title	Length
1.	"Got R Own Thing"	3:03
2.	"Whatchyougonnado?"	3:34
3.	"I Getz" (featuring Son Doobie)	3:46
4.	"Melissa"	3:43
5.	"Ay Muthafucka!"	2:26
6.	"Frontin'" (featuring MC17)	3:22
7.	"Fresh Greg Interlude A"	1:04
8.	"Double M"	3:14
9.	"Poobutts" (featuring MC17)	3:20
10.	"Snap Ya Neck!"	2:22
11.	"Fresh Greg Interlude B"	1:16
12.	"Grimm Savyas" (featuring MC17)	3:48
13.	"Grimm Teachin'"	3:22
14.	"Fresh Greg Interlude C"	1:23
15.	"There's a Situation on the Homefront"	2:56
