= Eliquate =

American hip hop group

- Origin: Santa Cruz, California, United States
- Genres: Indie, alternative hip hop, rock
- Years active: 2009–present
- Label: Eliquate Entertainment
- Members: Elliot Wright; Jamie Schnetzler; Cosmo Stevens; Dan Wells; Tanner Christiansen
- Website: eliquate.com

Eliquate is an alternative hip hop band formed in 2009 in Santa Cruz, California.

== History ==
Eliquate was formed in 2019 by frontman Elliot Wright when a friend introduced him to guitarist Jamie Schnetzler. Over the next year, bass guitarist Cosmo Stevens, drummer Dan Wells and keyboard player Tanner Christiansen were added to the group. In 2010, Eliquate released their first album, Arch Rhythm. This was followed by an EP, Who the F*#K is Eliquate?, in 2011. They then released a second album, The Chalkboard's War Against Erasers in 2014.

Eliquate has performed with Murs, Del the Funky Homosapien, Zion-I, RJD2 and Sage Francis.

== Personnel ==
- Elliot Wright - lead vocals
- Jamie Schnetzler - lead guitar, backing vocals
- Daniel Wells - drums, backing vocals
- Cosmo Stevens - bass guitar, backing vocals
- Tanner Christansen - keyboard, samples, monome

== Reactions ==
Mat Weir, writing on SanatCruz.com, said of A Chalkboard’s War Against Erasers, "One wouldn’t expect a hip-hop/funk/rock album by a bunch of post-college 20-somethings from the Digital Generation to be a mind-teaser about the philosophy of syntax, literature, perseverance and the moments of self-deprecation before the inner Phoenix rises again."

== Discography ==
- Arch Rhythm (2010)
- Who the F*#K is Eliquate? EP (2011)
- "A Chalkboard's War Against Erasers" album (2013)
