= Tha Grimm Teachaz =

American hip-hop group

- Origin: Chicago, Illinois
- Genre: Underground hip-hop
- Years active: 1991–1993
- Labels: Anticon, Chopped Herring Records, Legendary Entertainment, Breakfast Records
- Members: KDz; PMDF; DJ Koufi
- Website: www.anticon.com

Tha Grimm Teachaz was a fictional American underground hip-hop group. It consisted of Serengeti's alter ego KDz (Kenny Dennis a.k.a. Killa Deacon), Hi-Fidel's alter ego PMDF (Prince Midnight Dark Force), and DJ Koufi.

== History ==
According to the band's lore, Tha Grimm Teachaz was signed to Jive Records in the early 1990s. However, the trio got shelved shortly after an encounter with Shaq Fu at the Jive showcase in 1993, leaving Da End Iz Near unreleased.

In 2010, Kenny Dennis' little brother Tanya rediscovered two albums, There's a Situation on the Homefront and Da End Iz Near, while cleaning out his garage.

There's a Situation on the Homefront, an album recorded in 1993, was released on Breakfast Records in 2010. It features guest appearances from Son Doobie of Funkdoobiest, among others.

== Discography ==
- There's a Situation on the Homefront (2010)
