= Tosh Townend =

American skateboarder (born 1985)

Tosh Townend (born March 12, 1985) is a professional skateboarder from Huntington Beach, California. He is married to entrepreneur and Shark Tank alumna Nicole Townend, (formerly DeJesus— born November 13, 1985).

Together, they have a daughter named Jemmaly (born March 10, 2010). He turned pro at the age of 16. Tosh Townend got sponsored by Element when he was 11, and was on the team until 2008.

Tosh Townend's father is Australian Peter Townend, the 1976 surfing world champion. His father would have boards around the house and would let Tosh ride them.

Tosh first followed his father's footsteps and surfed. He started surfing in the National Scholastic Surfing Association when he was seven years old and became the NSSA Junior Middle School California Champion in 1996. However, when Peter was working at Rusty, Tosh started skateboarding more and at 11, he won the California Amateur Skateboard League in the 11 and under division, and at 12, the 14 and under division. These wins, and the sponsorships that followed, propelled him into his professional skateboarding career.

He is now co-owner of a grass roots company called Good Skateboards based out of his hometown of Huntington Beach.
