= Scribble Jam =

Hip-Hop music festival

- Genre: Hip hop
- Dates: August
- Location: Cincinnati, Ohio
- Years active: 1996-2009
- Founders: Scribble Magazine and DJ Mr. Dibbs
- Website: scribblemagazine.com

Scribble Jam was an annual hip hop music festival hosted in Cincinnati, Ohio. Dubbed "America's largest hip hop festival", sort of like Woodstock. It was co-founded in 1996 by "Fat" Nick Accurso, and Jason Brunson, founders of graffiti magazine Scribble, and DJ Mr Dibbs, in the parking lot of a local nightclub. The following year's event benefitted from better publicity, and included MC, DJ and breakdance battles for the first time.

In 2000, with the addition of new partners Tony Heitz and Pase Rock, the festival grew in popularity, as tens of thousands of hip hop fans flocked to its grounds in early August. It has been known to attract up to 20,000 fans. In early April 2010, Scribble Jam organizer Kevin Beacham confirmed the persistent rumors that the event would no longer continue, citing the struggling economy and difficulty in securing funding as reasons.

For most of its existence, Scribble Jam refused corporate sponsorship, which Accurso explained as an attempt to keep the festival from being run by "those who don't understand [hip hop] culture", adding that outside marketing or promotion would "defeat the purpose" of the festival. By 2003, however, the festival had started accepting some corporate sponsors; that year's event was backed by Toyota/Scion.

== Competition ==
The centerpieces of the Scribble Jam festival are the five competitions, four of which are designed to highlight the main aspects of hip hop culture. They include the emcee competition or freestyle battle, the DJ battle or scratching competition, the B-boy battle or breakdancing competition, the graff-writer or graffiti competition, and the beatbox competition. Historically, the most popular of the competitions has been the freestyle battle, although all aspects of hip hop culture are well represented. The festival expanded its initial 1996 emcee and b-boy competitions to include the DJ competition in 1998. In 2003 the beatbox competition was added to the line-up. In the last five years of the festival a Production competition was added to the festival line-up, and there were performances by guests including KRS-One, Eminem, Sage Francis, Atmosphere, Blueprint, Eyedea, Mr Dibbs, Little Brother and Living Legends which greatly increased the festival's popularity.

== Past winners ==
As of Scribble Jam's conclusion in 2008 there have been thirteen emcee champions, eleven DJ champions, thirteen B-Boy champions, and six beatbox champions.

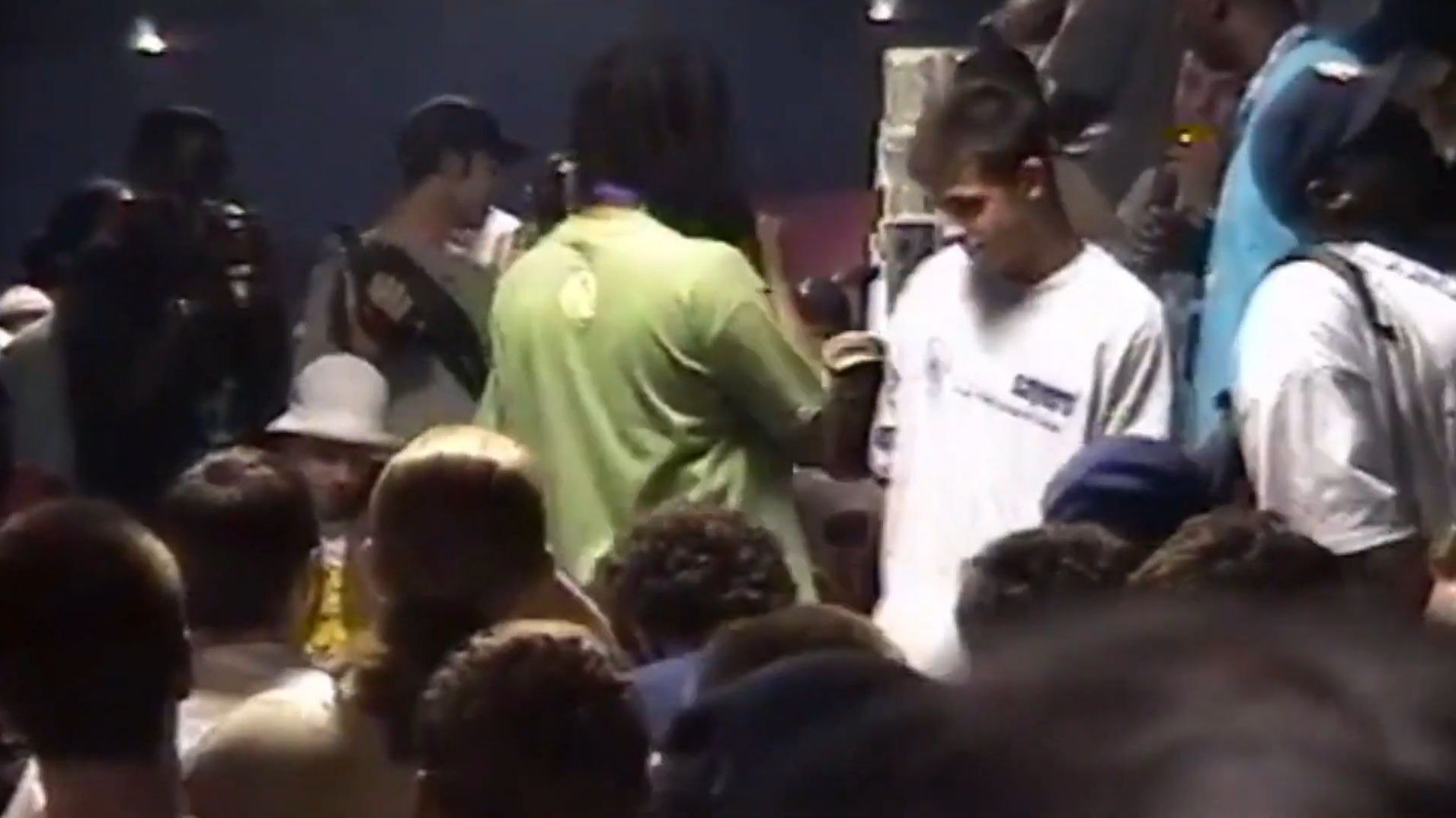
Eyedea at Scribble Jam 1999.

=== Emcee battle ===
- 1996 - Vendetta
- 1997 - Juice
- 1998 - Adeem
- 1999 - Eyedea
- 2000 - Sage Francis (as Xaul Zan)
- 2001 - Adeem
- 2002 - Mac Lethal
- 2003 - Rhymefest
- 2004 - illmaculate
- 2005 - Justice
- 2006 - The Saurus
- 2007 - Nocando
- 2008 - The Saurus

=== DJ competition ===
- 1998 - DJ Precyse
- 1999 - DJ Abilities
- 2000 - DJ Precyse
- 2001 - DJ Sprite
- 2002 - DJ Skwint
- 2003 - Skratch Bastid
- 2004 - Skratch Bastid
- 2005 - Spare Change
- 2006 - I-Dee
- 2007 - Skratch Bastid
- 2008 - DJ T-Lo

=== B-boy competition ===
- 1996 - Forrest Getemgump (individual)
- 1997 - Self-Explanatory
- 1998 - Phase II
- 1999 - Midwest Junkie Cats (group with members of the Junkwartz and the Battlecats)
- 2000 - Junkwartz
- 2001 - Motion Disorderz
- 2002 - Motion Disorderz
- 2003 - Motion Disorderz
- 2004 - Motion Disorderz
- 2005 - Brickheadz
- 2006 - Brickheadz
- 2007 - Motion Disorderz
- 2008 - Brickheadz

=== Beatbox battle ===
- 2003 - A Train
- 2004 - A Train
- 2005 - J.Beetz (from SICK.SOUND.SYNDROME)
- 2006 - DJ Snuggles
- 2007 - Poizunus
- 2008 - Scott Jackson

There are only two production champions listed on the official Scribble Jam website:

- 2008 - Optiks
- 2007 - X:144

== See also ==
- List of hip hop music festivals
- Hip hop culture
- Underground hip hop
