= ZayALLCAPS =

zayALLCAPS
- Born: March 1999 (age 27)
- Origin: Sacramento, California
- Genres: Alternative R&B; indie rap; pop rap
- Occupations: Rapper; singer; producer
- Years active: 2021–present
- Label: autotuneKaraoke

zayALLCAPS (born March 1999) is an American rapper, singer, and producer. A Sacramento, California native and based in Los Angeles, he has released music since 2021, with his works labeled as pop rap, indie rap and alternative R&B. His first and second albums, Balling Out of Spite and iMessage Platinum: Hosted by autotuneKaraoke, were released in 2023 and 2024, respectively. His 2025 song "MTV's Pimp My Ride" was ranked by several music publications as one of the best songs of the year, and appeared on his third album, art Pop * pop art (2025). He released his latest album, My Uncle Told Me Some Real Ass Shit on the Phone Yesterday, in 2026.

== Life and career ==
zayALLCAPS was born in March 1999, (Note: In an interview, he claimed that his 25th birthday occurred in March of 2024.) and is a native of Sacramento, California. He is also based in Los Angeles; outlets described him as from "LA-via-Sacramento" and "L.A.-by-way-of-Sacramento". He is half-Filipino, and his parents were music fans that listened to gospel alongside artists such as Tupac, Notorious B.I.G., and Mac Dre. He cited T-Pain as a formative influence from his childhood, and discovered SoundCloud artists in his adolescence such as Soulelection, Odd Future, The Internet, Jet Age of Tomorrow, Matt Martians, and Pyramid Vitra, along with plugg music. He also took inspiration from MIKE and 454 in his early work. zayALLCAPS plays the piano and keyboard, incorporating them into his production; in a 2025 Flood interview, he stated that learning music theory aided in his production style and creation process. He began releasing music in 2021 with his first releases primarily comprising EPs, such as I'm Slowly Getting Better. In 2023, he released his debut album Balling Out of Spite, which was labeled as pop-rap. His second album, iMessage Platinum: Hosted by autotuneKaraoke, was released in 2024. The album included the song "Pickelz3", which Samuel Hyland of Pitchfork regarded as a standout track.

In 2025, zayALLCAPS released the track "MTV's Pimp My Ride", inspired by and referencing the titular TV show. Andre Gee in Rolling Stone's No Filler column described it as "the kind of love song that doesn't insist upon soul-bearing yearning or reeling a girl in with gifts, just the cheeky request to 'pimp my ride.'" Pitchfork gave the song a "Best New Track" rating, with Mano Sundaresan declaring it a "certified anthem." The Fader listed the track as a contender for Song of the Summer in 2025, and the song appeared in Fader and Consequence's lists of the best songs of 2025. Stereogum also ranked "Work It Out", featuring Disco Sam and inspired by DāM FunK, as among the best songs of 2025. Both songs appeared on his third album, art Pop * pop art, which was released on July 25, 2025. The album is labeled under indie rap, and zayALLCAPS cited artists such as Static Major, Omarion, Lloyd and Jodeci as the album's influences. He released the album under his own label, autotuneKaraoke, named as a juxtaposition between the robotic nature of auto-tune and karaoke's human-based singing. Pitchfork rated the album a 7.8/10, and Vice ranked the album as one of the ten best Hip-Hop and R&B albums of 2025.

zayALLCAPS released the music video for "SATURN", a track from art Pop * pop art, in January 2026. The same year, he announced his latest album, My Uncle Told Me Some Real Ass Shit on the Phone Yesterday, which was released on July 24, 2026. Consequence labeled the album as alternative R&B, and Pitchfork reviewer Hattie Lindert described its sound as a "blend of pluggnB and West Coast rap experimentalism". In a Consequence article, zayALLCAPS revealed he worked on the album over several years. He produced most of the album's tracks, and the album guest features co-producer Conworld, Anto the Wayward, Silas Short and Jaiyn among others. Pitchfork rated the album an 8.1/10; Lindert asserted that it "charts both the layers of Zay's eclectic taste profile… and the process of manifesting his bespoke style."

== Discography ==
=== Studio albums ===
- Balling Out of Spite (2023)
- iMessage Platinum: Hosted by autotuneKaraoke (2024)
- art Pop * pop art (2025)
- My Uncle Told Me Some Real Ass Shit on the Phone Yesterday (2026)

=== Extended plays ===
- I'm Slowly Getting Better
