= Odd Nosdam =

American hip-hop producer, DJ and visual artist

- Born: David P. Madson; 1976 (age 49–50)
- Origin: Cincinnati, Ohio
- Genres: Alternative hip-hop, ambient, dub
- Occupations: Producer, DJ
- Instrument: Sampler
- Years active: 1998–present
- Labels: Anticon, Leaving Records, Burnco Recs, Baro, Joyful Noise Recordings
- Website: nosdam.bandcamp.com

David P. Madson (born 1976), better known by his stage name Odd Nosdam, is an American underground hip-hop producer, DJ and visual artist. He is co-founder of the record label Anticon. He has remixed tracks by a variety of bands and artists including Boards of Canada, The Notwist, and Sole.

== History ==
Odd Nosdam was first noticed for his production on cLOUDDEAD, the debut album released in 2001 by cLOUDDEAD, his former group with Yoni Wolf of Why? and Doseone. In 2002, under the name Reaching Quiet, Yoni Wolf and Nosdam released their collaborative effort, In the Shadow of the Living Room. Nosdam's third beat tape, No More Wig for Ohio, self-released in 2002, was rereleased by Anticon in 2003.

In 2005, Odd Nosdam released his first proper solo album, Burner, which features Örvar Þóreyjarson Smárason of múm, Jessica Bailiff, Andrew Broder of Fog, Dosh, and Dax Pierson, among others. Level Live Wires, Nosdam's second solo album, was released in 2007 and features Tunde Adebimpe of TV on the Radio, Dee Kesler of Thee More Shallows, Chris Adams of Hood, Jel, and Jessica Bailiff. Also in 2007, Nosdam created the soundtrack for Element Skateboards video This Is My Element and in 2009, released the music as the T.I.M.E. Soundtrack.

Serengeti, Jel, and Odd Nosdam's first collaborative effort, Kenny Dennis EP, was released in 2012. It was followed by C.A.R., Kenny Dennis LP, C.A.B., and Kenny Dennis III.

== Discography ==
=== Solo ===
- Anecdoticselfportrait (1998) cassette
- Plan 9... Meat Your Hypnotis. (1999) cassette
- Nonametape (1999) cassette
- Reject (2001) CD
- Plan 9... Meat Your Hypnotis. (2002) 2LP/CD
- No More Wig for Ohio (2002) CD
- No More Wig for Ohio (2003, reissue) 2LP/CD
- Your American Bonus (2004) 7"
- Untitled Three (2005) 12"
- Burner (2005) 2LP/CD
- Vol. 8 (2006) CD
- cLOUDDEAD instrumentals (2007) CD
- Level Live Wires (2007) LP/CD
- The Exciting Sounds of Level Live Wires (2007) bonus CD
- This Is My Element Soundtrack (2007) CD
- Pretty Swell Explode (2008) 2LP/2CD
- 15 Minutes of Funk (2008) CD
- Circus Faux Prez Beats! (2008) download
- T.I.M.E. Soundtrack (2009) LP/CD
- Vol. 9 (2004-2007) (2010) CD/download
- If Grill du Rot (1999-2001) (2012) download
- Vol. 7.1 (2000-2003) (2013) download
- Kenny Dennis LP Instrumentals (2013) download
- T r i s h (2013) cassette/download
- Vol. 17 (2005-2009) (2014) download
- Music to Psychic Drive By (2014) cassette/download
- Sisters (2016) LP/VHS/download
- Music For Raising (2016) cassette/download
- LIF (2017) CD/download
- Off Tapes Outtakes (2017) download
- Mirrors (2019) LP/download

=== Mixtapes ===
- Le Mixtape (2001)
- Le Mixtape Delux (2002)
- "Le Mix Live" (2004)
- Rap Tapes Mixtape (2005)
- Le Mix Ambient (2006)
- Thrift Store Mixtape (2006)
- Dies of Happiness, of Sorrow, Dreams (2008)
- Mixtape Super Delux (2008)
- Nofoolisnotaintready (2009)
- Albatross Pub Dub (2009)
- Le Mix Ambient (2013) cassette version

=== Collaborations ===
- Madtoons Beat Orchestra - "So Long, Mike Part 1" b/w "Black Light District" (2000)
- Reaching Quiet - "113th Clean" on Ropeladder 12 (2000)
- Why? / Odd Nosdam - Split EP! (2001)
- Anticon - We Ain't Fessin' (Double Quotes) (2002)
- Reaching Quiet - In the Shadow of the Living Room (2002)
- Odd Nosdam / Drape - Flower Snow Falls (2009)
- Jel & Odd Nosdam - "Tune in an Afternoon" (2009)
- Bre'r with Odd Nosdam - Woulds Gallery Show (2009)
- Odd Nosdam / Matthewdavid - Swedish Fish (2011)
- Jel & Odd Nosdam - Pot Holes Beat Tape (2012)
- Jel & Odd Nosdam - Geti Beats Vol. 1 (2012)
- Bre'r & Odd Nosdam - "0911" (2012)

=== Productions ===
- Sole - "Man and Woman" & "Bottle of Leftovers" from Bottle of Humans (2000)
- Sage Francis - "Eviction Notice" from Personal Journals (2002)
- Sole - "Salt on Everything" & "Selling Live Water" from Selling Live Water (2003)
- Dosh - "Naoise" from Pure Trash (2004)
- Sole - "Cheap Entertainment", "Sin Carne", "Manifesto 232", "Banks of Marble", "Atheist Jihad" & "Dumb This Down" from Live from Rome (2005)
- Peeping Tom - "Five Seconds" & "Your Neighborhood Spaceman" from Peeping Tom (2006)
- Sage Francis - "Underground for Dummies" from Human the Death Dance (2007)
- Themselves - "Rapping 4 Money" from The Free Houdini (2009)
- Serengeti - Kenny Dennis EP (2012)
- Serengeti - C.A.R. (2012)
- Serengeti - Kenny Dennis LP (2013)
- Serengeti - C.A.B. (2013)
- Serengeti - Kenny Dennis III (2014)

=== Remixes ===
- Sole - "Selling Live Water (Dead Food Remix w/Jel)" from "Plutonium" (2003)
- Themselves - "You Devil You (Remix)" from The No Music of AIFFs (2004)
- Pedestrian - "The Toss & Turn (Quick Dub)" (2004)
- Skyrider - "No Good (Nosdam's Dub)" (2006)
- Windsor for the Derby - "Empathy For People Unknown (Odd Nosdam Remix)" (2006)
- Serena-Maneesh - "Don't Come Down Here (Blasted Remix)" (2006)
- Boards of Canada - "Dayvan Cowboy (Odd Nosdam Remix)" from Trans Canada Highway (2006)
- Thee More Shallows - "Freshman (Remix)" from Monkey vs. Shark (2006)
- Alias & Tarsier - "Ligaya (Odd Nosdam Remix)" (2006)
- The Klez-X - "Yom Pom Nosdam (Remix)" (2007)
- Bracken - "(Growin' Up in the Hood) Four Thousand Style" (2007)
- Black Moth Super Rainbow - "Forever Heavy (Shoegangster/JB Remix)" (2008)
- The Notwist - "Sleep (Odd Nosdam Remix)" (2008)
- Danielson - "Our Givest (Odd Nosdam Remix)" (2008)
- Genghis Tron - "Colony Collapse (Odd Nosdam Remix)" from Board Up the House Remixes Volume 4 (2008)
- Sole and the Skyrider Band - "One Egg Short of an Omelette (Odd Nosdam Remix)" from Sole and the Skyrider Band Remix LP (2008)
- Restiform Bodies - "Consumer Culture Wave (Odd Nosdam Remix)" (2008)
- Dark Dark Dark - "Junk Bones (Odd Nosdam Remix)" (2009)
- Themselves - "Skinning the Drum (Odd Nosdam Remix)" from Crowns Down & Company (2010)
- Lali Puna - "Safe Tomorrow (Odd Nosdam Remix)" (2011)
- Saroos - "Outrigger (Jel & Odd Nosdam Remix)" (2011)
- Mwahaha - "Sleep Deep (Jel & Odd Nosdam Remix)" (2011)
- Main Attrakionz - "J Bar (Odd Nosdam Remix)" (2011)
- Serengeti - "Dennehy (Jel & Odd Nosdam Remix)" (2012)
- Black Moth Super Rainbow - "Windshield Smasher (Odd Nosdam Remix)" (2012)
- Sole - "Young Sole (Odd Nosdam Remix)" (2012)
- Kaigen x Shing02 - "Jikaku (Odd Nosdam Remix)" (2012)
- Blade Runner - "Cities and the Sky (Odd Nosdam Remix)" (2013)
- Blade Runner - "Waiting... (Odd Nosdam Remix)" (2013)
- El Ten Eleven - "Thanks Bill (Odd Nosdam Remix)" (2013)
- MJC - "Archetype One (Odd Nosdam Remix)" (2013)
- MJC - "Archetype One Reprise (Odd Nosdam Remix)" (2013)
- Teebs - "Outside Chimes (B-Day Bonus Beat)" (2013)
- Saroos - "Sequoia (Odd Nosdam remix / feat. Drape & Bre'r)" (2014)
- Harold Budd - "Feral (Odd Nosdam Remix)" (2014)
- WC Tank - "Reconsidering (Odd Nosdam Remix)" (2014)
- Teebs - "The Endless (Odd Nosdam Remix)" (2015)
- Nmesh - "White Lodge Simulation (Odd Nosdam Remix)" (2017)
- Badlands - "Doubts (Odd Nosdam Remix)" (2023)
