= Sisyphus (hip-hop group) =

American musical project

- Also known as: S / S / S
- Genres: Alternative hip-hop, trip hop, indie pop, electronic
- Years active: 2012–present
- Labels: Anticon, Asthmatic Kitty, Joyful Noise
- Members: Serengeti; Son Lux; Sufjan Stevens
- Website: asthmatickitty.com/artists/sisyphus/

Sisyphus (formerly S / S / S) is a collaborative project between Serengeti, Ryan Lott (under the moniker Son Lux) and Sufjan Stevens.

== History ==
The trio released their debut EP, Beak & Claw, on Anticon in 2012. It features vocal contributions from Shara Worden and Doseone. In 2013 the trio changed their name to Sisyphus. In an interview, Stevens said, "S/S/S started to sound like the Nazi Schutzstaffel with a lisp, so we had to change it." The name is inspired in part by the art of Jim Hodges, whose work is featured on the cover of their self-titled debut full-length album, which was released on March 18, 2014. Stevens says the "gold and metallic boulders Jim made were an obvious influence on our name change"—a reference to four steel-clad boulders installed at the Walker Art Center in Minneapolis. Sisyphus performed at opening of Hodges' retrospective at the Walker on February 14, 2014.

== Discography ==
- Beak & Claw EP (Anticon, 2012)
- Sisyphus (Asthmatic Kitty/Joyful Noise, 2014)
