= Don't Give It Up =

Don't Give It Up may refer to:

- "Don't Give It Up" (Siobhán Donaghy song)
- "Don't Give It Up" (Lemar song)
- "Don't Give It Up" (Robbie Patton song)
- "Don't Give It Up" (Six60 song)
- "Don't Give It Up", a song by Emma Paki from Oxygen of Love
