= Don't Give Up (album) =

Studio album by Serengeti & Polyphonic
- Released: April 17, 2007
- Genre: Hip-hop
- Length: 38:08
- Label: Audio 8 Recordings
- Producer: Polyphonic

Serengeti & Polyphonic chronology
| Don't Give Up (2007) | Terradactyl (2009) |

Don't Give Up is the first collaborative studio album by Serengeti & Polyphonic. It was released on Audio 8 Recordings in 2007.

== Critical reception ==
Professional ratings
Review scores
| Source | Rating |
|---|---|
| Impose | favorable |
| PopMatters | 7/10 stars |
| Washington City Paper | favorable |
| XLR8R | mixed |

Jason Randall Smith of Impose said: "Musically ahead of its time while lyrically speaking in real time, Serengeti & Polyphonic have created an album that will likely get better with age." Jesse Serwer of XLR8R praised Polyphonic's production, saying: "With nods to microhouse, drum & bass, dub, and ambient sounds, Polyphonic's beats have an entirely unique, otherworldly feel to them."

Ben Westhoff of Washington City Paper placed it at number 6 on the "Top Ten Albums of 2007" list. Quentin B. Huff of PopMatters placed it at number 20 on the "101 Hip-Hop Albums of 2007" list.

== Track listing ==
| No. | Title | Length |
|---|---|---|
| 1. | "Eleven" | 3:34 |
| 2. | "Puppydog Love" | 3:02 |
| 3. | "Lately I Haven't Been Feeling That Well" | 3:03 |
| 4. | "Slew of Things Differently" | 3:46 |
| 5. | "Praha" | 2:46 |
| 6. | "2 Times 2" | 2:24 |
| 7. | "Waste of Time" | 3:13 |
| 8. | "Don't Fear the Mimes" | 3:06 |
| 9. | "Rambo" | 3:51 |
| 10. | "Mom's a Commie" | 3:37 |
| 11. | "Don't Give Up" | 3:01 |
| 12. | "Sunrise" | 2:45 |
