= Serengeti (rapper) =

American rapper

- Born: David Cohn
- Origin: Chicago, Illinois, U.S.
- Genre: Hip-hop
- Occupation: Rapper
- Years active: 2003–present

David Cohn, better known by his stage name Serengeti, is an American rapper from Chicago, Illinois.

== Early life ==
Serengeti is the great-nephew of jazz trumpeter Sonny Cohn. He grew up in various places in Chicago, Illinois, as his parents divorced when he was 5 years old. At the age of 12, he got into hip-hop. He started writing verses while attending Morgan Park High School. He attended Southern Illinois University Carbondale, where he became friends with Open Mike Eagle. He graduated from the university in 2001 with a degree in history.

== Career ==
In 2007, Serengeti released his first collaborative album with producer Polyphonic, titled Don't Give Up. The duo released their second collaborative album, Terradactyl, in 2009.

In 2011, Serengeti released his solo album, Family & Friends, which was produced by Yoni Wolf and Owen Ashworth.

Serengeti is a member of Sisyphus along with Son Lux and Sufjan Stevens. The trio released Beak & Claw in 2012 and a self-titled album in 2014.

In 2012, Serengeti released C.A.R., as well as Kenny Dennis EP. Kenny Dennis EP was Serengeti's first release chronicling the biography of his meta character "Kenny Dennis", a once-famous gangsta rap artist navigating life after the peak of stardom. The EP was later ranked among the top 40 hip-hop releases of 2012 by SPIN magazine. He followed this up with Kenny Dennis LP in 2013 and Kenny Dennis III in 2014.

2020 saw the well-received release of Ajai with collaborator Kenny Segal, a continuation of the Kenny Dennis canon. Cohn raps about the life of Ajai, a new character obsessed with designer clothing and sneaker drops, who interacts with Dennis within the drop-collecting community.

== Style ==
Serengeti's music is a sharp departure from most mainstream hip-hop, which he considers "depressing" and always consists of "the same redundant ideas."

In an interview, Serengeti said he created Dennehy as an "answer to common complaints about hip-hop" and "to put the fun back in hip-hop."

== Discography ==
=== Studio albums ===
- Dirty Flamingo (F5 Records, 2003)
- Gasoline Rainbows (Day by Day Entertainment, 2006)
- Thunder Valley (Audio 8 Recordings, 2006)
- Race Trading (Audio 8 Recordings, 2006)
- Noticeably Negro (Audio 8 Recordings, 2006)
- Dennehy (Bonafyde Recordings, 2006; Fake Four Inc., 2017 - reissue with bonus tracks)
- Conversations with Kenny / Legacy of Lee (Golden Floyd Records, 2009)
- Family & Friends (Anticon, 2011)
- C.A.R. (Anticon, 2012)
- Saal (Graveface Records, 2013)
- Kenny Dennis LP (Anticon, 2013)
- Kenny Dennis III (Joyful Noise, 2014)
- Kaleidoscope (Audio Recon, 2017)
- Jueles - Butterflies (self-released, 2017)
- To the Max (self-released, 2018)
- Dennis 6e (self-released, 2018)
- Music from the Graphic Novel: Kenny vs the Dark Web (Burnco Recs, 2019)
- EUD (Geti Enterprises, 2019)
- The Gentle Fall (Cohn Corporation, 2020)
- Kdxmpc (Cohn Corporation, 2020)
- have a summer (Cohn Corporation, 2021)
- KDIV (2024)
- Palookaville (2024)
- symphony of psalms (2026)
- Kenny V (2026)
- Shark Attack (2026)

=== Collaborations ===
- Noodle-Arm Whimsy (The Frozen Food Section, 2005) (with Dirty Heat)
- Don't Give Up (Audio 8 Recordings, 2007) (with Polyphonic)
- The Boredom of Me (Audio 8 Recordings, 2008) (with Renee-Louise Carafice and Tony Trimm, as Yoome)
- Friday Night (Breakfast Records, 2008) (with Hi-Fidel, as Friday Night)
- Terradactyl (Anticon, 2009) (with Polyphonic)
- There's a Situation on the Homefront (Breakfast Records, 2010) (with Hi-Fidel and DJ Koufie, as Tha Grimm Teachaz)
- Saturday Night (Breakfast Records, 2010) (with Hi-Fidel, as Friday Night)
- Shtaad (Blank Records, 2011) (with Sicker Man, as Shtaad)
- Sisyphus (Asthmatic Kitty/Joyful Noise, 2014) (with Son Lux and Sufjan Stevens, as Sisyphus)
- Time and Materials (Mello Music Group, 2015) (with Open Mike Eagle, as Cavanaugh)
- Testarossa (Joyful Noise, 2016) (with Yoni Wolf, as Yoni & Geti)
- Doctor My Own Patience (Graveface Records, 2016) (with Sicker Man)
- Ajai (Cohn Corporation/Fake Four Inc., 2020) (with Kenny Segal)
- With Greg From Deerhoof (Joyful Noise Recordings, 2020) (with Greg Saunier)
- Ajai II (self-released, 2022) (with Child Actor)
- Open I Remixes Vol 1 (CC King, 2024) (with Open I)

=== Remix albums ===
- Friday Night Remixed (Breakfast Records, 2010) (with Hi-Fidel, as Friday Night)
- The Remixes by Open I, Vol. 1 (OTHAR, 2024)

=== EPs ===
- Bells and a Floating World (Anticon, 2010) (with Polyphonic)
- There's a Situation on the Homefront EP (Chopped Herring Records, 2011) (with Hi-Fidel and DJ Koufie, as Tha Grimm Teachaz)
- Davis (Leaving Records, 2011) (with Matthewdavid, as Davis)
- Beak & Claw (Anticon, 2012) (with Son Lux and Sufjan Stevens, as S / S / S)
- Kenny Dennis EP (Anticon, 2012)
- C.A.B. (Anticon, 2013)
- You Can't Run from the Rhythm (Joyful Noise, 2015) (with Anders Holm, as Perfecto)
- Dust (F5 Records, 2016)
- Kaleidoscope EP (Joyful Noise, 2017)
- Derek (Fake Four Inc./Audio Recon, 2017)
- Kaleidoscope 2 (self-released, 2018)
- The Moon (self-released, 2018)
- 6e Features from Berlin (self-released, 2019)
- Quail (Audio Recon, 2019)
- Energy (Geti Enterprises, 2019)
- Quarantine Recordings (Auto Reverse Records, 2020) (with Open Mike Eagle, as Cavanaugh)

=== Singles ===
- "Black Giraffes / Busty Women" (F5 Records, 2003)
- "Fast Living / Breakfast of Champions" (The Frozen Food Section, 2005)
- "Be a Man" (Graveface Records, 2012) (with Advance Base and Tobacco)
- "Firebird Logo" (Burnco Recs, 2013)
- "Havin' a Time" (Geti Enterprises, 2019)
- "Ajai Epilogue" (Cohn Corporation/Fake Four Inc., 2020) (with Kenny Segal)
- "Première" (Joyful Noise Recordings, 2020)
- "Unblu" (Loves Way, 2020) (with Jenny Lewis)
- "hacksaws" (CC KING, 2023) (with Marcus Drake)
- "gianfranco" (CC King, 2023) (with Owen Cubitt)
- "Owen arm n" (CC King, 2024) (with Owen Cubitt)
- "shark attack" (CC King, 2024) (with Owen Cubitt)
- "story try" (CC King, 2025)
- "two tunes with owen Cubitt" (CC King, 2025) (with Owen Cubitt)
- "The Great Western Race" (CC King, 2025) (with Greg Saunier)

=== Guest appearances ===
- Themselves - "Keys to Ignition" from The Free Houdini (2009)
- Tobacco - "2 Thick Scoops" from LA UTI (2010)
- Open Mike Eagle - "Easter Surgery" from Unapologetic Art Rap (2010)
- Open Mike Eagle - "Four Days" from Extended Nightmares Getdown: The Dark Blue Door (2011)
- Open Mike Eagle - "Universe Man" from 4nml Hsptl (2012)
- Open Mike Eagle - "Credits Interlude" from Component System with the Auto Reverse (2022)

=== Compilation appearances ===
- "Blood Pt. 2" on Dark Was the Night (2009)
