= Jim Hodges (artist) =

American artist

- Born: October 16, 1957 (age 68); Spokane, Washington
- Alma mater: Pratt Institute
- Known for: Sculpture
- Notable work: Don't Be Afraid; Look and See

Jim Hodges (born October 16, 1957) is a New York-based installation artist. He is known for his mixed-media sculptures and collages that involve delicate artificial flowers, mirrors, chains as spiderwebs, and cut-up jeans.

== Early life and education ==
Jim Hodges was born in Spokane, Washington and received his Bachelor of Fine Arts degree from Fort Wright College in 1980. He received his Master of Fine Arts degree from Pratt Institute in Brooklyn, New York, in 1986. That year he met art collector Elaine Dannheisser who let him use a studio in the basement of her foundation on Duane Street in exchange for working as a part-time art handler. During this time he abandoned his original medium of painting and started exploring materiality; this became his first major artistic crisis because he had realized that his concepts weren't connecting with his paintings.

After living in Dannheisser's basement for approximately four years, his creativity suffered. Only dedicating three days a week to making art, he eventually became poor, unstable, and lived in his studio illegally until Dannheisser kicked him out. However, after he became sober, his career picked up with a piece called Flesh Suspense (1989–1990).

== Style and works ==
Since the late 1980s, Hodges created a broad range of work exploring themes of fragility, temporality, love, and death. His works frequently employed different materials and techniques, from ready-made objects to more traditional media, such as metal chains, artificial flowers, gold leaf, and mirrored elements. Hodges' conceptual practice, which addressed overlooked and obvious touchstones of life, reflected human experience and mortality.

Hodges challenged the acceptance of traditionally feminine materials and craft by expanding the possibilities of these materials in his own works. As seen in "With the Wind" (1997) and "You" (1997), he consistently incorporated embroidery to magnify notions of domesticity, a mother's presence, and early notions of femininity.

Originally influenced by the woods of his hometown of Spokane, nature plays a reoccurring role throughout his works. In the years following his graduation from Pratt Institute, Hodges struggled to develop a theme within his works that would express his role as an artist. His use of color disappeared during this period, when he abandoned painting and gradually developed a process of creation through destruction. Color was reincorporated when he began using fabric flowers. Hodges did not intend this as an appropriation of nature but its antithesis: fake flowers. Abstractions of nature permeate Hodges' oeuvre and are further demonstrated through his interest in camouflage as a way to represent the landscape through an abstract medium. This is evident in his 2016 mirror-and-glass work I dreamed a world and called it love, an immersive installation at Gladstone Gallery which was meant to call to mind an abstraction of Claude Monet's room-encompassing paintings at the Musée de l'Orangerie, Paris.

During the late 1990s, artists responded to the AIDS epidemic with forms of expression ranging from the written word to abstract artistic statements reflected in anger or elegy. This movement led to iconic artwork influenced by advocacy group AIDS Coalition to Unleash Power (ACT UP). Hodges' work emerged through the direct influence of his personal experience, and through his notions of love and acceptance towards the self and those in other circumstances.

=== A Little Extra Something ===
In A Little Extra Something (1990–1991) Hodges covered the surface of a sheet of paper with theatrical make-up, where the paper resembled skin and the makeup showed delight in its application. This piece, according to Hodges, alluded to his own homosexuality.

=== Saliva-transfer drawings ===
In 1992 Hodges incorporated himself into the material of his pieces through the use of his saliva. He drew ink doodles of spider webs, clovers, chains, lines, spirals, and a matrix of dots, then blurred them with his saliva by pressing the wet images against another paper and created different printed impressions. Hodges said that by using his saliva with his materials, it revealed a "sensuous act", where his hand would draw the images and his mouth would transmit it. This expressed Hodges' empowerment, and was intended to disrupt the preconception of bodily fluids as something horrifying.

=== Don't Be Afraid ===
In 2004 Hodges was invited by Susan Stoops, a curator at the Worcester Art Museum, to create a mural on the museum rotunda. During this time, the U.S. government was raising concerns of public safety with a series of alerts. Responding to this and the destruction of the World Trade Center, Hodges offered the message "don't be afraid" for comfort and support to the citizens of America. He wrote a letter of invitation to all the UN delegates, incorporating their handwritten versions of this phrase to create a global chorus that conveyed a message of inclusion, strength, and optimism. Hodges had received more than one hundred translations in over seventy languages; the only country which refused to participate was the United States.

=== Untitled (2010) ===
In 2010, Hodges was invited to speak about his friend and colleague Felix Gonzalez-Torres at Artpace in San Antonio, Texas. Instead of a lecture, Hodges collaborated with Carlos Marques da Cruz and Encke King in a 60-minute film called Untitled (2010). The film quilted fragments from various social media outlets such as the 1980s AIDS/HIV activism of ACT UP, TV shows such as The Golden Girls, Dynasty, and The Wizard of Oz, and images of the burning oil fields of Iraq and the death camps of World War II. Hodges described this work as a fragment of a continuum which could be added or reworked endlessly. Hodges attempted to mirror the content that shaped the life of Gonzalez-Torres before he lost his battle with AIDS in 1996.

== Exhibitions and permanent installations ==
Hodges had been the subject of numerous solo exhibitions in the United States and Europe and his work had been included in various group exhibitions, including the 2004 Whitney Biennial. Hodges is currently a senior critic in the Sculpture Department at the Yale University School of Art.

Jim Hodges: Give More Than You Take was a mid-career retrospective of Hodges' work organized by the Walker Art Center and the Dallas Museum of Art. This exhibition opened at the Dallas Museum on October 6, 2013, and visited the Walker in Minneapolis, the Institute of Contemporary Art in Boston, and the Hammer Museum in Los Angeles, closing on January 17, 2015. The retrospective was accompanied by a large-format appraisal of Hodges' work, edited by Jeffrey Grove and Olga Viso.

Hodges' piece Don't Be Afraid was installed at the Hirshhorn Museum and Sculpture Garden in Washington, D.C. in 2005. A recent large-scale sculpture, look and see (a nine-ton stainless steel abstraction of camouflage) was purchased by the Albright-Knox Art Gallery, Buffalo, New York on October 30, 2006.

=== Solo exhibitions ===
- 2022: "Impossible Flower," Baldwin Gallery, Aspen, Colorado
- 2022: "Location Proximity," Gladstone Gallery, New York
- 2020: "LOVE POWER," Massimo De Carlo, Hong Kong, PRC
- 2019: "Unearthed," Grace Cathedral, San Francisco, California
- 2019: "Jim Hodges," Pizzuti Collection of CMA, Columbus Museum of Art, Columbus, Ohio
- 2018: "Jim Hodges: silence stillness," Anthony Meier Fine Arts, San Francisco, California
- 2017: "turning pages in the book of love / voltando pagine nel libro dell’amore", Massimo de Carlo Gallery, Milan, Italy
- 2017: "Tracing the contour of our days," Baldwin Gallery, Aspen, Colorado
- 2016: "With Liberty and Justice for All," rooftop installation, The Contemporary Austin, Texas
- 2016: "I dreamed a world and called it Love.," Gladstone Gallery, New York
- 2016: "Jim Hodges," Stephen Friedman Gallery, London, United Kingdom
- 2015: "Jim Hodges," Gladstone Gallery, Brussels
- 2014: "Jim Hodges: Give More Than You Take," Hammer Museum, Los Angeles, California [traveled from: Dallas Museum of Art, Dallas, Texas (2013); Walker Art Center, Minneapolis (2014); Institute of Contemporary Art, Boston (2014)]
- 2014: "Jim Hodges," Anthony Meier Fine Arts, San Francisco, California
- 2014: "With Liberty and Justice For All (A Work in Progress)," Aspen Art Museum, Colorado
- 2012: "Jim Hodges: Drawings," Baldwin Gallery, Aspen, Colorado
- 2011: "Jim Hodges," Gladstone Gallery, New York
- 2010: "Jim Hodges: New Work," Dieu Donné, New York
- 2010: "Jim Hodges," Gladstone Gallery, Brussels
- 2009: "Jim Hodges: you will see these things," Aspen Art Museum, Aspen, Colorado
- 2009: "Jim Hodges: Love Etc.," Centre Georges Pompidou, Paris [traveled to: Fondazione Bevilacqua La Masa, Venice (2010); Camden Arts Centre, London (2010)]
- 2008: "Jim Hodges," CRG Gallery, New York
- 2008: "Jim Hodges," Stephen Friedman Gallery, London, United Kingdom
- 2008: "Jim Hodges," Anthony Meier Fine Art, San Francisco, California
- 2005: "Jim Hodges: this line to you," Centro Galego de Arte Contemporanea, Santiago de Compostela, Spain
- 2005: "Look and See," Creative Time Commission at the Ritz Carlton Plaza Battery Park, New York
- 2005: "Directions - Jim Hodges," Hirshhorn Museum and Sculpture Garden, Washington D.C.
- 2005: "Jim Hodges," Museum of Contemporary Art, Cleveland, Ohio
- 2004: Jim Hodges: "Don’t be Afraid," Worcester Art Museum, Worcester, Massachusetts
- 2003: "Jim Hodges," Tang Teaching Museum and Art Gallery at Skidmore College, Saratoga Springs, New York [traveled to: Weatherspoon Art Museum, Greensboro, North Carolina; Museum of Contemporary Art, Cleveland, Ohio; Austin Museum of Art, Austin, Texas (2004)]
- 2003: "Jim Hodges," Stephen Friedman Gallery, London, United Kingdom
- 2003: "Returning," Art Pace, San Antonio, Texas
- 2003: "colorsound," Addison Gallery of American Art, Phillips Academy, Andover, Massachusetts
- 2002: "Jim Hodges: Constellation of an Ordinary Day," Jundt Art Museum, Gonzaga University, Spokane, Washington
- 2002: "Jim Hodges: Subway Music Box," Day-Ellis Gallery, Northwest Museum of Arts & Culture, Spokane, Washington
- 2002: "this and this," CRG Gallery, New York
- 2002: "like this," Dieu Donné Papermill, New York
- 2001: "Jim Hodges," Camargo Vilaça, São Paulo, Brazil
- 2001: "Jim Hodges: 3 Drawings," CRG Gallery, New York
- 2000: "Capp Street Project: Subway Music Box," Tecoah Bruce Gallery of the Oliver Art Center, California College of Arts and Crafts, Oakland, California
- 2000: "Jim Hodges," Anthony Meier Fine Arts, San Francisco, California
- 1999: "Jim Hodges," Miami Art Museum, Miami, Florida
- 1999: "Jim Hodges: Cool Blue," Marc Foxx Gallery, Los Angeles, California
- 1999: "every way," Museum of Contemporary Art, Chicago, Illinois [traveled to: Institute of Contemporary Art, Boston, Massachusetts]
- 1998: "Jim Hodges: Recent Work," CRG Gallery, New York
- 1998: "Jim Hodges: Welcome," Kemper Museum of Contemporary Art, Kansas City, Missouri
- 1997: "Jim Hodges," Galerie Ghislaine Hussenot, Paris, France
- 1997: "Jim Hodges: no betweens and more" SITE Santa Fe, Santa Fe, New Mexico
- 1996: "yes," Marc Foxx, Santa Monica, California
- 1996: "States," Fabric Workshop & Museum, Philadelphia
- 1995: "Jim Hodges," CRG Art, Inc., New York
- 1995: "Jim Hodges," Bard Center for Curatorial Studies and Hessel Museum of Art, Annandale-on-Hudson, New York
- 1994: "Everything For You," Interim Art, London
- 1994: "A Diary Of Flowers," CRG Art, Inc., New York
- 1994: "New AIDS Drug," Het Apollohuis, Eindhoven, The Netherlands
- 1993: "Our Perfect World," Grey Art Gallery, New York
- 1991: "White Room," White Columns, New York
- 1989: "Historia Abscondita," Gonzaga University Gallery, Spokane, Washington
- 1986: "Master of Fine Arts Thesis Exhibition," Pratt Institute, New York

== Gallery ==
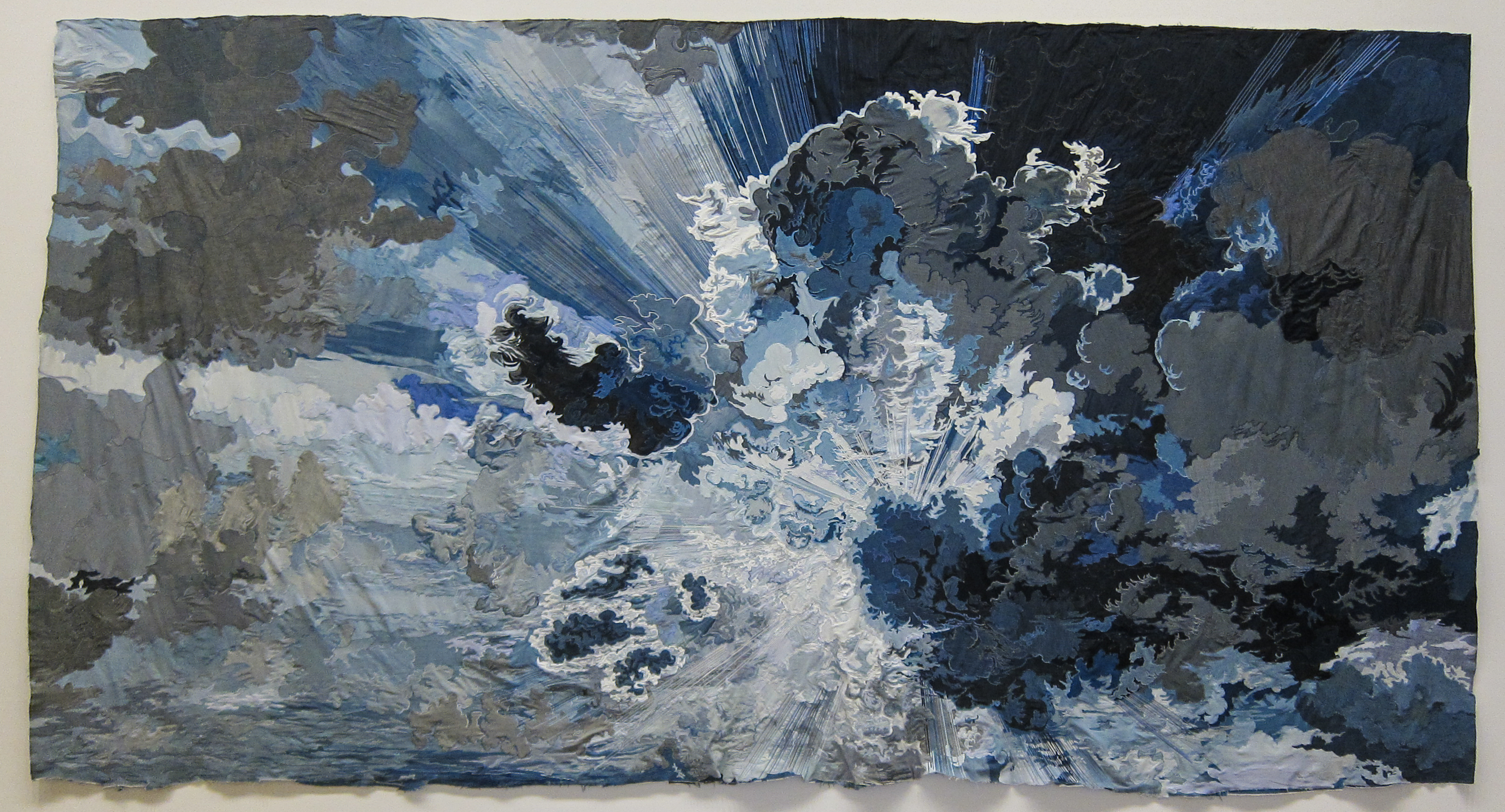
Untitled (one day it all comes true), 2013. Inspired by the sunsets during his time in upstate New York, Jim Hodges embroidered this textile work out of denim.
