= Clouddead =

American hip hop group

- Origin: Cincinnati, Ohio, U.S.
- Genres: Experimental hip hop; lo-fi; ambient; psychedelia
- Years active: 1998–2004
- Labels: Mush Records; Big Dada
- Past members: Doseone; Why? Odd Nosdam

Clouddead (styled as cLOUDDEAD) was an American experimental hip hop group, consisting of Doseone (Adam Drucker), Why? (Yoni Wolf) and Odd Nosdam (David Madson).

The group's name came from a nonsensical knock-knock joke Drucker's sister told him when she was five years old.

== History ==
Clouddead's first six 10-inch singles were compiled as a self-titled album, Clouddead, in 2001.

Printed on the sleeve of the single "Dead Dogs Two" is "this is cLOUDDEAD number 9 of ten," indicating that Ten (2004) was Clouddead's final record. All three of its members have continued to perform and release music since the group's dissolution, including on Anticon during its span as a collective and a label.

== Discography ==
Albums

- cLOUDDEAD (2001)
- Ten (2004)

EPs

- The Peel Session (2001)

Singles

- "apt. A" (2000)
- "and all you can do is laugh" (2000)
- "I promise never to get paint on my glasses again" (2001)
- "JimmyBreeze" (2001)
- "(cloud dead number five") (2001)
- "Bike" (2001)
- "The Sound of a Handshake / This About the City" (2002)
- "Dead Dogs Two" (2004)

== See also ==
- List of ambient music artists
