= Damsel (2018 soundtrack) =

Damsel (Original Motion Picture Soundtrack)

Soundtrack album by the Octopus Project
- Released: June 22, 2018
- Recorded: 2018
- Genre: Film soundtrack; experimental; acoustic
- Length: 39:30
- Label: Milan Records

The Octopus Project chronology
| Memory Mirror (2017) | Damsel (2018) | The Disappearance of Toby Blackwood (2022) |

Damsel (Original Motion Picture Soundtrack) is the soundtrack to the 2018 film Damsel directed by David Zellner and Nathan Zellner, starring Robert Pattinson and Mia Wasikowska. The film score is composed by The Octopus Project and featured two songs performed by Pattinson and Russell Mael. It was released under the Milan Records label on June 22, 2018, the same day as the film's release.

== Background ==
The Octopus Project which collaborated with David on Kid-Thing (2012) and Kumiko, the Treasure Hunter (2014) composed the score for Damsel. David confirmed the band's involvement in his Instagram account in February 2017, but the band was involved early on the project, reading the script and coming up with musical ideas while filming. Nathan considered the band's involvement being similar to having an assistant editor who provides temp tracks while editing and change their themes. However, added that they take some of the tools and techniques which they use in the normal music, with lot of acoustic instruments. The band also used musical saw over a theremin, thereby adapting and looping them. They use numerous traditional instruments applying a modernistic electronical stuff, though Nathan added "they understood the tone early on and it was fun working to craft the film and the edit as they were doing the score at the same time" creating a cohesive film.

In March 2017, Pattinson confirmed that he would record vocals for one of the songs in the film, after his previous singing stints in Twilight (2008) and How to Be (2009). The brothers jointly wrote the song "Honeybun", recorded by Pattinson; David liked the idea of having musical performances in the film, and when he knew about Pattinson's ability as a musician, he was appealed by it. He likened it to the cowboy songs in Western films, similar to Ricky Nelson's singing style in Rio Bravo (1959). David recorded a demo of Pattinson's vocals in his phone and sent to the band to come up with a melody, which he sent it back again to Pattinson, who played the guitar. Russell Mael of Sparks had also recorded one song in the film.

== Track listing ==
| No. | Title | Length |
|---|---|---|
| 1. | "Samuel & Penelope" | 2:23 |
| 2. | "Town" | 1:15 |
| 3. | "All Fixed Up" | 1:46 |
| 4. | "Yodel For A Hanging" (Russell Mael) | 1:06 |
| 5. | "Outhouse Lullaby" | 0:53 |
| 6. | "Will We Meet Again?" | 1:16 |
| 7. | "Baltimore" | 3:41 |
| 8. | "Zachariah Running Bear" | 1:11 |
| 9. | "Regular Horses" | 1:04 |
| 10. | "Rufus" | 1:35 |
| 11. | "Cakewalk" | 2:40 |
| 12. | "Funeral" | 0:36 |
| 13. | "The Wake" | 2:16 |
| 14. | "Winchester" | 1:23 |
| 15. | "Homestead" | 1:02 |
| 16. | "Tree Carving" | 0:58 |
| 17. | "Butterscotch" | 2:15 |
| 18. | "Spaces" | 1:20 |
| 19. | "Clean State" | 1:28 |
| 20. | "Back to Town" | 1:42 |
| 21. | "Parting Ways" | 3:07 |
| 22. | "The End" | 2:13 |
| 23. | "Honeybun" (Robert Pattinson) | 2:11 |
| Total length: | | 39:30 |

== Reception ==
Christy Lemire of RogerEbert.com "the string-heavy score from The Octopus Project heightens the feeling of melancholy." Todd McCarthy of The Hollywood Reporter wrote "Especially good, too, is the score by The Octopus Project, an electrified combination of banjo, musical saw, fiddle, guitar and flute." Jeannette Catsoulis of The New York Times wrote "A marvelously weird score by the Octopus Project greases the more leisurely moments as predatory wildlife". Justin Chang of Los Angeles Times described it "a rich, synth-heavy score by the Octopus Project". Hannah Strong of Little White Lies called it "a brilliant score which will bear repeat listening". Dana Schwartz of Entertainment Weekly wrote "The real heart of the movie is the unearthly score from electronica band The Octopus Project."

David Edelstein of Vulture wrote "The music is the other terrific thing. It's by the Octopus Project [...] and features spooky guitar twangs and the occasional synthesized otherworldly wind. Its expressiveness helps the Zellner brothers steer clear of outright tomfoolery and find a mood all their own, in which comic ineptitude is born of loneliness and desperation." Peter Travers of Rolling Stone called it an "ethereal, electronic score". Daniel Hensel of The Michigan Daily called it "a hazy and psychedelic but stubbornly western score by The Octopus Project". Rob Hunter of Film School Rejects wrote "the score by The Octopus Project layers in music that moves between the serene and foreboding."
