= Dandelion Gum =

Studio album by Black Moth Super Rainbow
- Released: May 22, 2007
- Recorded: 2004–2006
- Genres: Indietronica, synth-pop, psychedelic pop, experimental, lo-fi
- Length: 46:42
- Label: Graveface

Black Moth Super Rainbow chronology
The House of Apples and Eyeballs (2006)	Dandelion Gum (2007)	Eating Us (2009)

Professional ratings
Review scores
Source	Rating
AllMusic	4/5 stars
Okayplayer	(95/100)
Pitchfork	(7.8/10)

Dandelion Gum is the third studio album by Pennsylvania based experimental band Black Moth Super Rainbow, released on CD on May 22, 2007. A 2xLP edition was released on March 15, 2008; the first 1000 copies sold included double gatefold packaging, pink vinyl with gold splashes, and a bubblegum scratch-and-sniff cover, the first 500 of which were hand-numbered. In March, 2011 a deluxe re-issue with 14 "extra flavor" tracks was announced.

== Background ==
In 2006, an EP called Lost, Picking Flowers in the Woods was released containing the song of the same name, as well as other songs that later appeared on Dandelion Gum. "Sun Lips" is the first track by Black Moth Super Rainbow to be accompanied by an official music video. In mid-2008, it was announced (via an update to the band's official website) that Tobacco would be releasing an album called Super Gum (Destroying Dandelion Gum), rumored to be a remix album. The cover for this album is a crop from a Garbage Pail Kids trading card, Stinker Belle, as found by Tom (aka Rokto) via tumblr.

== Track listing ==
1. "Forever Heavy" – 4:16
2. "Jump into My Mouth and Breathe the Stardust" – 2:33
3. "Melt Me" – 2:22
4. "Lollipopsichord" – 1:32
5. "They Live in the Meadow" – 2:33
6. "Sun Lips" – 3:16
7. "Rollerdisco" – 2:34
8. "Neon Syrup for the Cemetery Sisters" – 2:52
9. "The Afternoon Turns Pink" – 2:37
10. "When the Sun Grows on Your Tongue" – 2:40
11. "Spinning Cotton Candy in a Shack Made of Shingles" – 3:11
12. "Drippy Eye" – 3:13
13. "Lost, Picking Flowers in the Woods" – 3:22
14. "Caterpillar House" – 1:58
15. "Wall of Gum" – 0:59
16. "Untitled Roadside Demo" – 3:34
17. "(Untitled Hidden Track)" – 3:10

=== Deluxe edition (2011) ===
No.	Title	Length
1.	"The Dark Forest Joggers"	1:33
2.	"Royal Firecracker Teeth"	1:38
3.	"We Are the Pagans"	2:12
4.	"All the Friends You Can Eat (original)"	1:30
5.	"Happy Melted City"	2:53
6.	"Another Place"	2:24
7.	"Helium Tea"	0:49
8.	"Lemon Lime Face"	0:40
9.	"Twin of Myself (original)"	3:21
10.	"Moody Day"	2:49
11.	"Changing You All"	2:14
12.	"Marshmallow Window"	1:54
13.	"Untitled Roadside Demo (original)"	1:48
14.	"Old Yes"	1:39

"Sun Lips" (2007)

Notes

- "Caterpillar House", "They Live in the Meadow", "Drippy Eye", and "Lost, Picking Flowers In the Woods" appeared on the Lost, Picking Flowers in the Woods EP.
- On the vinyl LP, Side A has a bonus track, "The Dark Forest Joggers" - 1:32; This track later reappeared on an MP3 download on BMSR's Myspace called Bonus Drippers (The Older Unreleased & Hard-To-Find Songs).
- "Forever Heavy" was later remixed by Odd Nosdam, the first BMSR track to be remixed and released officially.
- "We Are the Pagans" was originally going to be on Dandelion Gum, but later featured on the Drippers - EP.
- Track 16 ends at 2:45, followed by silence until Track 17 begins (Hidden Track, titled "Dudes, Don't Stop Singing" on Extra Flavor (Dandelion Gum-Era Sessions)).
- The order of the tracks on the vinyl release is different from the CD.
