= Malibu Ken =

American hip-hop duo

- Genres: Hip-hop
- Years active: 2018–present
- Label: Rhymesayers
- Members: Aesop Rock; TOBACCO

Malibu Ken (also known as Aesop Rock & TOBACCO are Malibu Ken) is an American hip-hop duo composed of rapper Aesop Rock and multi-instrumentalist Tobacco. The duo released their eponymous debut album on January 18, 2019, through Rhymesayers Entertainment.

== History ==
In 2007, Tobacco's band Black Moth Super Rainbow opened for part of a North American tour headlined by Aesop Rock. According to Aesop, he and Tobacco had wanted to work together on a project since their meeting during this tour, with Aesop calling Tobacco's production "something special". The following year, Aesop featured on the track "Dirt" from Tobacco's debut album Fucked Up Friends. In November 2018, the pair announced that they were releasing their debut album under the moniker Malibu Ken in January 2019, and released the album's first single "Acid King" and its accompanying music video at the same time. The second single, "Corn Maze", released the following month, also with a music video. On January 18, 2019, Malibu Ken was released by Rhymesayers Entertainment.

== Discography ==
=== Studio albums ===
List of albums, with selected chart position
| Title | Album details | Peak chart position |
| Title | Album details | US |
|---|---|---|
| Malibu Ken (with Aesop Rock & TOBACCO) | Released: January 18, 2019; Label: Rhymesayers Entertainment; Format: CD, LP, digital download | 176 |

=== Singles ===
| Title | Year | Album |
|---|---|---|
| "Acid King" | 2018 | Malibu Ken |
| "Corn Maze" | 2018 | Malibu Ken |
