= Windshield Smasher =

Single by Black Moth Super Rainbow

from the album Cobra Juicy
- Released: August 28, 2012
- Genre: Psychedelic pop, neo-psychedelia, experimental, electronica
- Length: 25:21
- Label: Rad Cult
- Songwriter: Thomas Fec

Black Moth Super Rainbow singles chronology
"Born On a Day the Sun Didn't Rise" (2009)	"Windshield Smasher" (2012)

"Windshield Smasher" is the first single from psychedelic pop band Black Moth Super Rainbow's fifth album, Cobra Juicy. Black Moth Super Rainbow founder, Tobacco, released the song as a "90's-style maxi-single" containing remixes and b-sides.

== Background ==
The song was initially released via Tobacco's SoundCloud on July 24, 2012. During the first week of August, Tobacco confirmed remixes by surrealist prank caller Longmont Potion Castle, Odd Nosdam, Zackey Force Funk, Junk Culture and several others for the single. The release date and track listing were confirmed on August 7, 2012.

On August 21, 2012, a download of the EP was made available to Kickstarter backers. A CD edition limited to 500 copies was released through the official Rad Cult store.

== Music video ==
A music video for the single was released on August 7, 2012.

== Track listing ==
No.	Title	Length
1.	"Windshield Smasher" (Album version)	3:24
2.	"Windshield Smasher" (Odd Nosdam remix)	4:09
3.	"Windshield Smasher" (Junk Culture remix)	3:55
4.	"Windshield Smasher" (Longmont Potion Castle remix)	5:02
5.	"Windshield Smasher" (Zackey Force Funk remix)	3:25
6.	"The Runner" (B-side)	2:02
7.	"Windshield Smasher" (Instrumental)	3:27
Total length:		25:21
