= Cobra Juicy =

Album by Black Moth Super Rainbow

Studio album by Black Moth Super Rainbow
- Released: October 23, 2012
- Recorded: Early 2011 – May 26, 2012
- Genres: Indietronica, synth-pop, psychedelic pop, neo-psychedelia, electronic rock
- Length: 39:10
- Label: Rad Cult
- Producer: Tobacco

Black Moth Super Rainbow chronology
Eating Us (2009)	Cobra Juicy (2012)	Panic Blooms (2018)

Singles from Cobra Juicy
- 1. "Windshield Smasher" Released: August 28, 2012

Alternate Artwork

Professional ratings
Aggregate scores
Source	Rating
Metacritic	72/100
Review scores
Source	Rating
AllMusic	3.5/5 stars
Pitchfork	(7.6/10)
PopMatters	7/10 stars
Under the Radar	7/10 stars

Cobra Juicy is the fifth studio album by Pennsylvania based band Black Moth Super Rainbow. The album was released on October 23, 2012.

== Background ==
After the release of their album Eating Us in 2009, the band had begun work on their fifth album. It was scheduled to be released in 2011 under the name Psychic Love Damage, although it was later revealed by BMSR-member Tobacco that he had scrapped the album for finding it not worth the fans spending money on.

Towards the end of March 2012, a song titled "Like a Sundae" was released. On April 5, along with an announcement about the album release, a song called "Spraypaint" was revealed.

Several months later, the album cover was revealed and a limited t-shirt was printed featuring the image. On July 11, Tobacco started a Kickstarter page to fund the album. Black Moth Super Rainbow are releasing the album independently and set up a crowdfunding page to help fund the release. There are many price choices ranging from a $1 pledge for a digital download of the upcoming single to $10,000 for a rollerskating party to be DJ'd by Tobacco. The album will be printed in CD format and lenticular vinyl exclusive to backers. Along with most pledges is an included download of the scrapped Psychic Love Damage EP.

On July 12, 2012, the $45,000 goal was reached and a free download of a Psychic Love Damage track titled "The Wettest Day" was released to backers.

On July 30, 2012, the Kickstarter campaign reached $100,000, and Tobacco said that for reaching it, there will be a free remix album released to all backers in the first half of 2013.

He went on to confirm remixes of "Windshield Smasher" by surrealist prank caller Longmont Potion Castle, Odd Nosdam, Zackey Force Funk, Junk Culture and several others to be released along with the single in August 2012.

On August 7, 2012, a music video for "Windshield Smasher" was released. It was also confirmed that a "Windshield Smasher" maxi-single containing remixes and a b-side was released on August 28.

== Track listing ==
Track listing confirmed through official website

No.	Title	Length
1.	"Windshield Smasher"	3:24
2.	"Like a Sundae"	4:14
3.	"Hairspray Heart"	2:44
4.	"Psychic Love Damage"	3:34
5.	"We Burn"	3:46
6.	"Gangs In the Garden"	2:26
7.	"The Healing Power of Nothing"	3:09
8.	"I Think I'm Evil"	4:01
9.	"Dreamsicle Bomb"	3:21
10.	"Blurring My Day"	3:59
11.	"Spraypaint"	4:28

Kickstarter Mask Bonus Track
No.	Title	Length
12.	"The Softest Summer (Original I Think I'm Evil)"	2:56
