= The House of Apples and Eyeballs =

The House Of Apples & Eyeballs

Studio album by Black Moth Super Rainbow and The Octopus Project
- Released: October 31, 2006
- Genres: Psychedelic rock; electronica; experimental rock; indie rock; synth-pop
- Length: 36:15
- Label: Graveface

Black Moth Super Rainbow chronology
Start a People (2004)	The House of Apples and Eyeballs (2006)	Dandelion Gum (2007)

The Octopus Project chronology
One Ten Hundred Thousand Million (2005)	The House of Apples and Eyeballs (2006)	Hello, Avalanche (2007)

Professional ratings
Review scores
Source	Rating
AllMusic	4/5 stars

The House Of Apples & Eyeballs is a collaborative album by Black Moth Super Rainbow and the Octopus Project.

== Track listing ==
1. "Spiracle" – 3:51
2. "Marshmallow Window" – 1:55
3. "It Hurts to Shoot Lazers from Your Fingers, but It's Necessary" – 0:04
4. "Lollipopsichord" – 2:27
5. "Elq Milq" – 4:37
6. "All the Friends You Can Eat" – 2:07
7. "Copying Soup onto Sexy Birdy" – 0:29
8. "Psychic Swelling" – 2:37
9. "Lemon Lime Face" – 0:41
10. "Helium Tea" – 0:49
11. "Beds" – 1:40
12. "Runite Castles" – 3:39
13. "Tony Face" – 3:30
14. "Royal Firecracker Teeth" – 1:40
15. "Foxy and the Weight of the World" – 6:15
