= Start a People =

Studio album by Black Moth Super Rainbow
- Released: May 11, 2004
- Recorded: 2003
- Genres: Experimental; indie rock; synth-pop; neo-psychedelia; psychedelic pop
- Length: 39:23
- Labels: The 70s Gymnastics Recording Co. (original release), Graveface (reissue)

Black Moth Super Rainbow chronology
Falling Through a Field (2003)	Start a People (2004)	The House of Apples and Eyeballs (2006)

Professional ratings
Review scores
Source	Rating
AllMusic	3.5/5 stars

Start a People is the second studio album by the American psychedelic rock band Black Moth Super Rainbow, released in 2004. It is the band's fifth album if releases under the name Satanstompingcaterpillars are included in the chronology. "Vietcaterpillar" and "I Think It Is Beautiful You Are 256 Colors Too" are re-recordings of songs from their first album, Falling Through a Field.

"The Primary Color Movement", "Sadness in Her Hair", and "Snail Garden" were originally released in a Duotone Records collection titled Electric Avenue, Chapter 8.

== Track listing ==
1. "Raspberry Dawn" - 2:59
2. "Vietcaterpillar" - 2:15
3. "From the See" - 0:59
4. "I Am the Alphabet" - 0:57
5. "Seeeds" - 2:42
6. "I Think It Is Beautiful That You Are 256 Colors Too" - 3:06
7. "Count Backwards to Black" - 3:11
8. "Early 70's Gymnastics" - 3:41
9. "Snail Garden" - 1:50
10. "Folks with Magik Toes" - 0:27
11. "Trees and Colors and Wizards" - 2:28
12. "I Am the Alphabet" - 2:33
13. "1 2 3 of Me" - 3:20
14. "Hazy Field People" - 2:51
15. "Smile Heavy" - 2:36
16. "{Super Secret Track}" - 3:19

=== Expanded Edition ===
In 2007, Graveface Records re-released Start a People with added bonus tracks, under the title Start a People: Expanded Edition. These are tracks 16, 17 and 18 in the reissue:

1. "The Primary Color Movement"
2. "Sadness in Her Hair"
3. "Sun Stained Places"
- "{Super Secret Track}" on the original edition is basically the track "The Primary Color Movement" started late.

In 2024, Rad Cult released a 20th anniversary expanded edition of Start a People with outtakes and live recordings.
