= Dean Hsieh =

American artist, writer, and animator

Dean Hsieh is an American artist, writer, and animator.

== Career ==
=== Animation and film ===
In 2005, Hsieh worked as an animator for the feature film A Scanner Darkly. The film was directed by acclaimed director Richard Linklater based on influential sci-fi author Philip K. Dick's novel of the same name. Since its release, the film has gained a large cult following for its innovative use of rotoscope animation.

He worked with the co-director of Machete in Austin on concept art for a proposed film based on Metallica's music. He also created concept art for a proposed film based on the cult hit novel Tokyo Suckerpunch. He has also written several screenplays, one of which was a finalist in an Amazon Studios film contest.

Later he worked on the animated portion of the 2016 documentary film Tower, which tells the story of Charles Whitman's infamous 1966 UT Tower shootings from the survivors' viewpoints. The film was critically acclaimed and won several awards, including an Emmy for News & Documentary, Jury and Audience Awards at SXSW, and a Critics' Choice Documentary Award.

In 2018 and 2019, he worked as lead animator at Minnow Mountain to produce rotoscope animation for Undone, a new show from Amazon by the creators of BoJack Horseman. Upon release, season 1 of the series received near-universal critical acclaim and season 2 is now in the works.

In 2020, he began work as Character Animation Supervisor for Apollo 10 1/2: A Space Age Childhood, an original animated film by Richard Linklater. The movie premiered during SXSW 2022 and then released April 2022 on Netflix. It was widely acclaimed for its animation style and nostalgia-filled subjects. Later in the same month Undone season 2, which he also worked on as Character Animation Supervisor, was also released to positive critical reviews.

=== Comics ===
Hsieh began his career in comics when he was only sixteen and still in high school. After writing a negative letter to Revolutionary Comics's Rock 'N' Roll Comics, he was hired by the fledgling company to "produce comics and stories that reflected the hard edge of rock 'n' roll." He wrote and drew several stories featuring bands such Guns N' Roses, Mötley Crüe, Metallica, Rolling Stones, and AC/DC.

While in college, he began working on a new comic, Athena, which was originally featured in Antarctic Press's short-lived anthology series Absolute Zero. Hsieh and fellow creator Will Allison decided to start their own independent comic company, A.M.Works, in order to publish their creator-owned series Athena and Pervert Club. Hsieh's Athena, described as "full of intriguing situations and neat near-future science fiction," ran for fourteen issues and was collected into two graphic novels.

Antarctic Press released his next comic Westside which was a three-issue full-color mini-series Western story with an Asian twist. A special edition of the first issue comes with a CD soundtrack featuring local Austin bands and his own theme compositions.

In December 2008, Hsieh's entry Devil's Wake (originally titled Aeon of the Dead) won the monthly online contest sponsored by Zuda Comics, DC Comic's webcomic imprint. The full-color comic is written and digitally painted by Hsieh and ran for sixty pages on Zuda's website. Devil's Wake is available in digital format through the publishing website comiXology.

=== Music ===
Hsieh began playing guitar in the early nineties, and his band Teen Titans played "fast paced, nerd-core that looked up to the likes of the Pixies, Wire, and Huggy Bear." They released two 7" singles and were heavily involved in the local fanzine Peek-A-Boo, which later became Peek-A-Boo Records.

His next garage rock band, The 1-4-5s, released a debut single on Peek-a-Boo Records and was then signed to Estrus Records. Their first full-length, Rock Invasion, was released on Estrus. They released numerous 7" singles and toured the West Coast. The band also found some success in Japan where they toured and played with fellow Japanese garage rockers The 5.6.7.8's and Supersnazz. The band broke up shortly after releasing the 10" Rock 'N Roll Spook Party on Estrus.

After the 1-4-5s broke up, Hsieh formed a new garage rock band, The Wontons. They played for several years and toured America and Japan. The Wontons released several 7" singles under different record labels and contributed to numerous compilations. Their only full-length album, Hex Appeal, was released by Bloody Banner Records.

In December 1999, he was a part of Golden Millennium, a glam-rock supergroup featuring fellow Austin musicians from Spoon, The Kiss Offs, and Silver Scooter. He also played in the short-lived electro-punk band The Weirding.
