= Black Moth Super Rainbow =

American experimental electronic project

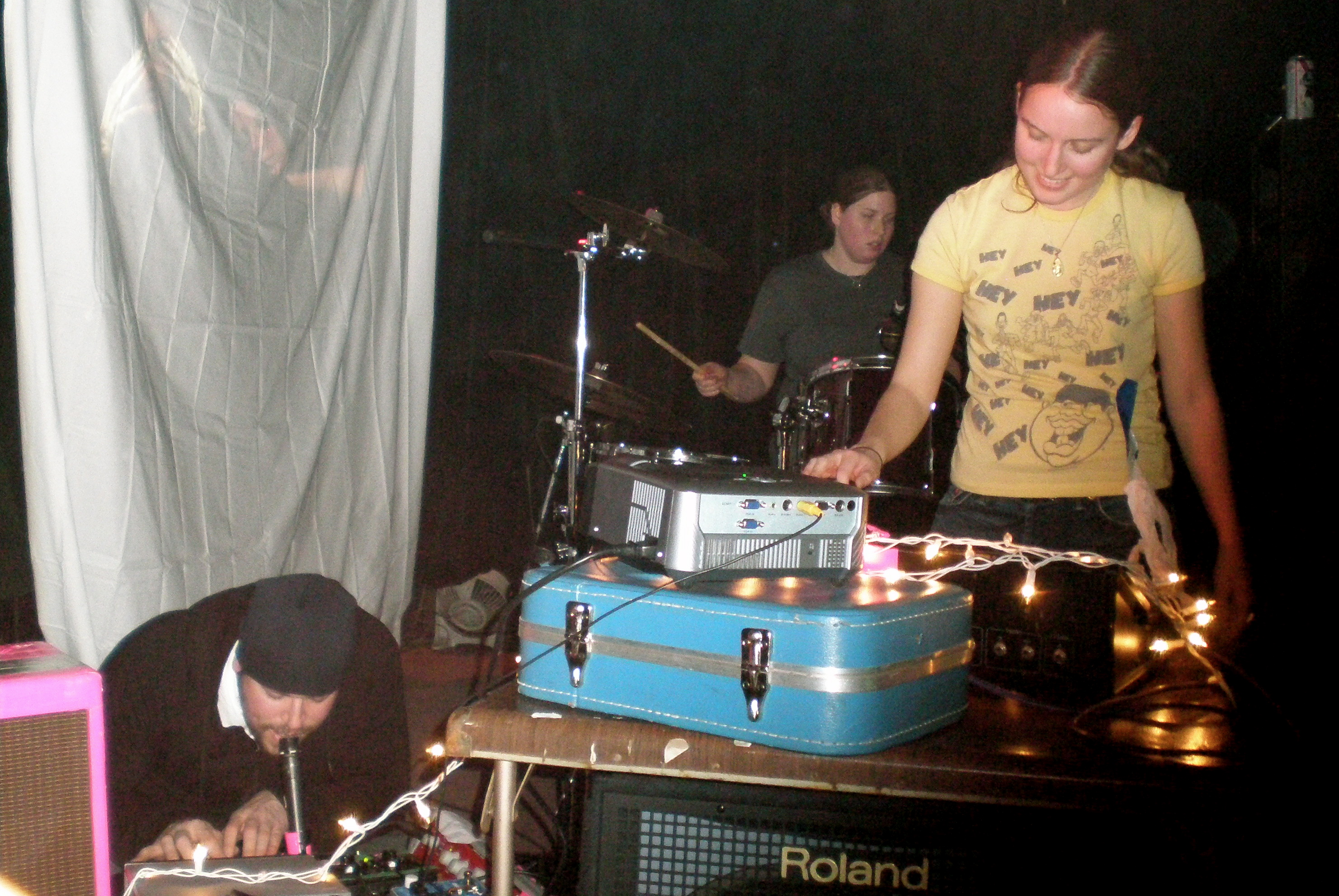
- Black Moth Super Rainbow performing live in Minneapolis, Minnesota

Background information
- Also known as: Satanstompingcaterpillars; BMSR
- Origin: Pittsburgh, Pennsylvania, US
- Genres: Indietronica; lo-fi; experimental; psychedelia; synth-pop; folktronica; IDM; ambient techno
- Years active: 2001–present
- Label: Rad Cult
- Members: Tobacco; The Seven Fields of Aphelion; Iffernaut; Pony Diver; Steve SLV
- Past members: Father Hummingbird; Power Pill Fist; Ryan Manon
- Website: www.blackmothsuperrainbow.com

Black Moth Super Rainbow (occasionally abbreviated as BMSR) is an American psychedelic electronic indie rock project from Pittsburgh, Pennsylvania, US. BMSR is a solo music project created by Thomas Fec, who is also known as Tobacco. Fec writes, records, and produces the work of BMSR independently. In live performances, it features members Tobacco, whose vocals are altered via a vocoder, synth players The Seven Fields of Aphelion and Pony Diver, drummer Iffernaut, and bassist STV SLV.

== Style ==
Black Moth Super Rainbow's music contains elements of psychedelia, folk, electronica, pop, and rock. Their distinctive sound is characterized by analog electronic instruments including the vocoder, Rhodes piano and Novatron.

A Graveface insert included inside the album Dandelion Gum describes them as such: "Deep in the woods of western Pennsylvania vocoders hum amongst the flowers and synths bubble under the leaf-strewn ground while flutes whistle in the wind and beats bounce to the soft drizzle of a warm acid rain. As the sun peeks out from between the clouds, the organic aural concoction of Black Moth Super Rainbow starts to glisten above the trees."

When comparing BMSR with Tobacco, the former tends to be accessible and overall pop friendly with more tangible lyrical themes. Tobacco on the other hand, while using the same core instruments, tends to be more experimental and abrasive, often featuring songs that have been sonically mutilated. More differences come to light in the live performance, where BMSR has typically featured a full band, Tobacco has been a more stripped down performance with less live instrumentation.

== History ==
When prompted on the origin of BMSR, frontman Tobacco stated the following:

I had started off really noisy and abstract with Allegheny White Fish. We were all so happy with ourselves for coming up with that name in 10th grade, but it wasn’t too funny 4 years later. Then ssc [satanstompingcaterpillars] was like my way to be more melodic all the time, and a little more serious. Then when it started to shift again into something I might be a little more comfortable performing live, I brought in the rest of the band and we changed over again. I’ve always felt like these ideas shouldn’t outstay their welcome. 3 or 4 records is enough, because I get really bored, and I like to keep these bands and ideas as pure as I can, in their places in time, until it seems like I’ve finally gotten it right.

From 1996 to 2000, musician Tobacco, along with other musicians, worked on and recorded songs for the Allegheny White Fish Tapes. When former member Power Pill Fist joined, a side project called satanstompingcaterpillars was born and became active from 2000 to 2002. Under the project, the members self-released their music on different labels, including Fuckeroo and Side 8. After their third album, The Most Wonderfulest Thing in 2002, the newly banded together musicians added three members, Father Hummingbird, The Seven Fields of Aphelion and Iffernaut. They changed their name to Black Moth Super Rainbow (BMSR) in 2003. Tobacco and BMSR are both active today.

BMSR began releasing their music on The 70's Gymnastics Recording Company, which is the band's own imprint. It is characterized by a tree-person jumping rope in a dress. Black Moth Super Rainbow's first album Falling Through a Field serves as a best-of collection for satanstompingcaterpillars.

After 2005, Graveface picked them up with Lost, Picking Flowers in the Woods and bonus reissued versions of their first two albums.

The group's third album Dandelion Gum was released in 2007. The LP is their most commercially and critically successful release. With it came their first music video for the track "Sun Lips."

On November 4, 2008, BMSR released Drippers. The EP not only includes new tracks like "Happy Melted City" and "Milk Skates" but also features some lost tracks from the Dandelion Gum era such as "We Are the Pagans" and "One Day I Had an Extra Toe." The release also features Mike Watt and BMSR's first official remix of Laura Burhenn's song "Just for the Night." Along with Drippers, the band released Bonus Drippers for MP3 download on their Myspace, which includes older tracks, unreleased tracks and bonus tracks like "The Dark Forest Joggers," a Dandelion Gum vinyl exclusive, "Side 9," a studio version of the Lost, Picking Flowers in the Woods vinyl bonus demo, or "Melting in the Meadow," a Start a People outtake track.

Their fourth album Eating Us was released on May 26, 2009. Around the end of the year, Rad Cult re-published The Autumn Kaleidoscope Got Changed by satanstompingcaterpillars.

On January 12, 2012, Tobacco posted via his Facebook account that a BMSR album entitled Psychic Love Damage had been recorded, but scrapped soon after completion. According to Tobacco, "it was supposed to come out this year, but it wasn't very exciting. and not good enough in my opinion for you to spend your $ on. so i junked it for its best moments and made an album that i'm really in love with." He went on to state that although scrapped, a new BMSR album was slated for release in the near future, possibly in the summer. He also stated he would be releasing many of his favorite scrapped pieces through his soundcloud account.

On April 5, 2012, Tobacco posted news on the BMSR website confirming the next album's release date. The announcement arrived alongside the release of a single titled "Spraypaint" to promote the untitled new album.

On July 10, 2012, Tobacco created a Kickstarter campaign to fund the release of their newly announced album Cobra Juicy. Different donation ranges contain different prizes, beginning with $1 for a digital download of the upcoming single "Windshield Smasher" to $10,000 for a rollerskating party in Pennsylvania to be DJ'd by Tobacco. Most prizes contain CDs, LPS, or digital downloads of the new album. The abandoned Psychic Love Damage EP served as a bonus prize.

On May 4, 2018, the project's 6th album Panic Blooms was released and their first album to chart on Billboard's Top 100 sales, as well as #1 on the Heatseeker chart.

On June 6, 2025, BMSR's seventh album Soft New Magic Dream was released.

== Live performance ==
BMSR has appeared at the WIDR Barking Tuna, Sasquatch! Music Festival, South by Southwest and several other festivals. On March 17, 2007, they played alongside The Octopus Project as one band at the South by Southwest music festival, playing music from their collaborative project, The House of Apples and Eyeballs. BMSR opened for The Flaming Lips on their Fall 2007 tour. The band performed at the 2008 SXSW music festival in a badges and wristbands only, packed-to-capacity show at The Thirsty Nickel. The band's 2009 tour featured a video introduction created by Eric Wareheim. Mike Watt also occasionally joined the band on stage to play bass during this tour.

The band supported Nine Inch Nails on their 2018 European Tour, with member TOBACCO opening for them on their US shows.

== Solo projects ==
Several members of BMSR have embarked on solo work and side-projects outside of the band.

Frontman Tobacco released his debut studio album, Fucked Up Friends, in 2008; the album featured a darker, harsher tone that took influence from instrumental hip-hop. The following year, he released The Allegheny White Fish Tapes, a collection of mixtapes and limited CDs that predate BMSR. In 2010, Tobacco released his second solo album Maniac Meat; the LP features vocals from Beck on two tracks, "Fresh Hex" and "Grape Aerosmith." In the same year, The Seven Fields of Aphelion released her debut solo album Periphery. TOBACCO's project was followed by two more releases: Ultima II Massage in 2014 and Sweatbox Dynasty in 2016.

== Discography ==
=== Studio albums ===
- Falling Through a Field (70s Gymnastics Recording Co., 2003)
- Start a People (70s Gymnastics Recording Co., 2004)
- Dandelion Gum (Graveface Records, 2007)
- Eating Us (Graveface Records, 2009)
- Cobra Juicy (Rad Cult, 2012)
- Panic Blooms (Rad Cult, 2018)
- Soft New Magic Dream (Rad Cult, 2025)

=== EPs ===
- Electric Avenue Chapter 8 (Duotone Records, 2003)
- Chinese Witch Guy with an Ax (70s Gymnastics Recording Co., 2004)
- Lost, Picking Flowers in the Woods (Graveface Records, 2005)
- Drippers (70s Gymnastics Recording Co., 2008)
- Bonus Drippers (self-released, 2008)
- Extra Flavor (Rad Cult, 2011)
- Psychic Love Damage (Rad Cult, 2012)
- Seefu Lilac (Rad Cult, 2016)

=== Singles ===
- "Zodiac Girls" (Suicide Squeeze Records, 2008)
- "Don't You Want to Be in a Cult" (Mexican Summer, 2009)
- "Born on a Day the Sun Didn't Rise" (Graveface Records, 2009)
- "Windshield Smasher" (Rad Cult, 2012)
- "Bad Fuckin Times" (Rad Cult, 2016) Split single with Freescha
- "Mr No One" (Rad Cult, 2018) Split single with Ariel Pink
- "Baby's in the Void" (Rad Cult, 2018) Split single with Alessandro Cortini
- "New Breeze" (Rad Cult, 2018) Split single with High Tides
- "Backwash" (Rad Cult, 2018) Split single with Mike Watt with Flea & K
- "Brain Waster" (Rad Cult, 2024)
- "All 2 of Us" (Rad Cult, 2024)
- "Demon's Glue" (Rad Cult, 2024)

=== Collaborations ===
- The House of Apples and Eyeballs (2006) - Split record with The Octopus Project

=== Compilations ===
- The Autumn Kaleidoscope Got Changed (Rad Cult, 2010) Reissue of an album and EP originally released under Satanstompingcaterpillars
