= Falling Through a Field =

Studio album by Black Moth Super Rainbow
- Released: April 10, 2003
- Genres: Experimental; indie rock; synth-pop; emo
- Length: 49:05
- Labels: The 70's Gymnastics Recording Co. (original release), Graveface (reissue)

Black Moth Super Rainbow chronology
Falling Through a Field (2003)	Start a People (2004)

Professional ratings
Review scores
Source	Rating
AllMusic	link

Falling Through a Field is the first studio album by the American psychedelic rock band Black Moth Super Rainbow, released in 2003. It is considered the band’s fourth album when releases under the name Satanstompingcaterpillars are included in the chronology. Some songs on the album originated from the Satanstompingcaterpillars era, including tracks like "The Autumn Kaleidoscope Got Changed" and "The Most Wonderfulest Thing".

== Track listing ==
1. "Vietcaterpillar" - 2:07
2. "I Think It Is Beautiful That You Are 256 Colors Too" - 2:21
3. "Season for Blooming" - 2:15
4. "Letter People Show" - 3:49
5. "Dandelion Graves" - 4:46
6. "Boxphones" - 2:44
7. "Smog in Cities" - 2:39
8. "Your Doppelganger" - 1:49
9. "Falling Through a Field" - 2:18
10. "Colorful Nickels" - 3:53
11. "One Flowery Sabbath" - 1:59
12. "Sun Organ" - 0:59
13. "Boatfriend" - 2:44
14. "The Magical Butterfly Net" - 2:36
15. "Last House in the Enchanted Forest" - 1:49
16. "Lake Feet" - 2:23
17. "Melody for Color Spectrum" - 8:02
- In original pressings, "Melody For Color Spectrum" was hidden from the track listing.

=== Expanded Edition ===
In 2007, Graveface Records re-released Falling Through a Field with added bonus tracks, under the title Falling Through a Field: Expanded Edition. These are tracks 18–23 in the reissue:

1. "Monohymn"
2. "The Sad Branch"
3. "Silo"
4. "Jogging Home"
5. "Aloysius Version Opposite B"
6. "Yourteethandface(Marchingalong)"
