= Exorcise Tape =

Studio album by Demon Queen
- Released: August 6, 2013
- Genres: Electro-funk; synth-funk; R&B; trap
- Length: 30:38
- Labels: Rad Cult, The Orchard
- Producer: Tobacco

Demon Queen chronology
Exorcise Tape (2013)	The Exorcise Tape Instrumentals (2015)

Tobacco chronology
LA UTI (2010)	Exorcise Tape (2013)	Ultima II Massage (2014)

Zackey Force Funk chronology
Zackey Force Funk (2011)	Exorcise Tape (2013)	Money Green Viper (2014)

Singles from Exorcise Tape
- 1. "Rude Boy" Released: April 23, 2013

Exorcise Tape is the debut album by Demon Queen, a duo consisting of Black Moth Super Rainbow frontman Tobacco and Tucson rapper Zackey Force Funk, released August 6, 2013, by Rad Cult Records and The Orchard. The album's instrumentals were released as The Exorcise Tape Instrumentals on June 2, 2015.

== Background ==
The two artists first met at a Black Moth Super Rainbow concert in San Francisco. The project was made remotely by the duo "sending files over the [internet] between Pittsburgh and Tucson", "writing a soundtrack conceived for a seedy strip club in Zackey Force Funk's neighborhood, a place where he imagined the dancers to be satanic (like the demon strippers in the Tarantino/Rodriguez film From Dusk till Dawn)." Tobacco described the project as "the first time I forced myself to step back a little, but it was maybe the easiest album I've been a part of. It just flowed." Per an interview with Vice's Troy Farah, Zackey says the album is mostly "about growing up around 29th Street [in Tucson], going to strip clubs, prison, that sort of thing", though because he felt he was "writing too much about gangsta shit", he "challenged himself and rewrote everything to be a littler weirder, a little more out there."

== Release ==
The album was first announced April 23, 2013, with an original release date of July 9. The announcement came along with lead single "Rude Boy" featuring Zackey's brother N8noface. Impose's Dayna Evans calls the track "a blend of hyperactive dance pulses, bass beats that meander, and a buzzsaw hitting you as hard as if it fell from a building on top of you" with "contributed rhymes from N8noface [which] are underwhelming, but if only because the remainder of the track is a tour de force in devilish beatstomping." An NSFW music video was released for "Demon Practice" on June 13, which Spin's Colin Stutz says portrays "evil [being] passed from person to person like a satanic game of tag" and calls the video "NSFW but it's also not suitable for those times you're home alone at night." Opening track "Lamborghini Meltdown" was previously released as a single for Tobacco's LA UTI EP in 2010. A music video was released for "Love Hour Zero" on September 17, starring a human breast which travels through the ocean, desert, and space.

== Style and reception ==
Exorcise Tape ratings
Review scores
Source	Rating
AllMusic	3.5/5 stars
Exclaim!	5/10
PopMatters	5/10
Tiny Mix Tapes	3/5 stars

Tiny Mix Tapes's Ben Rag writes that "Demon Queen take a humorously hypersexual approach to the demonic, similar to Grinderman's two releases, but with funk and hip-hop subbed for garage rock", bringing "leering masculinity taken to its extreme, crass and ridiculous and perhaps even pathetically cathartic." The album "showcases Tobacco's viscous analog synths and hip-hop vocals ... sadly, only present here in four of eleven songs" while "ZFF acts as both lecherous hook-singer and hookup man, and the guest rappers he provides from his crew sound especially at ease over Tobacco's bulging beats, which have long begged for the inclusion of an MC freakier than Beck." PopMatters's Chris Conaton says the album "grimy synth-funk / R&B / hip-hop with weird, catchy electronic backing tracks." Zackey "seems to drag the project down at nearly every turn" with a "falsetto [that] is thin at best and often gets buried underneath the layers of synth, and, when he can be heard, he's usually rambling on and on about pussy", but that "doesn't mean there's nothing of value" on the album, with Conaton specifically praising Tobacco's "fine production work" and saying that songs improve "whenever guest rappers show up".

Exclaim!'s Daniel Sylvester writes "Filling the album with N.W.A. references, guest raps from Zackey's Machina Muerte compadres and countless references to tits and ass, Exorcise Tapes manages to recycle musical puns and then proceeds to endlessly check back in with you to see if you still 'get it.'" AllMusic's Jason Lymangrover writes that with "hyper-sexualized lyrics and grimy trap beats, the two succeed in making something that nearly hits the mark, with musical ties to Salem's sinister witch house and XXYYXX's druggy, lo-fi brand of experimental bass music." Spin's Chris Martins notes "Puni Nani" which "digs up some vintage Prince and doesn't bother to dust off the grit", "Bad Route" which "sounds like abstracted, acid-addled G-funk, and "Love Hour Zero" which "makes like Boards of Canada on ecstasy", calling the album a "warped electro-funk opus" and "some freaky stuff worthy of your ears' attention." Mxdwn.com's April Siese notes that "unlike trashy production compatriots Wallpaper, Demon Queen's sleazy mix of vulgar lyrics and party-happy samples function sincerely rather than as a cheeky nod to the YOLO culture plaguing most contemporary dance music today", and calls the project "a respectable concept album fit for the finest strip club in all of Tucson, but if you've come to the Exorcise Tape to truly work it out, you may encounter a few issues along the way."

== Track listing ==
All tracks are written by Thomas Fec and Zachary Hose.

Exorcise Tape track listing
No.	Title	Length
1.	"Lamborghini Meltdown"	2:53
2.	"Vodka" (featuring Chuck Steaks and Joe1)	2:53
3.	"El Camino 2"	1:58
4.	"Swoll Tongue"	3:15
5.	"The 5th Beat"	2:25
6.	"Demon Practice" (featuring N8noface)	2:09
7.	"Love Hour Zero"	3:29
8.	"Puni Nani"	2:30
9.	"Rude Boy" (featuring N8noface)	3:13
10.	"Bad Route"	3:54
11.	"Despise the Lie" (featuring Isaiah Toothtaker)	1:59
Total length:		30:38

== Personnel ==
- Tobacco – rap, vocoder, synthesizers, production
- Zackey Force Funk – rap
- Chuck Steaks – rap (track 2)
- Joe1 – rap (track 2)
- N8noface – rap (tracks 6 and 9)
- Isaiah Toothtaker – rap (track 11)
