= Eating Us =

Studio album by Black Moth Super Rainbow
- Released: May 26, 2009
- Length: 35:45
- Label: Graveface
- Producer: Dave Fridmann

Black Moth Super Rainbow chronology
Drippers (2008)	Eating Us (2009)	Cobra Juicy (2012)

Professional ratings
Review scores
Source	Rating
AllMusic	3.5/5 stars
cokemachineglow	(7.4/10)
Okayplayer	(88/100)
The Phoenix	3/4 stars
Pitchfork	(6.1/10)
PopMatters	6/10 stars
Prefix	(7.5/10)
Rolling Stone	3/5 stars
Spin	3.5/5 stars

Eating Us is the fourth studio album by Pennsylvania based band Black Moth Super Rainbow released on May 26, 2009, on the CD format. With a running time of just under 36 minutes, it is the shortest full-length release by the band to date. The album was released in a limited-edition "hairy" version, in which the CD case is stored inside a bag made of synthetic hair. The "hairy" version was sold out before the album was even released due to pre-orders. After many delays, Eating Us was released in a 180 gram "Audiophile" edition on black vinyl on April 6, 2010. A Double LP version, limited to 1000 copies, was released April 17, 2010, on Record Store Day. The Double LP is on Amber 150 gram vinyl with foil prints on sides b and d. Both LP versions come in Stoughton gatefold packaging done with foil printing.

BMSR leader Tobacco has noted his dissatisfaction with the album, stating that the majority of the songs were "90% done" and that producer Dave Fridmann "totally polished a turd." However, he also listed "Twin of Myself" and "Tooth Decay" as two of his favorite BMSR songs.

== Track listing ==
1. "Born on a Day the Sun Didn't Rise" - 3:44
2. "Dark Bubbles" - 3:08
3. "Twin of Myself" - 3:23
4. "Gold Splatter" - 4:17
5. "Iron Lemonade" - 3:24
6. "Tooth Decay" - 3:15
7. "Fields Are Breathing" - 3:32
8. "Smile the Day After Today" - 2:35
9. "The Sticky" - 2:15
10. "Bubblegum Animals" - 1:42
11. "American Face Dust" - 3:26
12. "Untitled Hidden Track" - 1:32

== LP track listing ==
Side 1:

1. "Born on a Day the Sun Didn't Rise"
2. "The Sticky"
3. "Tooth Decay"
4. "Gold Splatter"
5. "Fields Are Breathing"
6. "American Face Dust"

Side 2:

1. "Twin of Myself"
2. "Smile the Day After Today"
3. "Dark Bubbles"
4. "Bubblegum Animals"
5. "Iron Lemonade"
6. "Carpet" (LP exclusive)
