= Power Pill Fist =

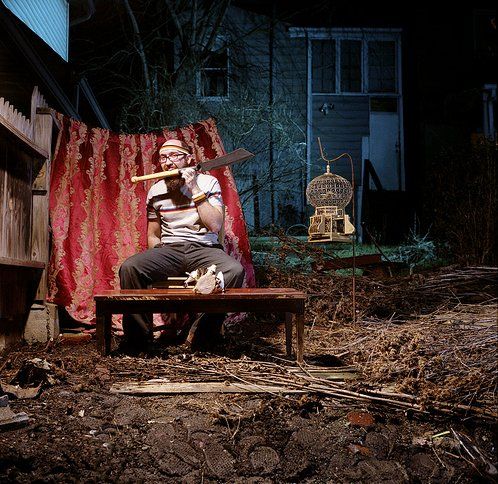

Background information
- Born: Ken Fec
- Origin: Pittsburgh, Pennsylvania, U.S.
- Genres: Experimental; noise rock; electronica
- Years active: 2004–present
- Labels: i, Absentee
- Formerly of: Black Moth Super Rainbow
- Website: Official website

Ken Fec, known by his stage name Power Pill Fist, is an Atari noise rock artist from Pittsburgh, PA. He was the bassist for the experimental band Black Moth Super Rainbow from its beginnings in 1999 to 2009. Beginning in 2004, Ken Fec started experimenting with the Atari 2600 and the Synthcart cartridge created by Paul Slocum. His music is a mixture of bass, acoustic guitar and Atari synth.

His first album, Extra Life, was reviewed by Aquarius Records, Empty Free and SCTAS, among others. Reviews for his second album, KONGMANIVONG, reached much broader horizons with MXDWN stating "Noise at its best!" and other reviews by Scratch Records, Music Geek and Punk News to name a few. In 2008, his song "Vile", from KONGMANIVONG, was positively reviewed by URB Magazine, who featured Power Pill Fist as an up-and-coming artist in their "Next 1000" article.

Power Pill Fist played at the South By Southwest music conference in 2007 and 2008, as well as the MACRoCk (Mid Atlantic Radio Conference) in 2009, in addition to extensively touring the United States.

== Discography ==
=== Full-length albums ===
Year	Name	Format	Label	Runtime
2005	Extra Life	CD	Graveface Records	29:00
2007	KONGMANIVONG	CD	Graveface Records	42:16
2014	Werebeard	Cassette	i, Absentee	51:14

=== EP Versus series ===
For each disc in the "Versus" series, according to Power Pill Fist's official website, "an opponent challenges PPF to a live melodic duel which is cut down to a "best of" and released on 3" CD-R to only the first (100) fans."

Year	Name	Format	Runtime
2004	Chinese Witch Guy With An Ax (vs. Black Moth Super Rainbow)	CD-R	14:54
2006	Thoust Pain Is Thine Angre (vs. Bony Legs)	CD-R	21:42
2008	White Noise Fury (vs. Dorosoto)	CD-R	23:20
2009	Byte Marks (vs. Mall Security)	CD-R	19:00
2014	Basaltic Day Terrors (vs. VFKR)	CD-R	23:28
