= Identification Parade =

Studio album by The Octopus Project
- Released: April 16, 2002
- Genre: Indie rock, electronica
- Length: 43:50
- Label: Peek-A-Boo Records
- Producer: The Octopus Project

The Octopus Project chronology
Identification Parade (2002)	One Ten Hundred Thousand Million (2005)

Professional ratings
Review scores
Source	Rating
AllMusic	3.5/5 stars
Exclaim!	(favorable)

Identification Parade is the first studio album by indietronica band The Octopus Project. It was released April 16, 2002 on Peek-A-Boo Records.

== Track listing ==
1. "What They Found" – 3:04
2. "Rorol" – 4:55
3. "The Way Things Go" – 7:02
4. "Righteous Ape and Bird" – 4:56
5. "Marshall Examines His Carcass" – 3:03
6. "Its Caption Was a Star" – 4:13
7. "Crying at the Aquarium" – 5:55
8. "Porno Disaster" – 2:29
9. "Hypnopaedia" – 8:18

Notes

- "Its Caption Was a Star", "Righteous Ape & Bird" and "Hypnopaedia" were originally on the Christmas on Mars - EP
- "What They Found" has a music video.
