= Soft New Magic Dream =

Studio album by Black Moth Super Rainbow
- Released: June 6, 2025
- Length: 39:54
- Label: Rad Cult

Black Moth Super Rainbow chronology
Panic Blooms (2018)	Soft New Magic Dream (2025)

Singles from Soft New Magic Dream
- 1. "Brain Waster" Released: June 28, 2024; 2. "All 2 of Us" Released: August 23, 2024; 3. "Demon's Glue" Released: October 25, 2024; 4. "Open the Fucking Fantasy" Released: March 7, 2025; 5. "Unknown Potion" Released: April 23, 2025

Soft New Magic Dream is the seventh studio album by American psychedelic electronic indie rock project Black Moth Super Rainbow. It was released on June 6, 2025, via Rad Cult in LP, CD and digital formats.

The album, released seven years after the band's 2018 full-length release, Panic Blooms, consists of ten songs with a total runtime of approximately forty minutes. "Open the Fucking Fantasy" was released as a single on March 7, 2025. It was preceded by "All 2 of Us", a single released in 2024.

== Reception ==
Professional ratings
Review scores
Source	Rating
AllMusic	4/5 stars
Narc	3/5
Pitchfork	6.6/10
Spectrum Culture	60%

Spectrum Culture's Holly Hazelwood described Soft New Magic Dream as "an album that felt purposefully sedate at times," commenting that it "is not a switchblades-in-pockets kind of album. In most ways, it picks up almost exactly where they left off with 2018's Panic Blooms."

The album received a rating of 6.6 from Pitchfork, whose reviewer Samuel Hyland remarked, "While Soft New Magic Dream largely re-hashes the Black Moth Super Rainbow formula, it also occasionally manages to find new colors in old constraints—not abandoning their schtick, but not copy-pasting it either." In a four-star review for AllMusic, Tim Sendra observed that "Instead of murk and grime, the songs are almost pretty. The synths have a glistening sheen to them, the vocals are almost lilting, and the melodies throughout are soft and dreamy for the most part."

Robin Webb of Narc assigned the album a rating of three, referring to it as "an oozing, synthy new album with hip-hop rhythms by blurry, neon pop dream band." Writing for Mxdwn, Elliot Wilson noted, "In ten tracks, BMSR manages to deliver an experience that's best analogized as being like a slow dance in an underground lake – as surreal and artificial as it is bouncing and romantic."

== Track listing ==
Soft New Magic Dream track listing
No.	Title	Length
1.	"Open the Fucking Fantasy"	4:00
2.	"All 2 of Us"	4:09
3.	"Tastebud"	3:01
4.	"Demon's Glue"	5:09
5.	"The Dripping Royalty"	3:14
6.	"Brain Waster"	3:41
7.	"The Eyes in Season"	5:13
8.	"Unknown Potion"	4:17
9.	"Wet Spot Dare"	2:59
10.	"Sea of Hair"	4:11
Total length:		39:54
