= Hello, Avalanche =

Studio album by The Octopus Project
- Released: October 9, 2007
- Genre: Indietronica; disco-punk; Nintendocore; instrumental
- Length: 43:12
- Label: Peek-A-Boo Records

The Octopus Project chronology
One Ten Hundred Thousand Million (2005)	Hello, Avalanche (2007)	Hexadecagon (2010)

Professional ratings
Review scores
Source	Rating
AllMusic	link
Drowned in Sound	8/10 link
Pitchfork Media	7.5/10 link
PopMatters	7/10 link
Tiny Mix Tapes	4/5 link

Hello, Avalanche is the third studio album of American indietronica band The Octopus Project, released on October 9, 2007, on Peek-A-Boo Records.

== Track listing ==
No.	Title	Length
1.	"Snow Tip Cap Mountain"	2:14
2.	"Truck"	2:09
3.	"Bees Bein' Strugglin'"	3:48
4.	"An Evening With Rthrtha"	3:16
5.	"Black Blizzard / Red Umbrella"	3:06
6.	"Upmann"	3:59
7.	"Mmaj"	4:06
8.	"I Saw the Bright Shinies"	3:58
9.	"Ghost Moves"	3:31
10.	"Vanishing Lessons"	3:17
11.	"Exploding Snowhorse"	3:47
12.	"Loud Murmuring"	3:30
13.	"Queen"	2:25
