= Fever Forms =

Studio album by The Octopus Project
- Released: July 9, 2013
- Genre: Experimental pop
- Length: 38:54
- Label: Peek-A-Boo

The Octopus Project chronology
Hexadecagon (2010)	Fever Forms (2013)	Memory Mirror (2017)

Professional ratings
Aggregate scores
Source	Rating
Metacritic	83/100
Review scores
Source	Rating
AllMusic	4.0/5 stars
Consequence of Sound	3.5/5 stars
PopMatters	7/10 stars

Fever Forms is the fifth studio album by American indietronica band The Octopus Project, released on July 9, 2013, on Peek-A-Boo Records.

== Track listing ==
No.	Title	Length
1.	"The Falls"	3:05
2.	"Pyramid Kosmos"	5:12
3.	"Whitby"	2:35
4.	"Death Graduates"	3:08
5.	"The Mythical E.L.C."	3:50
6.	"Unspool"	0:48
7.	"Mmkit"	2:56
8.	"The Man with the Golden Hand"	2:48
9.	"Perhap"	4:31
10.	"Choi Sighs"	2:19
11.	"Deep Spice"	3:02
12.	"Sharpteeth"	4:31
