= David Zellner =

American film director, screenwriter, and actor

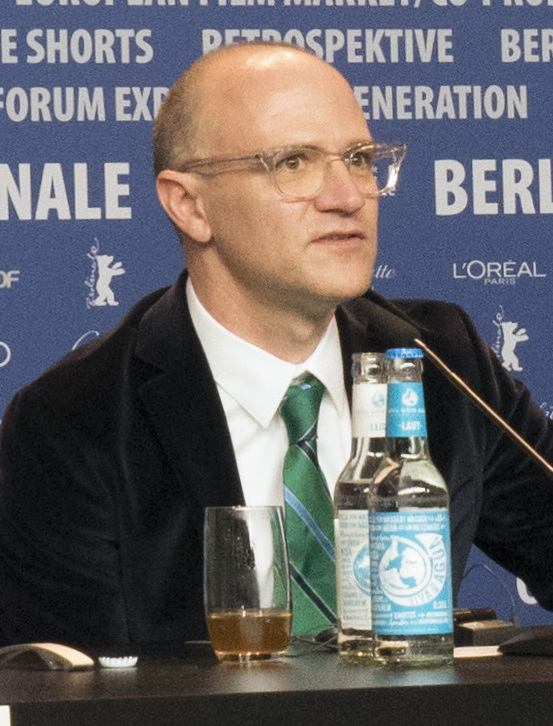
- David Zellner at Berlinale 2018
- Born: Greeley, Colorado, United States
- Occupations: Film director, screenwriter, actor
- Years active: 1997–present

David Zellner is an American film director, screenwriter and actor. He is best known for directing the films Kid-Thing (2012), Kumiko, the Treasure Hunter (2014), and Damsel (2018).

== Career ==
David Zellner started his career by studying at the University of Texas film school and then staged exclusively Independent feature films and short films. He always works together with his younger brother Nathan Zellner under the name Zellner Bros.

Zellner's short film Sasquatch Birth Journal 2 (2010) got into the Sundance Film Festival in 2011 and was nominated for the Sundance Short Filmmaking Award that year.

For his feature film, Kid-Thing (2012), which he directed and wrote, Zellner won a Best Film award from the 2012 Gen Art Film Festival. Kid-Thing also received second place in the 2012 Village Voice Film Poll for "Best Undistributed Film."

For his feature film Kumiko, the Treasure Hunter (2014), starring Oscar-nominated actress Rinko Kikuchi, which he directed and acted in, and co-wrote with his brother Nathan Zellner, he won a Best Director Jury Prize award at the 2014 Fantasia Film Festival. The film also won an Audience Award for Best Film and Special Jury Award at the 2014 Las Palmas Film Festival. At the 2014 Little Rock Film Festival, the film won the Golden Rock Narrative Award for Best Feature Film, and at the 2014 Sundance Film Festival, the film won a U.S. Dramatic Special Jury Award for Musical Score (by The Octopus Project) and was also nominated for the U.S. Grand Jury Dramatic Prize. Furthermore, at the 2014 Nantucket Film Festival, David and his brother Nathan won the Showtime Tony Cox Award for Best Screenwriting in a Feature Film for their screenplay Kumiko. Kumiko also won a "Most Original Film" award at the Toronto After Dark Film Festival. David was nominated for a Best Director Independent Spirit Award in 2014 for directing the film, with lead actress Rinko Kikuchi who was nominated for a Best Female Lead Actress Independent Spirit Award.

In 2018, Zellner released Damsel, a black comedy Western starring Robert Pattinson and Mia Wasikowska and codirected and cowritten with his brother. It was their widest-release and highest-budget movie to date. The film tells the story of a pioneer on the American frontier seeking to rescue his would-be-bride from an apparent kidnapping. Damsel received largely positive reviews. On review aggregator website Rotten Tomatoes, the film holds an approval rating of 68% based on 117 reviews, and an average rating of 6.4/10. The website's critical consensus reads, "The beautifully filmed Damsel injects the western genre with a welcome dose of humor and some unexpected twists, although its stately pace may frustrate impatient viewers."

Zellner then appeared as an actor in Riley Stearns' 2019 black comedy martial arts film The Art of Self-Defense, playing opposite Jesse Eisenberg.

In 2022, IndieWire described the Zellner brothers as having two projects in development: an as-yet-untitled sasquatch film (later revealed to have been titled Sasquatch Sunset) that would star Jesse Eisenberg as Bigfoot, and a science fiction film titled Alpha Gang starring Nicholas Hoult and Jon Hamm, about aliens deciding whether to invade Earth.

== Personal life ==
David Zellner and his brother Nathan have been based in Austin, Texas for more than 20 years.

== Filmography ==
=== Feature films ===
Year	Title	Director	Writer	Notes
1997	Plastic Utopia	Yes	Yes	Also producer and editor
2001	Frontier	Yes	Yes	
2008	Goliath	Yes	Yes	
2009	Cinemad Mix Tape #1	Yes	No	
2010	Hexadecagon	Yes	No	
2011	Slacker 2011	Yes	No	Segment "Boyfriends"
2012	Kid-Thing	Yes	Yes	
2014	Kumiko, the Treasure Hunter	Yes	Yes	
2018	Damsel	Yes	Yes	Co-directed with Nathan Zellner
2024	Sasquatch Sunset	Yes	Yes	Co-directed with Nathan Zellner
2026	Alpha Gang	Yes	Yes	Co-directed with Nathan Zellner; Post-production

==== As actor ====
Year	Title	Role	Notes
1997	Plastic Utopia	James	
1998	The Curve	Deadhead #1	
2001	Frontier	Officer	
2002	I Love You	Man	
2004	Dear Pillow	Phone Man #1	Voice
2004	Oh My God	Witness	
2006	The Cassidy Kids	Cat Burglar	
2008	Untitled (Thanks, Get in...)	The Star	
2008	Baghead	Festivalgoer	
2009	Cinemad Mix Tape #1	Australian Priest	
2009	Beeswax	Scott	
2010	Tug	Geno	
2010	Shit Year	Hal Ashland	
2011	Slacker 2011	Kid with Soda #1	Segment: "Boyfriends"
2012	Kid-Thing	Caleb	
2013	Ain't Them Bodies Saints	Zellner	
2013	Love & Air Sex	Cab Driver	
2014	Dignity	Lamb	
2014	Kumiko, the Treasure Hunter	Deputy	
2014	Faults	Restaurant Manager	
2015	There	Thrill	
2018	Damsel	Parson Henry	
2018	Ghostbox Cowboy	Jimmy Van Horn	
2019	The Art of Self-Defense	Henry	

=== Short films ===
Year	Title	Director	Writer
2003	Rummy	Yes	No
2004	The Virile Man	Yes	Yes
2004	Quasar Hernandez	Yes	Yes
2005	Foxy and the Weight of the World	Yes	Yes
2005	Flotsam/Jetsam	Yes	Yes
2005	Who Is On First?	Yes	No
2006	Redemptitude	Yes	Yes
2007	Aftermath on Meadowlark Lane	Yes	Yes
2010	Sasquatch Birth Journal 2	Yes	Yes

==== As actor ====
Year	Title	Role
2003	The Meat Market	Maynard Rollins
2003	Rummy	Sam
2004	The Virile Man	Gary
2006	Redemptitude	Preacher
2008	Pardon My Downfall	

=== Television ===
Year	Title	Note
2023	The Curse	3 episodes

=== Web series ===
Year	Title	Director	Writer	Notes
2009	FIDDLESTIXX	Yes	Yes	3 episodes

==== As actor ====
Year	Title	Role	Notes
2004	The Strangerhood	Sam	Voice
2005	P.A.N.I.C.S.	Frank	Voice
2008	Red vs. Blue: Reconstruction	PFL Troop	Voice
2010	Rooster Teeth Shorts	Businessman	

=== Music videos ===
Director

- The Precarious Warehaüs Dwellers – "Nutella and Gummi Bear Sandwich" (2002)
- The Octopus Project – "Truck" (2007)
- Ola Podrida – "This Old World" (2009)
- The Octopus Project – "Wet Gold" (2009)
- Peelander-Z – "Star Bowling" (2012)

Cinematographer

- Fever Forms – "Sharpteeth" (2013)
