= Peel (Texas band) =

- Origin: Austin, Texas, U.S.
- Genres: Experimental; Pop; Indie
- Years active: 2004–2009
- Label: Peek-A-Boo
- Members: Josh Permenter; Dakota Smith; Allison Moore; Michael Rogers; Anthony Castañeda
- Website: Official website

Peel is an American indie rock band based in Austin, Texas that was active between 2004–2009. They released the album Peel, in 2007, and the five song EP August Exhaust Pipes, in 2008.

== Founding Members ==
- Josh Permenter: guitar, vocals
- Dakota Smith: guitar, vocals
- Allison Moore: keyboards, vocals
- Derrick Chaney: Drums

== Other Members ==
- Michael Rogers: bass
- Christie Chaone: bass
- Anthony Castañeda: drums
- James Vehslage: drums

== Discography ==
=== Albums ===
- Peel (2007) Peek a Boo Records

EPs

- August Exhaust Pipes (2008)

== See also ==
- Music of Austin
