= Hexadecagon (album) =

Studio album by The Octopus Project
- Released: October 26, 2010
- Genre: Indietronica
- Length: 48:34
- Label: Peek-A-Boo

The Octopus Project chronology
Hello, Avalanche (2007)	Hexadecagon (2010)	Fever Forms (2013)

Professional ratings
Review scores
Source	Rating
AllMusic	4.5/5 stars
The A.V. Club	B−
Consequence of Sound	B
Pitchfork	4.6/10

Hexadecagon is a studio album by the electronic band the Octopus Project. It was released in 2010 by Peek-A-Boo Records.

== Critical reception ==
The Austin Chronicle called Hexadecagon "a concept album that's actually fun to indulge," writing that it "finds [the band] diving headlong into unexplored realms (the 11-minute 'Circling'), and sounding more thoughtful, less cartoonish." Spin wrote: "Hexadecagon is the Tubular Bells of the 8-bit generation, and that’s a compliment."

== Track listing ==
No.	Title	Length
1.	"Fuguefat"	3:36
2.	"Korakrit"	4:33
3.	"A Phantasy"	6:58
4.	"Circling"	10:57
5.	"Toneloop"	3:14
6.	"Glass Jungle"	4:54
7.	"Hallucinists"	6:29
8.	"Catalog"	7:49
