= Ultima II Massage =

Studio album by Tobacco
- Released: May 13, 2014
- Genre: Electronic
- Length: 44:17
- Label: Ghostly International
- Producer: Tobacco

Tobacco chronology
| Exorcise Tape (2013) | Ultima II Massage (2014) | Sweatbox Dynasty (2016) |

Professional ratings
Aggregate scores
| Source | Rating |
|---|---|
| AnyDecentMusic? | 7.1/10 |
| Metacritic | 73/100 |
Review scores
| Source | Rating |
| AllMusic | 4/5 stars |
| Consequence of Sound | C+ |
| DIY | 3/5 stars |
| Exclaim! | 7/10 |
| The Line of Best Fit | 7/10 |
| Louder Than War | 9/10 |
| NME | 3.5/5 stars |
| Pitchfork | 6.9/10 |
| The Skinny | 5/5 stars |
| Uncut | 7/10 |

Ultima II Massage is the third studio album by Black Moth Super Rainbow frontman Tobacco. It was released through Ghostly International on May 13, 2014. The record is mainly rock/electronic, with songs being mainly instrumentals.

== Critical reception ==
At Metacritic, which assigns a weighted average score out of 100 to reviews from mainstream critics, Ultima II Massage received an average score of 73 out of 100 based on 13 reviews, indicating "generally favorable reviews".

== Track listing ==
| No. | Title | Length |
|---|---|---|
| 1. | "Streaker" (featuring Notrabel) | 2:52 |
| 2. | "Good Complexion" | 2:42 |
| 3. | "Video Warning Attempts" | 2:59 |
| 4. | "Eruption (Gonna Get My Hair Cut at the End of the Summer)" | 3:19 |
| 5. | "Lipstick Destroyer" | 1:48 |
| 6. | "Self Tanner" | 2:57 |
| 7. | "Face Breakout" | 2:39 |
| 8. | "Blow Your Heart" | 3:07 |
| 9. | "Beast Sting" | 2:04 |
| 10. | "Dipsmack" | 2:01 |
| 11. | "Creaming for Beginners" | 2:38 |
| 12. | "Omen Classic" | 2:23 |
| 13. | "Pool City, McKnight Road" | 3:16 |
| 14. | "Spitlord" | 1:09 |
| 15. | "Father Sister Berzerker" | 4:03 |
| 16. | "The Touch from Within" | 4:20 |
| Total length: | | 44:17 |

2020 MiniDisc reissue bonus tracks
| No. | Title | Length |
|---|---|---|
| 17. | "Bronze Hogan" | 2:01 |
| 18. | "Char" | 0:38 |
| Total length: | | 46:56 |

== Charts ==
| Chart | Peak position |
|---|---|
| US Billboard 200 | 157 |
| US Top Dance/Electronic Albums (Billboard) | 6 |
| US Heatseekers Albums (Billboard) | 4 |
| US Independent Albums (Billboard) | 31 |
