= The Loose Salute =

British band

- Origin: United Kingdom
- Genres: Dream pop, surf rock, folk
- Labels: Heavenly Records; Graveface Records
- Members: Ian McCutcheon; Lisa Billson; Charlotte King; Alan Forrester; Alden Evans; Benjamin Wesley Morgan

The Loose Salute are a British band founded by drummer Ian McCutcheon of Slowdive and Mojave 3 who also sings and plays guitar. The band consists Lisa Delatour Billson (vocals, keys, percussion), Charlotte King (vocals, percussion, bells and whistles), Alan Forrester (keys), Alden Evans (guitars) and Benjamin Wesley Morgan (bass).

In a departure from McCutcheon's past projects, The Loose Salute plays a dreamy, surf rock sounding chorus of music helped in live performance by friends and fans. The band tries to encapsulate togetherness and loneliness, as well as surfing, partying, and beaches among other things in their music. The band spend their time in between London and Cornwall and use the Cornwall beaches and life as inspiration for their music. The Loose Salute are signed to Heavenly Records in the UK and Graveface Records in the US.

The name is apparently a reference to the Michael Nesmith album of the same name.

== Discography ==
=== Albums ===
- Tuned to Love (released on 5 June 2007 on Graveface Records in the US)
- Tuned to Love (released on 2 June 2008 on Heavenly Records in the UK)
- Getting Over Being Under (released on 7 June 2011 on Graveface Records)

=== EPs ===
- Suck It Up Buttercup (released in 2004)

=== Singles ===
- "Turn the Radio Up" (released on 19 May 2008)
- "Why'd We Fight?" (released on 13 October 2008)
