= Golden Millennium =

American glam rock group

- Origin: Austin, Texas, USA
- Genre: Glam rock
- Years active: 1999
- Label: Peek-A-Boo Records
- Past members: Dean Hsieh – guitar, vocals Travis Higdon – guitar, vocals Britt Daniel – bass, vocals Tom Hudson – drums
- Website: Official website

Golden Millennium EP

EP by Golden Millennium
- Released: December 31, 1999
- Recorded: 1999 in Austin, Texas
- Genre: Glam rock
- Length: 13:13
- Label: Peek-A-Boo Records
- Producer: Peek-A-Boo Records

Professional ratings
Review scores
Source	Rating
Allmusic	3/5 stars

Golden Millennium was a glam rock revival supergroup formed in 1999 composed of Dean Hsieh, Travis Higdon, Tom Hudson, and Britt Daniel.

== Overview ==
To commemorate the end of the 2nd millennium, Peek-A-Boo Records released the Golden Millennium EP on December 31, 1999. Peek-A-Boo labelmates Dean Hsieh (The 1-4-5s, Teen Titans, The Wontons), Travis Higdon (The 1-4-5s, The Kiss Offs, Black Lipstick), Tom Hudson (Silver Scooter), and Britt Daniel (Spoon, Drake Tungsten, Skellington, The Alien Beats) got together in 1999 and formed the '70s glam-inspired supergroup Golden Millennium. As the label's website reports, Golden Millennium formed as a joke when Hsieh and Higdon bought matching gold-glitter Gibson Les Paul guitars. Coincidentally, Hudson had gold-glitter drums, and the idea of forming a glam band was conceived. The three recruited Daniel on bass, and the group learned a slew of covers and a few originals with the intent of playing only one show. The performance went so well that Golden Millennium recorded the Golden Millennium EP and played one final reprise show at the close of 1999.

== Discography ==
=== Golden Millennium EP ===
1. "Abby Alien" – 3:44
2. "20th Century Boy" – 3:05 (T-Rex cover)
3. "Sci-Fi Suicide" – 3:36
4. "Suffragette City" – 2:48 (David Bowie cover)
