= The Octopus Project =

American experimental band

- Origin: Austin, Texas, United States
- Genres: Experimental, art pop, electronica, psychedelic, post-punk
- Years active: 1999–present
- Labels: Peek-A-Boo Records, Milan Records, Graveface, Too Pure, Robot High School, Earth Libraries
- Members: Josh Lambert; Toto Miranda; Yvonne Lambert
- Website: theoctopusproject.com

The Octopus Project is an American experimental band formed in Austin, TX in 1999 by Toto Miranda, Yvonne Lambert & Josh Lambert. Their first album, Identification Parade, came out in 2002, setting them off on a musical path that veers through blown-out rock’n’roll, vibrant electronics, surreal pop and expansive psych landscapes. Since then, the group of multi-instrumentalists has released six studio albums and scored six feature films. Touring venues and festivals worldwide (Lollapalooza, Coachella, Austin City Limits Festival) both on their own and as handpicked support for artists as diverse as DEVO and Aesop Rock, they have earned a reputation for explosive live shows and immersive audio-visual experiments.

Also active as composers for video games and film, they were awarded the Special Jury Award for Musical Score at the 2014 Sundance Film Festival for their work on the film Kumiko, the Treasure Hunter.

Their recent scoring work includes Damsel (starring Robert Pattinson), The Disappearance of Toby Blackwood (feat. Simon Pegg & Luis Guzman), the Reading Rainbow documentary, Butterfly In the Sky (starring LeVar Burton), & Sasquatch Sunset (starring Jesse Eisenberg & Riley Keough), which premiered at 2024 Sundance Film Festival. The band has also recently scored the Alamo Drafthouse pre-show videos at theaters across the US.

== History ==
The Octopus Project began in 1999 as an experiment between three college friends, Toto Miranda, Yvonne Lambert & Josh Lambert. Having been in guitar-based indie rock bands together for a few years, the trio wanted to branch out and try a new approach at music-making—one that incorporated all of their disparate influences and had no rules.

2002 saw the release of their debut album, Identification Parade, on Peek-A-Boo Records after label head, Travis Higdon, witnessed them at only one show & immediately signed them. The band toured relentlessly for the next few years, releasing their second album, One Ten Hundred Thousand Million to great acclaim in 2005. The band continued touring throughout 2005, headlining venues all across the US and landing opening gigs for folks like ...And You Will Know Us by the Trail of Dead.

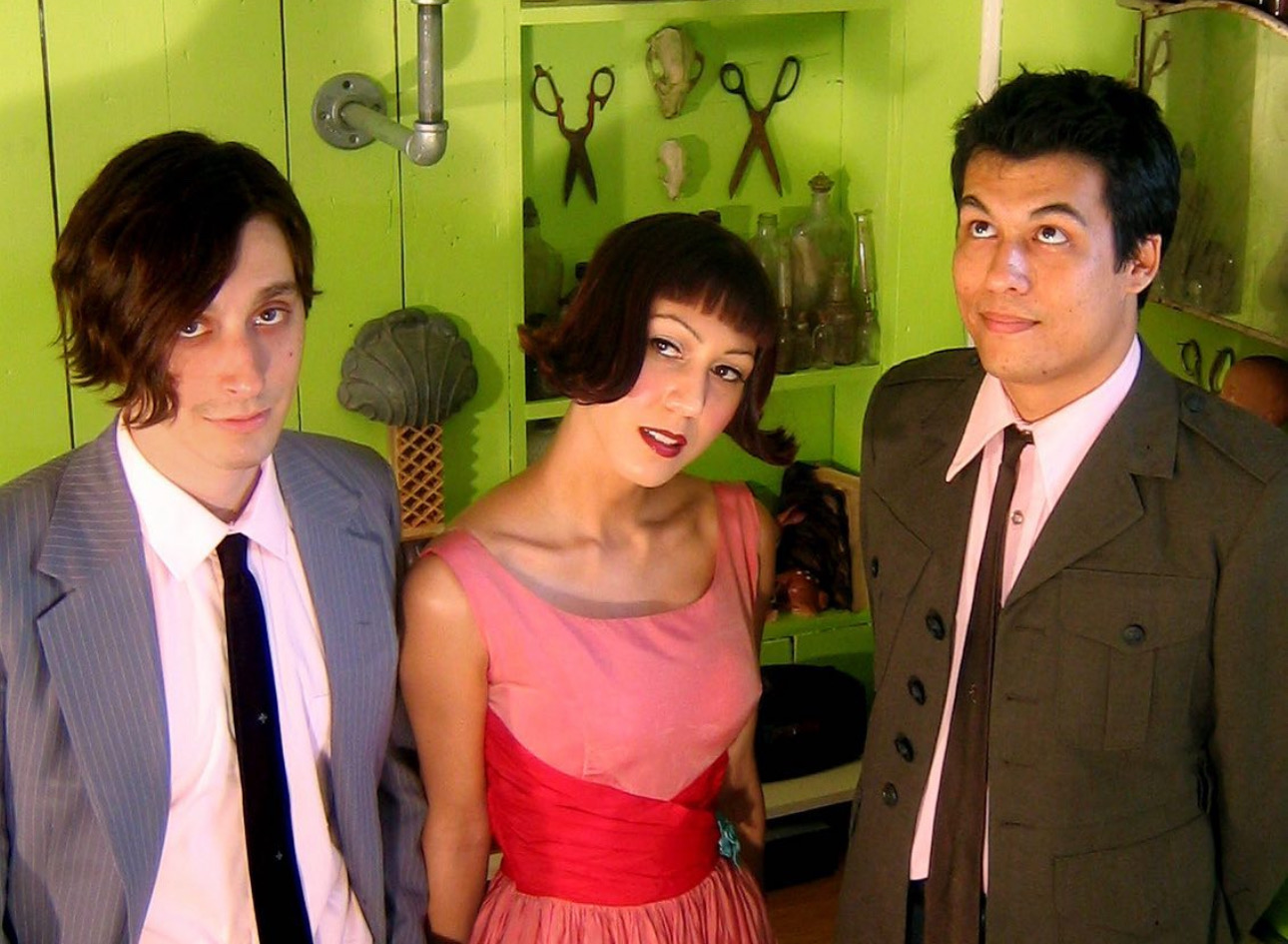
The Octopus Project in 2005 (Josh Lambert, Yvonne Lambert & Toto Miranda)

On April 30, 2006, The Octopus Project performed at Coachella. They were offered the opportunity after a fan, unbeknownst to the band, entered them in a contest held by the festival on MySpace in which voters were to "nominate their favorite band for an open slot at the festival". On October 31, 2006, Graveface Records released The House of Apples and Eyeballs -- a collaborative album between the band & Black Moth Super Rainbow.

In January 2007, they holed up in Bear Creek Studio outside of Seattle to record their third album, Hello, Avalanche. The album was released to great fanfare on October 9, 2007—garnering praise from music gatekeepers from Pitchfork to Rolling Stone. David Fricke described the band as, "smart pop scientists and total party animals, like Stereolab with happy feet," and proclaimed them as one of his top SXSW picks that year. The band went on to support underground hip hop star Aesop Rock and indie electronic icons Stereo Total on their national tours that fall. In 2008, the group performed at notable festivals such as Lollapalooza, All Tomorrow's Parties, and the Austin City Limits Festival. Also in 2008, the band released a 7" single on Too Pure as a part of the famed label's music club series.

In February 2009, The Octopus Project composed and performed a series of unique, individual scores for short films played at Alamo Drafthouse in Austin, Texas. For their performance at the SXSW festival in March 2010, the band put together a multi-media show which involved them performing material from what was to be their upcoming release, Hexadecagon. The band performed surrounded by eight loudspeakers, while eight projectors projected videos corresponding to the music on tent ceilings above the stage and the audience. Later that same year, the Octopus Project played at Moogfest in Asheville, North Carolina. They were scheduled to play just prior to Devo's headlining set. Three days prior to the concert, Devo's guitarist, Bob Mothersbaugh, severely injured his hand and was unable to play. Since the band was receiving a Moog Innovation Award at the festival, and because they didn't want to disappoint their fans, the remaining two members of Devo enlisted the help of The Octopus Project, and together the two bands performed the Devo songs "Girl U Want" and "Beautiful World."

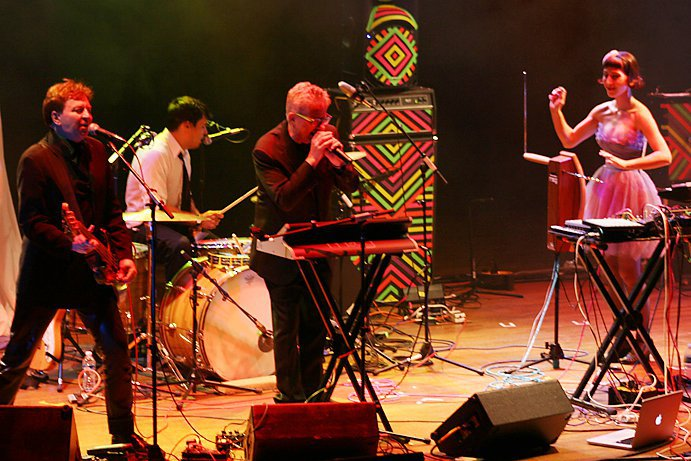
The Octopus Project and Devo performing together at Moogfest 2010

In 2011, the band snagged the opening spot on tours with Devo, Man or Astroman, and Explosions in the Sky. The band spent the rest of that year working on soundtracks for the feature film Kid-Thing, and the video game Thunderbeam. In 2012, The Octopus Project began work on what would be their fifth studio album, Fever Forms. The first single from the album, "Whitby", was released as an EP in November—complete with b-sides, a karaoke version, and a video directed by the band.

In 2014, the band was awarded The Special Jury Award for Musical Score at the Sundance Film Festival for their work on the soundtrack to the film, Kumiko, the Treasure Hunter. In 2015, the band released two EPs of new music paired with handmade art objects—the first, Mister, a stuffed animal & the second, Nelda, a resin sculpture. Excited about the new tunes, the band dove into writing what would become their next record, 2017's Memory Mirror. The album was mixed and recorded by Dave Fridmann and Danny Reisch.

On June 22, 2018, the band released the soundtrack for the film Damsel (a western directed by the Zellner Bros., starring Robert Pattinson & Mia Wasikowska) on Milan Records. Produced on period specific instruments—banjo, musical saw, acoustic guitar, flute, wine glasses—the score finds the band in unknown territory sounding at once both haunting and majestic. The New York Times called the score "marvelously weird," while Consequence of Sound dubbed it "brilliant," and Entertainment Weekly said, "The real heart of the movie is the unearthly score from The Octopus Project."

2019 saw the band expanding further into art installation territory, with LOOM II—an immersive, ambient surround sound & surround light performance, which premiered at the Fusebox Festival in Austin, TX.

2020 & 2021 was spent working on the scores for the dark comedy film The Disappearance of Toby Blackwood and a documentary about Reading Rainbow entitled Butterfly In the Sky, which was released physically by Earth Libraries and reached #15 on the Billboard Children's chart. While The Disappearance of Toby Blackwood was a percussion-forward outing & the latter, the latter was a deep-dive into the universe of 70's PBS synth sounds. In December 2021, the band was invited to perform their song, "I Saw the Bright Shinies," at the Moog Sound Lab to unveil their newest Etherwave Theremin.

In 2022, the band began working on the music that would become the score for Sasquatch Sunset, which premiered at the 2024 Sundance Film Festival. The film's closing credits song, "The Creatures of Nature," is sung by Riley Keough and written by The Octopus Project & director, David Zellner. On December 2, 2022, the band released an EP of covers entitled "I Want Vikram."

== Members ==
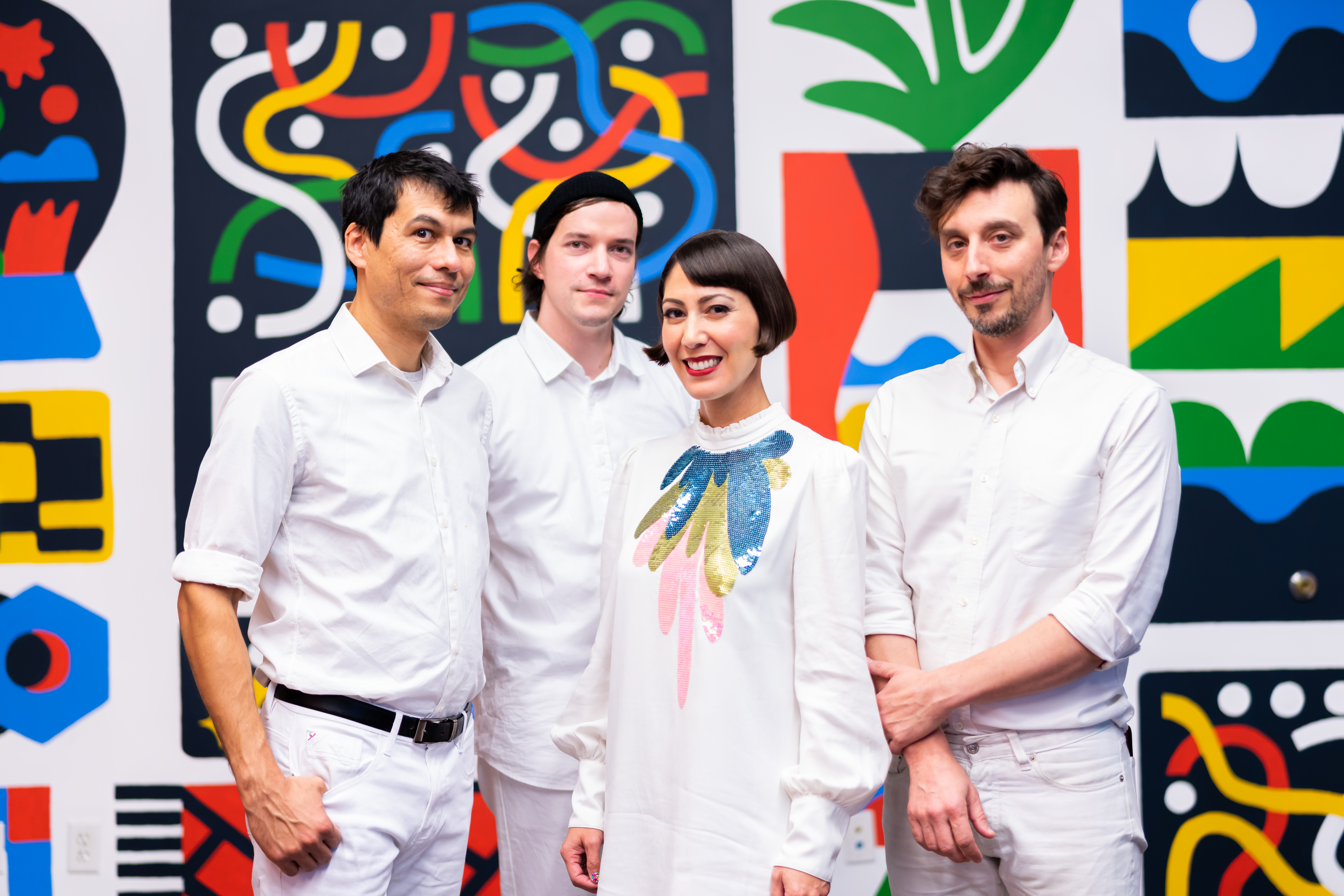
The Octopus Project in 2021

- Josh Lambert: guitar, bass, keyboards, drums, vocals
- Toto Miranda: guitar, bass, keyboards, drums, vocals
- Yvonne Lambert: theremin, guitar, bass, keyboards, drums, vocals
- Spencer Stephenson (live): guitar, keyboards, drums

== Discography ==
=== Studio albums ===
- Identification Parade (2002)
- One Ten Hundred Thousand Million (2005)
- Hello, Avalanche (2007)
- Hexadecagon (2010)
- Fever Forms (2013)
- Memory Mirror (2017)

=== Film soundtracks ===
- Kid-Thing (2012)
- Kumiko, the Treasure Hunter (2014)
- Damsel (2018)
- The Disappearance of Toby Blackwood (2022)
- Butterfly In the Sky (2024)
- Sasquatch Sunset (2024)
- Alpha Gang (2026)

=== Video game soundtracks ===
- Frankenfoods (2012)
- Thunderbeam (2012)

=== In popular culture ===
- The song "Music Is Happiness" is featured in the video game Tony Hawk's Proving Ground (2007)
- The song "Music Is Happiness" is featured in the film 21 (2008)
- The song "Truck" is featured in the film Medicine for Melancholy (2008)
- The song "I Saw the Bright Shinies" is featured in the short film, Pashmy Dream, directed by Dennis Hopper (2008)
- The song "Music Is Happiness" is featured in the show CSI:NY (2008)
- The song "Fuguefat" is featured in the show Jeopardy (2011)
- The song "Fuguefat" is featured in a series of Absolut commercials (2012)
- The song "Fuguefat" is featured in the documentary series The Smash Brothers (2013)
- The song "Korakrit" is featured in a Netflix commercial (2015)
- The song "I Saw the Bright Shinies" is featured in a series of The Sims commercials (2015)
- The song "Whitby" is the theme song for the show Screenland (2016)
- The song "Small Hundred" is featured in a Samsung commercial (2018)
- The song "What They Found" is featured in a Stüssy commercial (2021)
- The song "Small Hundred" is featured in the show How To Get Away with Murder (2021)
- The song "Porno Disaster" is featured in the show Walker (TV series) (2021)
- The song "Fuguefat" is featured in the show Republic of Sarah (2021)
- The song "Wrong Gong" is featured in an ESPN commercial (2021)

=== Splits, remixes, singles and EPs ===
- Christmas on Mars (Soda Pop Productions, 1999)
- Black Octopus Lipstick Project Foam Party (Peek-A-Boo Records, 2004)
- The House of Apples and Eyeballs (Collaboration with Black Moth Super Rainbow, Graveface Records, 2006)
- Wet Gold/Moon Boil (7", Too Pure Records, 2007)
- Golden Beds (Peek-A-Boo Records, 2009)
- Whitby EP (Peek-A-Boo Records, 2012)
- I Want Vikram (Robot High School, 2022)

== See also ==
- Music of Austin

== Other sources ==
- Hart, Jeremy (2003). "The Eight Creeping Tentacles of Death of...The Octopus Project!". Issue 6. Space City Rock.
