= Plastic Utopia =

1997 film by David Zellner

- Directed by: David Zellner
- Written by: David Zellner; Nathan Zellner
- Produced by: David Zellner; Nathan Zellner
- Release date: October 4, 1997 (Austin)
- Running time: 98 minutes
- Country: United States
- Language: English

Plastic Utopia is a 1997 independent comedy written by David Zellner and Nathan Zellner. It was directed by David Zellner. It was the first feature film made by the Zellner Brothers.

The film tells the story of an embittered mime, James (David Zellner), who decides to turn to crime along with his roommate, Frank (Nathan Zellner).

== Cast ==
Actor/Actress	Role
David Zellner	James
Nathan Zellner	Frank
Lana Dieterich	Elise
Rebecca Brogden	Sofia
Buddy Bruce Boyles	Golden White Boy
Bryan Christner	Nick
James Cochran	Old Man Calahan
Rob Faubion	Russell
Pat Garvey	Horseshoe Emcee
John Lennon Harrison	Grand Master Ted
Don House	Mime Enthusiast
Justin Lincoln	Corduroy Boy
Wiley Wiggins	Jogger Joe
Kerri Lause	Ruth
Alan Hines	Buster Tuffstuff
Tracy Simpson	Betsy
Stephanie Wilson	The Beast

== Production ==
After David Zellner graduated from the University of Texas film program, he and his brother Nathan began making shorts in their hometown of Austin, Texas. They shot Plastic Utopia, their first feature, in about 25 days.

== Reception ==
Merle Bertrand of Film Threat wrote of the film: "Loaded with brilliant art design, hysterically demented sight gags, and 'Ick! Why did I laugh at that?' dialogue, 'Plastic Utopia' is an evil gem waiting to be discovered."

At the 1997 Austin Film Festival, it was a nominee for Best Feature Film, losing to Robert Bella's Colin Fitz Lives!.
