= LA UTI =

EP by Tobacco
- Released: November 9, 2010
- Genre: Electronic
- Length: 18:11
- Label: Anticon
- Producer: Tobacco

Tobacco chronology
Maniac Meat (2010)	LA UTI (2010)	Exorcise Tape (2013)

Professional ratings
Review scores
Source	Rating
The A.V. Club	A−
Consequence of Sound	D
Pitchfork	6.5/10
Spectrum Culture	2.0/5

LA UTI is an EP by Tobacco. It was released through Anticon on November 9, 2010. It includes guest appearances from Antipop Consortium, Doseone, Rob Sonic, Serengeti, Height, Icicle Frog, and Zackey Force Funk.

== Critical reception ==
Chris Martins of The A.V. Club gave the EP a grade of A−, saying: "The only bummer comes with the realization that more than half the backing tracks are reduxed from Maniac Meat, but perhaps LA UTI is a bridge to something bigger." Larry Fitzmaurice of Pitchfork gave the EP a 6.5 out of 10, saying: "It seems like a lot of the guests here are trying to out-weird the material they're delivering over, which is precisely why Rob Sonic's appearance on 'Lick the Witch' works so well."

== Track listing ==
No.	Title	Length
1.	"TV All Greasy" (featuring Antipop Consortium)	2:33
2.	"The Injury" (featuring Doseone)	1:35
3.	"Lick the Witch" (featuring Rob Sonic)	2:21
4.	"2 Thick Scoops" (featuring Serengeti)	2:45
5.	"Sweatmother" (featuring Height with Friends)	2:12
6.	"Unholy Demon Rhythms" (featuring Icicle Frog)	2:01
7.	"Lamborghini Meltdown" (featuring Zackey Force Funk)	2:29

== Personnel ==
Credits adapted from liner notes.

- Tobacco – music, artwork
- Beans – vocals (1), lyrics (1)
- Earl Blaize – vocals (1), lyrics (1)
- Adam Drucker – vocals (2), lyrics (2)
- Rob Smith – vocals (3), lyrics (3)
- David Cohn – vocals (3), lyrics (4)
- Height – vocals (5), lyrics (5)
- Franklin Yaker – vocals (5)
- Icicle Frog – vocals (6), lyrics (6)
- Zackey Force Funk – vocals (7), lyrics (7)
