= The Seven Fields of Aphelion =

American electronic musician

- Birth name: Maureen Elizabeth Boyle
- Origin: Pittsburgh, Pennsylvania, U.S.
- Genres: Ambient
- Occupation: Musician
- Instrument: Synthesizer
- Labels: Graveface
- Member of: Black Moth Super Rainbow

Maureen Elizabeth Boyle, known professionally as The Seven Fields of Aphelion, is an American ambient electronic musician and member of the band Black Moth Super Rainbow.

== Biography ==
Boyle grew up in Pittsburgh and took piano lessons from an early age, but did not begin writing her own songs until college. She joined the group Black Moth Super Rainbow as a synthesizer player in the early 2000s, but in contrast to that group's experimental psychedelic electronica, Boyle's solo music tends more toward what one reviewer called "a patchwork quilt of ambient soundscapes." She had been working on solo material for five years prior to the release of her first album. Graveface Records released Boyle's solo release under the name Seven Fields of Aphelion, entitled Periphery, in 2010. The album's booklet includes photographs of natural and industrial scenes taken by Boyle herself.

== Discography ==
- Periphery (Graveface Records, 2010)
- Keep the Ocean Inside (Rad Cult Records, 2017)
