= One Ten Hundred Thousand Million =

Studio album by The Octopus Project
- Released: January 25, 2005
- Genres: Indie rock, electronica
- Length: 38:26
- Label: Peek-A-Boo Records

The Octopus Project chronology
| Identification Parade (2002) | One Ten Hundred Thousand Million (2005) | The House of Apples and Eyeballs (2006) |

Professional ratings
Review scores
| Source | Rating |
|---|---|
| AllMusic | 4/5 stars |
| Pitchfork | 7.3/10 |
| PopMatters | 7/10 stars |

One Ten Hundred Thousand Million is the second studio album by electronic band The Octopus Project. It was released January 25, 2005 on Peek-A-Boo Records.

== Track listing ==
1. "Exit Counselor" – 1:32
2. "The Adjustor" – 2:53
3. "All of the Champs That Ever Lived" – 4:11
4. "Bruise" – 3:10
5. "Responsible Stu" – 3:40
6. "Music Is Happiness" – 3:39
7. "Tuxedo Hat" – 5:13
8. "Malaria Codes" – 3:44
9. "Hold the Ladder" – 3:36
10. "Six Feet Up" – 3:53
11. "Lots More Stairs" – 2:55

Notes

- "Music is Happiness" has featured in Tony Hawk's Proving Ground and has a music video. It also appears on the soundtrack for the movie 21.
