= Panic Blooms =

Studio album by Black Moth Super Rainbow
- Released: May 4, 2018
- Genre: Electronic
- Length: 42:24
- Label: Rad Cult

Black Moth Super Rainbow chronology
Cobra Juicy (2012)	Panic Blooms (2018)	Soft New Magic Dream (2025)

Professional ratings
Aggregate scores
Source	Rating
Metacritic	72/100
Review scores
Source	Rating
AllMusic	4/5 stars
Exclaim!	(7/10)

Panic Blooms is the sixth studio album by American electronic band Black Moth Super Rainbow. It was released on May 4, 2018, under Rad Cult Records.

== Critical reception ==
Panic Blooms was met with "generally favorable" reviews from critics. At Metacritic, which assigns a weighted average rating out of 100 to reviews from mainstream publications, this release received an average score of 72, based on 7 reviews. Aggregator Album of the Year gave the release a 73 out of 100 based on a critical consensus of 5 reviews.

== Track listing ==
No.	Title	Length
1.	"Panic Blooms"	4:03
2.	"Baby's in the Void"	3:38
3.	"Rip On Through"	1:55
4.	"One More Ear"	0:51
5.	"Bad Fuckin Times"	2:42
6.	"New Breeze"	4:09
7.	"Aerosol Weather"	1:44
8.	"June July 28"	1:05
9.	"Bottomless Face"	2:35
10.	"Permanent Hole"	3:19
11.	"To the Beat of a Creeper"	1:30
12.	"We Might Come Back"	2:26
13.	"Harmlessly"	2:25
14.	"Backwash"	4:04
15.	"Sunset Curses"	2:21
16.	"Mr No One"	3:37

Bonus cassette
No.	Title	Length
1.	"Smoky Mountain Neverthing"	9:11

On October 18, 2019, Rad Cult released an alternate version of the album titled Panic Fades. In addition to two exclusive bonus tracks, the Panic Blooms tracks are slowed down to 75% the original speed to simulate a vinyl listening experience.

Panic Fades CD track listing
No.	Title	Length
1.	"The Neither"	2:19
2.	"Bad Fuckin Times (Slow)"	3:33
3.	"June July 28 (Slow)"	1:23
4.	"Harmlessly (Slow)"	3:09
5.	"Mr No One (Slow)"	4:44
6.	"We Might Come Back (Slow)"	3:11
7.	"Aerosol Weather (Slow)"	2:16
8.	"Rip On Through (Slow)"	2:32
9.	"Bottomless Face (Slow)"	3:23
10.	"One More Ear (Slow)"	1:07
11.	"Panic Blooms (Slow)"	5:21
12.	"New Breeze (Slow)"	5:28
13.	"Backwash (Slow)"	5:20
14.	"Permanent Hole (Slow)"	4:21
15.	"Baby's in the Void (Slow)"	4:47
16.	"Sunset Curses (Slow)"	3:05
17.	"To the Beat of a Creeper (Slow)"	1:57
18.	"Good When It Fades"	2:21

== Charts ==
Chart (2018)	Peak position
US Top Album Sales (Billboard)	54
US Independent Albums (Billboard)	15
US Heatseekers Albums (Billboard)	1
US Indie Store Album Sales (Billboard)	17
