= The Allegheny White Fish Tapes =

Compilation album by Tobacco
- Released: July 7, 2009
- Genres: Psychedelic rock, lo-fi, noise rock, experimental
- Label: Rad Cult

Tobacco chronology
Fucked Up Friends (2008)	The Allegheny White Fish Tapes (2009)	Maniac Meat (2010)

The Allegheny White Fish Tapes is a compilation album of Tobacco's early tapes from 1996-1999 released on July 7, 2009, described as "over 70 minutes of mostly unreleased/unheard songs. warped drum machines, purple noise, Black Flag-esque tracks, ripped cassettes, and rhythmic melodies to calm you down. Pre-vocoder & ambient and mystical synths, post-apocalyptic surrealism."

== Track listing ==
No.	Title	Length
1.	"Braided Cellophane"	2:19
2.	"What You Gonna Say to Me?"	1:45
3.	"Sunburned Face"	2:38
4.	"The Bees Love Me"	3:53
5.	"Left Out (The Freaky Pieces)"	3:36
6.	"Enough to Calm You Down"	4:29
7.	"Metal Ball Moon"	1:36
8.	"Backwards Song #2"	0:40
9.	"Dead Cowboy Dance (Live to Ghettoblaster)"	4:01
10.	"The Blue Seahorse"	2:46
11.	"4-Track Phone Mistake"	1:28
12.	"The Love Song"	2:41
13.	"Gonna Git You Brainwashed (Long Version)"	3:49
14.	"Oh Shit Doug"	2:47
15.	"I Am 6 Years Old"	5:20
16.	"Eating Butterflies"	2:46
17.	"I Saw Brown"	4:39
18.	"All Songs Have an Ending"	5:28
19.	"Too Weird to Be a Tree"	3:30
20.	"Violet Induced Armpit"	3:09
21.	"Friendly and Unfriendly Spiders"	4:21
22.	"Hidden Track 1" (unlisted)	0:11
23.	"Hidden Track 2" (unlisted, originally titled "The Goodbye Method")	4:48
Total length:		1:10:29

- 1–6, 17, 18 & 23 from the album The Anti Freakout Method, released on CDR in 1999, less than 40 copies made
- 7 & 8 from EP 1996, released on cassette in 1996, less than 20 copies made
- 9 recorded live to ghetto blaster in 1996 with Doug and the mysterious Justin, previously unreleased
- 10 from EP 97, released on cassette in 1997, less than 10 copies made
- 11 recorded in 1997, previously unreleased
- 12 from the mini album The Fucked Sound, released on cassette in 1998, less than 15 copies made
- 13 & 14 from the album Bad Vibrations, released on cassette in 1999, less than 15 copies made
- 15 from the Bad Vibrations sessions, previously unreleased
- 16 released as an mp3 single in 1999
- 17–20 from the Violet Induced Armpit: Good Songs Infinity EP, released on cassette in 1999, but never given out (track 17 was previously released on Black Moth Super Rainbow's Drippers EP)
- 21 recorded live with drums in 1999, previously unreleased, the last recorded AWF song

== See also ==
- Black Moth Super Rainbow
- Fucked Up Friends
