= Memory Mirror =

2017 album by The Octopus Project

Studio album by The Octopus Project
- Released: April 7, 2017
- Genres: Indie rock, electronica
- Length: 40:13
- Label: Robot High School
- Producer: The Octopus Project

The Octopus Project chronology
Memory Mirror (2017)	Damsel (2018)

Professional ratings
Review scores
Source	Rating
AllMusic	4/5 stars
Austin Chronicle	3/5 stars
ACRN	9/10 stars

Memory Mirror is the sixth studio album by experimental pop band The Octopus Project. It was released April 7, 2017, on Robot High School Records.

== Reception ==
Memory Mirror was generally well received by critics, receiving 4/5 stars from AllMusic, 3/5 stars from The Austin Chronicle, and 9/10 stars from ACRN.

Lauren Doyle, writing for Mxdwn, described Memory Mirror as "an electronica exploration doused in pop harmonies and trippy instrumentals" and noted that "the first three tracks captivate, catapulting listeners into the unimaginable world of The Octopus Project". Doyle concluded, "With all of its clever song titles and extraterrestrial sound, Memory Mirror is a worthy listen and just as quickly as it energizes its listeners it lulls them into a trance, only to have them go back and play the album through again".

Relix's J. Poet discussed how "Octopus Project continues to demolish our expectations of what a rock band can be" and highlighted the way the band utilizes "fractured dance rhythms, post-rock clatter, mysterious theremin stabs, jazzy cocktail-lounge ambience and experimental electro textures", which "swirl through the mix in unexpected combinations and permutations". They pointed out the songs "Small Hundred", "Remember Remembering", "Understanding Fruit", "Ledgeridge", and "Brounce".

== Track listing ==
1. "Prism Riot" – 1:10
2. "Brounce" – 2:14
3. "Wrong Gong" – 3:10
4. "Mendoza" – 3:21
5. "Remember Remembering" – 3:32
6. "Understanding Fruit" – 4:32
7. "Small Hundred" – 2:49
8. "Pedro Yang" – 4:23
9. "Woah, Mossman!!" – 2:54
10. "Beta Wand" – 2:34
11. "Cuidate" – 1:38
12. "Ledgeridge" – 5:02
13. "Leven" – 2:54

=== Notes ===
- Mixed by Dave Fridmann and Danny Reisch
- Mastered by Max Lorenzen
- Artwork by Jaime Zuverza
