= Maniac Meat =

Studio album by Tobacco
- Released: May 25, 2010
- Genre: Electronic
- Length: 42:18
- Label: Anticon
- Producer: Tobacco

Tobacco chronology
| The Allegheny White Fish Tapes (2009) | Maniac Meat (2010) | LA UTI (2010) |

Professional ratings
Aggregate scores
| Source | Rating |
|---|---|
| Metacritic | 69/100 |
Review scores
| Source | Rating |
| AllMusic | 3.5/5 stars |
| The A.V. Club | C |
| Beats Per Minute | 75/100 |
| Consequence of Sound | C |
| Now | NNN |
| Pitchfork | 7.6/10 |
| PopMatters | 8/10 stars |
| The Skinny | 2/5 stars |

Maniac Meat is the second studio album by Tobacco. It was released through Anticon on May 25, 2010. Beck provided vocals on "Fresh Hex" and "Grape Aerosmith". The album peaked at number 16 on the Billboard Top Dance/Electronic Albums chart, as well as number 44 on the Heatseekers Albums chart.

== Critical reception ==
At Metacritic, which assigns a weighted average score out of 100 to reviews from mainstream critics, the album received an average score of 69% based on 11 reviews, indicating "generally favorable reviews".

== Track listing ==
| No. | Title | Length |
|---|---|---|
| 1. | "Constellation Dirtbike Head" | 2:55 |
| 2. | "Fresh Hex" (featuring Beck) | 1:35 |
| 3. | "Mexican Icecream" | 2:21 |
| 4. | "Lick the Witch" | 2:45 |
| 5. | "Sweatmother" | 2:12 |
| 6. | "Motorlicker" | 2:01 |
| 7. | "Unholy Demon Rhythms" | 2:29 |
| 8. | "Heavy Makeup" | 4:45 |
| 9. | "Grape Aerosmith" (featuring Beck) | 1:51 |
| 10. | "New Juices from the Hot Tub Freaks" | 2:06 |
| 11. | "Six Royal Vipers" | 2:26 |
| 12. | "Overheater" | 1:43 |
| 13. | "Creepy Phone Calls" | 4:08 |
| 14. | "TV All Greasy" | 3:21 |
| 15. | "Stretch Your Face" | 2:45 |
| 16. | "Nuclear Waste Aerobics" | 2:56 |
| Total length: | | 39:40 |

== Charts ==
| Chart | Peak position |
|---|---|
| US Top Dance/Electronic Albums (Billboard) | 16 |
| US Heatseekers Albums (Billboard) | 44 |
