= Sweatbox Dynasty =

Studio album by Tobacco
- Released: August 19, 2016
- Length: 30:08
- Label: Ghostly International
- Producer: Tobacco

Tobacco chronology
Ultima II Massage (2014)	Sweatbox Dynasty (2016)	Ripe & Majestic (Instrumental Rarities & Unreleased Beats) (2017)

Sweatbox Dynasty is the fourth studio album by American electronic musician Tobacco, released August 19, 2016, by Ghostly International.

== Reception ==
Sweatbox Dynasty ratings
Aggregate scores
Source	Rating
AnyDecentMusic?	6.1/10
Metacritic	67/100
Review scores
Source	Rating
AllMusic	7/10
Consequence of Sound	C+
Drowned in Sound	7/10
Exclaim!	7/10
The Guardian	2/5 stars
The Line of Best Fit	7.5/10
Pitchfork	6.7/10
Record Collector	3/5 stars
The Skinny	4/5 stars
Under the Radar	6/10 stars

According to the review aggregator Metacritic, Sweatbox Dynasty received "generally favorable reviews" based on a weighted average score of 67 out of 100 from 11 critic scores.

=== Year-end lists ===
Sweatbox Dynasty year-end lists
Publication	#	Ref.
PopMatters	18	

== Track listing ==
All tracks are written by Tobacco. All tracks are produced by Tobacco.

Sweatbox Dynasty track listing
No.	Title	Length
1.	"Human Om"	3:05
2.	"Hong"	1:09
3.	"Wipeth Out"	1:32
4.	"Gods in Heat"	3:21
5.	"Home Invasionaries"	2:22
6.	"Dimensional Hum"	2:14
7.	"Warlock Mary"	2:33
8.	"Suck Viper"	1:56
9.	"The Madonna"	1:10
10.	"Fantasy Trash Wave"	2:47
11.	"Memory Girl"	1:50
12.	"Let's Get Worn Away"	6:09
Total length:		30:08
