= Kid-Thing =

- Film poster
- Directed by: David Zellner
- Written by: David Zellner
- Produced by: Nathan Zellner
- Starring: Sydney Aguirre; Susan Tyrrell; David Zellner; Nathan Zellner
- Cinematography: Nathan Zellner
- Edited by: Melba Jodorowsky
- Music by: The Octopus Project
- Production company: Zellner Bros.
- Release dates: January 23, 2012 (Sundance Film Festival); May 25, 2013
- Running time: 83 minutes
- Country: United States
- Language: English

Kid-Thing is a 2012 American drama film written and directed by David Zellner. The film was shown in 2012 at various festivals, including the Sundance Film Festival and Berlin International Film Festival. In the USA, the film was released on May 22, 2013 for cinemas.

== Plot ==
Ten-year-old Annie lives with her father Marvin on a goat farm somewhere in Texas. Annie is often bored, having no pleasure for school, and her alcoholic father does not care about her. Since Marvin spends time with Demolition Derby and his goats, Annie is often alone. Out of sheer boredom, she makes forays into the countryside, where Annie lives out her lust for destruction.

When Annie is traveling in the nearby forest she hears a woman's voice calling for help. She follows the voice and finds a dry well in the ground. The woman (calling herself Esther) is in the well, and she asks Annie to save her. Annie reacts skeptical and believes it is the devil who wants to outsmart her. Frightened, she runs away and goes home. Arriving home, Marvin shows her how to hypnotize a chicken, wanting to show her an example of unconditional love. But Annie replies that the animals just love him because he gives them food.

The next day Annie returns to the well, bringing Esther sandwiches, Capri Sun, toilet paper and a walkie-talkie. Esther thanks Annie, but begs her to get adult help. Still, Annie remains skeptical and cannot be persuaded. One evening she radios Esther with the walkie-talkie and asks how she's doing. Esther is angry because she could not reach Annie and calls Annie a bad person. Annie is insulted and calls Esther a wicked witch.

The next morning Annie tries to talk to Esther, but the walkie-talkie issues only a faint hiss. She wanders the countryside, checking the walkie-talkie, but no matter where she goes the walkie-talkie is silent. Annie brings drinks and bananas for Esther, tossing the food into the well. She then lights and drops a fire cracker into the well, but there's still no response from Esther.

Annie goes home and watches as Marvin has a heart attack while feeding the goats, but she doesn't go for help. She goes back to the well and sits down on the edge, her legs dangling into the abyss. Then she jumps down into the dark unknown.

== Production ==
The shooting of the film took place in a suburb of Austin, Texas. It was produced and directed by the Zellner Bros. Part of the costs were from a Kickstarter funding. This lavish sound design is by Nathan Zellner. For the role of Annie, the Zellner brothers cast the daughter of acquaintances.

== Reception ==
Critics received the film favorably. On review aggregator Rotten Tomatoes, the film holds an approval rating of 71% based on 14 reviews, with an average rating of 6.08/10. On Metacritic, the film has a weighted average score of 58 out of 100, based on seven critics, indicating "mixed or average" reviews.

The New York Times's Neil Genzlinger reviewed Kid-Thing favorably with "Ms. Aguirre captures Annie’s bottled-up anger nicely, though the role asks a limited amount of her, since it has little dialogue. The film is, if nothing else, an interesting meditation on how a child who grows up without guidance might react to a situation that requires judgment. You can even take a sliver of hope from it. This girl raised by wolves, as it were, may not make the best decisions, but she at least knows instinctively that she should be doing something." The Hollywood Reporter's Todd McCarthy critiqued the film with "The Zellners' frequent fixed-frame compositions, oddball ideas for scenes, slow-burn sense of humor, unusually dense sound design and ongoing collaboration with The Octopus Project for the score create some engaging aesthetic effects. But, with the possible exception of Aguirre's performance, there's little here to stick to the ribs and the film's ultimate impact is slight." Variety's Ronnie Scheib opined that "Spearheaded by phenomenal pint-sized lead Sydney Aguirre, this challenging third feature from the Zellner Brothers retains much of their provocative trademark idiocy but navigates darker waters."
