= Damsel (2018 film) =

American Western comedy film

- Theatrical release poster
- Directed by: David Zellner; Nathan Zellner
- Written by: David Zellner; Nathan Zellner
- Produced by: Nathan Zellner; Chris Ohlson; David Zellner
- Starring: Robert Pattinson; Mia Wasikowska
- Cinematography: Adam Stone
- Edited by: Melba Robichaux
- Music by: The Octopus Project
- Production company: Great Point Media
- Distributed by: Magnolia Pictures
- Release dates: January 23, 2018 (Sundance); June 22, 2018 (United States)
- Running time: 113 minutes
- Country: United States
- Language: English
- Box office: $323,235

Damsel is a 2018 American Western black comedy film written and directed by David Zellner and Nathan Zellner. It stars Robert Pattinson and Mia Wasikowska.

The film premiered at the 2018 Sundance Film Festival on January 23, 2018 and was released on June 22, 2018, by Magnolia Pictures and Great Point Media.

== Plot ==
Samuel Alabaster, an affluent pioneer, intends to propose to and marry the love of his life, Penelope. In town he hires Parson Henry, a drunkard, to officiate it. Together, the two venture across the American frontier with a mini horse named Butterscotch, a wedding present for Penelope.

During the journey, Samuel and Henry run into Rufus Cornell, who attempts to shoot and kill Samuel before running off. Samuel chases after Rufus, only for the latter to fall off a cliff to his apparent death. Samuel confesses to Henry that Penelope had been kidnapped by Rufus and Rufus' brother Anton, and that he seeks to rescue her. Henry agrees to help him for more money.

Reaching the Cornell home, Samuel attempts to sneak around the property as Henry watches from afar. Anton exits the house, and Henry panics. He fatally shoots Anton in the head. Samuel rushes up to the corpse and shoots it some more.

Penelope exits the house and holds Samuel at gunpoint. Samuel attempts to propose to her but she rejects him and declares that she hates him and loved Anton. In grief, Samuel commits suicide. Penelope takes Henry as her prisoner before blowing up the house.

Venturing back toward the town, Penelope and Henry run into Rufus, who survived his fall and was able to track Henry and Penelope. Rufus attempts to take Penelope as his wife, but she rejects him. He then decides to murder her and Henry but is shot and killed with an arrow by Zachariah Running Bear. That night, Henry discusses his desire to learn of the Native culture and asks to join Zachariah on his journey. The next day, Henry and Penelope awaken to discover that Zachariah has left.

Penelope frees Henry, who hugs her and apologizes for what has happened. However, before Penelope leaves with Butterscotch, Henry spontaneously proposes to her. She throws a large stone in his face and rides off.

== Cast ==
- Robert Pattinson as Samuel Alabaster
- Mia Wasikowska as Penelope
- David Zellner as Parson Henry
- Robert Forster as Old Preacher
- Gabe Casdorph as Anton Cornell
- Nathan Zellner as Rufus Cornell
- Joseph Billingiere as Zacharia Running Bear
- Russell Mael as Prairie Crooner

== Production ==
David and Nathan Zellner assembled the three principal cast members along with 27 crewmembers and 70 extras. Filming was set to last 32 days. Most of the film was shot in Utah, which provided tax incentives for the production. Its budget was less than $5 million USD.

In an interview, Pattinson described the film as, "a kind of slapstick comedy."

=== Filming ===
Principal photography began on July 11, 2016 at Wasatch Range in Summit County, Utah. Filming moved to Oregon in late August 2016. Scenes were filmed with Pattinson and Wasikowska on the Oregon Coast on August 25, 2016, after which filming was wrapped.

=== Music ===
In February 2017, David Zellner confirmed via an Instagram post that The Octopus Project would compose the score for the film. In March 2017, Pattinson himself confirmed that he is also contributing to the music of the film.

In February 2018, it was announced that Russell Mael of the band Sparks was cast in a singing role.

== Reception ==
On review aggregator website Rotten Tomatoes, the film holds an approval rating of 67% based on 118 reviews, and an average rating of 6.4/10. The website's critical consensus reads, "The beautifully filmed Damsel injects the western genre with a welcome dose of humor and some unexpected twists, although its stately pace may frustrate impatient viewers." On Metacritic, the film has a weighted average score of 63 out of 100, based on 33 critics, indicating "generally favorable" reviews.

Christy Lemire of RogerEbert.com wrote "On screen, David Zellner also contributes to that sensation in his ever-evolving portrayal of Parson Henry. His entire presence is a ruse, but like Samuel and Penelope, he's also searching for some sort of happiness and comfort within this vast, harsh landscape. They're elusive, but they might be waiting out there, just beyond the horizon." Jonathan Romney of The Guardian wrote "when it comes to Damsel capturing the look of the Old West, as seen not only in movies but in the great 19th-century American landscape paintings, the desert rocks, lakeshores and birch forests have a magnificent sweep. What the story might lack in earnestness, the photography, by Jeff Nichols's regular Adam Stone, has a beauty that keeps the faith for a genre that refuses to die entirely." David Edelstein of Vulture wrote "Probably you should clear your head and go in thinking you're going to see a conventional Old West kidnapping adventure story. Then you'll be delighted or possibly irritated when it turns out to be a clown show with instances of carnage." Owen Gleiberman of Variety wrote "Damsel often feels like a ride in slow motion. Yet unlike Blood Simple, which kept twisting itself into new shapes, the twists in this movie don't come thick and fast enough. The most encouraging thing about the Zellner brothers is that they don't overplay their jokes — they savor them [...] That's a refreshingly original thing, though it's not as blow-you-away cool as the filmmakers seem to think it is."

Jeannette Catsoulis of The New York Times wrote "Gorgeously filmed in Utah and on the Oregon shoreline, Damsel may feel 20 minutes too long, but it fills them with attitude and cheek. Here, the frontier is not just a crucible of reinvention, but a wilderness that can make you more than a little crazy." Dana Schwartz of Entertainment Weekly wrote "Far from a perfect film—the morals are clunky, the pacing awkward at points—Damsel still manages to achieve the rare distinction of being both ambitious and just so much goddam fun." Hannah Strong of Little White Lies wrote "The ambition and creativity of the Zellners is admirable, but beneath some initial fancy footwork, there's not much more to see." Todd McCarthy of The Hollywood Reporter wrote "The film is like a steak that's been cooked on one side and not the other; you want to send it back." Mark Jenkins of NPR wrote "Even sympathetic viewers may weary of scenes that routinely last a few breaths too long, or asides that stall more than they amuse. Likable as Damsel is, there's just not much to it, and the Zellners don't improve their modest scenario by stretching it so thin."

Eric Kohn of IndieWire wrote "The downside to the Zellners’ uncompromising approach is that they sometimes hold an inspired moment for too long. Certain scenes drag, and some banter has an airless quality that causes a few gags to fall flat. But it's often rescued by nuggets of hilarious dialogue (“Put your dynamite back on!” and “I'm not the posse type!” are personal favorites) and the steady realization that the movie always has been one step ahead of audience assumptions. The complete raison d’être of this oddball premise doesn't arrive until a bitter final exchange, with a beautiful coda that suggests the story represents a never-ending cycle of lonely obsession." David Sims of The Atlantic wrote "When it's digging into the bleak comedy of Samuel's ridiculous crusade, Damsel is a blast—a worthy spoof of Hollywood's golden-age narrative of men on horseback swooping in and saving the day. But beyond that, there's little else to it." William Bibbiani of TheWrap wrote “Damsel” is the best kind of revisionist Western, with a fresh perspective, and a vital, relevant point to make. That the film's vision is narrowly focused is both the reason for its existence and its sole drawback, a sacrifice at the altar of plot and pacing in order to appease the thematic gods. That sacrifice was clearly accepted. “Damsel” is a spry and illuminating comedy, no matter how many times it repeats its jokes." Peter Travers of Rolling Stone wrote "Damsel won't work for everyone. It's too quirky for that. But it goes its merrily deranged way with prankish enthusiasm and a genuine sense of the absurd [...] In a Hollywood of formulaic hack jobs, the Zellners know how to keep you guessing. Don't knock it. It's a gift."
