= Longmont Potion Castle =

Prank caller

- Origin: Denver, United States
- Genres: Prank call; surreal humor; sound collage; thrash metal; sampling
- Instruments: Vocals; guitar; telephone; answering machine; drums; effects unit; VoIP phone
- Years active: 1986–present
- Labels: D.U.; Vinyl Communications; Post Replica; Insides Music; Reptilian; Kung Fu; Burger
- Website: longmontpotioncastle.com

Longmont Potion Castle is the stage name of a musician and surrealist prank caller from Denver, Colorado, who has been active since 1986. The name is also used for most of his prank call albums, and for the project in general. Details about his personal life are scarce, and his real name is kept a secret. Over the years, his mostly self-published albums have gained a cult following, especially among musicians.

== Biography ==
Longmont Potion Castle has maintained his anonymity throughout his career, though his real name is known to some who have interviewed him. In several calls, recipients have recognized him as Longmont Potion Castle, but not by his real identity.

Longmont Potion Castle started recording "experimental, collage, prank call albums" while he attended Columbine High School. The LA Record describes Longmont Potion Castle's albums as unlike typical prank call albums, writing that his demeanor does not resemble that of The Jerky Boys and Crank Yankers and is closer to that of the alternative comedian Neil Hamburger. Denver's Westword describes LPC as "absurdity as an art form." Actor Rainn Wilson, a fan of LPC, has compared his work to The Marx Brothers at their greatest, and said that "There's a surreal aspect, as if Salvador Dalí were doing prank phone calls."

The anonymous artist has described his albums as "phone work" or "absurdist" art, preferring these labels to the less sophisticated 'prank phone calls'. Calling a wide range of people and organizations, most often within the United States, but sometimes as far afield as Australia, his calls most often involve complaints about noise, requests for money or absurd, non-existent products or services, or crude and unprovoked physical threats. However, his calls are rarely very mean-spirited in nature. His recordings combine prank calls, in which he often modulates or repeats his voice with a Digitech effects unit, with sound collages and his own thrash metal compositions used as interludes and played over soundbites from the preceding calls.

In 2006, Longmont Potion Castle announced his retirement. In an interview with The Nerve Magazine, he explained that the box set Longbox Option Package would be the final LPC release. However, in 2008 he released a new CD, Longmont Potion Castle Volume 6. In 2009, he released Volume 7 (not to be confused with his 2005 album of the same name released as a part of the Longbox Option Package box set, a disc that contained only thrash metal music). The album featured several celebrity calls, including ones to singer Eddie Money, Jeopardy! host Alex Trebek, and guitarist Rick Derringer. January 2011 saw the release of LPC 8, in which the artist primarily used Skype on a laptop computer to record the calls, which he has utilized since.

In 2016, a crowdfunded documentary on Longmont Potion Castle entitled Where in the Hell is the Lavender House? was announced. It was released to select screenings and film festivals in 2019, and received a wider release in 2020.

Longmont Potion Castle had a brief cameo in the 2018 psychological thriller film Cam as a phone operator.

On January 16, 2024, Night Signal Entertainment released Home Safety Hotline, an analog horror game about answering phone calls and sending safety information on how to deal with various pests and cryptids. Over the course of the game, the dispatcher has to deal with numerous modulated and surreal prank calls from a jokester similar to Longmont Potion Castle; by March, developer Nick Lives posted on X that Longmont Potion Castle had become aware of the game's tribute to him. On September 20, 2024, Night Signal Entertainment also published an expansion for the game called "Seasonal Worker." In this DLC, Longmont Potion himself appears as Hudson, an HSH employee tasked with catching a sentient mastermind rodent called the Mouse King.

== Discography ==
=== Albums ===
- Subliminal Propaganda (also known as Longmont Potion Castle) (1986)
- Longmont Potion Castle II (1992)
- Longmont Potion Castle III (1995)
- Longmont Potion Castle Volume 4 (2001)
- Late-Eighties-Vein (2003)
- Longmont Potion Castle 5 (2005)
- Longmont Potion Castle Volume 6 (2008)
- Longmont Potion Castle 7 (2009)
- Longmont Potion Castle 8 (2011)
- Longmont Potion Castle 9 (2012)
- Longmont Potion Castle 10 (2013)
- Longmont Potion Castle 11 (2014)
- Longmont Potion Castle 12 (2015)
- Longmont Potion Castle 13 (2017)
- Longmont Potion Castle 14 (2017)
- Longmont Potion Castle 15 (2018)
- Where in the Hell is the Lavender House? Soundtrack (2018)
- Longmont Potion Castle 16 (2019)
- Tour Line Live (2019)
- Longmont Potion Castle 17 (2020)
- Longmont Potion Castle 18 (2021)
- Longmont Potion Castle 19 (2022)
- Longmont Potion Castle 20 (2023)
- Best Before '24 (2024)
- Alive in '25 (2025)
- The Longmont Potion Castle (2026)

=== Compilations ===
- Best of Longmont Potion Castle – Volume 1 (1996)
- Best of Longmont Potion Castle – Volume 2 (1997)
- Longbox Option Package (2006) Includes volumes 1–5, Late Eighties Vein, Bonus Disc and Bonus DVD
- Longmont Potion Castle Tributes (2010)
- Ultimate Session Bundle (2014) Included virtually every track and video ever produced on a USB thumb drive, included a T-shirt with every album cover as well as a vinyl record. Limited to 50 units total. All 50 sold on first day of availability.
- Official Compact Discography (2016) Included virtually every track and video ever produced in a collector's box, on 24 CDs and 2 DVDs, included a T-shirt, as well as a detailed booklet. Limited to 25 units total. All 25 sold on first day of availability.

=== Collaborative releases ===
- Longmont Potion Castle/Hatebeak split 7-inch (2004)
- The Albert Lerner Trio/Longmont Potion Castle split double LP (2016)

=== Videos ===
- Live from Longmont Potion Castle VHS (1998)
