= Fucked Up Friends =

Studio album by Tobacco
- Released: October 14, 2008
- Recorded: 2007–2008
- Genre: Electronic
- Length: 38:24
- Label: Anticon
- Producer: Tobacco

Tobacco chronology
Fucked Up Friends (2008)	The Allegheny White Fish Tapes (2009)

Professional ratings
Aggregate scores
Source	Rating
Metacritic	73/100
Review scores
Source	Rating
AllMusic	3.5/5 stars
The A.V. Club	A
Cokemachineglow	72/100
NME	8/10
Pitchfork	6.2/10
PopMatters	7/10 stars
Rolling Stone	3.5/5 stars
URB	4/5 stars

Fucked Up Friends is the first studio album by American electronic musician Tobacco. It was released through Anticon on October 14, 2008. Aesop Rock provided vocals on "Dirt".

== Critical reception ==
At Metacritic, which assigns a weighted average score out of 100 to reviews from mainstream critics, the album received an average score of 73% based on 14 reviews, indicating "generally favorable reviews".

Kevin O Donnell of Rolling Stone gave the album 3.5 stars out of 5, calling it "one of the year's best stoner-rock records." Meanwhile, Joe Colly of Pitchfork gave the album a 6.2 out of 10, saying, "as an album, Fucked Up Friends lacks focus and variety."

Jeff Weiss of LA Weekly placed it at number 46 on the "50 Best Albums of the Year" list.

== Track listing ==
No.	Title	Length
1.	"Street Trash"	1:55
2.	"Truck Sweat"	3:09
3.	"Hairy Candy"	3:15
4.	"Hawker Boat"	2:06
5.	"Side 8 (Big Gums Version)"	3:17
6.	"Yum Yum Cult"	1:06
7.	"Berries That Burn"	2:07
8.	"Get My Nails Did"	0:11
9.	"Dirt" (featuring Aesop Rock)	4:01
10.	"Gross Magik"	3:54
11.	"Little Pink Riding Hood"	2:01
12.	"Backwoods Altar"	4:08
13.	"-"	0:05
14.	"Tape Eater"	2:24
15.	"Pink Goo"	2:22
16.	"Grease Wizard"	2:09
Total length:		38:11
