= Tobacco (musician) =

American electronic musician (born 1980)

TOBACCO
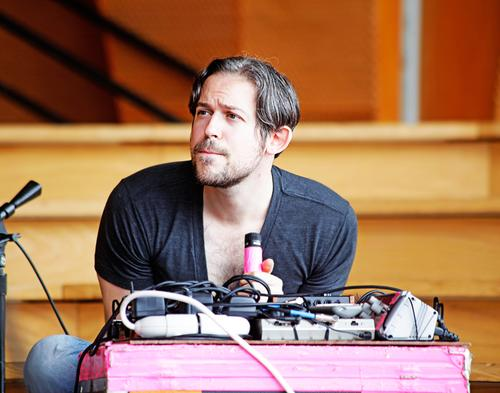

Background information
- Also known as: TOBACCO
- Born: Thomas J. Fec; February 6, 1980 (age 46); Pittsburgh, Pennsylvania, U.S.
- Origin: Allegheny County, Pennsylvania, U.S.
- Genres: Psychedelic rock; electronic; alternative hip hop; experimental; lo-fi; experimental rock; indietronica; IDM; hip hop; industrial
- Occupations: Singer; multi-instrumentalist; producer
- Instruments: Analog synthesizer; vocoder; tape machine; digital audio editor; guitar
- Years active: 1996–present
- Labels: Ghostly International; Rad Cult; Anticon; The 70's Gymnastics Recording Company
- Member of: Black Moth Super Rainbow; Malibu Ken; Demon Queen
- Website: radcult.bigcartel.com/artist/tobacco

Thomas Fec (born February 6, 1980), better known by his stage name Tobacco (stylized in all caps), is an American electronic musician. He is the frontman of the psychedelic rock band Black Moth Super Rainbow, in addition to working as a solo artist. In late 2018, he teamed up with rapper Aesop Rock to become the music duo Malibu Ken, releasing a self-titled album in January 2019.

== History ==
He grew up in Allegheny County, Pennsylvania, and graduated from Hampton High School in 1998 along with bandmate Seth Ciotti. In a 2009 interview with Skyscraper Magazine, Tobacco said that his name derived from "a character that freaked me out as a kid, the Tobacco Man," referring to the character from the film Redneck Zombies. In a 2016 interview with Song Exploder podcast, Tobacco discloses that he doesn't know "any instruments," but that he became enamored with a four-track recorder that his parents gave him while he was in high school.

Tobacco released his first solo album, Fucked Up Friends, on Anticon on October 14, 2008. It was recorded using entirely analog equipment. Rolling Stone said of the album, "one of the year's best stoner-rock records – only it's powered by synths, hip-hop beats and vocoders instead of guitars." Exclaim! called it "worthy of obsessive listening." The album featured a guest appearance from Aesop Rock. A DVD of the album had been released more than a year prior, on September 3, 2007, by The 70's Gymnastics Recording Company.

In February 2010, an e-mail sent out to the Black Moth Super Rainbow/Tobacco e-mail list announced a new CD by Tobacco entitled Maniac Meat that would feature Beck on two tracks titled "Fresh Hex" and "Grape Aerosmith." Tobacco revealed that in making the album, the two exchanged parts for songs via e-mail, and that they had never actually met in person. On March 30, 2010, the website Pitchfork Media released the first song from Maniac Meat titled "Sweatmother". The album came out on May 25 on Anticon.

LA UTI was released on November 9, 2010, on Anticon as a companion piece to Maniac Meat. The EP features underground rappers such as Doseone, Rob Sonic, Serengeti among others. Tobacco produced the track "Glass Coffins" from Antipop Consortium rapper Beans' solo album End It All in 2011. In February 2012 it was announced that Tobacco and Zackey Force Funk were teaming up to release an album under the band name Demon Queen. The album, Exorcise Tape, was released March 8, 2013 on Rad Cult.

Several of Tobacco's songs are featured in the HBO series Silicon Valley, including "Stretch Your Face", which serves as the show's theme song. In 2017, Tobacco toured with Nine Inch Nails and would have opened for them on their September US tour. He would later collaborate with Trent Reznor on the song "Babysitter" from Tobacco's 2020 album Hot Wet and Sassy. In January 2021, Tobacco announced his upcoming album Fucked Up Friends 3 for release some time in the year, alongside a lead single called "This Man".

== Style ==
In an interview with Kotori Magazine in September 2008, Tobacco explained the difference between Black Moth Super Rainbow and Tobacco: "Mostly everything I've done with BMSR is made to be pop. And alot [sic] of people say BMSR is bordering on hip-hop beats. So with Tobacco, I wanted to embrace my beats and get darker and sleeker with it all. I want to make you feel paranoid in a good way. There’s something seriously fucked about workout tapes from the mid 80s, and just about everything obscure on beta tape. They make me feel awful, but really good and curious at the same time. With this Tobacco stuff, I’m trying to translate that feeling."

Tobacco told Song Exploder that he wants his drum beats to sound "as real as possible," so he does not use quantization to perfect the timing. He speaks against music that is too "clean" or "clinical," and notes that his album "Sweatbox Dynasty" features many sounds recorded on the first take.

Tobacco's live shows mainly consist of him and BMSR bandmate The Seven Fields of Aphelion, and an unnamed person from Portland, Oregon, playing along with video projections from Fucked Up Friends and Fucked Up Friends 2.

== Discography ==
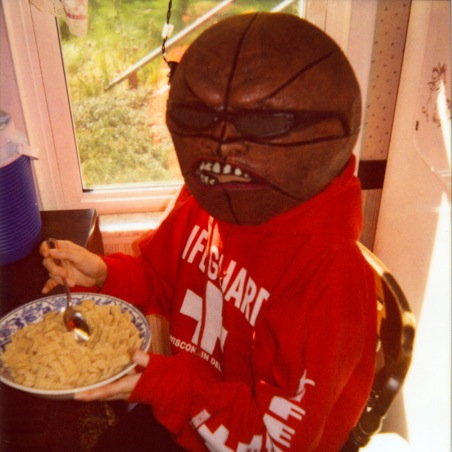
Musician Tom Fec (aka Tobacco) of Black Moth Super Rainbow dressed in traditional garb.

=== Albums ===
- Fucked Up Friends (Anticon, 2008)
- Maniac Meat (Anticon, 2010)
- Ultima II Massage (Ghostly, 2014)
- Sweatbox Dynasty (Ghostly, 2016)
- Hot Wet & Sassy (Ghostly, 2020)
- Fucked Up Friends 3 (Rad Cult, 2021)
- Skids and Angels (Rad Cult, 2022)

=== Singles and EPs ===
- "Fresh Hex" (Anticon, 2010)
- Mystic Thickness (Anticon, 2010)
- LA UTI (Anticon, 2010)
- "Lipstick Destroyer" (Volcom, 2013) - split with Black Bananas
- "Hungry Eyes" (Ghostly, 2020)

=== Compilations ===
- The Allegheny White Fish Tapes (Rad Cult, 2009)
- The Exorcise Tape Instrumentals (Rad Cult, 2015)
- Ripe & Majestic (Instrumental Rarities & Unreleased Beats) (Rad Cult, 2017)
- High on Life, Vol. 1 (Original Soundtrack) (Rad Cult, 2023)
- High on Life 2 (Original Game Soundtrack) Vol. 1 (Rad Cult, 2026)

=== Collaborations ===
- Exorcise Tape (Esorcizzare Nastro) (Rad Cult, 2013) (with Zackey Force Funk as Demon Queen)
- Malibu Ken (Rhymesayers Entertainment, 2019) (with Aesop Rock as Malibu Ken)

=== DVDs ===
- Fucked Up Friends (70s Gymnastics Recording Co., 2007)
- Fucked Up Friends 2 (Rad Cult, 2010)
- Fucked Up Friends 3 (Rad Cult, 2021)

=== Productions ===
- Height with Friends - "Coast Is Clear" from Utility Fog Four (2009)
- Beans – "Glass Coffins" from End It All (2011)
- The Hood Internet – "More Fun" from FEAT (2012) (credited as Tobaxxo)
- Beans - "Cemetery Wind" from Love Me Tonight (2017)

=== Remixes ===
- Genghis Tron – "Relief (Tobacco Remix)" from Board Up the House Remixes Volume 2 (2008)
- Dorosoto – "Emerald Building... (Tobacco Remix)" from Embryonic Audio Restoration (2009)
- Sole and the Skyrider Band – "Battlefields (Tobacco Remix)" from Battlefields (2009)
- Health – "Die Slow (Tobacco Remix)" from Health::Disco2 (2010)
- The Go! Team – "Voice Yr Choice (Tobacco Remix)" from The Go! Team Remixed (2011)
- White Zombie – "Thunderkiss 65 (Tobacco Remix)" from Mondo Sex Head (European Edition) (2012)
- Matthew Dear – "Earthforms (TOBACCO Remix)" from Beams (Expanded Edition) (2013)
- The Red Falcon Projects – "Probotector (Tobacco Remix)" from Ravishing Extras (2013)
- Junip – "Your Life Your Call (Tobacco Remix)" from Walking Lightly EP (2013)
- Principles of Geometry – "Videostore (Tobacco Remix)" from Connie EP (2014)

=== Music videos ===
| Year | Album | Title | Director | Other featured artist |
|---|---|---|---|---|
| 2010 | Maniac Meat | Grape Aerosmith | Allen Cordell | Beck |
| 2010 | Maniac Meat | Motorlicker | TV Carnage | |
| 2012 | Cobra Juicy | Windshield Smasher | Bo Mirhosseni | |
| 2014 | Ultima II Massage | Streaker | Eric Wareheim | Notrabel |
| 2016 | Sweatbox Dynasty | Dimensional Hum | Abraham Dubin | |
| 2018 | Malibu Ken | Acid King | Rob Shaw | Aesop Rock |
| 2018 | Malibu Ken | Corn Maze | Rob Shaw | Aesop Rock |
| 2019 | Malibu Ken | Tuesday | Rob Shaw | Aesop Rock |
| 2020 | Hot, Wet & Sassy | Babysitter | Tobacco | Trent Reznor |
| 2022 | Skids and Angels | The Black Album | Joe Cappa | |
| 2023 | Sweatbox Dynasty | Human Om | n/c | |
