= Peek-A-Boo Records =

- Founded: 1995
- Founder: Travis Higdon
- Genre: Indie rock
- Country of origin: U.S.
- Location: Austin, Texas, U.S.
- Official website: www.peekaboorecords.com

Peek-A-Boo Records is an Austin, Texas based independent record label.

== Current (active) bands ==
- Peel
- The Octopus Project
- Palaxy Tracks

== Alumni (previous bands) ==
- The 1-4-5s
- Black Lipstick
- Drake Tungsten
- Golden Millennium
- Junior Varsity
- The Kiss Offs
- Knife in the Water
- The Prima Donnas
- Silver Scooter
- Spoon
- Super XX Man
- PEEL

== See also ==
- List of record labels
