= Graveface Records =

American independent record label

- Founded: 2000
- Founder: Ryan Graveface
- Distributor: The Business
- Genre: Experimental
- Country of origin: United States
- Location: Savannah, Georgia
- Official website: www.graveface.com

Graveface Records is an American independent record label from Savannah, Georgia, solely owned and operated by Ryan Graveface (who plays in the groups Black Moth Super Rainbow, Dreamend, the Marshmallow Ghosts and the Casket Girls). He has released recordings by Beachy Head, Serengeti, Dosh, The Appleseed Cast, Haley Bonar, Xiu Xiu, Monster Movie, Dreamend, Jakob, Jason Molina, Mount Eerie, The Loose Salute, the Lava Children, Night School, Black Moth Super Rainbow, The Seven Fields of Aphelion, and Whirr.

== See also ==
- List of record labels
