= FEAT (album) =

Studio album by the Hood Internet
- Released: October 2, 2012
- Genres: Electronic; hip-hop; indie rock
- Length: 35:56
- Label: Decon
- Producer: The Hood Internet

The Hood Internet chronology
FEAT (2012)	FEAT Remixes (2012)

FEAT (pronounced "F-E-A-T") is the first studio album by American record production duo the Hood Internet. It was released on Decon on October 2, 2012. It features guest appearances from A.C. Newman, Cadence Weapon, and Class Actress, among others. Music videos were created for "Won't Fuck Us Over", "One for the Record Books", and "More Fun". The remix album, FEAT Remixes, was released on December 18, 2012.

== Critical reception ==
Professional ratings
Aggregate scores
Source	Rating
Metacritic	54/100
Review scores
Source	Rating
AllMusic	3/5 stars
Consequence of Sound	3.5/5 stars
Dusted Magazine	mixed
No Ripcord	4/10
Pitchfork	3.0/10

At Metacritic, which assigns a weighted average score out of 100 to reviews from mainstream critics, the album received an average score of 54, based on 6 reviews, indicating "mixed or average reviews".

Jordan Sargent of Pitchfork gave the album a 3.0 out of 10, writing, "An album of original productions was a logical next step for a group that's been slowly easing its way out of mashup purgatory for years, but FEAT makes it clear that the Hood Internet were not ready." Meanwhile, Amanda Koellner of Consequence of Sound wrote, "It's doubtful that the duo will ever stop mashing up, but it's a damn good time watching them try something new."

Greg Kot of Chicago Tribune placed it at number 3 on the "Top Chicago Indie Albums" year-end list.

== Track listing ==
No.	Title	Length
1.	"Critical Captions" (featuring Class Actress and Cadence Weapon)	3:55
2.	"One for the Record Books" (featuring A.C. Newman and Sims)	3:30
3.	"More Fun" (featuring Psalm One and Tobaxxo)	3:19
4.	"Nothing Should Be a Surprise" (featuring Isaiah Toothtaker and Showyousuck)	3:26
5.	"Exonerated" (featuring Zambri, Hooray for Earth, and Junior Pande)	3:22
6.	"Won't Fuck Us Over" (featuring Annie Hart and BBU)	4:29
7.	"Do You Give Up Now?" (featuring Donwill, My Gold Mask, and Junior Pande)	3:45
8.	"Our Finest China" (featuring The Rosebuds and Astronautalis)	3:47
9.	"Uzi Water Gun" (featuring Kenan Bell, The Chain Gang of 1974, and Millionyoung)	2:38
10.	"These Things Are Nice" (featuring Kid Static, Slow Witch, and Kleenex Girl Wonder)	3:52
Total length:		35:56

== Personnel ==
Credits adapted from liner notes.

- The Hood Internet – production, mixing
- Class Actress – guest appearance (1)
- Cadence Weapon – guest appearance (1)
- A.C. Newman – guest appearance (2)
- Sims – guest appearance (2)
- Psalm One – guest appearance (3)
- Tobaxxo – guest appearance (3)
- Isaiah Toothtaker – guest appearance (4)
- Showyousuck – guest appearance (4)
- Zambri – guest appearance (5)
- Hooray for Earth – guest appearance (5)
- Junior Pande – guest appearance (5, 7)
- Annie Hart – guest appearance (6)
- BBU – guest appearance (6)
- Donwill – guest appearance (7)
- My Gold Mask – guest appearance (7)
- The Rosebuds – guest appearance (8)
- Astronautalis – guest appearance (8)
- Kenan Bell – guest appearance (9)
- The Chain Gang of 1974 – guest appearance (9)
- Millionyoung – guest appearance (9)
- Kid Static – guest appearance (10)
- Slow Witch – guest appearance (10)
- Kleenex Girl Wonder – guest appearance (10)
- Greg Magers – mixing
- Paul Gold – mastering
- Julia Lee Meyer – artwork
