= North Coast Music Festival =

American annual electronic dance music festival held in Chicago

- Genre: Electronic Dance Music
- Dates: Labor Day Weekend
- Locations: SeatGeek Stadium (2021–present), Huntington Bank Pavilion (2019), Union Park (2010–2018)
- Years active: 16
- Founders: Michael Berg, Lucas King, Leif Moravy, Jeff Callahan, Pat Grumley, Mike Raspatello, Max Wagner
- Website: www.northcoastfestival.com

The North Coast Music Festival is held annually in Chicago on Labor Day weekend. Initially featuring a diverse mix of electronic, hip hop, folk, jam band, and rock acts, and a wide variety of performance and installation artists, North Coast evolved to host primarily EDM acts. Up through 2018, the festival was held at Union Park. In 2019, it was held at Huntington Bank Pavilion in Northerly Island. In 2020, the festival did not take place due to the COVID-19 pandemic. The festival has been held at SeatGeek Stadium in Bridgeview, Illinois since 2021.

== Lineups by year ==
=== 2010 ===
North Coast's first festival occurred on September 3–5, 2010 at Union Park in Chicago. The first iteration of the festival received generally positive reviews from the Chicago press including UrChicago which said "this weekend has definitely been one of the highlights of the year. The talent that was raked in for this festival was among some of the best around. This is definitely a festival to keep an eye on in years to come, they brought all they had to the table in 2010 and I'm sure no one left disappointed."

The lineup for the festival in 2010 included The Chemical Brothers, Nas & Damian Marley, Umphrey's McGee, The Disco Biscuits, Lupe Fiasco, Paul Van Dyk, Moby, Benny Benassi, Pretty Lights, De La Soul, Boys Noize, Jay Electronica, The New Deal, Flying Lotus, Benga, Laidback Luke, Mayer Hawthorne, Jakob Dylan, Future Rock, Green Velvet, Holy Ghost!, Dirty Dozen Brass Band, New Mastersounds, Claude VonStroke, Phantogram, Van Ghost, Loyal Divide, Orchard Lounge.

=== 2011 ===
North Coast's second year was held September 2–4 and featured a wider variety of artists including Bassnectar, David Guetta, Zed's Dead, and Major Lazer. This years attendance increased since the debut the year before and sold out days 2 & 3. Reviews were optimistic on the direction of the festival with Consequence of Sound saying, "They call North Coast 'Summer's Last Stand,' and we'd like to keep standing with it for as long as it’ll have us. Any summer that ends with thousands of people dancing in a field together in the cool night air is alright by us."

The lineup for North Coast's sophomore year included: David Guetta, Bassnectar, STS9, Wiz Khalifa, Thievery Corporation, Fat Boy Slim, Common, Rusko, Gogol Bordello, Benny Benassi, Carl Cox, ATB, Lotus, of Montreal, Wolfgang Gartner, Major Lazer, Little Dragon, Future Rock, Zeds Dead, Neon Indian, Big Gigantic, The Budos Band, James Zabiela, SBTRKT, Paper Diamond, Van Ghost, Hood Internet, Orchard Lounge, Rubblebucket, Keys N Krates, Felix Cartal, Auto Body, The Soul Rebels, Lance Herbstrong, California Wives, Midnight Conspiracy, Team Bayside High, Gemini Club, Wyllys, DJ Thibault, Loyal Divide, Probcause, BBU, Zebo, The Coop, Orville Kline, Great Divide, The Ill & The Restless, Mario FLorek.

=== 2012 ===
The 2012 version of North Coast was held August 31–September 2, once again on labor day weekend. The festival continued being promoted as "Summer's Last Stand".

The 2012 lineup included Pretty Lights, Girl Talk, Umphrey's McGee, Axwell, Steve Angello, Knife Party, Atmosphere, Steve Aoki, Excision, Alesso, Paul Oakenfold, Big Boi, The Rapture, EOTO, Digitalism, Chuckie (DJ), Tommy Trash, Yelawolf, Modestep, Felix Da Housecat, Future Rock, Mord Fustang, Yacht, Dan Deacon, Rebirth Brass Band, BoomBox, Digital Tape Machine, King Khan and the Shrines, NiT GriT, Maya Jane Coles, People Under The Stairs, Van Ghost, Com Truise, Savoy, Mr. Muthafuckin' eXquire, Auto Body, Zebo, Family Groove Company, Strange Arrangement, Gentleman Hall

=== 2013 ===
2013 saw North Coast feature a more diverse lineup that deviated from the primarily electronic lineups of past years. The festival was plagued by bad weather that forced two different weather evacuations. Nonetheless the festival was still able to continue mostly as planned and the delays did not cause any serious problems for the festival. The first weather evacuation occurred Friday afternoon in the middle of Capital Cities' set. They were visibly upset everyone was going to have to leave and tried to play "Safe and Sound" after being told to end their performance. The power was cut in the middle of the song forcing their show to end without them being able to play the entirety of their song that would later prove to be their biggest claim to fame. The Chicago Tribune said of the rain "Not just one, but two weather evacuations couldn't fully stop the beats and grooves for fans that headed to Chicago's annual Labor Day weekend festival, North Coast Music Festival."

The 2013 lineup featured Passion Pit, Wu-Tang Clan, Afrojack, Big Gigantic, Nas, The Disco Biscuits, Lotus, Mac Miller, Gary Clark Jr Rebelution, Purity Ring, Laidback Luke, Datsik, Madeon, Skream, Paper Diamond, Claude Von Stroke, Future Rock, Conspirator, RL Grime, Danny Brown, Aloe Blacc, Aluna George, Just Blaze, Capital Cities, Seven Lions, JC Brooks, El Ten Eleven, Cherub, Poolside, Flatbrush Zombies, On An On, Bondax, Midnight Conspiracy, The Knocks, DVBBS, Herobust, Zoogma, Dean Cohen, Manic Focus, Thibault, K. Flay, Ghost Beach, Porn and Chicken, Ghost House.

=== 2014 ===
North Coast's 5th anniversary was held August 29–31 and saw the fest expand through Union Park allowing a higher capacity of fans to attend. The Chicago Tribune said "This year the festival grounds were expanded, allowing for an increased capacity of 20,000 per day. Saturday and Sunday sold out, and Friday drew 19,000 fans."

The 2014 lineup featured: Bassnectar, Kid Cudi, STS9, Snoop Dogg, Alesso, Nicky Romero, Dada Life, Zeds Dead, Dr Dog, Little Dragon, Slightly Stoopid, theNEWDEAL, Adventure Club, Griz, Showtek, Wolfgang Gartner, W&W, Action Bronson, Boombox, Cashmere Cat, Chet Faker, Emancipator Ensemble, The Floozies, Future Islands, Future Rock, Keys N Krates, Lettuce, Papadosio, Riff Raff, Washed Out, What So Not, Wild Belle, Auto Body, Bad Bad Not Good, Break Science, Cosby Sweater, Dopapod, Grandtheft, J Philp, Midnight Conspiracy, Milk N Cookies, The Motet, Muzzy, The Nth Power, Ookay, Orchard Lounge, Porn and Chicken, Probcause, Thibault

=== 2015 ===
In 2015 North Coast returned to Chicago's Union Park during Labor Day weekend, September 4–6. This years festival saw the return of the silent disco and "Living Gallery" art exhibit.

The lineup for 2015 included: Widespread Panic, D'Angelo and the Vanguard, The Chemical Brothers, Knife Party, Chromeo, Atmosphere, The Glitch Mob, Porter Robinson, Portugal the Man, Wale, Steve Aoki, The Roots, The Disco Biscuits, Tycho, Gold Panda, Joe Russo, Rac, Booka Shade, Galactic, Jauz, Manic Focus, Shpongle, Future Rock, Green Velvet, Kill The Noise, Snails, SOJA, Twin Shadow, Wax Tailor, Dirty Dozen Brass Band, Exmag, Leather Corduroys, Humans, Leikeli47, Lili K, Michal Menert, Phoebe Ryan, Sweater Beats, Goldfish, Haywyre, Ne-Hi, Porn and Chicken, Nahko & Medicine for the People, The Main Squeeze

=== 2016 ===
North Coast took place September 2–4 in Union Park. The lineup for 2016 included Odesza, Bassnectar, Zedd, Umphrey's McGee, Logic, Grouplove, The Claypool Lennon Delirium, Galantis, Action Bronson, Juicy J, Greensky Bluegrass, Sleigh Bells, Keys N Krates, Zomboy, Ty Dolla $ign, Matoma, Sam Feldt, Raury, The Revivalists, Vulfpeck, Stick Figure, Big Wild.

=== 2017 ===
In 2017 North Coast occurred September 1–3 in Union Park with deadmau5 & Eric Prydz, Damian Marley, and Ween as headliners. Other artists on the lineup included: Gucci Mane, Bonobo, Lil Dicky, Lettuce, BadBadNotGood, STS9, Carnage, Big Boi, Joe Russo's Almost Dead, Post Malone, Manic Focus, Don Diablo, A Tribe Called Red, Primus, Tipper, Skepta, Hippie Sabotage, Bob Moses, Destructo, and The Cool Kids.

=== 2018 ===
Returning to Union Park, North Coast took place August 31–September 2 with Miguel, Axwell & Ingrosso, DJ Snake & Jamiroquai as headliners. This was the first time since 2005 Jamiroquai performed in Chicago, with Coachella being the first of a few returning US dates. Severe weather forced attendees to evacuate the festival grounds Friday and Saturday, resulting in the cancellation of headliner performances from each day. Attendees of both days were allowed to attend Sunday free of charge.

Other artists included: Snails, DVSN, Smokepurpp, Juice Wrld, Too Many Zooz, Barclay Crenshaw, Vulfpeck, The Revivalists, RL Grime, Cashmere Cat, The Strumbellas, Robert Delong, Yellow Claw, Gramatik, Mura Masa, Moon Taxi, Jacob Banks, Rapsody, The Midnight, and Cry Wolf.

=== 2019 ===
In 2019, North Coast took place August 30–31 in Huntington Bank Pavilion on Northerly Island. This marked a new era for North Coast as it changed its focus to primarily electronic music and its sub-genres. The lineup included Anna Lunoe, Bassnectar, Big Wild, Flux Pavilion, Gorgon City, Jai Wolf, Jauz, Major Lazer, Ookay, SG Lewis, Snakehips, SoDown, Tchami, Wooli, and Yung Bae.

=== 2021 ===
After a 2020 hiatus due to the COVID-19 pandemic, North Coast took place September 3–5, 2021 at SeatGeek Stadium in Bridgeview, Illinois. Kaskade, GRiZ, Zeds Dead, Louis the Child, Ganja White Night, and Rezz were the headliners with many more artists in attendance.

=== 2022 ===
North Coast returned to SeatGeek Stadium in Bridgeview, Illinois from September 2–4, 2022. Headliners included Armin van Buuren, Fisher, Illenium, Diplo, Porter Robinson, and Kaytranada. Other artists included Gryffin, Jai Wolf, Madeon, Said the Sky, Seven Lions, Slander (DJs), and Subtronics.

=== 2023 ===
North Coast returned to SeatGeek Stadium in Bridgeview, Illinois from September 1–3, 2023. Headliners included Marshmello, Alesso, Liquid Stranger, Duke Dumont, Zeds Dead, Ganja White Night, DJ Snake, Lane 8, Flume, Alison Wonderland, Big Gigantic, Nghtmre, and Chris Lake. Other artists who made their appearances included Valentino Khan, Chris Lorenzo, Black Tiger Sex Machine, Surf Mesa, Zomboy, MK, Dabin, Elderbrook, Blond:ish, Sultan & Shepard, A Hundred Dreams, Le Youth, Kyle Watson, Wuki, and Yung Bae.

* Bold lettering indicates artist-curated takeover.

== See also ==
- List of electronic music festivals
- Riot Fest
- Lollapalooza
- Spring Awakening Music Festival
- Beyond Wonderland
