= The Hood Internet =

US musical group

- Origin: Chicago, Illinois
- Genre: Mashup
- Years active: 2007–present
- Label: Decon
- Members: Aaron Brink; Steve Reidell
- Website: www.thehoodinternet.com

The Hood Internet is an American record production duo based in Chicago, Illinois, specializing in mashups. It is composed of Aaron Brink (ABX) and Steve Reidell (STV SLV).

== History ==
In 2007, the Hood Internet started posting the mashup tracks to their website. New York categorized the duo's mashup track of Chris Brown and A. C. Newman, titled "Drug Drug Kiss Kiss", in the "lowbrow" and "brilliant" quadrant of their Approval Matrix in 2007.

The Hood Internet produced BBU's "Please, No Pictures", which was included in BBU's Bell Hooks mixtape in 2012. The duo entirely produced Max B and Isaiah Toothtaker's Toothy Wavy. It was released on Mishka in May 2012.

Their first album of original material, titled FEAT, was released on Decon in September 2012. It featured guest appearances from Class Actress, Cadence Weapon, Tobacco, Hooray for Earth, Sims, and Kleenex Girl Wonder, among others. The remix album, FEAT Remixes, was released in December 2012.

Steve Reidell is also a member of Air Credits along with rapper Showyousuck. Their debut album, Broadcasted, was released in 2016.

== Album Tacos ==
They are also the creators of the Tumblr blog named Album Tacos. The website combines iconic album covers with images of tacos and/or references to tacos. On June 20, 2011, it was listed by Phoenix New Times as Tumblr of the Week.

== Discography ==
=== Studio albums ===
- FEAT (2012)

=== Remix albums ===
- The Hood Internet (2011)
- FEAT Remixes (2012)
- II (2015)

=== EPs ===
- Out of the Ordinary (2014)

=== Singles ===
- "Chi City" b/w "Tonight Is Enough" (2010) (with Kid Static)

=== Mixtapes ===
The Hood Internet Mixtape Volume One (2007)

No.	Title	Artist(s)	Length
1.	"Intro"	D.C. LaRue - "Indescreet"	0:22
2.	"I'm Shinin' Like a Crystal"	The Pack vs. Crystal Castles	2:10
3.	"Girls Just Wanna Fix Up"	Dizzee Rascal vs. Cyndi Lauper	2:25
4.	"Put It on My Chk Chk Chk"	Rhymefest vs. !!!	2:00
5.	"Push It to the Alalimit"	Rick Ross vs. CSS (band)	2:39
6.	"Stuntin' Like Black Rock"	Birdman & Lil' Wayne vs. Black Rock	2:52
7.	"Cyborg Umbrella"	Rihanna feat. Jay-Z vs. Menomena vs. M83	1:39
8.	"Some Cut Like a Knife"	Trillville feat. Cutty vs. The Knife	2:47
9.	"Drop the Icebox Pressure"	Omarion vs. Mylo	2:45
10.	"Great! There It Is"	Tag Team vs. LCD Soundsystem	1:28
11.	"My Moon My Shawty"	Lloyd vs. Feist	2:08
12.	"Rock Yo Sea Legs"	Crime Mob feat. Lil' Scrappy vs. The Shins	1:48
13.	"It's E.S.P. Bitches"	Swizz Beatz vs. Deerhoof	1:53
14.	"Fire It Up, Firemouse"	Lil Wayne vs. Modest Mouse	1:51
15.	"Absorb the Lip Gloss"	Lil Mama vs. Marnie Stern	2:20
16.	"B-Boy Battles"	Mos Def vs. Battles	1:05
17.	"Wouldn't Grip Far"	The Game feat. Kanye West vs. The Go! Team	2:16
18.	"That's That Whirlwind"	Snoop Dogg feat. R. Kelly vs. Architecture in Helsinki	2:22
19.	"What U Know About Transparent Things"	T.I. vs. Fujiya & Miyagi	3:01
20.	"All My Scrubs"	TLC vs. Led Zeppelin	1:52
21.	"Give It to My Boy From School"	Timbaland feat. Nelly Furtado & Justin Timberlake vs. Hot Chip	3:03
22.	"Lose My Waters of Naza(b)reath"	Destiny's Child vs. Justice	2:43
23.	"The Ghostface of You Lingers"	Ghostface Killah feat. Jacki-O vs. Spoon	2:15
24.	"Snatch Da Crystal Cat Back"	Khia vs. Dan Deacon	2:19
25.	"I'm a Flirt (Shoreline)"	R. Kelly feat. T-Pain & T.I. vs. Broken Social Scene	3:26
26.	"North America Walk It Out (UNK Soundsystem)"	DJ UNK vs. LCD Soundsystem	3:15
27.	"Outro"		0:26

The Hood Internet Mixtape Volume Two (2007)

No.	Title	Artist(s)	Length
1.	"I Believe You Should Looka Here"	Rich Boy vs. Simian Mobile Disco	2:34
2.	"Tambourine Reckoning"	Swizz Beatz vs. Radiohead	2:37
3.	"When The Last Time I Left You"	Clipse vs. The Avalanches	3:06
4.	"The Next Collarbone"	Dr. Dre feat. Snoop Dogg & Nate Dogg vs. Fujiya & Miyagi	2:01
5.	"We Share Our Mother's Jumper Cables"	Aesop Rock vs. The Knife	2:07
6.	"Take Control of Da Funk"	Amerie vs. Daft Punk	3:14
7.	"Genesis Squared"	Genesis vs. Justice	2:31
8.	"Damn Girl, I Wanna Be Your Lover"	Kid Sister vs. Prince	1:23
9.	"Don't Cha Wish Your Girlfriend Was Shy"	The Pussycat Dolls feat. Busta Rhymes vs. Matthew Dear	2:52
10.	"Everyday I'm Ghosthustlin"	Rick Ross vs. Ghosthustler vs. Wilco	2:24
11.	"There's No MIMS in Threesome"	MIMS vs. Interpol	1:43
12.	"Takin' Over in the Morning"	DJ Khaled feat. Akon, Birdman, Fat Joe, Lil Wayne, Rick Ross, & T.I. vs. Junior Boys	3:37
13.	"Dance with Shrapnell"	Whitney Houston vs. Isolée	1:09
14.	"Finallipopsichord"	CeCe Peniston vs. Black Moth Super Rainbow	1:16
15.	"Sci-Fi Kid" (by Blitzen Trapper)	The Hood Internet Remix feat. Shout Out Out Out Out & Dr. Roxanne Shanté	2:45
16.	"Poppin' Bottles of Soup"	Birdman & Lil Wayne vs. Tunng	3:02
17.	"I Was an International Player"	UGK feat. Andre 3000 vs. TV on the Radio	2:55
18.	"Marchogi a Gwyri"	Blak Jak & Project Pat vs. Gruff Rhys	2:51
19.	"I Don't Blame You for Shinin' and Grindin'"	Clipse vs. Cat Power	2:34
20.	"Drug Drug Kiss Kiss"	A.C. Newman vs. Chris Brown	1:44
21.	"Thoia Thellac"	R. Kelly vs. Shellac	2:45
22.	"The Meantime in the Dirty South"	Goodie Mob vs. The Futureheads	1:10
23.	"Beautiful Girls in Magic Positions"	Sean Kingston vs. Patrick Wolf	1:54
24.	"Our Boyz"	M.I.A. vs. Ocelot	2:28
25.	"This Is How We Go"	Montell Jordan vs. Arcade Fire	1:46
26.	"Pourin' Up Vibrations"	Pimp C feat. Bun B & Mike Jones vs. Ghostland Observatory	2:31
27.	"Crank Dat Pogo"	Soulja Boy Tell 'Em vs. Digitalism	3:45
28.	"Hurricane Like a Promethean Chris"	Hurricane Chris vs. Of Montreal	1:56
29.	"If I Could Rock (It Would Feel Like This)"	R. Kelly vs. Jens Lekman	3:19

The Hood Internet vs. Chicago (2008)
1. "Intro"
2. "Pro Nails Forever" (Kid Sister vs. Walter Meego)
3. "Frog Minutes" (Shawnna vs. LMNOP)
4. "Cakeicide" (Hollywood Holt vs. The Prairie Cartel)
5. "Juke and Pop" (Mic Terror vs. Green Velvet)
6. "Superbowl Jesus" (Kanye West & 1985 Chicago Bears vs Wilco)
7. "Trenchache" (Juice vs. Liz Phair)
8. "80s Problems" (Tha Basix vs. Mahjongg)
9. "When Baby Mamas Collide" (Qualo vs. Chin Up Chin Up)
10. "Simple X-plosion" (Diverse vs. Andrew Bird)
11. "Your Love Iz What It Iz" (The Cool Kids vs. Frankie Knuckles)
12. "Sisters of Chicago-Rillas" (Rhymefest vs. The Changes)
13. "I Ain't That Bowie" (Twista vs. The Sea and Cake)
14. "Hay Electric" (Crucial Conflict vs. Reds and Blue)
15. "Watch My Big Feet Jump" (Dude 'n Nem & Twista vs. Office)
16. "Ten-Day High" (Do or Die & Kanye West vs. Tortoise)
17. "Eatchyo Stigmata" (Yea Big + Kid Static vs. Ministry)
18. "Smash That There" (Yung Berg vs. The Smashing Pumpkins)
19. "Stages Of Standby" (Psalm One vs. Kleenex Girl Wonder)
20. "Can You Eat Some More Heavy Fists of Love?" (Kanye West & GLC vs. Bumps, Terminal 4, & Big Black)
21. "I Used to Love the Blue Line" (Common vs. Bang! Bang!)
22. "I Gotcha Trees" (Lupe Fiasco vs. May or May Not)
23. "What Chu Like, Old Mare?" (Da Brat vs. Sleep Out)
24. "Kells-Tone for the Painfully in Love" (R. Kelly vs. Casiotone for the Painfully Alone)
The Hood Internet Mixtape Volume Three (2008)
1. "Intro" (Ninjasonik vs. Air France)
2. "Shut Up, American Boy" (Estelle feat. Kanye West vs. The Ting Tings)
3. "Blind Speed" (Rick Ross feat. R. Kelly vs. Hercules & Love Affair)
4. "Don't Stop the Fancy Footwork" (Chromeo vs. Rihanna)
5. "Light Falsetto Music" (The-Dream vs. Cut Copy)
6. "Inner Island (The Hood Internet Remix)" (El Perro Del Mar)
7. "Sunrise of Hearts" (Stacey Q vs. Yeasayer)
8. "Hold On to That Low" (Flo Rida feat. T-Pain vs. Hot Chip)
9. "Bomb Deprivation" (New Young Pony Club vs. Simian Mobile Disco)
10. "Dey Know Obscene Strategies" (Shawty Lo vs. Trans Am)
11. "Fuck That, I Defy" (Three 6 Mafia vs. Joan As Policewoman)
12. "Say Someway" (Wiz Khalifa vs. The Black Ghosts)
13. "Sentimental Hearts" (Ludacris vs. She & Him)
14. "Stilettos in the Park" (Crime Mob vs. The Dodos)
15. "We Are Mikey! We Are Rock!" (The Cool Kids vs. Le Loup)
16. "I Do Brooklyn When I Want" (Jay-Z feat. Lil Wayne vs. Xiu Xiu)
17. "Drippy I-N-D-E-P-E-N-D-E-N-T" (Webbie vs. Black Moth Super Rainbow)
18. "Knocking Fablez Down" (Pimp C feat. Lil Keke vs. The New Pornographers)
19. "Apollo Narrows" (Ghostface Killah vs. Caribou)
20. "Got Your Smoke" (Ol' Dirty Bastard feat. Kelis vs. White Williams)
21. "My Favorite Ladytrons" (MF Doom vs. Ladytron)
22. "Frozen Age" (T-Pain feat. Chris Brown vs. TV on the Radio)
23. "$100 Million Sportswear" (Birdman feat. DJ Khaled, Rick Ross vs. Sebastien Tellier vs. SebastiAn)
24. "Shawty Get Looks" (Lil Mama feat. Chris Brown, T-Pain vs. MSTRKRFT)
25. "Gallery Piece Of Everything" (Bun B feat. Rick Ross, David Banner, 8Ball vs. Of Montreal)
26. "Can You Hear My Kids Now" (Lil' Kim feat. Missy Elliott vs. MGMT)
27. "Mirando Birdfool" (The Cardigans vs. Ratatat)
28. "You Make Lovin' Harder, Better, Faster, Stronger" (Fleetwood Mac vs. Daft Punk)
29. "Lolli Lolli Pop That Century" (Three 6 Mafia vs. The Long Blondes)
30. "We Are from Venice (Lil Weezy Ana)" (Lil Wayne vs. The Bloody Beetroots)
31. "Blazin Kryptonite" (Big Boi feat. Purple Ribbon All-Stars vs. Ghislain Poirier)
32. "Bumpangel" (Spank Rock vs. Burial)
33. "The Year This Club Broke (My Heart)" (Usher feat. Young Jeezy vs. Los Campesinos!)
34. "Endless Hookup" (R. Kelly feat. Huey vs. Rogue Wave)
The Mixtape Volume Four (2009)
1. "Intro" (MGMT – "Electric Feel" and Sufjan Stevens – "Movement IV: Traffic Shock")
2. David Banner vs. Fujiya & Miyagi – "Get Like Pterodactyls"
3. Beastie Boys vs. Matt and Kim – "Good Ol' Fashion Rump Shaker"
4. Kanye West vs. Cage & Aviary – "Touch the Television"
5. Lil Wayne (feat. Babyface) vs. Röyksopp – "Comfortable Up Here"
6. Passion Pit vs. Juvenile – "Back That Sleepyhead Up"
7. DJ Jazzy Jeff & The Fresh Prince vs. Daft Punk – "Summer Circuit"
8. Public Enemy vs. HEALTH vs. Nosaj Thing – "Bring the Tabloid Sores"
9. AZ (feat. Ghostface Killah) vs. The Golden Filter – "Solid Gold from New York"
10. Modest Mouse vs. Kanye West – "Floating Paranoia"
11. Clipse vs. Yuksek – "Kinda Like a Big Break"
12. Weezer vs. Glass Candy – "Buddy Holly's Imagination"
13. Bangers & Cash vs. Bag Raiders – "Bang Raiders"
14. Amanda Blank vs. VEGA – "No Reasons to Like You Better"
15. Michael Jackson vs. Ratatat – "Billie "Wildcat" Jean"
16. Kid Sister (feat. Pitbull) vs. Phonat – "Free Control Ocho"
17. Twista (feat. Erika Shevon) vs. Boys Noize – "Wetter and Jeffer"
18. Flo Rida (feat. Ke$ha) vs. MSTRKRFT – "1000 Times Right Round"
19. R. Kelly (feat. Keri Hilson) vs. Sally Shapiro – "Number One Christmas"
20. Drake vs. The Rapture – "Best Jealous Lover I Ever Had"
21. Bon Iver vs. Friendly Fires vs. Aeroplane – "Lump Sum of Paris"
22. Jeremih vs. Handsome Furs – "Birthday Furs"
23. Yung LA vs. Solid Gold – "Who Ain't I Gonna Run to?"
24. Major Lazer (feat. Santigold) vs. Dirty Projectors – "Hold the Stillness"
25. Dead Prez vs. Grizzly Bear – "Two Weeks of Hip Hop"
26. Soulja Boy vs. Joe Jackson – "Swaggin' Out"
27. OJ Da Juiceman (feat. Gucci Mane) vs. Discovery – "Make the Loop Say Aye"
28. Glasses Malone vs. Chromatics – "A Moment to Remember Haterz"
29. Paper Route Gangstaz vs. Animal Collective – "Animals Collecting Money"
30. B-Hamp vs. Little Boots – "Ricky Bobby Boots"
31. Ghostface Killah vs. Beirut – "Save Me Concubine"
32. Keri Hilson vs. The Glitch Mob/TV On The Radio – "Red Dress Turnin Me On"
33. Dorrough vs. Bibio – "Fire Ant Paint Job"
34. "Outro" (Usher – "Love in this Club" vs. Charlie Schmidt – "Cool Cat")
Anatomy Magazine's The Great American Mixtape: Side A (2010)
1. Jay-Z (feat. Pharrell) x LCD Soundsystem – "Just Wanna Dance Yrself Clean"
2. Outkast x Dirty Projectors – "Ms. Jackson's Chamber"
3. 50 Cent x Ratatat – "Have a Billar by Me"
4. Ludacris (feat. Pharrell) x Rilo Kiley – "Moneymaking Money Maker That Makes Money"
5. Wu Tang Clan x Javelin – "C.R.E.A.M. Theme"
6. GZA x Sonic Youth – "Beneath the Candle"
7. Lil' Troy (feat. Fat Pat and Yungstar) x TV On The Radio – "Wanna Be a Wolf Like Me"
8. Clipse x Clap Your Hands Say Yeah – "Clipse Your Hands Say Wamp Wamp"
9. Asher Roth x The Pains of Being Pure at Heart – "I Love Friction"
10. Devin The Dude (feat. Andre 3000) x Les Savy Fav – "What Would Devin Do?"
11. Gucci Mane (feat. .45) x The Drums – "Aw Never Drop My Man"
12. Omarion x Julian Casablancas – "I Get the Hang of It"
13. DJ Assault x Deerhunter – "Deer Assault"
14. Three 6 Mafia (feat. Chamillionaire) x The Hold Steady – "Doe Boys and Fresh Girls in America"
Mishka Presents: Trillwave (2010)
1. Phoenix x Why? – "Shoeing Horses in 1901"
2. Young Money x Javelin – "DepRock"
3. The-Dream x Kevin Drew – "Bodhi Shawty Weekend"
4. Air x Mike Jones – "La Femme D'Monsieur Jones"
5. Kanye West feat. Lil Wayne x DJ Signify – "1993 Barry Bonds"
6. Pharaohe Monch x The Black Lips – "Drop I Mayor"
7. Birdman x Washed Out – "Feel It on the South Side"
8. Doom x The Flaming Lips – "Air You a Hypnotist?"
9. Lloyd Banks feat. Juelz Santana x Neon Indian – "Beamer, Drips"
10. Jay Electronica x Toro Y Moi – "Freak Exhibit"
11. Jamie Foxx x Röyksopp – "Alcohol Forever"
12. Mando Diao – "Dance with Somebody (Hood Internet Remix feat. GZA & Cadence Weapon)"
13. Hieroglyphics x Genesis (band) – "That's Who"
14. Gucci Mane feat. Plies x Lindstrøm & Christabelle – "Wasted Love"
15. Big L x Bibio – "Dwrcan 'Em Up"
16. Puff Daddy feat. The LOX x Volcano Choir – "All About the Islands"
17. Iyaz x The Big Pink – "Velvet Replay"
18. Ice Cube x CFCF – "It Was a Rainy Day"
19. Anti-Pop Consortium x Maps – "I Dream of Capricorn"
20. Aesop Rock feat. Rob Sonic x Tobacco – "Dark Pink Goo"
21. Dominique Young Unique x Yacht – "I'm in Love with a Hot Girl"
22. De La Soul x Jamie Lidell – "What's the Stakes"
23. Jay-Z x Phoenix – "And the Definitive Winner Is..."
24. Trey Songz x The Radio Dept. – "Trey-dio Departmentz"
25. Drake x Beach House – "Walk in the Park Is Over"
The Hood Internet Mixtape Volume Five (2011)
1. Intro [R. Kelly x Drake x Ally Sheedy x Tim Blaney]
2. Bars In The AM [Ninjasonik x !!!]
3. L is For Love Junkie [Donwill x Harlems Cash x Peter Hadar x El Perro Del Mar x Caribou]
4. Hot Tub Freaks Like You [Slug x MURS x Tobacco]
5. Rude Baptism [Rihanna x Crystal Castles]
6. Ariel Pink's Haunted Graffiti - Round And Round (The Hood Internet remix)
7. Moar Doo Wop N Whatever [Lauryn Hill x Deadmau5]
8. Show Me Red Lights [Robin S. x Holy Fuck]
9. Psycho Break [Talking Heads x Ellen Allien & Apparat]
10. Show Me The O.N.E [Yeasayer x Jump Jump Dance Dance x Grum]
11. Back You [Cee-Lo Green x Sir Mix-a-Lot]
12. Freeze, Barbra! [Young Dro x Gucci Mane x Duck Sauce]
13. Blowin' Money At The Deli [Drake x Birdman x Delorean]
14. It's Front Row Love [Metric x Treasure Fingers]
15. Giving Up The Sunshowers [M.I.A. x Vampire Weekend]
16. Ignition (Keep It Remixing Louder) [R. Kelly x Major Lazer]
17. Chi Citizens [BBU x Broken Bells]
18. How Purple Can You Go [Ludacris x Joker & Ginz]
19. Swag Boost [Soulja Boy x Rusko]
20. Lorem Ipsum Dolor Sit Amet [Waka Flocka Flame x Flock Of Seagulls]
21. Cards And Quarters And Green Lights [Local Natives x John Legend x Andre 3000]
22. Oh My Kids [Usher x Sleigh Bells]
23. Virginia Is For Cameras [Clipse x Matt & Kim]
24. Dougie Vision [Cali Swag District x Toro Y Moi]
25. This Shit Was (All I Know) [Drake x Free Energy]
26. Brigade & Yellow [Wiz Khalifa x The Go! Team]
27. Shutterbugg In Miami [Big Boi x Foals]
28. Nuthin' But A Journal Thang [Dr. Dre x Snoop Dogg x Class Actress]
29. The XX Gon Give It To Ya [DMX x The XX]
30. Outro [John Barry x Faith No More x Larry David x Robin Bartlett]
The Hood Internet Mixtape Volume Six (2012)
1. Move Up [Wiz Khalifa x Phantogram]
2. One Midnight With You [Mayer Hawthorne x M83]
3. Fuck With Mo' Money [Ma$e x Notorious B.I.G. x Penguin Prison]
4. Power² [Kanye West x Snap!]
5. Don't Play No Trash [Beastie Boys x Santigold x Weird Tapes]
6. Some Creeps [TLC x Holy Ghost!]
7. Polish City [Tyga x Neon Indian]
8. What's My Noise [Snoop Dogg x Dillon Francis x Kill The Noise]
9. World Of Swimsuits [The Cool Kids x Ford & Lopatin]
10. Houdin-o-mite [Taio Cruz x Foster The People]
11. Tripped And Didn't Stop [Only Children x YACHT]
12. Make It Rezz [Travis Porter x Daft Punk]
13. When The Night Knows [Whitney Houston x Chromeo]
14. How Deep Is Your Thong? [Sisqo x The Rapture x A-Trak]
15. Hello Something [Dragonette x The Kickdrums x Kutcorners]
16. Burn It Again [Sims x Win Win]
17. Knife Rack [YC x Knife Party]
18. GANGS&M [tUnE-yArDs x Rihanna]
19. The Way Marvin Was [Big Sean x Kanye West x Wolfgang Gartner]
20. Ride Some Chords [Quad City DJs x Deadmau5]
21. Hard And Gone [Ace Hood x The Black Keys]
22. On My Wildfire [Wiz Khalifa x Too $hort x SBTRKT]
23. Look At My City [Chris Brown x Busta Rhymes x Rustie]
24. City Luuks [Flosstradamus x Kid Sister x Symmetry]
25. Gucci Goth [Kreayshawn x Gang Gang Dance]
26. Nightchain [Wale x Rick Ross x Kavinsky]
Mishka Presents: Trillwave 3 (2013)
1. Ghostface Killah x Vampire Weekend [Beware Of The Young Lion]
2. Equal Shot [French Montana x Beach House]
3. Royall Inside [Andre 3000 x Bondax]
4. Doin' It Good [Kanye West x T. Pain x Daft Punk]
5. Family Mallets [Mary J. Blige x James Pants]
6. Frownin Remix [Gunplay x Isaiah Toothtaker x Sasac]
7. You Act Right [Yo Gotti x Young Jeezy x Bibio]
8. Deny Strings [Fabolous x Nate Dogg x Mayer Hawthorne x Classixx]
9. Bring Em Out For You [TI x Young Galaxy]
10. Fall The Time [Jeremih x Natasha Mosley x Lil Wayne x Rhye]
11. Bad Girl Strut [MIA x Flying Lotus]
12. Default Lane [Nicki Minaj x Atoms For Peace]
13. Hiooodflame [Mic Terror x Sinjin Hawke]
14. Nnormal Sshame [Freddie Gibbs x BJ the Chicago Kid x Javelin]
15. The Thing U Do [Miguel x Shlohmo x RL Grime]
16. Devotion Welcomed [Trinidad James x Jessie Ware x Dave Okumu]
17. More Bound Than You [Kanye West x Flume]
18. Say Yr Name [Destiny's Child x Slow Magic]
19. Union Motivation [Little Dragon x Jim Jonsin x Rico Love]
20. Close 2 Justice [Kendrick Lamar x Drake x Giraffage]
21. So Many Climaxes [Usher x Toro Y Moi]
22. Paracosm Of Applause [Waka Flocka Flame x Washed Out]
23. Exquisite Party [Beyonce x Of Montreal]
The Hood Internet Mixtape Volume Seven (2013)
1. "Val Get Worse" (King Louie x Divine Fits)
2. "Pesobedear" (A$AP Rocky x Purity Ring)
3. "212-PARADISE" (Azealia Banks x YACHT)
4. "Turn On The Happiness" (Futurex Van She x Robotaki)
5. "All Gold Shuriken" (Trinidad James x Madeon)
6. "Cashin' Goods" (Ca$h Out x Totally Enormous Extinct Dinosaurs)
7. "Gangz A Make Her Dance" (Juicy J x Black Moth Super Rainbow)
8. "Still In These Eyes" (B.o.B x T.I. x Juicy J x Crystal Castles)
9. "Disparate Bandz" (Katie Got Bandz x Santigold x The 2 Bears)
10. "Double Talm" (Chance The Rapper x Girl Unit)
11. "I'll Be Country" (Big KRIT x Ludacris x Passion Pit)
12. "Won't Fuck Us Over 2.0" (BBU x Annie Hart x Clams Casino)
13. "Magic Adventure" (Future x T.I. x Clicks & Whistles)
14. "See Youth" (Usher x Rick Ross x Santigold)
15. "Goooo In Paris" (Jay-Z x Kanye West x TNGHT)
16. "Five Seconds Don't Care" (Waka Flocka Flame x Twin Shadow)
17. "Get Off The Zeppelin" (Action Bronson x Tame Impala)
18. "Shook Bolts Pt. II" (Mobb Deep x Melé)
19. "While I'm Different" (2 Chainz x STRFKR)
20. "Grown Up Has No Trigger" (Danny Brown x Dirty Projectors)
21. "Zero Drum Thirty" (Aesop Rock x Ohama x J.Rocc)
22. "Mottovision" (Drake x Lil Wayne x Kavinsky)
23. "Lucky Suit" (Justin Timberlake x Jay-Z x Daft Punk)
24. "Pyramidspeak" (Purity Ring x Frank Ocean)
25. "Dancing On My Pyramids" (Robyn x Frank Ocean)
The Hood Internet Mixtape Volume Eight (2014)
1. "Sock It 2 Summer" - (Missy Elliott - "Sock It 2 Me" x Blood Cultures - "Indian Summer")
2. "You Know You Like Gas" - (Sage the Gemini & Iamsu! - "Gas Pedal" x AlunaGeorge - "You Know You Like It")
3. "Infinite Starts" - (Drake - "Started from the Bottom" x RL Grime & Baauer - "Infinite Daps")
4. "Fall In Cake" - (Drake feat. Jay Z - "Pound Cake / Paris Morton Music 2" x Phantogram - "Fall In Love")
5. "Loyalita" - (Chris Brown feat. Lil Wayne & French Montana - "Loyal" x Goldroom - "Adalita")
6. "Digital Humpty" - (Digital Underground - "The Humpty Dance" x St. Vincent - "Digital Witness")
7. "RIPism" - (Young Jeezy feat. 2 Chainz - "R.I.P." x Alex Metric - "Scandalism")
8. "It's Still About Falling" - (Haim - "Falling" x Robotaki - "It's Still About You")
9. "Fetch and Roll" - (Mutt & Jeff feat. Gucci Mane - "I Rock N Roll" x Les Sins - "Fetch")
10. "Gun Galaxy" - (Chvrches - "Gun" x Alex Metric & Oliver - "Galaxy")
11. "Without Pressure" - (Queen & David Bowie - "Under Pressure" x Dillon Francis feat. Totally Enormous Extinct Dinosaurs - "Without You")
12. "The Complete Latch" - (Disclosure feat. Sam Smith - "Latch" x Blood Orange - "The Complete Knock")
13. "When Poison Starts To Burn" - (Bell Biv DeVoe - "Poison" x Disclosure - "When a Fire Starts to Burn")
14. "Cloud Party" - (Ciara - "Body Party" x Treasure Fingers - "Cloud Life")
15. "Aerosol Again" - (Major Lazer feat. Pharrell Williams - "Aerosol Can" x Röyksopp & Robyn - "Do It Again")
16. "Follow Rings" - (Lykke Li - "I Follow Rivers" x Duck Sauce - "Ring Me")
17. "Mirror Vibe" - (Kendrick Lamar - "Bitch, Don't Kill My Vibe" x Cashmere Cat - "Mirror Maru")
18. "Move That Triad" (Future feat. Pharrell Williams, Pusha T & Casino - "Move That Dope" x Rustie - "Triadzz")
19. "R U Nosetalgic" (Pusha T feat. Kendrick Lamar - "Nosetalgia" x ASTR - "RU With Me")
20. "Dance With Henrietta" (Big Sean feat. Nicki Minaj - "Dance (Ass)(Remix)" x Yeasayer - "Henrietta")
21. "Higher Greens" - (Schoolboy Q feat. Kendrick Lamar - "Collard Greens" x Just Blaze & Baauer feat. Jay Z - "Higher")
22. "Klapppit" - (Flosstradamus feat. Casino - "Mosh Pit" x Little Dragon - "Klapp Klapp")
23. "Prom Streamers" - (Chance The Rapper - "Prom Night" x Wave Racer - "Streamers")
24. "Sea It Ain't So" - (Weezer - "Say It Ain't So" x Porter Robinson - "Sea of Voices")
The Hood Internet Mixtape Volume Ten (Best of The Hood Internet 2007-2017) (2017)
1. Jay-Z x LCD Soundsystem
2. Beastie Boys x Matt & Kim
3. Big Sean x The Knocks
4. DMX x The XX
5. Eve x Radiohead
6. Arcade Fire x Blondie
7. Passion Pit x Juvenile & Mannie Fresh
8. Mayer Hawthorne x M83
9. B.O.B. x Chromeo
10. Ma$e & Kelly Price x Penguin Prison
11. Amerie x Daft Punk
12. TLC x Holy Ghost! & Michael McDonald
13. Tyga x Neon Indian
14. Modest Mouse x Kanye West
15. Genesis x Justice
16. Estelle x The Ting Tings
17. Dizzee Rascal x Cyndi Lauper
18. Justin Timberlake x Daft Punk
19. The Weeknd x Daft Punk
20. Whitney Houston x Chromeo
21. Michael Jackson x Ratatat
22. Robin S. x Holy Fuck
23. Lil Kim x MGMT
24. Bell Biv Devoe x Disclosure
25. Ciara x Treasure Fingers
26. Future x Van She & Robotaki
27. Drake x Delorean
28. Mic Terror x Green Velvet
29. Omarion x Mylo
30. Kendrick Lamar x Cashmere Cat
31. Destiny's Child x Slow Magic
32. Spank Rock x Burial
33. Soulja Boy x Digitalism
34. Big Boi x Ghislain Poirier
35. ILoveMakonnen & Drake x Penguin Prison
36. Ludacris x Joker & Ginz
37. Wiz Khalifa x Hudson Mohawke
38. Jay-Z & Kanye West x TNGHT
39. Usher x Santigold
40. R. Kelly x Broken Social Scene
41. Chance The Rapper x Keys N Krates
42. Dead Prez x Grizzly Bear
43. Notorious B.I.G. x Flume
44. Birdman & Lil Wayne x Washed Out
45. Trillville & Cutty x The Knife
46. Nelly x Jai Wolf
47. Dorrough x Bibio
48. Drake x Baauer & RL Grime
49. Mark Morrison x Ratatat
50. Dr. Dre x Class Actress
40 Years of Hip Hop (2017)
{{{2}}}

=== Productions ===
- BBU - "Please, No Pictures" from Bell Hooks (2012)
- Max B & Isaiah Toothtaker - Toothy Wavy (2012)
- Sole - "Gangster of Love" from No Wising Up No Settling Down (2013)
- Kleenex Girl Wonder - "W.S." from The Comedy Album (2016)
