= It's a Tensta Thing =

Studio album by Adam Tensta
- Released: 30 November 2007
- Genre: Hip hop, electro, house, Euro disco, pop
- Label: K-Werks

Adam Tensta chronology
It's a Tensta Thing (2007)	Scared of the Dark (2011)

Professional ratings
Review scores
Source	Rating
Dagens Nyheter	4/5 stars
Svenska Dagbladet	5/6 stars
Helsingborgs Dagblad	4/5 stars

It's a Tensta thing is Swedish rapper Adam Tensta's debut studio album, released on 30 November 2007. The album won the 2008 Hip Hop / Soul of the Year Grammis (Swedish grammy) and was nominated for a 2008 P3 Guld award.

Adam Tensta's song, "My Cool", appeared on the soundtracks for the skateboarding video game, Tony Hawk: Ride and the basketball video game, NBA 2K10.

== Track listing ==
1. "It's a Tensta Thing"
2. "Bangin' On the System"
3. "My Cool"
4. "Walk With Me"
5. "Dopeboy" (feat. Eboi)
6. "See U Watchin" (feat. Nitti Gritti)
7. "Do the Right Thing"
8. "They Wanna Know"
9. "I'm Sayin'" (feat. Isay)
10. "80's Baby"
11. "S.t.o.l.d." (feat. Eboi)
12. "Incredible" (feat. Isay)
13. "Before U Know It"
14. "Same Face"

== Singles ==
- "Before U Know It"
- "They Wanna Know"
- "My Cool"
- "Bangin' On the System"
- "Dopeboy"

== Charts ==
Chart (2007–2008)	Peak position
Swedish Albums (Sverigetopplistan)	45
