= KGW (disambiguation) =

KGW is a television station in Portland, Oregon, U.S.

KGW may also refer to:

- Kagi Airport, in Papua New Guinea; see List of airports by IATA airport code: K
- Kleenex Girl Wonder, American indie rock band
- KPOJ, radio station in Portland that broadcast as KGW from 1922 to 1991
- KKRZ, radio station in Portland that broadcast as KGW-FM from 1946 to 1950 and 1952 to 1954
- Maybrat language, Papuan language of Indonesia
- Republic-Ford JB-2, American flying bomb model
