= Psalm One =

American rapper

- Also known as: Hologram Kizzie
- Born: Cristalle Elaine Bowen; July 1, 1980 (age 46)
- Origin: Chicago, Illinois, U.S.
- Genre: Hip-hop
- Occupation: Rapper
- Years active: 2001–present
- Labels: Rhymesayers Entertainment; Bonafyde
- Website: www.psalmonelovesyou.com

Cristalle Elaine Bowen (born July 1, 1980), better known by her stage names Psalm One and Hologram Kizzie, is an American rapper from Chicago, Illinois. She has been a member of the groups Nacrobats, Rapperchicks, and Big Silky.

== Early life ==
Psalm One was born Cristalle Bowen on July 1, 1980. She grew up in Englewood, Chicago. She graduated from Whitney M. Young Magnet High School. She majored in chemistry at University of Illinois at Urbana–Champaign.

== Career ==
Psalm One released a studio album, The Death of Frequent Flyer, on Rhymesayers Entertainment in 2006. In 2010, she released Woman at Work, a series of free original compositions, through her website. After releasing a studio album, Child Support, in conjunction with America Scores and ASCAP in 2012, she ran a music education program called Rhymeschool. Under the Hologram Kizzie moniker, she released Free Hugs in 2013, and Hug Life in 2014. In 2019, she released Flight of the Wig.

== Discography ==
=== Studio albums ===
- Bio: Chemistry (2002)
- Bio: Chemistry II: Esters and Essays (2004)
- The Death of Frequent Flyer (2006)
- Woman at Work (2010)
- Woman at Work Vol. 2: 500 Bars (2010)
- Woman at Work Vol. 3 (2010)
- Child Support (2012)
- Hug Life (2014) (as Hologram Kizzie)
- Psalm One Loves You (P.O.L.Y.) (2015)
- Shitty Punk Album (2016) (with Angel Davanport, et al., as Rapperchicks)
- Gender Fender Bender (2016)
- Flight of the Wig (2019)

=== Mixtapes ===
- Get in the Van (2005)
- Get in the Van Vol. 2 (2007)
- Get in the Van Vol. 3 (2011)

=== EPs ===
- Whippersnapper (2001)
- Regular Black Girl (2012) (as Hologram Kizzie)
- Free Hugs (2013) (as Hologram Kizzie)
- Don't Get Lazy Now! (2019)
- Before They Stop Us (2020) (with Optiks)
- Big Silky Vol. 1 (2020) (with Angel Davanport, as Big Silky)
- Big Silky Vol. 2 (2020) (with Angel Davanport, as Big Silky)

=== Singles ===
- "Juke Me" (2011)
- "Need Love Too" (2013)
- "Impatient (Just U and Us)" (2015)
- "Rules and Regulations" (2016) (with Angel Davanport, et al., as Rapperchicks)
- "Where U Been Hiding?" (2019)
- "Cult of Ye" (2020) (with Optiks)
- "What I Get for Being Brilliant" (2020) (with Optiks)

=== Guest appearances ===
- Maker - "Nacrology" from Honestly (2003)
- Polyphonic the Verbose - "Out to Lunch" from Abstract Data Ark (2005)
- Casual - "Bitin' and Freakin'" from Smash Rockwell (2005)
- Copperpot - "Blow" from WYLA? (2007)
- The Ritz - "Blown" from The Night of Day (2008)
- Longshot - "How U Like It" from Addicted (2008)
- Ro Knew - "We the Ones" from High Times in Low Places (2009)
- Canibus - "Ripperland" from Melatonin Magik (2010)
- Hopie - "Retarded" from Raw Gems (2011)
- The Hood Internet - "More Fun" from FEAT (2012)
- Oh No - "Same Shit" from Disrupted Ads (2013)
- The Palmer Squares - "Nowhere to Not Go" from Planet of the Shapes (2013)
- Probcause - "Subzero" and "Whiskey on the Rocks" from The Recipe Volume 2 (2013)
- Culture Cry Wolf - "You Wanted This" from The Sapient Sessions (2013)
- Neak - "Hollywood Talk" from XIII (2013)
- CunninLynguists - "The Morning" from Strange Journey Volume Three (2014)
- Abstract Rude - "Kan of Whoop A** Reprise" from Keep the Feel: A Legacy of Hip Hop Soul (2015)
- The Palmer Squares - "Day Trippers" and "Nowhere to Not Go" from Planet of the Shapes (2016)
- Manic Focus x Psalm One - Joy in the Noise (2017)
- Mean Joe Scheme x Optiks - "Close Up" from Beams (2018)
- Time - "Seeds" from These Songs Kill Fascists (2020)
