= Bell Hooks (mixtape) =

Mixtape by BBU
- Released: February 21, 2012
- Genre: Hip-hop
- Length: 50:34
- Labels: Mishka; Mad Decent
- Producers: The Schwarz; Classick; Stefan Ponce; Tony Baines; Montana Macks; Tapez; The Hood Internet

BBU chronology
Fear of a Clear Channel Planet (2010)	Bell Hooks (2012)

Bell Hooks (often stylized as bell hooks) is the second mixtape by American hip-hop group BBU. It was released on Mishka and Mad Decent on February 21, 2012. Mixed by DJ Benzi, it features guest appearances from GLC, Mic Terror, and Das Racist. Its title derives from the pen name of feminist writer Gloria Jean Watkins. Music videos were created for "The Hood" and "Outlaw Culture", the former of which was included on Stereogum's "5 Best Videos of the Week" list.

== Critical reception ==
Professional ratings
Review scores
Source	Rating
Chicago Reader	favorable
Pitchfork	7.8/10
PopMatters	8/10 stars
Spin	7/10

Marc Hogan of Pitchfork gave the mixtape a 7.8 out of 10, praising "the way the righteous fury fuels the celebration, the truth becomes the beauty, with barely a whiff of curmudgeonly condescension." John M. Tryneski of PopMatters gave the mixtape 8 stars out of 10, calling it "one of the most arresting musical and political statements of 2012".

PopMatters placed it at number 54 on the "75 Best Albums of 2012" list. Greg Kot of Chicago Tribune placed it at number 1 on the "Top Chicago Indie Albums" list. Leor Galil of Forbes placed it at number 12 on the "Best Free Albums of 2012" list.

== Track listing ==
No.	Title	Producer(s)	Length
1.	"Wake Up Call by Malcolm London"		2:35
2.	"Outlaw Culture"	The Schwarz	4:03
3.	"The Hood" (featuring GLC)	Classick	6:25
4.	"Beau Sia"	Stefan Ponce	2:48
5.	"Mr. Goodbar (Interlude)"		0:54
6.	"Jumpers"	Tony Baines	4:29
7.	"Kurt De La Rocha"	Tony Baines	3:38
8.	"Michael Scott (Skit)"		1:26
9.	"There's Something About Mary"	Montana Macks	4:15
10.	"BBU PSA by Epic"		1:26
11.	"26th & Cali"	Montana Macks	4:03
12.	"Cormega"	Montana Macks	3:34
13.	"Spaghetti" (featuring Mic Terror)	Tony Baines	4:16
14.	"The Wrong Song"	Stefan Ponce	3:23
15.	"Tommy Bunz"	Tapez	3:33
16.	"Please, No Pictures" (featuring Das Racist)	The Hood Internet	4:25
17.	"Mr. Good Bar (Outro)"		0:55
Total length:			50:34
