= Porn and Chicken =

American music group

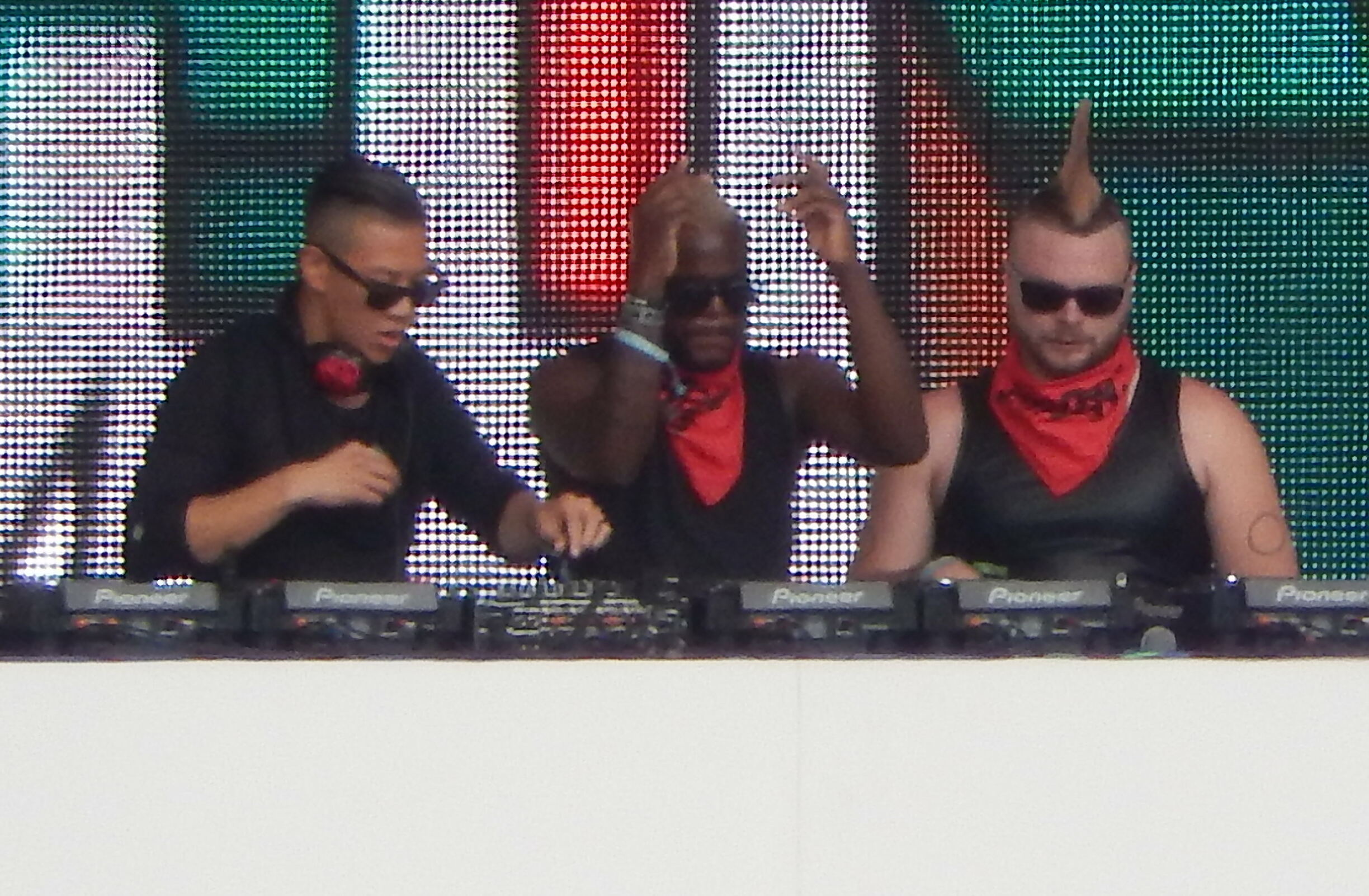
- Group at the 2014 Spring Awakening Music Festival

Background information
- Also known as: PnC; SRTB; So Ready To Bang; Beer. Porn. Chicken.
- Origin: Chicago, United States
- Genres: House; dubstep; moombahton; reggaeton; electro house
- Members: Dom Brown; Orville Kline; Fei "Phives" Tang
- Past members: Mandi; The Sleepers

Porn and Chicken is a production and DJ group consisting of Dom Brown, Orville Kline, Stevic Mac, and Ammo.

== Career ==
Porn and Chicken was originally a weekly-party event regularly at Evil Olive, a dance club in Chicago, Illinois, featuring emcee Dom Brown (founder) and resident DJs Orville Kline, PHIVES and The Sleepers. Around the year 2010, the group was started at a bar called Risque Cafe in Wrigleyville. The name Porn and Chicken, originally "Beer. Chicken. Porn.", originated from the regular activity of eating chicken and drinking beer at the bar in an erotic environment, where Brown eventually hired DJs to form the group. The bar was shut down for capacity, and Brown and his associates were fined multiple times before they moved to another bar where they were shut down again. They eventually moved to Evil Olive and became successful in creating their brand as, and transforming from a party into, artists. The original line up of Porn and Chicken consisted of Brown, Mandi, The Sleepers and Kline.

In 2012, the group collaborated with Adult Swim cartoonist Homeless Cop who made a Porn and Chicken cartoon. In 2014, Porn and Chicken released the songs, "Let it Bleed" featuring Justin Tranter of Semi Precious Weapons, and "Leap Frog" featuring Kryoman. They also remixed the Missy Elliott song "Lose Control". In 2016, they released the songs "All Hell Broke Loose" and "Snapchat That Booty Clap".
