= Help I'm Alive =

Single by Metric

from the album Fantasies
- B-side: "Help I'm a B-side"
- Released: December 23, 2008 (Canada); January 1, 2009 (US); March 16, 2009 (UK)
- Genre: Indie rock
- Length: 4:46 (album version); 3:30 (radio edit)
- Label: Last Gang
- Songwriter: Emily Haines
- Producers: Gavin Brown; John O'Mahony; James Shaw

Metric singles chronology
"Empty" (2007)	"Help I'm Alive" (2008)	"Front Row" (2009)

"Help I'm Alive" is the lead single from Canadian rock band Metric's fourth studio album Fantasies. The song was released digitally on December 23, 2008.

== Background ==
The song was written by Emily Haines and produced by John O'Mahony.

Haines said, "This song is the first of many that I wrote on the piano during my time in Buenos Aires. It started out as a ballad but really came to life once we bumped up the tempo. My favorite part of the song is the kick drum sound in the middle section, it sounds like the drums are being played in a cathedral in hell".

On November 5, 2008, Metric updated their website with a video on how Haines writes a song. The video follows Haines through Argentina on a soul searching journey to find creativity and herself. "The songs that I wrote here were the simplest and clearest writing that I've done in I think in my whole life", said Haines. "Help I'm Alive" was one of the first songs Haines had written in Buenos Aires.

On January 28, 2009, the band made the acoustic version of the single available for download from their website. The acoustic version features Emily Haines on piano and James Shaw on acoustic guitar.

This song is featured in the video game NBA 2K10, and in the credits of the video game Dying Light 2: Stay Human and was also featured on an episode of The Vampire Diaries, on an episode of One Tree Hill's seventh season, on an episode of CSI: NY's eight season, and in the second episode of 90210's third season; also on an episode in the eighth season of Grey's Anatomy and on the Amazon Prime series Carrie. The song also played over the closing credits for the 2010 movie Defendor as well as during the intro of the 2011 documentary film Miss Representation; also on the 2011 film Detention.

The song reached number 26 on Triple J's Hottest 100 of 2009.

The song was remixed by Blaqk Audio synth player and AFI guitarist Jade Puget.

It was furthermore used in 2014 on the BBC as the music on the trailer to advertise the second series of Line of Duty.

The acoustic version of the song was featured in an online video for the United Network for Organ Sharing in 2016. The video shows a heart transplant recipient carrying out his donor's "bucket list".

== Single information ==
=== Promo ===
1. "Help I'm Alive" (4:47)

=== Vinyl ===
1. "Help I'm Alive"
2. "Help I'm a B-side"

=== Free download ===
1. "Help I'm Alive" (acoustic) (4:49)

=== In the UK ===
1. "Help I'm Alive" (4:45)
2. "Sugar Mountain" (James Shaw's Neil Young cover) (5:31)

=== In the US ===
1. "Help I'm Alive" (edit) (3:27)

== Chart performance ==
The song peaked on the Canadian Hot 100 at No. 21. Downloads pushed the song onto the Hot Canadian Digital Singles chart, where it peaked at No. 18.

The song was also their first ever chart appearance in the United States, where it peaked at No. 17 on the Billboard Alternative Songs chart and No. 30 on the Rock Songs chart.

Chart (2009)	Peak position
Canadian Hot 100	21
U.S. Billboard Alternative Songs	17
U.S. Billboard Rock Songs	30

== Certifications ==
Region	Certification	Certified units/sales
Canada (Music Canada)	2× Platinum	160,000^{‡}
^{‡} Sales+streaming figures based on certification alone.

== Short film ==
On April 21, 2009, Metric released a "short film set in an imaginary landscape" with "Help I'm Alive" as the soundtrack to their official website and YouTube page. The film was directed by Deco Dawson, who also edited the band's live DVD, Live at Metropolis.

The video features clips from various performances taken from the band's December 2008 "Jingle Bell Rock" tour set to random images, which singer Emily Haines compared to "Yo Gabba Gabba! on acid".
