= The Death of Frequent Flyer =

Studio album by Psalm One
- Released: July 18, 2006
- Genre: Hip-hop
- Length: 51:07
- Label: Rhymesayers Entertainment
- Producers: Ant; Madd Crates; Maker; Overflo; Thaione Davis; Vtraxxx

Psalm One chronology
| Bio: Chemistry II: Esters and Essays (2004) | The Death of Frequent Flyer (2006) | Woman at Work (2010) |

Professional ratings
Review scores
| Source | Rating |
|---|---|
| AllMusic | 4/5 stars |
| The A.V. Club | B+ |
| Robert Christgau | (1-star Honorable Mention) |
| Cokemachineglow | 74/100% |
| HipHopDX | 3.5/5 |
| Tom Hull | B+ |
| PopMatters | 7/10 |
| RapReviews | 8.5/10 |
| Slant | 2.5/5 stars |
| Spin | 3/5 stars |

The Death of Frequent Flyer is the third studio album by American rapper Psalm One. It was released on July 18, 2006, through Rhymesayers Entertainment. Production was handled by Overflo, Thaione Davis, Ant, Madd Crates, Maker, and Vtraxxx. It features guest appearances from DJ DQ, Ang 13, Ant, Brother Ali, Kadi and Thaione Davis.

== Track listing ==
All tracks are written by Cristalle Bowen, except track 1 written with Thomas Martin and track 7 written with Jason Newman.

| No. | Title | Producer(s) | Length |
|---|---|---|---|
| 1. | "The Death of Frequent Flyer" (featuring Thaione Davis and DJ DQ) | Thaione Davis | 5:17 |
| 2. | "The Living" | Overflo | 3:11 |
| 3. | "Prelude to a Diss" (featuring Ang13) | Thaione Davis | 1:55 |
| 4. | "Rapper Girls" | Madd Crates | 3:51 |
| 5. | "The Nine" | Overflo | 3:45 |
| 6. | "Macaroni and Cheese" (featuring Ka Di) | Overflo | 4:28 |
| 7. | "Standby" (featuring Brother Ali and Ant) | Ant | 4:03 |
| 8. | "Rap Star" | Maker | 4:27 |
| 9. | "Let Me Hear" | V-Traxx | 2:30 |
| 10. | "Beat the Drum" (featuring DJ DQ) | Overflo | 3:41 |
| 11. | "Sworn Habit" | Overflo | 3:02 |
| 12. | "Mountain High" (featuring DJ DQ) | Overflo | 4:03 |
| 13. | "Peanuts" | Overflo | 3:31 |
| 14. | "Rest in Peace" | Overflo | 3:23 |
| Total length: | | | 51:07 |

== Personnel ==
- Cristalle "Psalm One" Bowen – main artist, executive producer, sleeve notes
- Thomas "Thaione Davis" Martin – featured artist (track 1), producer (tracks: 1, 3)
- Dan "DJ DQ" Hargraves – featured artist (tracks: 1, 10, 12)
- Angela "Ang 13" Zone – featured artist (track 3)
- Yolanda "KaDi" Davis – featured artist (track 6)
- Jason "Brother Ali" Newman – featured artist (track 7)
- Anthony "Ant" Davis – featured artist & producer (track 7)
- Allen "Overflo" Johnson – producer (tracks: 2, 5, 6, 10–14), management
- Alexander "Madd Crates" Rivas – producer (track 4)
- Marco "Maker" Jacobo – producer (track 8)
- Confucious – producer (track 9)
- Yoda – producer (track 9)
- Chris Gehringer – mastering
- Sean "Slug" Daley – executive producer
- Brent Sayers – executive producer
- Rodney Dugan – design, layout
- Anthony Thailor – photography
- Jason Cook – project coordinator
