= Adam Tensta =

Swedish rapper and singer

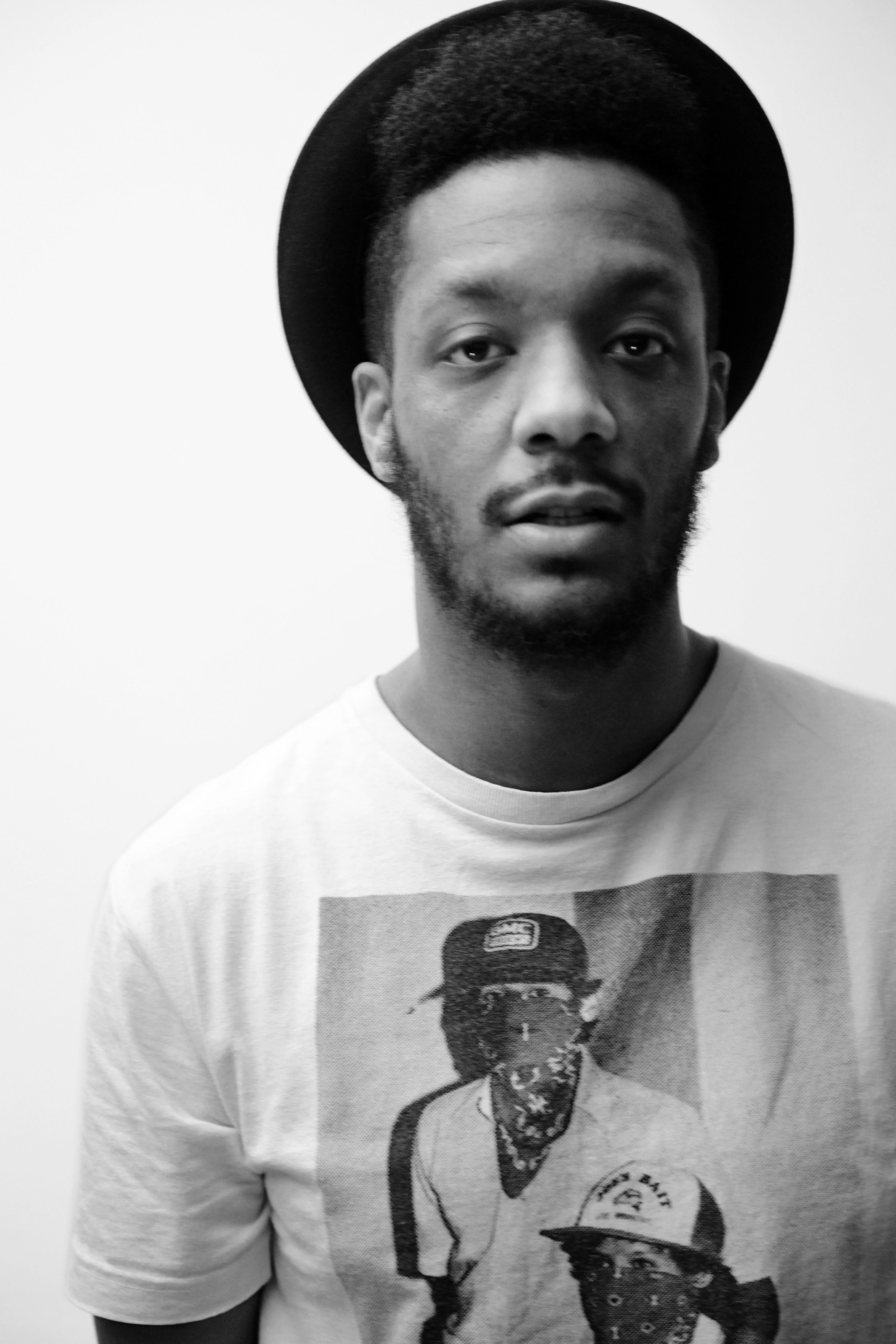

Background information
- Born: Adam Momodou Eriksson Taal; 1 August 1983 (age 43); Stockholm, Sweden
- Genre: Hip hop
- Occupations: Rapper; singer
- Label: EMI Music / RMH MGMT GRP

Adam Tensta (born Adam Momodou Eriksson Taal 1 August 1983) is a Swedish rapper and singer of Gambian descent from his father, and Finnish descent from his mother. His debut album It's a Tensta Thing was a Swedish chart topper, and was awarded the 2008 Grammis for best Dance/Hip Hop/Soul album. His song "My Cool" was featured in NBA 2K10. Adam is signed to Swedish imprint RMH, Respect My Hustle.

== Discography ==
=== Albums ===
Album cover	Album information
	It's a Tensta Thing: Released: 2007; Chart position: Certification/ Europe Sales: 10,000; Singles: 2008 "Dopeboy (Do I Look Like I Sell Drugs)"; 2008 "Before You Know It Feat. Sophia Somajo"; 2007 "My Cool"; 2007 "They Wanna Know"; 2006 "Banging on the System"

Album cover	Album information
	Scared of the Dark: Released: 17 April 2011; Singles: 2011 "Ok WOW"; 2011 "Like a Punk"; 2011 "Scared of the Dark"; 2011 "The Monkey"; 2011 "Rocket Boots; 2011 "For Last"
	The Empty: Released: 24 June 2015; Singles: 2015 "The Empty"

=== Music videos ===
Adam Tensta Videos	Featuring Adam Tensta
Bangin' On The System; My Cool; Dopeboy; They Wanna Know; Back Before You Know It	Follow Me - By Pato Pooh; Area Turns Red 09 - By Eboi & Infinite Mass; Sinner - By Addeboy vs. Cliff ft. Eboi & Adam Tensta; Huvudet - By Familjen ft. Adam Tensta
