= Showyousuck =

American rapper

- Also known as: Show You Suck
- Born: Clinton Sandifer; April 20, 1985 (age 41); Chicago, Illinois, U.S.
- Genre: Hip-hop
- Occupation: Rapper
- Years active: 2010–present
- Labels: Closed Sessions; Ruby Hornet
- Website: showyousuck.bandcamp.com

Clinton Sandifer (born April 20, 1985), better known by his stage name Showyousuck (often stylized as ShowYouSuck), is an American rapper from Chicago, Illinois. He has collaborated with Netherfriends, Mr. Muthafuckin' eXquire, and The Hood Internet. He has been a member of Treated Crew and Air Credits.

== Career ==
In 2012, Showyousuck released the Loose Slices mixtape, a collaborative EP with producer Stefan Ponce, titled Girls, Girls, Girls, and One Man Pizza Party 3: Rest in Pizza. In 2013, he released One Man Pizza Party 4: Slice After Death. In that year, he also released the Dude Bro EP. It featured contributions from P.O.S and Unstoppable Death Machines.

In 2016, Showyousuck teamed with The Hood Internet to form Air Credits, billing themselves as "music from the not too distant future, when the planet’s water supply has all but ceased, the landscape turning to desert, the desert turning to wasteland." Showyousuck and STV SLV of The Hood Internet later joined Sims of Doomtree on Sims' More Than Ever tour.

== Discography ==
=== Mixtapes ===
- One Man Pizza Party (2011)
- One Man Pizza Party 2: Mo Slices, Mo Problems (2011)
- Loose Slices (2012)
- One Man Pizza Party 3: Rest in Pizza (2012)
- One Man Pizza Party 4: Slice After Death (2013)

=== EPs ===
- Pentagrams in Bathrooms (2010)
- Girls, Girls, Girls (2012)
- Andre Findley (2013)
- Showyousuck Raps Over Toro Y Moi Songs (2013)
- Dude Bro (2013)
- Alf Fan 420 (2015)
- Extra Most Bestest Vol. 1 (2017)
- I Went into Quarantine and All I Got Was This Damn Swag Vol. 1 (2020)

=== Singles ===
- "Rap Game Karate" (2013)
- "80's Boobs" (2013)
- "Makeout King" (2013)
- "The Ring" (2014)
- "Gucci Mane" (2014)
- "Pizza $" (2014)
- "Cool" (2017)
- "Heavy Metal Love" (2018)
- "Mentally Healthy" (2018)

=== Guest appearances ===
- Isaiah Toothtaker - "Talkin Bout" from Sea Punk Funk (2012)
- Retrospect - "Abella Remix" (2012)
- Gzus Piece - "Made" from Fuck Y'all, the EP (2012)
- Mr. Muthafuckin' eXquire - "Carne Asada" from The Man in the High Castle (2012)
- Supreme Cuts & Haleek Maul - "Simon Sayz" from Chrome Lips (2012)
- The Hood Internet - "Nothing Should Be a Surprise" from FEAT (2012)
- Woof - "The Thrill of It All" from The Thrill of It All (2013)
- Oreo Jones x DMA - "Dukes of Zimbabwe" from Highway Hypnosis (2013)
- Retrospect - "Can I" from The Breakout: Part One (2013)
- Ultrademon - "Automatic" (2013)
- Mishka & Rad Reef - "Hyperbolic Chamber Music II" (2013)
- Nick Catchdubs - "Drop" from Smoke Machine (2015)
- Celine Neon - "Plz Party (Remix)" (2015)
- Ultra Suede - "Diamonds" from Ultra Suede (2018)
