= House of Baasa =

Studio album by Zambri
- Released: April 10, 2012
- Genre: Rock
- Length: 43:11
- Label: Kanine

Professional ratings
Aggregate scores
Source	Rating
Metacritic	77/100
Review scores
Source	Rating
AllMusic	3.5/5 stars

House of Baasa is the debut studio album by American duo Zambri. It was released in April 2012 under Kanine Records.

== Track listing ==
No.	Title	Length
1.	"All You Maybes"	3:55
2.	"ICBYS"	4:51
3.	"Carry"	3:30
4.	"Hundred Hearts"	5:33
5.	"Straws"	3:48
6.	"Places"	3:49
7.	"My Could Have True"	3:11
8.	"From an Angle"	4:24
9.	"From the Starts"	4:31
10.	"You'll Never Beat Dogs"
11.	Untitled	5:39
