= Homeless Cop =

American painter

- Born: Jason Fennell; St. Louis, Missouri, U.S.
- Occupation: Artist
- Website: homelesscop.com

Homeless Cop (born Jason Fennell) is an American artist known for his oil paintings, T-shirt designs, and various projects and animated bumps for Cartoon Network's Adult Swim comedy block. Currently the artist is producing paintings for his collection to be displayed at gallery shows and also working on commissioned pieces for clients.

== Adult Swim ==
Homeless Cop's work can be found in between TV programming on Turner Broadcasting's Adult Swim network in the form of 10-second commercial bumps. There are 12 commercial bumps, co-produced by Chicago web agency Doejo. In December 2010, Homeless Cop was commissioned by Adult Swim to do 12-foot-tall multi-state promotional murals.

=== Design Bureau ===
In April 2012 Homeless Cop was interviewed by Design Bureau magazine about his artwork. Later that year in October he was asked to design the back page of Design Bureau's 2nd Anniversary Issue.

=== The Studio Interview ===
In July 2012 Homeless Cop was interviewed by artist Bred Rohloff for The Studio. The feature focused on his art and musical projects.

=== LTM ===
August 2012, Homeless Cop is interviewed by Tony Batchelor for Life Tech Music online magazine.

=== Doodlers Anonymous ===
October 2013 Homeless Cop is interviewed about his artwork and submits a hand drawn illustration for Doodlers Anonymous

=== Sky Blue Window ===
Sky Blue Window interviews Homeless Cop about his artwork and connections to the Indiana music scene.

=== Wife Patrol ===
In March 2014 Homeless Cop and friend Tony Batchelor form the art and fashion company, Wife Patrol.
