= MillionYoung =

American record producer

Millionyoung (sometimes stylized as MillionYoung) is the pseudonym of Florida-based indie/electronica producer Mike Diaz. Described as chillwave, Millionyoung's sound includes electronic and sampled elements coupled with vocals from Diaz.

== Discography ==
=== Studio albums ===
Year	Album details
2011	Replicants: Released: February 2011; Label: Old Flame Records, Crash Symbols; Formats: MP3, CD, LP
2012	Amanecer: Released: July 2012; Label: Old Flame Records; Formats: MP3, CD
2013	Variable: Released: February 2013; Label: Old Flame Records; Formats: MP3
2018	Rare Form: Released: April 2018; Label: Mishu Records; Formats: MP3
2023	Ocean View: Released: September 2023; Label: Pet Tapes; Formats: MP3, LP

=== Extended plays ===
Year	EP details
2009	Sunndreamm: Released: October 2009; Label: Arcade Sound Ltd.; Formats: MP3
2010	Be So True: Released: March 2010; Label: Arcade Sound Ltd.; Formats: MP3
2011	Perfect Eyes: Released: 2011; Label: Old Flame Records; Formats: 7"
2014	Materia: Released: July 2014; Label: Old Flame Records; Formats: MP3
2021	Moments: Released: April 2021; Label: Pet Tapes; Formats: Cassette
