= NBA 2K10 =

2009 basketball video game

- American cover art featuring Kobe Bryant
- Developer: Visual Concepts
- Publisher: 2K
- Series: NBA 2K
- Platforms: Microsoft Windows; PlayStation 2 PlayStation 3 PlayStation Portable; Xbox 360; Wii
- Release: PS2, PS3, Xbox 360, PSP: NA: October 6, 2009; EU: October 6, 2009; AU: October 7, 2009; JP: October 15, 2009; Windows: EU: October 12, 2009; NA: October 12, 2009; AU: October 12, 2009; Wii: AU: October 9, 2009; NA: November 9, 2009; EU: November 27, 2009
- Genre: Sports
- Modes: Single-player, multiplayer

NBA 2K10 is a 2009 basketball video game developed by Visual Concepts and published by 2K. It was released in October and November 2009 for Microsoft Windows, PlayStation 2, PlayStation 3, PlayStation Portable, Xbox 360, and Wii. As the eleventh installment in the NBA 2K series, it is the successor to NBA 2K9 and the predecessor to NBA 2K11. Kobe Bryant of the Los Angeles Lakers is the cover athlete of the game. NBA 2K10 is the first game in the series to be released for the PlayStation Portable and Nintendo Wii platforms; it is also the first game in the series to be released on a Nintendo console since NBA 2K3 was released for the GameCube in 2002. The game is NBA 2K's last 2000s entry.

The game strives to realistically depict the experience of basketball, and more specifically, the National Basketball Association. Players mainly play NBA basketball games in a variety of game modes with real players and teams as well as customizable players. MyPlayer mode is one of the new features; in it, players create their own player and play through their career in the NBA. A mode called Association is also present, in which the player assumes control of an NBA organization, and simulates through seasons. Online modes and quick play options among others are also available.

In addition to the regular edition of the game, a limited edition, known as the Anniversary Edition, was also released; it included several bonuses, such as a poster and figurine. Only 30,000 copies of the Anniversary Edition were manufactured. A downloadable title available for PlayStation Network and Xbox Live, called NBA 2K10 Draft Combine, was released prior to the release of the main game; it tied into the main game's MyPlayer mode.

NBA 2K10 received favorable reviews from critics upon release. Positive comments were directed at the overall gameplay and presentation, as well as the introduction of the MyPlayer mode, while negative comments were concerning the presence of numerous technical issues. By February 2010, the game had sold over two million copies worldwide.

== Gameplay ==
NBA 2K10 is a basketball simulation game which strives to emulate the National Basketball Association. Players mostly play NBA basketball games with real or created players and teams. The game features several aesthetical details found in real televised NBA games, such as commentary from Kevin Harlan and Clark Kellogg, sideline reports from Cheryl Miller (This was the last game in which she was the sideline reporter instead of Doris Burke), halftime shows, replays, customizable camera angles, and other things.

Several game modes are present, such as quick play, online, and street basketball modes. Association mode allows the player to assume control of an entire NBA organization, simulating through NBA seasons, managing personnel, and participating in off-season activities. MyPlayer mode is a new mode, in which the player creates their own basketball player. The player customizes the appearance, animations, and other aspects of the player, and plays through their basketball career, upgrading their attributes. The player will play in the Summer League and D-League before making an NBA team.

== Development and release ==
NBA 2K10 was released in October and November 2009 for Microsoft Windows, PlayStation 2, PlayStation 3, PlayStation Portable, Xbox 360, and Nintendo Wii. It was developed by Visual Concepts and published by 2K Sports, a subsidiary of Take-Two Interactive. NBA 2K10 features a soundtrack consisting of 30 licensed songs. Some of the musicians are playable in the game's street basketball mode. Kobe Bryant of the Los Angeles Lakers is the cover athlete of the game. Fans were able to vote for which of four images they thought should be the image used on the cover.

In addition to the standard edition, a limited edition of the game, titled NBA 2K10: Anniversary Edition, was available for purchase. It was packaged in a specially designed locker, configured for game storage, and included a Kobe Bryant figurine made by McFarlane Toys, a poster of Bryant, and a commemorative video analyzing the history of the NBA 2K franchise. Just 30,000 copies of the Legendary Edition were manufactured, and each locker was individually numbered.

A demo of sorts was released prior to the main game's release: NBA 2K10 Draft Combine is a downloadable game for the PlayStation Network and Xbox Live platforms. It was released on August 26, 2009, for Xbox Live, and on September 3, 2009, for PlayStation Network. The game allows users to create a player and let that player complete drills and games in a pre-NBA draft camp to increase their draft stock. Players are then able to use their created player in the main game's MyPlayer mode. Derrick Rose serves as the cover athlete for NBA 2K10 Draft Combine.

== Soundtrack ==
- The Game - Champion
- Ace Hood - Top of the World
- Chali 2na - International ft. Beenie Man
- Chali 2na - Lock It Down (Instrumental)
- Flo Rida - R.O.O.T.S.
- Kanye West - Amazing ft. Young Jeezy
- Matisyahu - One Day
- MGMT - Electric Feel
- Saul Williams - List of Demands (Reparations)
- The Moog - Joyclad Armies
- Vincent Van Go Go - Do You Know
- K'naan - Wavin' Flag
- Adam Tensta - My Cool
- Akala - The Edge
- Al Kapone - Rock This
- Donnie Bravo - Run Away
- Duo Live - Shootin'
- Iglu & Hartly - In This City
- Illinois - Hang On
- Izza Kizza - They're Everywhere
- Kenan Bell - Like This
- Metric - Help I'm Alive
- Metronomy - Radio Ladio
- Miike Snow - Black & Blue
- Naive New Beaters - Can't Choose
- Sportsrushaz - Iron
- Ratatat - Falcon Jab
- Ratatat - Mirando
- Eric B. & Rakim - Don't Sweat The Technique (Commercial only)

== Reception ==
Reception

Aggregate score
| Aggregator | Score |
|---|---|
| Metacritic | (PC) 85/100 (PS3) 83/100 (X360) 82/100 |

Review scores
| Publication | Score |
|---|---|
| 1Up.com | B− |
| Game Informer | 8.25/10 |
| GameSpot | 7/10 |
| GamesRadar+ | (X360/PS3) 4/5 (PSP) 3.5/5 |
| IGN | (X360/PS3) 8.5/10 (PS2) 6.5/10 |

According to the review aggregation website Metacritic, the Microsoft Windows, PlayStation 3, and Xbox 360 versions of NBA 2K10 all received "generally favorable" reviews from critics upon release. All other versions of the game do not hold an aggregated score on the website, due to a lack of reviews.

1UP.com's Aaron Thomas called NBA 2K10 an "excellent basketball game" that is "full of nagging technical problems". The main technical issues Thomas experienced involved the game's framerate and online stability; he was also frustrated by some specific gameplay actions, such as referees taking too long to inbound the ball and frequent three-second violations. Thomas mainly praised the overall gameplay and presentation, but he also commended the addition of the MyPlayer mode, despite him thinking that progression in the mode was far too time-consuming.

Matt Bertz of Game Informer gave the game a positive review, praising the improvements made over NBA 2K9. Specifically, Bertz praised the addition of the MyPlayer mode, the Association mode, the realistic nature and focus of the game, the overall gameplay and visuals, and the commentary.

Tom Mc Shea from GameSpot cited the online options as a positive, calling them a "blast" to play, as well as the rewarding progression when playing through the MyPlayer mode. He did experience "lots of little" technical problems, however, and felt that because of the game's up upbeat tempo, which he did like, it was far to easy to score, thus eliminating strategy.

In his review for GamesRadar, Martin Kitts commended the depth, gameplay, and presentation, saying that NBA 2K10 "almost perfectly" replicates the look of a televised NBA game, even if the visuals aren't quite as good as NBA Live 10. IGN concluded its review with: "With solid, fast paced gameplay and an excellent presentation that's easily the best the series has ever had, NBA 2K10 continues its strong pedigree of great basketball. While the presentation holds down the fort, the inclusion of the NBA Today and My Player modes, as well as the addition of the developmental leagues make an already good title even better. While the technical issues, such as the slowdown and the legacy problems with the AI and shooting are dismaying, they don't completely destroy the on-court experience, which is still strong enough to allow 2K to hold the basketball crown for yet another year."

During the 13th Annual Interactive Achievement Awards, the Academy of Interactive Arts & Sciences nominated NBA 2K10 for "Sports Game of the Year".

By February 2010, 2K Sports announced that the game had sold more than two million copies across all platforms worldwide, an increase over NBA 2K9's sales numbers through that same period of time.
