= BBU (band) =

Hip-hop group from Chicago

- Origin: Chicago, Illinois, U.S.
- Genre: Hip-hop
- Years active: 2007–present
- Labels: Ruby Hornet, Mishka, Mad Decent
- Members: Jasson Perez; Richard "Epic" Wallace; Michael "Illekt" Milam

BBU is an American hip-hop group from Chicago, Illinois. It consists of Jasson Perez, Richard "Epic" Wallace, and Michael "Illekt" Milam. The group's name is an acronym for "Bin Laden Blowin' Up" and "Black, Brown and Ugly".

== Career ==
BBU's 2009 song, "Chi Don't Dance", was listed by Pitchfork as "Best New Track". In 2010, the group released a mixtape, Fear of a Clear Channel Planet.

In 2012, BBU released a mixtape, Bell Hooks, on Mishka and Mad Decent. It featured guest appearances from GLC, Mic Terror, and Das Racist. It received favorable reviews from Pitchfork, Chicago Reader, PopMatters, and Chicago Tribune. In 2012, the group was featured on The Hood Internet's "Won't Fuck Us Over" off of their album, FEAT.

PopMatters included the group on the "Best Hopes to Break Out in 2013" list, as well as the "Best Hopes to Break Out in 2015" list.

== Style and influences ==
According to Chicago Reader, BBU's most obvious inspirations are Outkast and Dead Prez.

== Discography ==
=== Mixtapes ===
- Fear of a Clear Channel Planet (2010)
- Bell Hooks (2012)

=== Guest appearances ===
- The Hood Internet - "Won't Fuck Us Over" from FEAT (2012)
