= Kenan Bell =

American rapper

- Years active: 2008–present

Kenan Bell is an independent hip hop artist and teacher from Los Angeles, CA. Kenan Bell's production team includes himself, Jason Burkhart and Jon Siebels. Kenan Bell is associated with Jon Siebels's Sonata Contata record label, having releases there.

In 2012 he became one of Vans's "Vans Custom Culture Ambassadors" with Cisco Adler and The Hold Steady.

== Releases ==
A 2009 single “Good Day” included B-side “T.G.I.F.” featuring West Coast pioneer Aceyalone, who has performed the track with Kenan Bell on occasion, included an appearance at SXSW.

A 2009 mixtape, "Good News The Mixtape" featured remixes of artists such as Pink Floyd, Duran Duran and Neil Diamond.

Bell's 2010 single "Like This" was featured in the NBA 2K10 video game.

His full length debut, “Until the Future” was released on March 30, 2010. The record included vocal contributions from Martha Davis, vocalist of new wave band, The Motels.

Fall of 2010 saw the release of "Hip Hop R.I.P" a mixtape built on the beats of fallen stars (Gangstarr, Run DMC among others) said to be "breathing new life into these gems of hip hop history"

His "Planes, Trains And Automobiles" EP was released in December 2010, followed by "31 Flavors" in January 2011, a release comprising 31 songs, one for each day of the month. Later in 2011 he released the 3 volume mixtape, "Summer Solstice", a seasonal celebration.

After going several years with no new releases, Bell returned in 2018 with three EPs under the umbrella title The Greater Good. Since then he has regularly put out singles, as well as the 2020 EP Cellular Theory.

== Live Band, Performances & Touring ==
In 2009 Kenan Bell was an opening act on De La Soul's 20th anniversary tour for 3 Feet High & Rising. That year also saw other shows with Prince Paul and Del the Funky Homosapien.

2010 saw a tour with RJD2.

In 2011 Kenan Bell was a part of Vibe's "Respect The West" show at SXSW with Snoop Dogg, Kurupt & Warren G. They also played the 2011 edition of the Eagle Rock Music Festival.
