= Zambri =

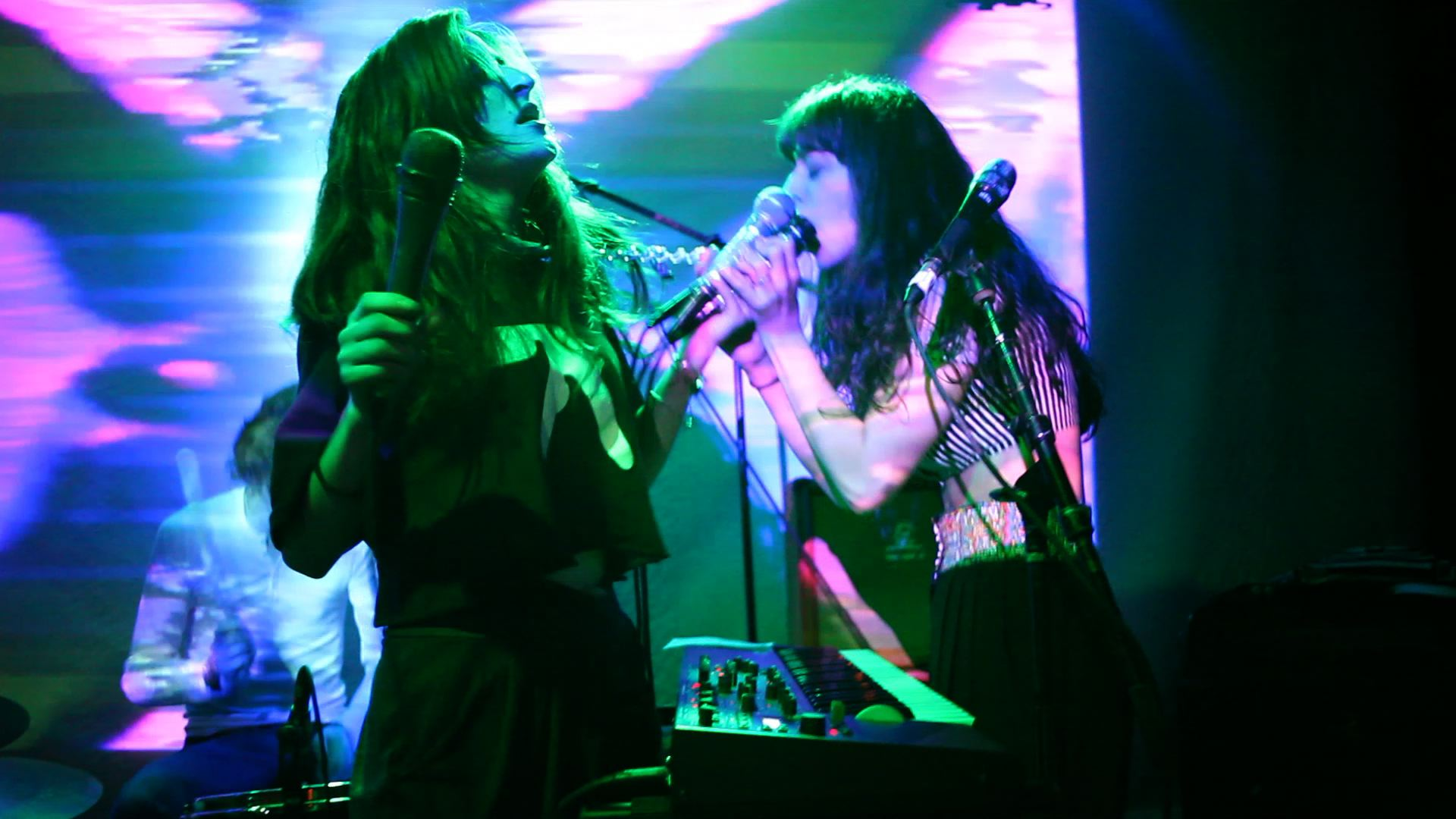
- Zambri performing live at Pianos in New York City, April 2011

Background information
- Origin: New York, NY, United States
- Genres: experimental pop, alternative, electronic
- Years active: 2008–present
- Members: Cristi Jo Zambri, Jessica Zambri, Seth Kasper, Will Spitz
- Website: zambri.net

Zambri is the New York City based experimental music project of sisters Cristi Jo and Jessica Zambri. The duo write and produce the entirety of recorded material. Drummer Seth Kasper and multi-instrumentalist Will Spitz complete the group's live lineup.

Zambri's first live show in its current lineup occurred on September 12, 2010 at Glasslands Gallery in Brooklyn, NY. Many positive live reviews circulated shortly after the band's first performances in New York City and Brooklyn. Cristi Jo and Jessica toured south to Austin, TX in March, 2011 to perform several shows as featured vocalists with Hooray For Earth at Austin's yearly SXSW Festival.

The group have released a handful of internet downloads, notably a collaboration with Bear In Heaven's Jon Philpot on the song "Carry". Additionally, the sisters have released several remixes of other artists' work, including tracks by Denmark's Oh No Ono and Grammy Award-winning group Arcade Fire.

In December 2009, FACT Magazine featured a download of "From The Starts".

Cristi Jo and Jessica have been frequently featured online wearing clothing by New York fashion designer SENA.

Alan Yaspan of Brooklyn-based Popgun Booking says: "The intense noisy progressive pop created by Zambri is as shimmering as it is foreboding. They have addictive, approachable melodies as well as perplexing production and complex song constructions that reward the listener's curiosity. The 80’s are strong with this female duet, as hints of The Cure, Kate Bush, and Giorgio Moroder often noticeable, yet Zambri’s ambition and use of sonic wizardry put them amongst the most forward thinking artists in New York City".

In Nov 2011, Kanine Records released the sisters' debut EP of self-produced material, Glossolalia. Kanine calls it "a first introduction into the world of Cristi Jo & Jessica Zambri". Zambri says about the EP: "It’s really the first time, besides being in fifth grade, we’re putting music out together."

Following the release of Glossolalia, popular music site Stereogum featured Zambri as their "Band To Watch" in November.

Glossolalia EP produced two music videos, "On Call" and "To Keep Back".

Debut full-length House Of Baasa was announced in early 2012 with three singles, "ICBYS", "Places" and "Hundred Hearts", released in anticipation of the album. SPIN Magazine premiered an "ICBYS" music video.

The group was well received at 2012's SXSW Festival in Austin, TX making appearances at several events including those hosted by SPIN, Under The Radar, Stereogum and Buzz Media.

Kanine Records released House Of Baasa on April 10, 2012. VICE-run music site Noisey hosted a stream of the record on their site the day before release.
