= Yea Big + Kid Static =

Hip-hop duo based in the United States

- Origin: Chicago, Illinois, United States
- Genres: Hip hop
- Years active: 2005–2014
- Labels: Jib Door, Metal Postcard, FMSMPRC, Team Shi
- Members: Stefen Robinson; Moses Harris, Jr.

Yea Big + Kid Static s a hip-hop duo formerly based out of Chicago, Illinois. The group's two members, Stefen Robinson and Moses Harris, Jr., worked together from 2005 to 2014.

== Group ==
The duo of Yea Big + Kid Static was formed in late 2005 by Stefen Robinson (Yea Big) and Moses Harris, Jr. (Kid Static). Their work is a blend of sample-based experimental hip-hop, D.I.Y. punk, and roots music. Yea Big + Kid Static has toured with bands as diverse as The Mae Shi, Rapider Than Horsepower, Bark Bark Bark and Gentleman Auction House; and released a digital-only side project, "Secretary", with Brad Breeck (of The Mae Shi) and Andrea Cochran. The group is not active as of January 2014.

== Kid Static ==
Moses Harris Jr., or "Kid Static", lives in Los Angeles, California as of 2014. He is focused on recording (including solo material), and performing with Open Mike Eagle.

== Yea Big ==
Stefen Robinson, or "Yea Big," currently spends most of his time working with a community education project, the "Common Action Free School," and participating in other community work and activism. Robinson grew up in Kankakee, Illinois, lived for several years in Chicago, and currently resides in Bloomington, Illinois.

Yea Big has recorded and released several full-length recordings and EP's, both solo and with his main collaborator, Kid Static. In June 2012, Yea Big signed with the record label, Illegal Art, and on October 16, 2012, released his second solo full-length, The Wind That Blows the Dandelion's Seeds.

Robinson's work is influenced by his interests regarding private and intellectual property, fair use, democratic education, social change, capitalism, pacifism, and the principles of Social Anarchism.

== Discography ==
=== The Heavy 7" (2006) ===
1. "Heavy Catamaran"
2. "Steady Syringe"
3. "Powerful Jones"
4. "Mind of Your Own"

=== Static-er Than Horsepower (2007) ===
1. "Repairs and Drums"
2. "From Bloomington to Chicago"
3. "C'mon Mother Fuckers"
4. "Powerful Ego"
5. "Heavy Poverty"
6. "I'm Having the Time of My Life"

=== HLLLYEA (2007) ===
1. "HLLLYEA"
2. "Run to the Facts"
3. "Party Steady"
4. "Boys Have to Change, Pete."
5. "PWND Control"

=== Yea Big + Kid Static (2007) ===
1. "The Screaming Starts at Sundown"
2. "We've Built A Time Machine That Runs on Beats. We Shall Only Use It for Good."
3. "Static Leads the Coup"
4. "Transmission Ended"
5. "Joining Forces"
6. "Speak the Facts"
7. "Low Budget Battle Scene"
8. "The Basement, Enfant Terrible"
9. "On the Blink"
10. "Repairs are Needed"
11. "Duck, Mother Fuckers"
12. "Revel in the Aftermath"
13. "The Life Here"
14. "Things Have To Change, Pete."
15. "Why the Fuck Does This Keep Happening"
16. "Back Into the Sleeve"

=== Eatchyo Samwich 3" Single (2008) ===
1. "Eatchyo Samwich

=== The Future's Looking Grim (2009) ===
1. "Grim"
2. "Stomp The Pedal"
3. "The Nameless"
4. "Bots"
5. "Down to the River"
6. "Middle America"
7. "Long Night"
8. "Dollar Bill Hat"
9. "Rock Bottom Rock"
10. "Eatchyo Samwich"
11. "Off a Fraction"

=== The Future's Looking Grim, Audio Commentary (2009) ===
1. "Grim"
2. "Stomp the Pedal"
3. "The Nameless"
4. "Bots"
5. "Down to the River"
6. "Middle America"
7. "Long Night"
8. "Dollar Bill Hat"
9. "Rock Bottom Rock"
10. "Eatchyo Samwich"
11. "Off a Fraction"
12. "Extra Talking, Trivia And Cracking On Bruce"

== Yea Big solo discography ==
=== The Wind That Blows The Robot's Arms (2005) ===
1. "The Wind That Blows The Robot's Arms"
2. "Please Die, And Leave Me Alone"
3. "Or Just Leave Me Alone"
4. "Exaggeration Run Amuck"
5. "My Principles Far Outweigh My Common Sense"
6. "Look For And Remove Any Foreign Objects Seen In Mouth"
7. "Manufacturing Morals"
8. "Touch You Or Touch Them"
9. "Nice People Are Those Who Have Nasty Minds"
10. "The Same Stupid Shit, Only Faster"
11. "Nice People Are Those Who Have Nasty Minds"
12. "Firstmeal"
13. "But We Will Try Nonetheless"
14. "Euphoric State Of Panic"
15. "Neurosis Of The Giver"
16. "Floccinaucinihilipilification"
17. "It Will Be Tasteful"
18. "Elegant As Fuck"
19. "Elegant As Fuck"
20. "Elegant As Fuck"
21. "Increaseth Wisdom Increaseth Sorrow"
22. "Perverse Display Of Friendship"
23. "Pleasure In Contemplating Wailing and Gnashing Of Teeth"
24. "Bruce, You Have To Recognize"
25. "You Scared Me Into Loving You"

=== The Wind That Blows The Dandelion's Seeds (2012) ===
1. "We Start With Awareness Of Our Own Ignorance"
2. "This We Must Do"
3. "What We Will"
4. "On The Material"
5. "Accumulated"
6. "What You Don't Know"
7. "Keep Aiming"
8. "Coup After Coup"
9. "A War Of Position"
10. "This Is Not A Conspiracy"
11. "We Can Push Back"
12. "My Message Is Simple"

== References and notes ==
- Pitchfork reviews
- MTV Buzzworthy
- Cyclic Defrost review by Chris Downton
- URB Next 1000
