= Kleenex Girl Wonder =

Indie rock band

Kleenex Girl Wonder (or Kleenexgirlwonder or Kleen Ex-Girl Wonder in Japan) is an indie rock band, originally from the suburbs of Chicago but now based in New York City.

The band's central and sole consistent member since its inception is Graham Smith (born July 14, 1979). The original backing band consisted of neighborhood friends from his hometown of Downers Grove, Illinois. This lineup consisted of Adam Blake (guitar), Rafeeq Hasan (bass), Quinn Goodwillie (guitar), Christian Goodwillie (bass) and Jeff Giba (drums).

The band of the past decade largely featured Smith on bass and vocals, Thayer McClanahan on guitar, and Matt LeMay on drums. Upon LeMay's departure following the completion of Vana Mundi (2018), the band brought in Adam Russin on drums to complete the current active trio.

After 2003, Smith released some albums under his own name, as well as some credited to both his given name and KGW.

All significant and currently available albums are listed in the discography below, with accreditation delineated as necessary.

== Discography ==
Album name	Year	?	Notes
Porno Movie	1994	KG0-3	
I'm Thinking Metric	1995	KG0-2	
Miss Pregnant Wetnuts	1995	KGB-69	
Old Timer Loose in Mustard Springs	1995, unreleased	KG0-1	
Sexual Harassment	1996	KG001	
Graham Smith Is the Coolest Person Alive	1997	KG002	
AGAS EP	1998	KG00333	
Ponyoak	1999	KG003	
Ponyoak Bonus EP	1999	KG00366	
Smith	2001	KG004	
Why I Write Such Good Songs EP	2002	KG0045	
After Mathematics	2002	KG005	
Final Battle	2004	KG006	as Graham Smith
CMYK	2006	KG007	4-album box set, also distilled as a single release, November Brain - these releases generally credited to Graham Smith & KGW, also sometimes as Graham Smith with Herbs or just Herbs)
Yes Boss	2008	KG008	as Graham Smith & KGW
Mrs. Equitone	2009	KG099	as KGW
Accept the Mystery	2010	KG010	as Graham Smith
Secret Thinking	2011	KG011	
Let it Buffer	2013	KG012	
The Comedy Album	2016	KG013	
Vana Mundi	2018	KG014	
White Lacuna	2018	KG015	
Let it Buffer (Forever)	2020		
Yes Boss	2021		
Mrs. Equitone	2021		
November Brain	2021		
Accept the Mystery	2021		
Losel Vila	2022		
Xi	2023		
