= Soldier On =

Soldier On may refer to:

== Organisation ==
- Soldier On, an Australian charity for wounded soldiers, Spirit of the Anzacs

== Music ==
- Soldier On, album by Tim Knol 2013
- Soldier On (EP), an EP by American musician Andrew Bird released in 2007

=== Songs ===
- "Soldier On", a song by Oasis from the album Dig Out Your Soul released in 2008
- "Soldier On", a song by the English punk rock band Dogs released in 2006
- "Soldier On" by The Temper Trap Composed by The Temper Trap covered by General Fiasco / Local Natives / The Temper Trap
- "Soldier On" by Sidewalk Prophets
- "Soldier On" by Tall Firs Composed by Aaron Mullan / Dave Mies
- "Soldier On" by Kurt Carr / Kurt Carr Singers Composed by Kurt Carr
- "Soldier On", a song from the musical A Little Princess by Andrew Lippa and Brian Crawley
- "Soldier On", a song by the Dutch rock band Di-rect released in 2020

== See also ==
- Soldier on the hill, a novel by Australian author Jackie French published in 1997
- Soldier on the Wall, an album by Alex Harvey released in 1982
