= I Want to See Pulaski at Night =

EP by Andrew Bird
- Released: November 19, 2013November 19, 2013
- Genre: Indie folk
- Label: Grimsey Records

Andrew Bird chronology
| Hands of Glory (2012) | I Want to See Pulaski at Night (2013) | Things Are Really Great Here, Sort Of... (2014) |

I Want to See Pulaski at Night is an EP by American musician Andrew Bird, released November 19, 2013.

According to Andrew Bird, the album was written to accompany the central track, saying, "I had this song 'Pulaski at Night' that was fresh and ready to go. Rather than wait a few years to put it out, I composed a sort of score to go with it, as if the song were a movie, and I wrapped it in a soundtrack composed of themes that set you up for the song. When a seemingly random word or phrase sticks in your head for two decades, you should pay attention to it and maybe honor it in some way."

Besides "Pulaski at Night," all of the other songs are instrumentals. The instrumentation in the album comes mainly from violins and loop pedals, but there is some piano and percussion accompaniment.

== Reception ==
Professional ratings
Aggregate scores
| Source | Rating |
|---|---|
| Metacritic | 64/100 |
Review scores
| Source | Rating |
| Paste | 8.5/10 |
| Pitchfork | 6.5/10 |
| Beats Per Minute | 6.7/10 |
| Consequence of Sound | C− |
| PopMatters | 5/10 |

I Want to See Pulaski at Night received generally favorable reviews, with an overall Metacritic score of 64/100. Generally, critics praised Bird for his technical skill, lyrics, and creative atmosphere, but criticized the album's similarity to previous works. PopMatters wrote that the music was, "raw, sparse, experimental, and beautiful," while simultaneously criticizing it for being stylistically too similar to previous works, and unadventurous. Similarly, Consequence of Sound remarked that, "there’s nothing on Pulaski that doesn’t harken directly to some point of Bird’s recent career."

Beyond the musical content, the album was praised for its unique structure, with the title track being surrounded on both sides by ethereal instrumentals. Pitchfork wrote that, "the most innovative and intriguing aspect of Pulaski is not its music, but ultimately its not-quite-definable form." Paste Magazine stated that "[the album] is structurally genius. Bird places the title track in the middle of the seven-song EP and frames it with an instrumental score."

== Track listing ==
| No. | Title | Length |
|---|---|---|
| 1. | "Ethio Invention no. 1" | 6:46 |
| 2. | "Lit from Underneath" | 3:15 |
| 3. | "Logan's Loop" | 1:08 |
| 4. | "Pulaski at Night" | 4:49 |
| 5. | "Hover I" | 3:28 |
| 6. | "Hover II" | 4:41 |
| 7. | "Ethio Invention no. 2" | 8:17 |

== Other appearances ==
- "Logan's Loop" and "Pulaski at Night" feature in multiple episodes of the drama television series The Young Pope
- "Pulaski at Night" features in the first episode of the second season of the TV series Orange Is the New Black
- An early version of the Ethio Inventions appears as "Ethiobirds" on Fingerlings 3
- "Lit from Underneath" was later rewritten with lyrics as "Chemical Switches" on the album Are You Serious
- A reworked version of "Pulaski at Night" appears as "Pulaski" on the deluxe edition of Are You Serious.
