= Fingerlings 2 =

Live album by Andrew Bird
- Released: 2004
- Genre: Indie rock
- Label: Grimsey

Andrew Bird chronology
Weather Systems (2003)	Fingerlings 2 (2004)	The Mysterious Production of Eggs (2005)

Professional ratings
Review scores
Source	Rating
Allmusic	4/5 stars

Fingerlings 2 is the second live album in a series of live releases by the American singer-songwriter Andrew Bird. Self-released in 2004, it features appearances by My Morning Jacket and Nora O'Connor as well as five live renditions of tracks featured on Bird's 2005 release The Mysterious Production of Eggs.

== Track listing ==
No.	Title	Length
1.	"First Song"	4:32
2.	"Skin Is, My"	4:17
3.	"Masterfade"	5:19
4.	"Banking on a Myth"	4:23
5.	"MX Missiles"	3:58
6.	"Spanish for Monsters"	3:38
7.	"Sovay"	5:17
8.	"Way Out West"	4:21
9.	"Depression Pasillo"	3:15
10.	"Happy Day"	2:47
