= MondoCon =

- Status: Active
- Genre: Films, art
- Venue: Marchesa Hall & Theater
- Location: Austin, Texas
- Country: United States
- Inaugurated: 2014
- Organizer: Mondo Tees
- Website: mondo-con.com

MondoCon is an annual celebration of the collectible artwork and artists at Mondo, a poster and T-shirt company, held in Austin, Texas, United States. It offers exclusive items, panels, exhibitor booths and screenings with filmmakers and artists.

== History ==
MondoCon was conceived as a spin-off from Fantastic Fest, with the first two years taking place on the weekends of the event, before branching out to its own weekend.

MondoCon 2014 ran September 20–21 for about 2,000 people and coincided with the first weekend of Fantastic Fest. It featured a premiere of scenes from 2001: A Space Odyssey with composer Alex North's original score re-inserted. William Stout revealed information about an unproduced Godzilla remake written by Fred Dekker that was to be directed by Steve Miner. Future Shock! The Story of 2000 AD, a documentary about the titular British comic anthology, had its world premiere. About 50 artists and designers attended, including artists Bernie Wrightson, Basil Gogos and Todd Slater. It included live screenprinting of prints by Bryan Lee O’Malley and Mike Mignola. Dogfish Head Brewery provided an exclusive "Mondo Beer" aged in oak tanks.

MondoCon 2015 was held October 3–4 and expanded its space to the Marchesa Theater and the Holiday Inn across the street and included artists such as Becky Cloonan, Francesco Francavilla and Ken Taylor. Concept artist Jock revealed he was designing Star Wars: The Last Jedi. For the first time, all three Back to the Future film scores were released together on vinyl.

MondoCon 2016 was held October 22–23 at the AFS Cinema and Holiday Inn Midtown Conference Center. It featured Florian Bertmer, Scott C., Aaron Draplin, Aaron Horkey, Jock, Olly Moss, Alex Pardee, Arik Roper, Jay Ryan, Todd Slater and William Stout. Fans started lining up 48 hours early. It included a 10th anniversary screening of The Fountain with introduction and Q&A by composer Clint Mansell and a sale of the soundtrack on vinyl for the first time. During a panel with Mondo's creative team it was revealed the company was working on a Nickelodeon-themed gallery show that would include Ren and Stimpy and The Legend of Korra.

MondoCon 2017 was announced as taking place November 4–5 in a new location, formerly the print presses of the Austin American-Statesman building, and was scheduled to feature Florian Bertmer, Becky Cloonan, Aaron Draplin, Francesco Francavilla, Jock, Mike Mitchell, Alex Pardee, Eric Powell, Jay Ryan, Todd Slater and William Stout.

In April 2018, Mondo announced the event would be taking a hiatus that year but would return on September 14-15, 2019.

== Reception ==
The event has been called "the world's coolest poster convention" and "one of the leaders in the rise of pop culture art." In 2016 Nerdist called it "the venerable kingpin of the artisanal movie poster game."
