= Thrills (Andrew Bird's Bowl of Fire album) =

Studio album by Andrew Bird's Bowl of Fire
- Released: April 7, 1998
- Length: 52:52
- Label: Rykodisc
- Producer: Mike Napolitano, Andrew Bird

Andrew Bird's Bowl of Fire chronology
Music of Hair (1996)	Thrills (1998)	Oh! The Grandeur (1999)

Professional ratings
Review scores
Source	Rating
Allmusic	4/5 stars

Thrills is the second studio album by the American singer-songwriter Andrew Bird, and his first with his band Andrew Bird's Bowl of Fire. It was released on April 7, 1998, on the Rykodisc label.

== Track listing ==
All tracks are written by Andrew Bird, except where noted.

No.	Title	Writer(s)	Length
1.	"Minor Stab"		5:27
2.	"Ides of Swing"		2:45
3.	"Glass Figurine"		3:24
4.	"Pathetique"	Lyrics adapted from the poem Ich Grolle Nicht by Heinrich Heine	4:30
5.	"Depression-Pasillo"	Garcia	3:32
6.	"50 Pieces"		3:26
7.	"A Woman's Life and Love"	Lyrics adapted from a poem by Adelbert von Chamisso	4:26
8.	"Swedish Wedding March"		2:30
9.	"Eugene"		4:14
10.	"Gris-Gris"		3:27
11.	"Cock o' the Walk"		2:54
12.	"Nuthinduan Waltz"		2:59
13.	"Some of These Days" (Hidden track "Chinatown, My Chinatown")	Charley Patton (William Jerome, Jean Schwartz)	9:17

== Other appearances ==
- A live version of "Depression-Pasillo" appears on Fingerlings 2.
- A line from the song "Eugene" ("Sure fatal doses of malcontent through osmosis") also appears in the song "Imitosis," from the album Armchair Apocrypha.
- Earlier versions of "Nuthinduan Waltz" and "Pathetique" are found on the album Music of Hair.

== Personnel ==
Musicians

- Andrew Bird - violin, vocals (1–6, 9–13), mandolin (8)
- Kevin O'Donnell - drums, washboard (9, 11), pots & pans (4)
- Joshua Hirsch - bass
- James Mathus - banjo (1, 5, 6), guitar (1–4, 7–13), piano (2, 7), trombone (4)
- Katharine Whalen - vocals (4, 7, 12)
- Jack Fine - trumpet (1)

Other persons

- Recorded and mixed by Mike Napolitano
- Mastering by Brent Lambert
- Album artwork: Audrey Niffenegger
- Photos: Dave Rosser
- Design: Steven Jurgensmeyer
