= Andrew Bird & the Mysterious Production of Eggs =

Studio album by Andrew Bird
- Released: February 8, 2005
- Genre: Baroque pop, indie folk
- Length: 53:24
- Label: Righteous Babe
- Producer: Andrew Bird, David Boucher

Andrew Bird chronology
Weather Systems (2003)	Andrew Bird & the Mysterious Production of Eggs (2005)	Armchair Apocrypha (2007)

Andrew Bird & the Mysterious Production of Eggs is the third solo studio album by the American singer-songwriter Andrew Bird, and his second album following the disbandment of Bowl of Fire. It was released on February 8, 2005, through Righteous Babe Records. The album art, along with track illustrations in the accompanying booklet were drawn by Jay Ryan. Bird expanded on his earlier work on Weather Systems; the song "Skin Is, My" is an outgrowth of his earlier song "Skin".

== Reception ==
Professional ratings
Aggregate scores
Source	Rating
Metacritic	85/100
Review scores
Source	Rating
AllMusic	4.5/5 stars
The Boston Phoenix	3/4 stars
Entertainment Weekly	B+
The Irish Times	4/5 stars
Paste	4.5/5 stars
Pitchfork	8.3/10
PopMatters	8/10
Q	3/5 stars
Uncut	4/5 stars
The Village Voice	B

"Fake Palindromes" was listed as the 331st best song of the 2000s by the music website Pitchfork. Pitchfork also placed the album at number 181 on their list of top 200 albums of the 2000s.

The album has sold 80,000 copies in the United States by November 2008.

The album was rereleased in February 2017.

== Track listing ==
No.	Title	Length
1.	"Intro"	1:05
2.	"Sovay"	4:41
3.	"A Nervous Tic Motion of the Head to the Left"	4:59
4.	"Fake Palindromes"	2:52
5.	"Measuring Cups"	2:51
6.	"Banking on a Myth"	4:28
7.	"Masterfade"	4:10
8.	"Opposite Day"	4:31
9.	"Skin Is, My"	3:36
10.	"The Naming of Things"	4:57
11.	"MX Missiles"	4:21
12.	"Opposite Day Reprise"	1:08
13.	"Tables and Chairs"	4:44
14.	"The Happy Birthday Song"	5:03

== Other appearances ==
- Tracks 3, 5, and 14 appear on Fingerlings 3.

== Personnel ==
- Andrew Bird – vocals, guitar, violin, glockenspiel, whistles
- David Boucher – production
- Kevin O'Donnell – drums, percussion, beats
- Nora O'Connor – backing vocals
- David Boucher, Dan Dietrich, Mark Greenberg, Mike Napolitano, Mark Nevers – engineering
- David Boucher – mixing
- Jim DeMain – mastering
- Jason Harvey – layout design
- Jay Ryan – artwork, drawing
