= Noble Beast =

Studio album by Andrew Bird
- Released: January 20, 2009
- Genre: Baroque pop
- Length: 54:17
- Labels: Fat Possum (US), Bella Union (UK)

Andrew Bird chronology
Soldier On EP (2007)	Noble Beast (2009)	Fingerlings 4 (2010)

Singles from Noble Beast
- 1. "Oh No" Released: 2009; 2. "Fitz and the Dizzyspells" Released: 2009

Noble Beast is the fifth solo studio album by the American singer-songwriter Andrew Bird, and his eighth overall. It was released on January 20, 2009. Two songs from this album were previewed on his webpage; "Oh No" and "Carrion Suite", while the entire album was made available by NPR as a streaming feed. Noble Beast was made available as a standard CD release, a special limited-edition deluxe two-CD package and a double-LP package.

The track "Tenuousness" appears in the closing credits for the 2011 movie Crazy, Stupid, Love.

== Reception ==
Professional ratings
Aggregate scores
Source	Rating
Metacritic	79/100
Review scores
Source	Rating
AllMusic	4/5 stars
The A.V. Club	(B+)
Drowned in Sound	(9/10)
The Guardian	5/5 stars
LA Times	3/4 stars
Paste	(6.7/10)
Pitchfork	(7.5/10)
Rolling Stone	3.5/5 stars
The Skinny	4/5 stars
Spin	(7/10)
Tiny Mix Tapes	3.5/5 discs
Uncut	4/5 stars

The album received a Metacritic score of 79 out of 100 based on 29 reviews, indicating generally favorable reviews.

The album debuted on the Billboard 200 chart at No. 12, and No. 3 on the Top Rock Albums Albums chart, selling 26,000 copies in the first week. The album has sold 150,000 copies in the United States as of December 2011.

== Track listing ==
All tracks are written by Andrew Bird, except where noted.

No.	Title	Writer(s)	Length
1.	"Oh No"		4:20
2.	"Masterswarm"		6:35
3.	"Fitz and the Dizzyspells"		3:36
4.	"Effigy"		5:06
5.	"Tenuousness"		3:51
6.	"Nomenclature"		2:54
7.	"Ouo"		0:20
8.	"Not a Robot, but a Ghost"	Bird, Martin Dosh	5:37
9.	"Unfolding Fans"	Bird, Jeremy Ylvisaker	0:57
10.	"Anonanimal"		4:47
11.	"Natural Disaster"		4:18
12.	"The Privateers"		3:24
13.	"Souverian"		7:18
14.	"On Ho"		1:08

Bonus tracks
No.	Title	Length
15.	"Section 8 City" (iTunes only bonus track)	7:41
16.	"10-you-us" (iTunes pre-order only bonus track)
17.	"Take Courage" (eMusic only bonus track)	6:51

== Other appearances ==
- "Not a Robot, But a Ghost" samples from the song "First Impossible," which appears on Dosh's album Wolves and Wishes.
- "The Privateers" uses lyrics similar to "The Confession," a song appearing on Oh! The Grandeur by Andrew Bird's Bowl of Fire.
- A different version of "Section 8 City" appears on Fingerlings 4.

== Useless Creatures (Deluxe edition bonus disc) ==
Deluxe Edition album art, used for the Noble Beast/Useless Creatures 2-CD set

The limited edition of Noble Beast shipped with a companion disc of instrumental songs, entitled Useless Creatures. This collection was made available on Bird's website in early January, before the album's release.

No.	Title	Length
1.	"Master Sigh"	2:17
2.	"You Woke Me Up!"	7:24
3.	"Nyatiti"	4:01
4.	"The Barn Tapes"	10:12
5.	"Carrion Suite"	9:39
6.	"Spinney"	0:45
7.	"Dissent"	3:54
8.	"Hot Math"	7:18
9.	"Sigh Master"	5:32

== Personnel ==
- Andrew Bird – violin, vocals, whistling, guitar
- Martin Dosh – percussion, looping, keys
- Jeremy Ylvislaker – guitar, bass, organ, shortwave
- Kelly Hogan – background vocals
- Mike Lewis – clarinet
- Todd Sickafoose – double bass
- Ben Martin – cardboard box drums
- Tony Crow – juno

== Charts ==
Chart (2009)	Peak position
Belgian Albums (Ultratop Flanders)	77
French Albums (SNEP)	62
Dutch Albums (Album Top 100)	64
US Billboard 200	12
US Digital Albums (Billboard)	2
US Independent Albums (Billboard)	1
US Top Rock Albums (Billboard)	3
US Indie Store Album Sales (Billboard)	2
