= Fingerlings 4 =

Live album by Andrew Bird
- Released: 2010
- Genre: Indie rock
- Label: Wegawam Music Co.

Andrew Bird chronology
Noble Beast (2009)	Fingerlings 4 (2010)	Break It Yourself (2012)

Fingerlings 4 is the fourth album in a series of live releases by the American singer-songwriter Andrew Bird, released in 2010. It features live recordings from the December 2009 Gezelligheid performances at 4th Presbyterian church in Chicago, IL. The album art was made by Jay Ryan.

== Track listing ==
All tracks are written by Andrew Bird, except where noted.

No.	Title	Writer(s)	Length
1.	"Dance of Death"		3:47
2.	"Master Sigh"		5:12
3.	"Make Hay"		4:18
4.	"You Woke Me Up!"		7:16
5.	"Danse Carribe"		3:32
6.	"The Barn Tapes"		6:22
7.	"The Sifters"		4:20
8.	"Carrion Suite"		6:03
9.	"Meet Me Here at Dawn"	Cass McCombs	2:45
10.	"Oh Baltimore"		3:29
11.	"Section 8 City"		7:10

== Other appearances ==
- A version of "Dance of Death" appears on the album The Ballad of the Red Shoes.
- Versions of "Danse Carribe," "The Sifters," and "Oh Baltimore" (renamed "Eyeoneye"), appear on the album Break It Yourself.
- "Carrion Suite" also appears on the bonus disc Useless Creatures, as does "You Woke Me Up!"; the latter contains added lyrics that would be reused in "Capsized" from the album Are You Serious.
- "Meet Me Here at Dawn" is a Cass McCombs cover, originally appearing on the album A.
- "Section 8 City" appears as a bonus track on Noble Beast.
