= Break It Yourself =

Studio album by Andrew Bird
- Released: March 5, 2012
- Genres: Indie rock; baroque pop
- Length: 60:20
- Labels: Mom + Pop (US); Bella Union (UK)
- Producers: Andrew Bird, David Boucher

Andrew Bird chronology
Fingerlings 4 (2010)	Break It Yourself (2012)	Hands of Glory (2012)

Singles from Break it Yourself
- 1. "Eyeoneye" Released: 2012; 2. "Desperation Breeds..." Released: 2012

Break It Yourself is the sixth solo studio album by the American singer-songwriter Andrew Bird, released on March 5, 2012, through Mom+Pop records in the US and Bella Union in the UK. The track "Lusitania" features a duet with St. Vincent.

== Critical reception ==
Professional ratings
Aggregate scores
Source	Rating
Metacritic	80/100
Review scores
Source	Rating
AllMusic	4/5 stars
The A.V. Club	(A−)
The Guardian	5/5 stars
Pitchfork	(7.5/10)
PopMatters	(5/10)
Rolling Stone	3.5/5 stars
Beats Per Minute	(79%)

The album was well received by critics: according to Metacritic, the album has received an average review score of 80/100, based on 33 reviews.

The album debuted on the Billboard 200 at No. 10, which is Bird's first top 10 entry in the chart, selling 30,000 copies in the first week.

== Track listing ==
No.	Title	Writer(s)	Length
1.	"Desperation Breeds..."		5:30
2.	"Polynation"		0:45
3.	"Danse Caribe"		5:19
4.	"Give It Away"		4:31
5.	"Eyeoneye"		4:07
6.	"Lazy Projector"		4:59
7.	"Near Death Experience Experience"		4:29
8.	"Behind the Barn"		1:04
9.	"Lusitania"	Bird, Annie Clark	4:04
10.	"Orpheo Looks Back"		4:55
11.	"Sifters"	Bird, Sharon Lanza	4:13
12.	"Fatal Shore"		5:06
13.	"Hole in the Ocean Floor"		8:18
14.	"Belles"		3:00

== Other appearances ==
- Versions of "Danse Caribe", "Eyeoneye", and "Sifters" appear on Fingerlings 4. They are titled "Danse Carribe", "Oh Baltimore", and "The Sifters" respectively.
- A slower version of "Orpheo Looks Back" (called "Orpheo") appears on Hands of Glory.

== Personnel ==
Band

- Andrew Bird – violin, guitar, vocals, whistling
- Martin Dosh – drums
- Jeremy Ylvisaker – guitar, keyboards, background vocals
- Mike Lewis – bass, tenor saxophone, background vocals

Additional musicians

- J. T. Bates – drums on "Danse Caribe"
- Annie Clark (St. Vincent) – vocals on "Lusitania", courtesy of 4AD
- Nora O'Connor – vocal harmonies on "Give It Away", "Lazy Projector", "Near Death Experience Experience", "Fatal Shore"
- Simone White – vocal harmony on "Desperation Breeds"
- Wendy Lewis – cooking, moral support

== Charts ==
Chart (2012)	Peak position
Belgian Albums (Ultratop Flanders)	84
French Albums (SNEP)	137
Dutch Albums (Album Top 100)	79
Spanish Albums (Promusicae)	63
UK Albums (Official Charts)	100
US Billboard 200	10
US Americana/Folk Albums (Billboard)	1
US Independent Albums (Billboard)	1
US Top Rock Albums (Billboard)	3
US Indie Store Album Sales (Billboard)	3
US Vinyl Albums (Billboard)	2
