= Hark! (Andrew Bird album) =

Studio album by Andrew Bird
- Released: October 30, 2020
- Genre: Christmas music
- Length: 43:56
- Label: Loma Vista
- Producer: Andrew Bird

Andrew Bird chronology
My Finest Work Yet (2019)	Hark! (2020)	Inside Problems (2022)

Hark! is the 13th solo studio album by Andrew Bird, released on December 11, 2020. It is Bird's first full-length holiday-themed release.

Six songs from the album initially appeared on an EP, also titled Hark!, which was released digitally in November 2019.

== Reception ==
Professional ratings
Review scores
Source	Rating
AllMusic	3.5/5 stars
Beats Per Minute	70/100
Spectrum Culture	3/5 stars
Sputnikmusic	4.5/5 stars

Andrea Warner of CBC Music praised Bird's cover of Vince Guaraldi's "Skating" from A Charlie Brown Christmas, stating "Bird's innovative and creative cover...is both familiar and jolting, warm and angular, evoking the joy of spinning circles on a frozen lake as the wind gently cuts paths across your cheeks."

== Track listing ==
All tracks are written by Andrew Bird except where noted.

No.	Title	Writer(s)	Length
1.	"Andalucia"	John Cale	3:32
2.	"Alabaster"		3:12
3.	"Greenwine"	Andrew Bird; Brett Sparks; Rennie Sparks	3:48
4.	"Christmas In April"		3:31
5.	"Souvenirs"	John Prine	3:29
6.	"Oh Holy Night"	Adolphe Adam	2:17
7.	"Mille Cherubini in Coro"	Franz Schubert	1:49
8.	"Night's Falling"		3:30
9.	"Glad"	Alan Hampton	3:58
10.	"Christmas Is Coming"	Vince Guaraldi	3:21
11.	"White Christmas"	Irving Berlin	3:14
12.	"Skating"	Vince Guaraldi	3:35
13.	"Auld Lang Syne"	Robert Burns	4:33
