= Die Young Stay Pretty =

Die Young Stay Pretty may refer to:

- Die Young: Stay Pretty, a 2008 album by The Thought Criminals
- "Die Young, Stay Pretty", a song by Blondie from the 1979 album Eat to the Beat
- "Die Young Stay Pretty", a song by Short Stack from the 2010 album This Is Bat Country

== See also ==
- Died Young Stayed Pretty, a 2008 documentary film
