= My Finest Work Yet =

Studio album by Andrew Bird
- Released: March 22, 2019
- Studios: Barefoot Studios (Los Angeles); Sound City Studios (Los Angeles); Dreamland (Hurley, New York)
- Genres: Indie rock, indie folk
- Length: 45:08
- Label: Loma Vista
- Producers: Andrew Bird; Paul Butler

Andrew Bird chronology
Echolocations: River (2017)	My Finest Work Yet (2019)	Hark! (2020)

Singles from My Finest Work Yet
- 1. "Bloodless" Released: November 2, 2018; 2. "Sisyphus" Released: January 30, 2019; 3. "Manifest" Released: March 5, 2019

My Finest Work Yet is the twelfth solo studio album by Andrew Bird, released on March 22, 2019. It is notable for being Andrew Bird's first overtly political album, covering topics such as divisive political atmosphere, climate change, and apathy.

== Background ==
"Bloodless," which was released as the first single, was written between the 2016 election and Charlottesville. "I was trying to figure out a way to step back and look at everything that's going on," Bird said, "and look at how we're caught in this sort of death spiral." The album title, similar to previous album Are You Serious, was originally a working title and an inside joke. When asked if it truly was his "finest work yet," Bird responded, "At some point, all of them are."

The album cover was photographed by creative director Amanda Demme. It is a recreation of the 1793 painting The Death of Marat by Jacques-Louis David, which depicts Jean-Paul Marat, a journalist and revolutionary who was assassinated during the height of the French Revolution. The painting was originally chosen so that its dramatic nature ("the suffering poet on his deathbed penning his last words with his dying breath") would enhance the humorous tongue-in-cheek title of the album. Upon further research, however, Bird found that the painting's historical significance lined up with the political tone of the album.

== Recording ==
The album was recorded with the full band playing together in the studio, allowing the sound of instruments to 'bleed' together on different channels, "against the trend of the last 30 to 40 years, which is to isolate every sound and manipulate it [later] in the mix."

== Release ==
Bird released the single "Bloodless" on November 2, 2018. The album was officially announced on January 30, 2019, with the album's second single "Sisyphus" released the same day. A third single, "Manifest", was released on March 5, 2019. My Finest Work Yet was released on March 22, 2019, through Loma Vista Recordings.

== Critical reception ==
Professional ratings
Aggregate scores
Source	Rating
AnyDecentMusic?	7.6/10
Metacritic	80/100
Review scores
Source	Rating
AllMusic	4/5 stars
The A.V. Club	A−
Consequence of Sound	B
Exclaim!	8/10
Mojo	3/5 stars
musicOMH	4/5 stars
Pitchfork	7.6/10
Q	4/5 stars
Sputnikmusic	4.3/5
Uncut	7/10

My Finest Work Yet received favorable reviews from music critics. At Metacritic, which assigns a normalized rating out of 100 to reviews from professional publications, the album received an average score of 80, based on 14 reviews. Aggregator AnyDecentMusic? gave it 7.6 out of 10, based on their assessment of the critical consensus.

Mark Deming of AllMusic called the album "passionate, beautifully crafted indie rock with an artful undercurrent of folk, and Bird has rarely been as consistently in strong form as a vocalist. Bird and his studio band deliver performances that are dynamic and evocative while sounding fresh and uncluttered, and as usual, his guitar and violin work (as well as his whistling) are first-rate. Bird isn't afraid of melodrama or broad gestures, yet his emotional force is carefully focused and purposeful in these sessions, and this work speaks to the heart as well as the intellect."

== Track listing ==
All tracks are written by Andrew Bird.

No.	Title	Length
1.	"Sisyphus"	4:06
2.	"Bloodless"	6:29
3.	"Olympians"	4:00
4.	"Cracking Codes"	3:12
5.	"Fallorun"	4:26
6.	"Archipelago"	4:38
7.	"Proxy War"	4:05
8.	"Manifest"	5:17
9.	"Don The Struggle"	4:31
10.	"Bellevue Bridge Club"	4:24
Total length:		45:08

== Other appearances ==
- "Olympians" is based on "Gotholympians" from the live album Fingerlings. Though its lyrics are completely different, a common theme is one-upping others' struggles.

== Personnel ==
- Andrew Bird – vocals, guitar, whistling, violin, production, mixing (1, 5)
- Paul Butler – vocals, production, recording engineer, mixing (2–4, 6–10)
- Tyler Chester – piano, organ
- Madison Cunningham – vocals
- Alan Hampton – bass, vocals
- Blake Mills – guitar
- Ted Poor – drums, percussion
- Abraham Rounds – drums, vocals
- Mike Viola – guitar
- David Boucher – recording engineer
- Eric Boulanger – mastering
- Ryan Whalley – A & R
- Matt Marshall – A & R
- Matthew Daniel Siskin – creative direction
- Sage LaMonica – design and layout
- Amanda Demme – photography
