= Andrew Bird's Bowl of Fire =

American musical group

- Genres: Indie rock, indie folk, folk rock, baroque pop, alternative rock, New Orleans jazz
- Years active: 1997–2003
- Label: Rykodisc
- Website: andrewbird.net

Andrew Bird's Bowl of Fire was an American band fronted by musician Andrew Bird. After releasing his first solo album, Music of Hair, Bird appeared on three albums by Squirrel Nut Zippers before becoming the bandleader for Andrew Bird's Bowl of Fire.

Andrew Bird's Bowl of Fire released Thrills on Rykodisc in 1997, shortly followed by second album Oh! The Grandeur in 1998. Both albums were heavily influenced by traditional folk, pre-war jazz, and swing, with Bird relying on the violin as his primary musical instrument, as well as providing vocals along with his trademark verbose lyrics.

The Bowl of Fire featured musicians from Bird's home town of Chicago, including Kevin O'Donnell, Joshua Hirsch, Jon Williams, Nora O'Connor, Andy Hopkins, Jimmy Sutton, Colin Bunn, and Ryan Hembrey. Members of the Squirrel Nut Zippers, Katharine Whalen and Jimbo Mathus also appeared on Thrills. During this period, Andrew Bird was a member of the jazz group Kevin O'Donnells Quality Six, for which he was the lead singer and violinist and contributed to arrangements and songwriting for the albums Heretic Blues (Delmark 1999) and Control Freak (Delmark 2000) (both Delmark albums were produced by Raymond Salvatore Harmon).

In 2001, the Bowl of Fire released their third album, The Swimming Hour, a dramatic departure from their previous recordings. It featured a mixture of styles, from the zydeco-influenced "Core and Rind" to more straightforward rock songs such as "11:11". Due to this eclectic yet pop-like nature, Bird has often referred to it as his "jukebox album". Although gaining critical praise (The Swimming Hour received a 9.0 from indie music website Pitchfork), the band failed to attain commercial success or recognition, playing to audiences as small as 40 people.

In 2002, Bird was asked to open for a band in his hometown of Chicago, but fellow Bowl of Fire members were unavailable for the date. The reluctant Bird performed the gig alone, and the surprising success of this solo show suggested potential new directions for his music. The Bowl of Fire unofficially disbanded in 2003, and Bird went on to gain mainstream recognition and re-invent himself as a solo artist.

In December 2017, members of the band held a reunion performance at the Hideout Inn in support of the Foundations of Music's Andrew Bird scholarship. The line-up included Andrew Bird, Nora O'Conner, Kevin O'Donnell, and Colin Bunn, as well as Are You Serious bassist Alan Hampton.

== Discography ==
- Thrills (1998)
- Oh! The Grandeur (1999)
- The Swimming Hour (2001)
