= Music of Hair =

Studio album by Andrew Bird
- Released: 1996
- Recorded: August 1996
- Studio: Lakeside Studio
- Length: 55:44
- Label: Self-released; re-released on Grimsey Records and Wegawam Music
- Producer: Andrew Bird

Andrew Bird chronology
Music of Hair (1996)	Thrills (1998)

Music of Hair is the debut studio album by the American singer-songwriter Andrew Bird, released in 1996. The tracks featured were written in Bird's early twenties, and the album was released when he was 23. The album features contributions from musicians Colin Bunn, Dave Dieckmann, Kat Eggleston, Al Ehrich, Kevin O'Donnell; and, James "Jimbo" Mathus, Katharine Whalen and Chris Phillips from Squirrel Nut Zippers.

The title of the album is a reference to Galway Kinnell's poem, "Wait". This poem is also used for the lyrics in the song "Wait," on the album Oh! The Grandeur.

== Track listing ==
No.	Title	Writer(s)	Length
1.	"Nuthinduan Waltz"	melody: Traditional; lyrics: Andrew Bird	4:58
2.	"Ambivalence Waltz"		2:27
3.	"Oh So Insistent"		3:52
4.	"Rhodéàöh"		4:41
5.	"Two Sisters"	theme: Traditional; music and lyrics: Andrew Bird	4:17
6.	"St. Francis Reel"		3:08
7.	"Ratitat/Peter's Wolf/Oblivious Reel"	"Ratitat" - Traditional	5:17
8.	"The Greenhorn/Exile of Erin/Glasgow Reel"	"Exile of Erin" and "Glasgow Reel" - Traditional	4:15
9.	"Pathetique"	text: "Ich Grolle Nicht" - Heinrich Heine; music: Andrew Bird	4:07
10.	"Song of Foot"	"Feet of Mad Shak Dance" - Kevin O'Donnell	2:55
11.	"Minor Beatrice"	"Danse Juba" passage - Traditional; string quartet passage - Maurice Ravel	9:58
12.	"Oh So Sad"		5:49

== Other appearances ==
- Re-recorded versions of the songs "Nuthinduan Waltz" and "Pathetique" are found on the album Thrills.
