= Hands of Glory =

Studio album by Andrew Bird
- Released: October 30, 2012
- Genre: Indie folk
- Length: 35:04
- Label: Mom + Pop

Andrew Bird chronology
| Break It Yourself (2012) | Hands of Glory (2012) | I Want to See Pulaski at Night (2013) |

Professional ratings
Aggregate scores
| Source | Rating |
|---|---|
| Metacritic | 75/100 |
Review scores
| Source | Rating |
| AllMusic | 3.5/5 stars |
| Austin Chronicle | 4/5 stars |
| PopMatters | 8/10 |
| Filter | 84% |
| Pitchfork | 7.3/10 |
| Slant | 3.5/5 stars |
| BPM | 66% |

Hands of Glory is the seventh solo studio album by American singer-songwriter Andrew Bird. It was released in October 2012 through Mom+Pop Records.

== Track list ==
| No. | Title | Writer(s) | Length |
|---|---|---|---|
| 1. | "Three White Horses" | Andrew Bird | 3:13 |
| 2. | "When That Helicopter Comes" | Brett Sparks, Rennie Sparks | 2:53 |
| 3. | "Spirograph" | Alpha Consumer, Andrew Bird | 4:06 |
| 4. | "Railroad Bill" | Traditional | 3:26 |
| 5. | "Something Biblical" | Andrew Bird | 4:34 |
| 6. | "If I Needed You" | Townes Van Zandt | 3:09 |
| 7. | "Orpheo" | Andrew Bird | 4:29 |
| 8. | "Beyond the Valley of the Three White Horses" | Andrew Bird | 9:14 |

== Other appearances ==
- "When the Helicopter Comes" is originally by The Handsome Family, appearing on the album In the Air
- "Orpheo" appears on Break It Yourself as "Orpheo Looks Back"
- "If I Needed You" is a Townes Van Zandt cover, from The Late Great Townes Van Zandt

== Personnel ==
- Andrew Bird – violin, guitar, and vocals
- Tift Merritt – vocals and guitar
- Jeremy Ylvisaker – guitar and backing vocals
- Alan Hampton – bass, backing vocals
- Martin Dosh – drums
- Dan Dorff – tambourine on "Spirograph"

== Charts ==
| Chart (2012) | Peak position |
|---|---|
| US Billboard 200 | 52 |
| US Digital Albums (Billboard) | 23 |
| US Americana/Folk Albums (Billboard) | 5 |
| US Independent Albums (Billboard) | 9 |
| US Top Rock Albums (Billboard) | 15 |
| US Indie Store Album Sales (Billboard) | 14 |
| US Vinyl Albums (Billboard) | 4 |
