= Echolocations: Canyon =

Studio album by Andrew Bird
- Released: 2015
- Genre: New age
- Length: 50:55
- Label: Wegawam Music Co.

Andrew Bird chronology
Things Are Really Great Here, Sort Of... (2014)	Echolocations: Canyon (2015)	Are You Serious (2016)

Echolocations: Canyon is an instrumental album by American violinist Andrew Bird and is his ninth solo studio album. It was recorded inside the Coyote Gulch canyons of Utah, and is intended as the first in a five-part Echolocations series. Echolocations: River was released October 6, 2017, and there are plans for City, Lake, and Forest installments.

== Critical reception ==
Most critics acknowledged the experimental nature of Echolocations: Canyon. Sputnikmusic gave the album a rating of 3.5/5, and wrote that "if you enjoy music that symbolizes nature and even incorporates sonic elements of it in the recording, you will find this album to be amazingly transcendental."

== Track listing ==
No.	Title	Length
1.	"Sweep the Field"	7:14
2.	"Groping the Dark"	10:43
3.	"Rising Water"	5:09
4.	"Antrozous"	7:06
5.	"The Return of Yawny"	3:47
6.	"Before the Germans Came"	8:04
7.	"The Canyon Wants to Hear C Sharp"	8:52
Total length:		50:55
