= Jermaine Rogers =

American artist

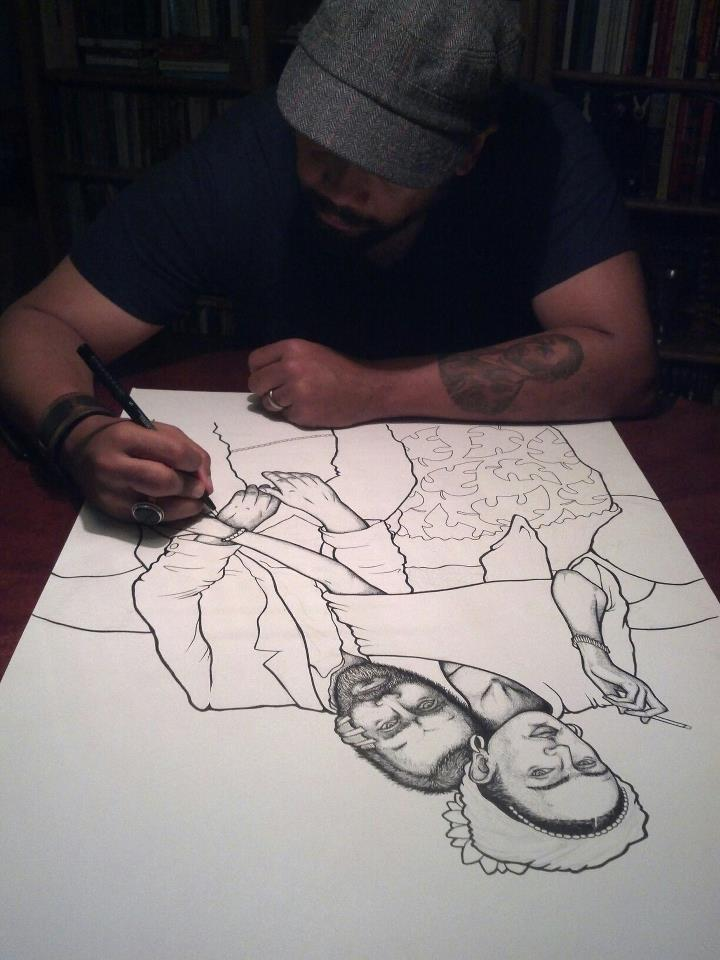
- Born: October 14, 1972 (age 53); Houston, Texas
- Known for: Posters, Music, Designer Toys, Painting, Rock concerts
- Movement: Pop Art, Lowbrow art, Psychedelic Art, Punk rock

Jermaine Rogers (born October 14, 1972 in Houston, Texas) is an artist and designer who came to prominence in the field of modern rock/pop poster art, also known as 'gigposter' art, as well as serigraph and fine art production. Rogers began his career in Houston, Texas as a member of the 1990s Texas poster-art scene, which featured fellow artists Frank Kozik, Uncle Charlie, and Lindsey Kuhn. Since 1995, Rogers has designed posters for a wide variety of musical acts, including Queens Of The Stone Age, David Bowie, Tool, Foo Fighters, Radiohead, Nine Inch Nails, Childish Gambino, The Cure, Run The Jewels, Public Enemy, Soundgarden, and many others. His work is viewed as influential in the modern resurgence of the art form, "continuously crafting images that push boundaries, whether social, cultural, or aesthetic". His work is cataloged among the permanent collections of the Rock And Roll Hall Of Fame in Cleveland, Ohio as well as the Experience Music Project in Seattle, Washington. His work has been featured in various media, including print, television, and feature film. Rogers currently resides in Houston, TX. USA.

== Influences ==
Rogers artistic style is greatly influenced by American underground comic book artwork, as well as advertising artwork of the 20th century. He has cited painters Vincent van Gogh and Egon Schiele, as well as 1950s EC comic artist Graham Ingels, and seminal 'punk rock' poster artists Raymond Pettibon and Frank Kozik as major influences. Jody Goodall, curator of Richard Goodall Gallery in Manchester, England, which features such artists as renowned photographer Anton Corbijn (iconic U2, Miles Davis and David Bowie pics), says Jermaine "took the mantle from Kozik and created a new world of poster art." Rogers advocates what he has called 'culture hijacking', juxtaposing various aspects of pop culture with a plethora of unrelated and classical ideas.

== Designer/Urban Vinyl Figures ==
Rogers is also recognized in the 'designer vinyl' or 'urban vinyl' scene. This involves the creation of limited edition 'art toys': vinyl figures that are marketed to contemporary art collectors and have risen tremendously in value. In 2004, Rogers released his first figure on the vinyl market, 'Dero'. The figure was an immediate critical success and introduced Jermaine as a player in the blossoming movement. His next figure, 2005's 'Squire', was based on a creature that previously appeared in Jermaine's rock-and-roll posters for the bands AFI and Death Cab For Cutie. This figure was well received and cemented Jermaine's place in the genre. Of these toys, Vinyl Pulse stated, "Rather than simply dreaming up interesting characters...Jermaine weaves a storyline which ties them into a larger universe of struggle and deceit." Rogers enjoyed subsequent 'designer vinyl' releases through Strangeco, Jamungo, and Kidrobot. Rogers has additionally released resin, fiberglass and bronze sculptures of his creations.

== Mentions ==
Rogers artwork has been featured in various books including The Art Of Modern Rock, Juxtapox: Poster Art, SWAG: Rock Posters Of The 90's, Gigposters Vol.1: Rock Show Art Of The 21st Century, The Art Of British Rock, Rock Poster Art and others. His vinyl figurines, sculptures and toys have also been mentioned and shown in books such as TOYGIANTS, MTV Overground: Toys, I AM PLASTIC, and I AM PLASTIC, TOO. Rogers has been featured in four documentary films: American Artifact: The Rise Of The American Rock Poster, The Vinyl Frontier, Just Like Being There and TOYS ARE US: A Revolution In Plastic.
