= Just Like Being There =

- Directed by: Scout Shannon
- Produced by: Johanna Goldstein
- Starring: Daniel Danger; Jay Ryan
- Edited by: Thom Newell; Nils Arrington
- Distributed by: Avalanche Films
- Release date: March 9, 2012 (SXSW)
- Running time: 83 minutes
- Country: United States
- Language: English

Just Like Being There is a 2012 documentary film on the American gig poster scene, directed by Scout Shannon.

== Content ==
Gig posters are a part of the independent music scene. Created specifically for a specific show, the artist tries to capture the music and atmosphere in a print.

The documentary explores the origins of the scene and its current state through interviews with poster artists, the featured bands as well as gallery owners. It explains the technique of poster making and highlights milestone events for the formation of the scene such as the Flatstock poster fair at SXSW and art shows of some of the most renowned gig poster artists. Adjacent fields such as movie posters and art prints are also discussed.

== Cast ==
The film is mainly driven by interviews with gig poster artists, their subjects, and gallery owners.

=== Gig poster artists ===
- Jay Ryan
- Daniel Danger
- Olly Moss
- Tyler Stout
- Aesthetic Apparatus
- Erin Page
- Delicious Design League
- Brian Ewing
- Joanna Wecht
- Boss Construction (Andy Vastagh)
- Doe Eyed
- Dirk Fowler
- Bobby Dixon
- Geoff Peveto
- Furturtle (Travis Bone)
- Dan Grzeca
- Lil Tuffy
- Frida Clements
- Mike King
- Landland
- Ryan Duggan
- Dan MacAdam
- Dan McCarthy
- Dan Stiles
- Justin Santora
- Jessica Deahl
- Michael Michael Motorcycle
- Rob Jones
- The Bungaloo (Jon Vogl)
- The Small Stakes (Jason Munn)
- Bureau of Print Research & Design (Francisco Ramirez)
- Little Friends Of Printmaking
- Jermaine Rogers
- Sonnenzimmer
- Kathleen Judge
- Strawberryluna
- Kevin Tong
- Tara MacPherson
- Steve Walters
- Jeff Kleinsmith
- Paloma Chavez
- Todd Slater

=== Musicians and bands ===
- Spoon
- Archers of Loaf
- Hum
- Ted Leo
- Maritime
- Nada Surf
- The Thermals
- Tokyo Police Club
- Okkervil River

=== Printers and art directors ===
- Justin Ishmael, of Mondo, who employs artists to create one-off movie posters for screenings at Alamo Drafthouse Cinema, Austin Texas
- Mitch Putnam, of OMGPosters!
- Laura Stalions, printer at Monolith Press, Oakland, California
- Steve Horvath, printer at DL Screenprinting, Seattle, Washington
- Andy Stern, printer at Diesel Fuel Prints, Portland, Oregon
- Danny Askar, printer, Los Angeles, California

=== Gallery owners ===
- Kerby Kerr, Rotofugi, Chicago
- Jensen Karp and Katie Cromwell, Gallery 1988, Los Angeles
- Sean Leonard, Cotton Candy Machine, New York City
