= Weather Systems (Andrew Bird album) =

Studio album by Andrew Bird
- Released: April 1, 2003
- Genre: Indie folk, baroque pop
- Length: 34:03
- Label: Grimsey Records, re-released on Righteous Babe
- Producer: Mark Nevers

Andrew Bird chronology
The Ballad of the Red Shoes (2002)	Weather Systems (2003)	Andrew Bird & the Mysterious Production of Eggs (2005)

Professional ratings
Review scores
Source	Rating
AllMusic	link
Pitchfork	8.3/10 link

Weather Systems is the second solo studio album by the American singer-songwriter Andrew Bird. Released on April 1, 2003, it was his first studio project after disbanding the band Bowl of Fire. Bird has said that the album was simply a side project during his four or five year recording of Andrew Bird & the Mysterious Production of Eggs. At least two of the songs on the album suggest this fact: "I" is a slower, more dreary version of Armchair Apocrypha's "Imitosis," and "Skin" is a similarly slow, instrumental version of The Mysterious Production of Eggs' "Skin is, My."

The disk features an eight-minute film by Bob Trondson about Bird and the recording of the album. The cover art was done by Jay Ryan.

The first track, "First Song," borrows its title and most of its lyrics from a poem in Galway Kinnell's book, What a Kingdom It Was, published in 1960. The penultimate song, "Don't Be Scared," is Bird's version of a song written and performed originally by The Handsome Family.

== Track listing ==
All tracks are written by Andrew Bird, except where noted.

No.	Title	Writer(s)	Length
1.	"First Song"	Lyrics include excerpt from the poem "First Song" by Galway Kinnell from his book What a Kingdom It Was	4:19
2.	"I"		3:13
3.	"Lull"		5:09
4.	"Action/Adventure"		4:04
5.	"→" ("~" on reissues)		1:36
6.	"Skin"		2:53
7.	"Weather Systems"		6:31
8.	"Don't Be Scared"	The Handsome Family (Brett Sparks and Rennie Sparks)	3:40
9.	"←" ("~~" on reissues)		2:38

== Other appearances ==
- The track "I" is an early version of "Imitosis", which appears on Armchair Apocrypha.
- "Action/Adventure" also appears on Fingerlings.
- "Skin" appears on the album The Mysterious Production of Eggs as "Skin is, My".
- "Don't Be Scared" is originally performed by The Handsome Family on the album Down in the Valley. A newer version by Bird appears on the cover album, Things Are Really Great Here, Sort Of....
