= Sunday Morning Put-On =

Studio album by Andrew Bird Trio
- Released: May 24, 2024
- Studio: Valentine Studios, California
- Genre: Traditional pop; vocal jazz
- Length: 42:24
- Language: English
- Label: Loma Vista

Andrew Bird chronology
Outside Problems (2023)	Sunday Morning Put-On (2024)	Cunningham Bird (2024)

"I like to create these little sabbaticals [between albums] where I scratch an itch that doesn't get scratched when I'm making song albums. I really didn't feel like writing at that time last winter. I wanted to just kind of buckle down and be a student again …. and see where I could get to as a jazz soloist."

—Andrew Bird on the decision to pivot to jazz on Sunday Morning Put-On

Sunday Morning Put-On is a 2024 studio album by American indie rock musician Andrew Bird performing jazz covers as the Andrew Bird Trio. The release has received positive reviews from critics.

== Reception ==
According to the review aggregator Metacritic, Sunday Morning Put-On received "generally favorable reviews" based on a weighted average score of 80 out of 100 from 5 critic scores. Editors at AllMusic rated this album 4 out of 5 stars, with critic Mark Deming writing that this release "Bird making a straightforward jazz album, or at least his version of a straightforward jazz album", with musicianship that "is suburb, coaxing an evocative tone that moves past the traditional approach" to violin-playing on Bird's part with a "dark, smoky voice that beautifully complements the sweet sadness of his vocals that results in "an LP that reminds us just how quietly brilliant Andrew Bird can be". Marc Corrales at The Line of Best Fit rated Sunday Morning Put-On an 8 out of 10, calling it "a pleasant exercise in vocal jazz" that "works less as a one-dimensional celebration to classic jazz and more as a conceptual display of the narrator's wavering composure". Writing for musicOMH, John Murphy rated this release 3 out of 5 stars, characterizing it as "a perfect soundtrack for a Sunday morning coffee and contemplation session as the indie-folkster explores the Great American Songbook", but lacking the emotional depth of Bird's previous work.

Jim Shahan of No Depression called this work one that has "stellar" performances with a "rock-solid rhythm section" and especially strong vocals. In that same magazine, Stacy Chandler profiled Bird and stated that this music has "vocals that croon in a way that transcends time". This was an Editor Pick in Spill Magazine, where Ljubinko Zivkovic rated it a 9 out of 10, ending his review that the combo "love and fully understand these songs making their interpretations sound as good and fresh as any by key artists in jazz". In a profile for WBEZ, Hannah Edgar calls this music a "new direction" for Bird and an "about-face" for covering jazz standards that has the feel of an intimate combo.

== Track listing ==
1. "I Didn't Know What Time It Was" (lyricist: Lorenz Hart, composer: Richard Rodgers) – 3:07
2. "Caravan" (lyricist: Irving Mills, composer: Duke Ellington and Juan Tizol) – 4:32
3. "I Fall in Love Too Easily" (lyricist: Sammy Cahn, composer: Jule Styne) – 3:59
4. "You'd Be So Nice to Come Home To" (Cole Porter) – 2:47
5. "My Ideal" (lyricist: Leo Robin, composer: Newell Chase and Richard A. Whiting) – 4:25
6. "Django" (composer: John Lewis) – 3:27
7. "I Cover the Waterfront" (lyricist: Edward Heyman, composer: Johnny Green and Edward Heyman) – 4:51
8. "Softly, as in a Morning Sunrise" (lyricist: Oscar Hammerstein II, composer: Sigmund Romberg) – 4:11
9. "I've Grown Accustomed to Her Face" (lyricist: Alan Jay Lerner, composer: Frederick Loewe) – 1:49
10. "Ballon de peut‐être" (Andrew Bird) – 9:16

== Personnel ==
Andrew Bird Trio

- Andrew Bird – violin, vocals, production, art direction
- Alan Hampton – bass guitar, upright bass
- Ted Poor – drums, vibraphone

Additional contributors

- David Boucher – mixing, engineering
- Larry Goldings – piano on "I Fall in Love Too Easily"
- Sage Lamonica – package design
- Christopher Leckie – art direction, package design
- Jeff Lipton – mastering
- Jeff Parker – electric guitar on "I Cover the Waterfront", "Softly, as in a Morning Sunrise", "I've Grown Accustomed to Her Face", and "Ballon de peut être"
- Travis Pavur – engineering
- Maria Rice – mastering
- Alexa Viscius – art direction, photography

== See also ==
- 2024 in American music
- 2024 in jazz
- List of 2024 albums
