= The Ballad of the Red Shoes =

EP by Andrew Bird
- Released: 2002
- Length: 12:13
- Label: Self-released, re-released

Andrew Bird chronology
Fingerlings (2002)	The Ballad of the Red Shoes (2002)	Weather Systems (2003)

The Ballad of the Red Shoes is a self-released extended play. It is a collaborative project between Andrew Bird and his mother, Beth Bird, who is a printmaker. In its original printing in 2001, the artwork consisted of an accordion-folded set of prints illustrating a story tucked inside a sturdy printed / handpainted chipboard folder. The new package is slightly less deluxe, the artwork is now in a booklet instead of an accordion fold—otherwise, all of the images remain the same. The CD contains 12 minutes' worth of instrumental violin pieces.

== Track listing ==
No.	Title	Length
1.	"Theme 1 (Waltz)"	1:54
2.	"Something Sinister"	1:37
3.	"Chorus of the Swan"	2:43
4.	"Theme 1 (Restated)"	0:49
5.	"Dance of Death"	1:33
6.	"The Door"	2:10
7.	"Swedish Folk Tune"	1:27

== Other appearances ==
A reworked version of "Dance of Death" appears on the album Fingerlings 4.
