= Echolocations: River =

Studio album by Andrew Bird
- Released: October 6, 2017
- Genre: New age, field recording
- Label: Wegawam Music Co.
- Producer: Adam Samuel Goldman

Andrew Bird chronology
Are You Serious (2016)	Echolocations: River (2017)	My Finest Work Yet (2019)

Echolocations: River is the eleventh solo studio album by American songwriter and musician Andrew Bird. It is the second album in his Echolocations series, the first one being Echolocations: Canyon. The album makes prominent use of field recording, with Bird performing in the Los Angeles River under the Hyperion Bridge. Additional studio recordings were added to supplement the field recordings and flesh out the compositions.

== Track listing ==
No.	Title	Length
1.	"The Cormorants"	2:28
2.	"Ellipses"	6:33
3.	"Lazuli Bunting"	3:38
4.	"Gypsy Moth"	6:33
5.	"Black-Crowned Night-Heron"	4:02
6.	"Down Under the Hyperion Bridge"	9:34
7.	"Dear Killdear"	0:52
8.	"The Green Heron"	6:50

"Gypsy Moth" is a different rendition of Bird's 2016 composition "Roma Fade."

== Reception ==
Steve Horowitz of PopMatters rated the album 8/10, writing: "The ambient sounds of the waterway combine with Bird’s playing and use of sonic effects to create a heightened sense of tranquility."

== Personnel ==
- Andrew Bird – violin, songwriting
- David Boucher – field recordings, mixing
- Adam Samuel Goldman – production, studio recording, additional instruments
