= The Swimming Hour =

Studio album by Andrew Bird's Bowl of Fire
- Released: April 3, 2001
- Genre: Indie rock
- Length: 50:27
- Label: Rykodisc
- Producer: Andrew Bird, David Boucher

Andrew Bird's Bowl of Fire chronology
Oh! The Grandeur (1999)	The Swimming Hour (2001)	Fingerlings (2002)

Professional ratings
Review scores
Source	Rating
AllMusic	link
Pitchfork	9.0/10 link

The Swimming Hour is the fourth studio album by the American singer-songwriter Andrew Bird, and his third and final with the band Bowl of Fire. It comprises a blend of musical styles from the 20th century including jazz, gospel, rock, classical, Latin and folk, often accompanied by thoughtful, playful or haunting vocals and lyrics.

== Track listing ==
All tracks are written by Andrew Bird, except where noted.

No.	Title	Length
1.	"Two Way Action"	4:43
2.	"Core and Rind"	3:02
3.	"Why?"	3:31
4.	"11:11"	3:34
5.	"Case in Point"	4:49
6.	"Too Long" (Mississippi Sheiks cover)	2:33
7.	"Way Out West"	4:06
8.	"Waiting to Talk"	4:13
9.	"Fatal Flower Garden" (Nelstone's Hawaiians cover)	4:43
10.	"Satisfied"	3:17
11.	"Headsoak"	3:53
12.	"How Indiscreet"	4:34
13.	"Dear Old Greenland"	3:29

== Other appearances ==
- Live versions of "Why", "Headsoak" and "How Indiscreet" are found on the album Fingerlings.
