= Fingerlings (album) =

Live album by Andrew Bird
- Released: 2002
- Genre: Indie rock
- Length: 39:22
- Label: Grimsey

Andrew Bird chronology
| The Swimming Hour (2001) | Fingerlings (2002) | The Ballad of the Red Shoes (2002) |

Professional ratings
Review scores
| Source | Rating |
|---|---|
| AllMusic | 4/5 stars |

Fingerlings is a live album by the American singer-songwriter Andrew Bird, released in 2002.

== Bird on Fingerlings ==
"This was scraped together from a number of board tapes that just happened to sound good. It starts off with some early solo shows to duo shows with Nora while on tour with The Handsome Family in Europe in 2001. It builds up to a particularly raucous whiskey/adrenaline fueled show at the Hideout with the Bowl of Fire.
"You get a lot of songs that might otherwise never see the light of day. Some of the more questionable subject-matter that I write for my own entertainment and that might threaten to undermine my integrity as a songwriter (smirk). The show in Tilburg, Nora can't even recall as she had a fever of 102'. It all hangs together pretty well, I think".

== Track listing ==
| No. | Title | Length |
|---|---|---|
| 1. | "Action/Adventure" | 4:55 |
| 2. | "Trimmed + Burning" | 4:52 |
| 3. | "Gotholympians" | 4:12 |
| 4. | "Richmond Woman" | 3:59 |
| 5. | "Sweetbreads" | 4:48 |
| 6. | "Why?" | 3:42 |
| 7. | "Headsoak" | 4:23 |
| 8. | "Indiscreet" | 3:59 |
| 9. | "T'n't" | 4:32 |

== Other appearances ==
- "Action/Adventure" later features on Weather Systems.
- "Gotholympians" is later reworked into "Olympians" on My Finest Work Yet. Though its lyrics are completely different, a common theme is one-upping others' struggles.
- "Richmond Woman" is a cover of a traditional blues song, "Richland Woman Blues," originally recorded by Mississippi John Hurt.
- "Sweetbreads" is later reworked into "Darkmatter" on Armchair Apocrypha.
- "Why?", "Headsoak" and "Indiscreet" appeared previously on the album The Swimming Hour.
- "T'n't" also appears on Oh! The Grandeur as "Tea & Thorazine".
