= Outside Problems =

Studio album by Andrew Bird
- Released: July 21, 2023
- Recorded: During the COVID-19 pandemic
- Studio: Outdoors in Ojai, California
- Length: 42:25
- Language: English
- Label: Loma Vista
- Producer: Andrew Bird

Andrew Bird chronology
Inside Problems (2022)	Outside Problems (2023)	Sunday Morning Put-On (2024)

Outside Problems is a 2023 studio album by American indie rock musician Andrew Bird, released on Loma Vista Recordings. The album has received positive reviews from critics.

== Reception ==
At The Arts Fuse, Alex Szeptycki stated that Bird has "a knack for coming up with pleasing hooks in what is an entirely instrumental album" and characterized this release as "an assemblage of sketches and experiments" that is "a joy to listen to". Kiana Doyle of the Associated Press recommended that listeners compare this to 2022's Inside Problems and ended her review stating that "musical improvisation can be a tricky art form, but Bird makes it sound easy, making this album a real treat". Editors at Pitchfork scored this release 6.9 out of 10 and critic Stephen Thomas Erlewine wrote that "despite its spare instrumentation, Outside Problems never feels skeletal or small" and he characterized it as closing a chapter in Bird's career, calling it "definitionally a footnote, a collection of sketches and explorations that will fascinate listeners who have followed Bird for years".

== Track listing ==
All songs written by Andrew Bird, except where noted.

1. "Mancey" – 4:56
2. "Epilogue" (Bird and Jeremy Ylvisaker) – 6:28
3. "Festivus" – 4:07
4. "What We Saw" – 4:54
5. "Mormon House Party" – 6:17
6. "Mo Teef" – 5:27
7. "Heaven’s Boughs" – 2:21
8. "Improvisation on a Familiar Theme" – 3:26
9. "Tik Tok" – 4:29

== Personnel ==
- Andrew Bird – guitar, violin, vocalizing, audio engineering, production
- Eric Boulanger – audio mastering at The Bakery, Culver City, California, United States
- Todd Burke – engineering, mixing
- Taylor Giali – design, typography
- Alan Hampton – bass guitar
- Sage Lamonica – artwork, layout
- Matthew Daniel Siskin – creative direction

== See also ==
- 2023 in American music
- List of 2023 albums
