= Died Young, Stayed Pretty =

Died Young Stayed Pretty
- Directed by: Eileen Yaghoobian
- Screenplay by: Eileen Yaghoobian
- Story by: Documentary
- Produced by: Eileen Yaghoobian
- Starring: Brian Chippendale; Art Chantry; Rob Jones; Ron Liberti; Bryce McCloud; Jay Ryan (artist); Print Mafia; Tyler Stout; Ames Brothers; Clayton Hayes
- Cinematography: Eileen Yaghoobian; Mahlon Todd Williams
- Edited by: Eileen Yaghoobian
- Music by: Mark Greenberg
- Production company: Norotomo Productions Inc.
- Distributed by: Norotomo Productions Inc. 3DD Entertainment; The Orchard (company); ICA; Films We Like
- Release date: August 21, 2008
- Running time: 95 minutes
- Countries: United States; Canada
- Language: English

Died Young, Stayed Pretty is a 2008 documentary movie on underground indie-rock poster art and its subculture. The film was written, directed and produced by Eileen Yaghoobian who filmed on location in 30 different states from 2004 to 2007. It features posters for Radiohead, White Stripes, Arcade Fire, The Flaming Lips, The Melvins, Nick Cave, Broken Social Scene, Black Keys, Sonic Youth, Pearl Jam, Queens of the Stone Age, Bob Dylan and Marianne Faithfull. Poster artists whose work appear in the film include Ames Bros, Amy Jo Hendrickson, Dan Grzeca, Methane Studios, Todd Slater and Zachary Hobbs.

== Showing ==
The film was an Official Selection of the 2009 SXSW Film Festival, 2008 Montreal World Film Festival and the 2009 San Diego Comic-Con Film Festival. The film opened its theatrical run at the IFC Center (NYC) and ICA London (UK). Died Young, Stayed Pretty is a part of the permanent collection at the Rock and Roll Hall of Fame Museum in Cleveland, Ohio.

== Music ==
Mark Greenberg of the band The Coctails created 16 original tracks for the film. Brian Chippendale of Lightning Bolt (band) and Black Pus are featured.

== Reception ==
The film received mixed reviews with most reviewers praising the film's visual concept and some criticizing its disorganization, and some praised its free-form group portrait of people, Peter Rainer of NPR points to the films deconstruction as "Raw...an outlaw movie about outlaw artists". Ward Sutton of the Village Voice wrote that "Died Young Stayed Pretty is a captivating artifact of an era". Film critic V.A. Musetto of the New York Post gave the film three out of four stars writing, "Yaghoobian's nonlinear editing is as offbeat as the posters…She lets scenes run a few seconds longer than most directors would—to good effect". Dennis Harvey of Variety wrote that it "presents a lot of good art and entertaining personalities..., but lacks any organizing principal or precise point." Vadim Rizov of IndieWire/Spout published a very favorable review praising the editing structure, "Yaghoobian lives for tangents, by-ways, one-offs, weird interview interruptions and non sequiturs; this is the most-edited documentary I've seen in a while, and one of the best-edited too. She's amped up the non-linear, multi-dialectical logic of Fast, Cheap & Out Of Control to a faster tempo (if not as strangely affecting, it has an equally eccentric score by Mark Greenberg)." On review aggregator Rotten Tomatoes the film is rated 63% based on the reviews of 30 critics.
