= Jay Ryan (artist) =

American musician

Jay Ryan (born June 15, 1972, in St. Louis, Missouri) is an American poster designer, and rock musician. He is noted for his squirrel posters, as well as being a bassist in the band Dianogah. He works in Skokie, Illinois.

== Biography ==
Ryan produces limited run, hand-printed posters for rock bands and concerts, and for events such as art shows. Most of his work is screen printed at his print shop, The Bird Machine. He has produced posters for the bands Shellac and the Flaming Lips, as well as thousands of others; he is also responsible for the album art and track illustrations of Andrew Bird's The Mysterious Production of Eggs and Weather Systems. He started making posters in 1995.

In 2005 he published a book called 100 Posters, 134 Squirrels: A Decade of Hot Dogs, Large Mammals, and Independent Rock: The Handcrafted Art of Jay Ryan. He also provided the cover art for Michael Chabon's 2004 novel The Final Solution and publicity art for Chicago's 57th Street Art Fair. He was featured in the documentary film Just Like Being There (2012). In 2025 he illustrated the Field Museum of Natural History exhibit After the Age of Dinosaurs.

Ryan had previously been a bassist for Braid, but left shortly after its formation. He then joined Hubcap, before forming Dianogah in 1995.

Jay Ryan attended New Trier High School in Winnetka, Illinois.

== Sources ==
- Anders Smith Lindall, "Off the Wall: Jay Ryan's Whimsical Illustrations Put a Face on the Chicago Rock Scene", Chicago Sun-Times, Tuesday, December 20, 2005, p. 49
- Jay Ryan, 100 Posters, 134 Squirrels: A Decade of Hot Dogs, Large Mammals, and Independent Rock: The Handcrafted Art of Jay Ryan, Akashic Books, Chicago, Illinois 2005 ISBN 9781888451931
