= Soldier on the Wall =

The Soldier on the Wall

Studio album by Alex Harvey
- Released: 1982
- Recorded: September/October 1981
- Studio: Kingsway Recorders, Holborn, London
- Genre: Rock
- Length: 35:14
- Label: Powerstation Records
- Producer: Kevin D. Nixon

Alex Harvey chronology
| The Mafia Stole My Guitar (1979) | The Soldier on the Wall (1982) |

CD Reissue cover

Professional ratings
Review scores
| Source | Rating |
|---|---|
| AllMusic | 4/5 stars |
| The Encyclopedia of Popular Music | 3/5 stars |
| Uncut | 1.5/5 stars |

The Soldier on the Wall is the final album recorded by Alex Harvey. The album was recorded in September/October 1981 and released shortly after Harvey's death.

== Track listing ==
| No. | Title | Length |
|---|---|---|
| 1. | "Mitzi" | 4:07 |
| 2. | "Billy Bolero" | 4:46 |
| 3. | "Snowshoes Thompson" | 3:16 |
| 4. | "Roman Wall Blues" | 5:24 |
| 5. | "The Poet and I" | 4:20 |
| 6. | "Nervous" | 4:51 |
| 7. | "Carry the Water" | 4:22 |
| 8. | "Flowers Mr. Florist" | 4:04 |
| 9. | "The Poet and I (Reprise)" | 1:28 |

== Personnel ==
- Alex Harvey - lead vocals, producer
- Tony Lambert - keyboards
- George Hall - keyboards
- Ian "Toose" Taylor - guitar
- Jack Dawe - bass guitar
- Colin Griffin - drums
- Andy Nolan - percussion
- Gordon Sellar - bass on "The Poet and I"
- Tommy Eyre - keyboards on "The Poet and I"
- Ray Conn - harmony - writer - producer - on "The Poet and I"

=== Additional personnel ===
- Kevin D. Nixon - producer
- Paul "Chas" Watkins - engineer
- Roy Neave - mix engineer
- Viv Ratcliffe - front cover
- Charles Daykin - artwork

== 2003 reissue ==
In 2003, the album was given a compact disc release, with only the first four tracks being remastered from their original master tapes. The project was almost abandoned because the second master tape for the other five tracks (the B side of the vinyl album) couldn't be traced. Production staff managed to obtain a good quality copy of the original 1982 vinyl on loan. They digitised and "cleaned up" (as best they could with the technology available at the time) the remaining five tracks, and released them. Consequently, this led to slight surface noise appearing on those tracks; it is most noticeable with some light crackle on the quiet piano introduction to track 5, "The Poet and I".

The CD version has a different cover from the original and liner notes by Harvey's widow, Trudy.
