= Inside Problems =

Studio album by Andrew Bird
- Released: June 3, 2022
- Studios: United Recording Studios (Hollywood, CA); Barebones Studios
- Genres: Chamber pop; folk rock; indie folk; indie rock
- Length: 48:21
- Label: Loma Vista
- Producer: Mike Viola

Andrew Bird chronology
| These 13 (2021) | Inside Problems (2022) | Outside Problems (2023) |

Inside Problems is the fourteenth solo studio album by American singer-songwriter Andrew Bird. It was released on June 3, 2022 through Loma Vista Recordings. Recording sessions took place at United Recording Studios in Hollywood and at Barebones Studios. Production was handled by Mike Viola. It featured contributions from Abraham Rounds, Alan Hampton, Jimbo Mathus, Madison Cunningham and Mike Viola. The album peaked at number 31 on the Top Album Sales chart in the United States, while the song "Make a Picture" off of the project reached number 25 on the Adult Alternative Airplay chart. It also made it to number 95 on the Swiss Hitparade.

== Critical reception ==
Professional ratings
Aggregate scores
| Source | Rating |
|---|---|
| Metacritic | 75/100 |
Review scores
| Source | Rating |
| AllMusic | 3.5/5 stars |
| Beats Per Minute | 68%/100% |
| Mojo | 4/5 stars |
| musicOMH | 3/5 stars |
| Pitchfork | 7.4/10 |
| PopMatters | 8/10 |
| Record Collector | 4/5 stars |
| Spectrum Culture | 55%/100% |
| Uncut | 7/10 |
| Under the Radar | 7/10 stars |

Inside Problems was met with generally favorable reviews from music critics. At Metacritic, which assigns a normalized rating out of 100 to reviews from mainstream publications, the album received an average score of 75, based on nine reviews.

Sylvie Simmons of Mojo stated that "these 11 songs - several expansive - are often sophisticated indie pop with a lot going on. musically and lyrically". David Pike of PopMatters noted: "it's perhaps the first time Bird has made his songs so easily accessible to his audience". In his review for Pitchfork, Stephen Thomas Erlewine wrote: "these 11 songs may be meant to chronicle a pointedly personal inner voyage, yet he's wound up with a warm, collaborative record that feels like a balm for fear and loneliness". Mark Deming in his AllMusic review found that the album "deals with weighty themes in a modest, manageable way, and that's one of its greatest virtues; here, Andrew Bird is a mildly quirky regular guy with some thoughts to share and a fiddle to help carry them across, and self-analysis is rarely as fun and rewarding as this". Sharono Connell of Uncut wrote: "Inside Problems is a rather less meticulous and more spirited band set that examines the questions that keep him awake at night, in ear-snagging songs shot through with '70s country rock, chamber pop, Balkan and Appalachian folk and Tin Pan Alley eccentricity". Scott Dransfield of Under the Radar praised the work with words: "it's a good entry point for new listeners, as well as a charming and familiar set for those who have been on the ride all along". Ray Finlayson of Beats Per Minute wrote: "like a lot of Andrew Bird albums of late, Inside Problems needs some time to reveal itself. Its frustrations and lidless graspings at the world are part of the game here, so that it doesn't nestle quickly into a box on first listen feels appropriate".

In mixed reviews, Andy Jex of musicOMH stated: "the only problem with Inside Problems is that it's possibly too arch and mannered to appeal much beyond those familiar with Bird-lore". Justin Vellucci of Spectrum Culture wrote: "Inside Problems is a decent collection to skim through on Spotify or your streaming platform of choice. As a collection proper, though? A solo LP? Andrew Bird's done a lot better than this – and that's a shadow that unfortunately looms large over the new material".

== Track listing ==
All tracks are written by Andrew Bird, except track 11 written with Jeremy Ylvisaker.

| No. | Title | Length |
|---|---|---|
| 1. | "Underlands" | 6:15 |
| 2. | "Lone Didion" | 4:23 |
| 3. | "Fixed Positions" | 2:58 |
| 4. | "Inside Problems" | 4:16 |
| 5. | "The Night Before Your Birthday" | 4:07 |
| 6. | "Make a Picture" | 3:25 |
| 7. | "Atomized" | 4:45 |
| 8. | "Faithless Ghost" | 3:42 |
| 9. | "Eight" | 6:48 |
| 10. | "Stop n’ Shop" | 3:50 |
| 11. | "Never Fall Apart" | 3:52 |
| Total length: | | 48:21 |

== Personnel ==
- Andrew Bird — vocals, songwriter, guitar, violin
- Michael A. "Mike" Viola — additional vocals, guitar, bass, producer, recording
- Alan Hampton — additional vocals, guitar, bass
- Abraham Rounds — additional vocals, drums, percussion
- Madison Cunningham — additional vocals
- James H. "Jimbo Mathus" Mathis, Jr. — banjo
- Jeremy Ylvisaker — songwriter (track 11)
- David Boucher — recording, mixing
- Eric Boulanger — mastering

== Charts ==
Chart performance for Inside Problems
| Chart (2022) | Peak position |
|---|---|
| Swiss Albums (Schweizer Hitparade) | 95 |
| US Top Album Sales (Billboard) | 31 |
