= Soldier On (EP) =

EP by Andrew Bird
- Released: November 2007
- Genre: Indie folk, baroque pop
- Length: 35:08
- Label: Grimsey Records; Fargo Records

Andrew Bird chronology
Armchair Apocrypha (2007)	Soldier On (2007)	Noble Beast (2009)

Professional ratings
Review scores
Source	Rating
Pitchfork	7.7/10

Soldier On is an EP by American musician Andrew Bird.

== Track listing ==
No.	Title	Writer(s)	Length
1.	"The Trees Were Mistaken"		6:29
2.	"Sic of Elephants"		4:45
3.	"The Water Jet Cilice" (Previously released as "Self-Torture" via eMusic)		3:40
4.	"Plasticities" (Alternate Version)		3:52
5.	"Heretics" (Early Version)		3:43
6.	"Sectionate City"		2:46
7.	"How You Gonna Keep 'Em Down on the Farm"		5:04
8.	"Oh Sister"	Bob Dylan, Jacques Levy	4:49

== Other appearances ==
- "The Water Jet Cilice" appears as a bonus track on Armchair Apocrypha with the name "Self-Torture"
- A version of "Heretics" also appears on Armchair Apocrypha
- "How You Gonna Keep 'Em Down on the Farm" is a cover of the World War I-era song, How Ya Gonna Keep 'em Down on the Farm (After They've Seen Paree)?. The lyrics are the same, but the melody, chords, and tone have been changed.
- "Oh Sister" is a Bob Dylan cover, originally from the album Desire
- A live version of "Sic of Elephants" was recorded for 30 Days, 50 Songs
