= Todd Slater =

American poster artist (born 1979)

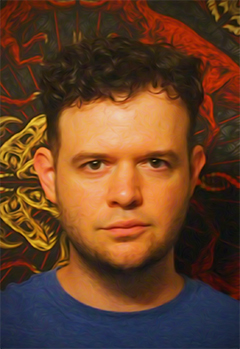
- Self-portrait photo of Todd Slater - July 2015
- Born: Todd Christopher Slater; July 11, 1979 (age 46); Peoria, Illinois, United States
- Education: Stephen F. Austin State University
- Known for: graphic design, poster art, concert posters
- Website: www.toddslater.net

Todd Slater is an American poster artist who specializes in concert posters for indie and mainstream rock musicians. The many acts for whom he has produced posters include Jack White, Widespread Panic, Ween, Avett Brothers, Pearl Jam, Arctic Monkeys, Foo Fighters, Queens of the Stone Age, Dave Matthews, Black Keys, Primus, Muse, and Neil Young. He also produces film posters for the specialist Mondo Gallery in Austin, Texas, USA.

A limited edition fine art print of Todd Slater's Goldfinger Mondo film poster was sold at auction by Christie's in October 2013 for $3,294 US.

== Background ==
=== Personal life ===
Slater was born in July 1979 in Peoria, Illinois, United States. His father, Wayne Slater, is an author and has been a political writer for the Dallas Morning News since the mid-1980s; he has co-written three books with James Moore, including Bush's Brain. Todd Slater's mother is an English teacher. The Slater family moved to Austin, Texas when Todd was five years old. Slater is married to wife Kristie with whom he has three children.

=== Education ===
Todd Slater graduated from Stephen F. Austin State University, Nacogdoches in Texas in 2002, majoring in art with an emphasis on design and minors in film and painting.

Slater learned about digital media during an internship with Dave Turton at The Graphic Library, a producer of stock illustrations for Istockphoto.

=== Career ===
Slater realized that making concert posters was what he wanted to do after discovering gigposters.com. He started producing posters professionally when aged 24.

His first professional poster commission was for Pretty Girls Make Graves. He started sending unsolicited White Stripes poster designs to the band's tour manager and this led to him working with Rob Jones, who produced The White Stripes' gig posters, and later collaborations between Jones and Slater on gig posters for Jack White and Dave Matthews.

Slater turned freelance in 2004.

=== Influences ===
Todd Slater has cited a number of artistic influences including:

- 1966–1968 Chicago art movement The Hairy Who
- Fear and Loathing in Las Vegas (an influence on some of Slater's imagery)
- Figurative painters including Steven Assael, Lisa Yuskavage, Jenny Saville, John Currin and Peter Saul
- Aesthetic Apparatus
- Ames Bros.

== Work ==
Much of Slater's work is for major alternative bands, although he also has produced tour posters for some established and mainstream artists. Although not a core part of Slater's work he has expressed an interest in album cover art, and produced six vinyl single sleeves for The Dead Weather in 2009.

Slater produces film posters for the Mondo Gallery.

Stylistically Slater's gig poster designs tend to concentrate on the imagery and minimize the amount and size of text. Most of his work is done on a computer with some elements done by hand. Each poster takes about 40 hours to produce.

=== Concert poster clients ===
Artists for whom Todd Slater has produced gig posters include:

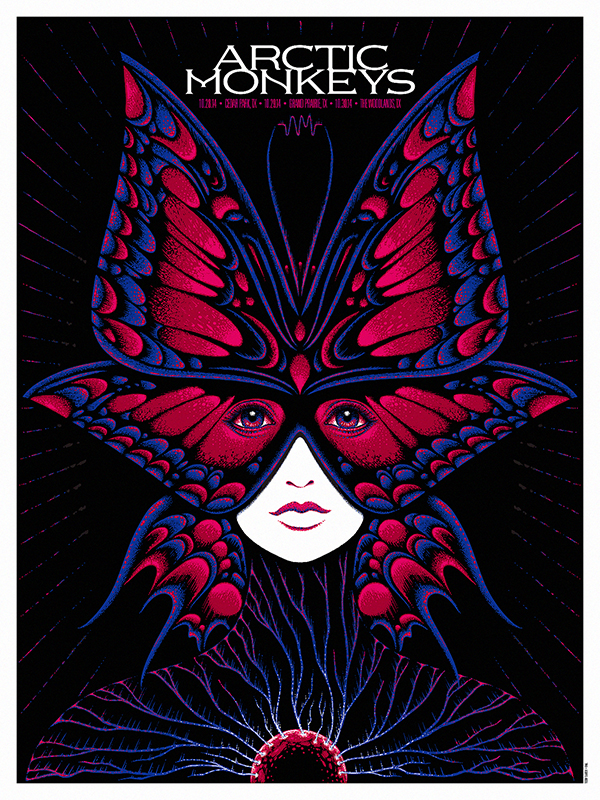
Limited edition print of Todd Slater gig poster produced for the Arctic Monkeys concerts at Cedar Park, Grand Prairie and The Woodlands, Texas, October 28–30, 2014.

- Arcade Fire
- Arctic Monkeys
- The Avett Brothers
- Bad Religion
- The Beastie Boys
- The Black Keys
- Bob Dylan
- Bruno Mars
- CAKE
- Colonel Claypool
- The Cramps
- Dave Matthews
- Dead Weather
- Death Cab For Cutie
- Decemberists
- Eddie Vedder
- Edward Sharpe and the Magnetic Zeros
- Eisley
- Elvis Costello
- Fleetwood Mac
- Foo Fighters
- Franz Ferdinand
- Green Day
- Guided by Voices
- Incubus
- Jack Johnson
- Jack White
- Keane
- The Lumineers
- Luna
- Madonna
- Mars Volta
- MGMT
- Misfits
- Modest Mouse
- Mogwai
- Morrissey
- Mumford & Sons
- Muse
- The National
- Neil Young
- Pearl Jam
- Phish
- Pixies
- Pretty Girls Make Graves
- Queens of the Stone Age
- Radiohead
- Reverend Horton Heat
- Slayer
- The Strokes
- Taking Back Sunday
- Tegan and Sara
- They Might Be Giants
- Velvet Revolver
- Ween
- White Stripes
- Widespread Panic
- Wilco
- Yeah Yeah Yeahs
- Yo La Tengo

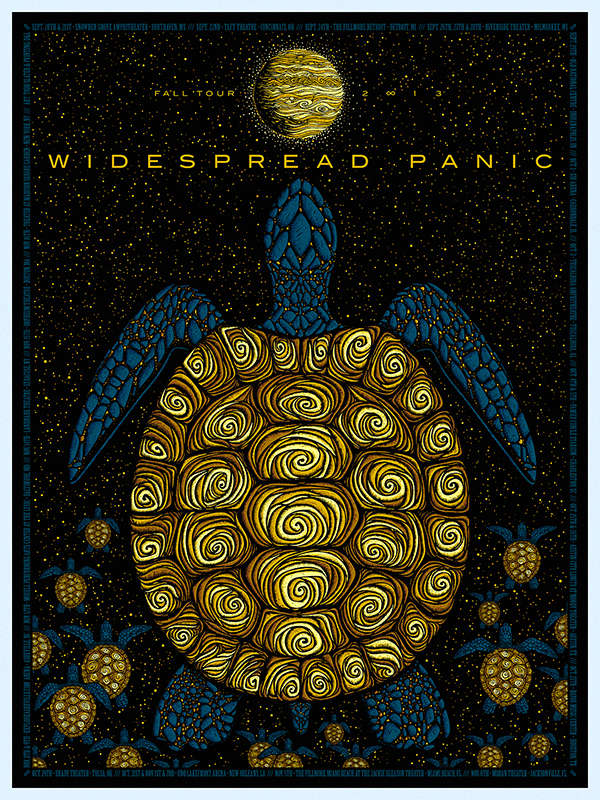
Limited edition print of Todd Slater gig poster produced for the Widespread Panic fall 2013 tour.

Artist web pages featuring Todd Slater's work:

- Arctic Monkeys
- Muse
- Primus

=== Film posters ===
Film posters Todd Slater has produced for the Mondo Gallery include:

- The Big Lebowski
- Boogie Nights
- Clerks
- Close Encounters of the Third Kind
- Evil Dead II
- Goldfinger
- Great Warrior (Star Wars)
- Jurassic Park
- Labyrinth
- Office Space
- Pacific Rim
- Plan 9 from Outer Space
- Planet of the Apes
- QT Fest 6
- Repo Man
- RoboCop
- Star Trek: The Corbomite Maneuver
- Stargate
- Treebeard (The Lord of the Rings)

== Bibliography ==
The following books feature Todd Slater's work:

- Slater, Todd (12 October 2015). The Rock Poster Art of Todd Slater. Flood Gallery Publishing, ISBN 978-0-9928366-2-7.
- Loren, Derek & Farren, Mick (November 2013). Classic Rock Posters. Metro Books, ISBN 1-4549-1192-1.
- Booth, Tom (2012). The Wall: Inside The Poster Studio Vol. 2. Badtown
- Rabin, Nathan with Yankovic, Al (September 2012). Weird Al: The Book. Harry N. Abrams, ISBN 1-4197-0435-4.
- Durchholz, Daniel & Graff, Gary (November 2012). Neil Young: Long May You Run: The Illustrated History. Voyageur Press, ISBN 0-7603-4411-6.
- Maiffredy, Didier (December 2012). Rock Poster Art: Sérigraphies de concert. Eyrolles, ISBN 2-2121-3470-3.
- Booth, Tom (2011). The Wall: Modern Day Music Posters. Badtown.
- Klanten, R & Hellige, H (May 2011). Impressive: Printmaking, Letterpress and Graphic Design. Gestalten, ISBN 3-8995-5368-3.
- Hunter, Dave (October 2010). Star Guitars: 101 Guitars That Rocked the World. Voyageur Press, ISBN 0-7603-3821-3.
- Hayes, Clay (April 2009). Gig Posters Volume 1. Quirk Books, ISBN 1-5947-4326-6.
- Klanten, Robert (April 2009). Naïve: Modernism and Folklore in Contemporary Graphic Design. Gestalten, ISBN 3-8995-5247-4.
- Hellige, Hendrick (May 2007). Supersonic: Visuals for Music. Die Getalten Verlag, ISBN 3-8995-5186-9.
- Kaye, Joyce Rutter (editor) (2007). Print: Regional Design Annual 2007. Print Magazine, ASIN B0012HMZE4.

Other publications featuring Todd Slater's work:

- Gig Posters: 2016 Wall Calendar. Amber Lotus Publishing.

== Documentaries ==
The following documentaries feature Todd Slater and/or his work:

- Died Young, Stayed Pretty / Dir: Eileen Yaghoobian / Norotomo Productions / 2008
- Just Like Being There / Dir: Scout Shannon / Avalanche Films / 2012
- Twenty-Four by Thirty-Six / Dir: Kevin Burke / Post No Joes Productions / 2016
