= Fingerlings 3 =

Live album by Andrew Bird
- Released: 2006
- Genre: Indie rock
- Label: Grimsey

Andrew Bird chronology
The Mysterious Production of Eggs (2005)	Fingerlings 3 (2006)	Armchair Apocrypha (2007)

Fingerlings 3 is the third album in a series of live releases by the American singer-songwriter Andrew Bird. Unlike the previous Fingerlings, Fingerlings 3 contains songs not recorded live in front of an audience; "Dear Dirty" is a studio track and "The Water Jet Cilice" and "Ethiobirds" were recorded live (solo) at Andrew's home studio in a barn in rural western Illinois. Tracks "Dark Matter" and “Scythian Empire" are live recordings of songs that were later included on Bird's 2007 album Armchair Apocrypha.

== Track listing ==
No.	Title	Length
1.	"Grinnin'"
2.	"Darkmatter"
3.	"The Water Jet Cilice"
4.	"Measuring Cups"
5.	"The Happy Birthday Song"
6.	"A Nervous Tic Motion of the Head to the Left"
7.	"Scythian Empire"
8.	"Dear Dirty"
9.	"Tin Foil" (Cover of The Handsome Family)
10.	"Ethiobirds"
