= Andrew Bird =

American musician, songwriter, and multi-instrumentalist (born 1973)

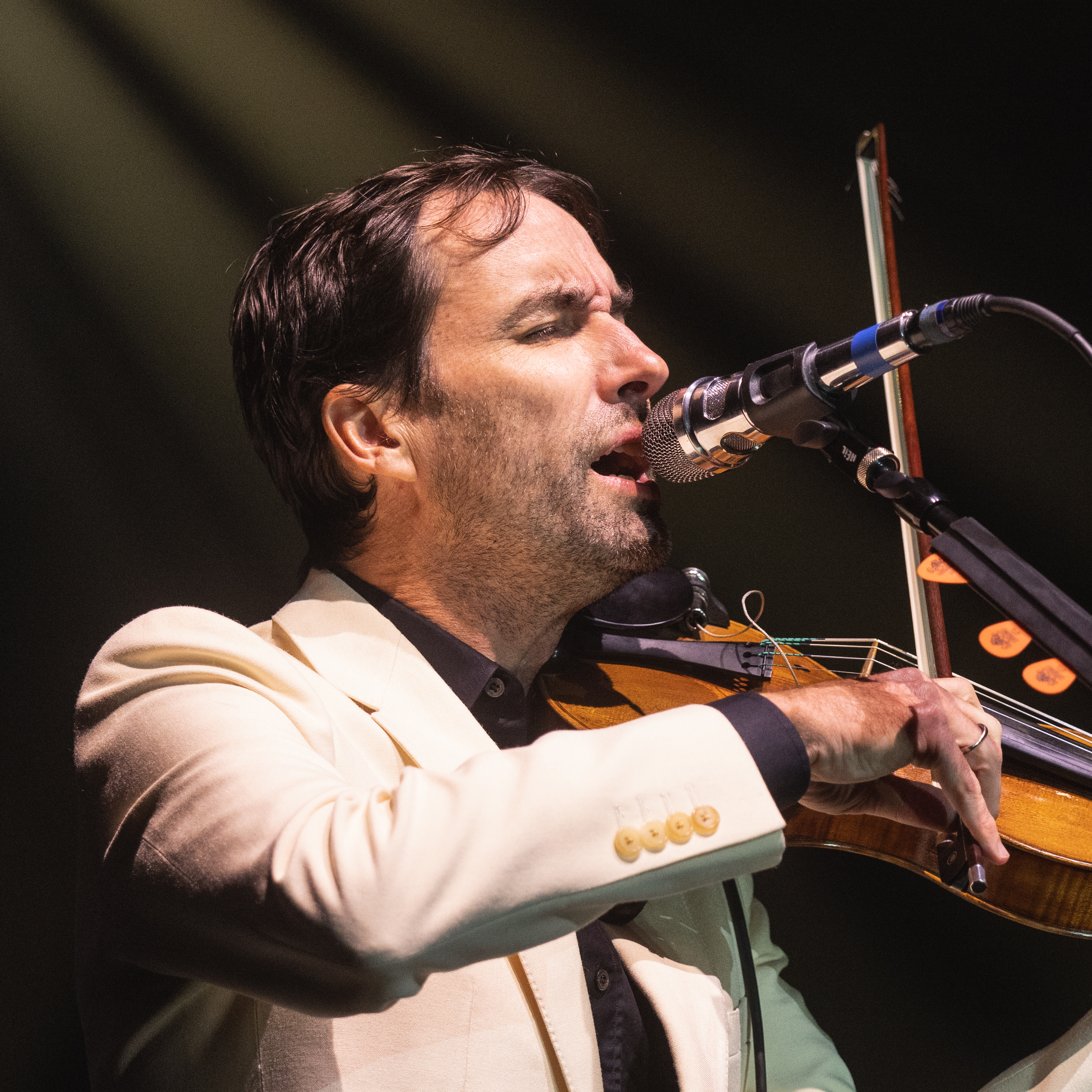
- Bird performing in 2022

Background information
- Born: Andrew Wegman Bird; July 11, 1973 (age 53); Lake Forest, Illinois, U.S.
- Genres: Indie rock
- Occupations: Musician; singer; songwriter; whistler
- Instruments: Vocals; violin; guitar; whistling
- Years active: 1992–present
- Labels: Rykodisc; Righteous Babe; Fat Possum; RCRD LBL; Bella Union; Earwig Music; Waterbug; Carrot Top; Delmark; Mom + Pop; Loma Vista
- Spouse: Katherine Tsina Bird (m. 2010)
- Website: andrewbird.net

Andrew Wegman Bird (born July 11, 1973) is an American singer, songwriter, and musician. His albums have spanned various genres including swing music, indie rock, and folk music. He is primarily known for his unique style of violin playing, accompanied by loop and effect pedals, whistling, and vocals.

In the 1990s, he sang and played violin in several jazz ensembles, including Squirrel Nut Zippers and Kevin O'Donnell's Quality Six. He went on to start his own swing ensemble, Andrew Bird's Bowl of Fire, which released three albums between 1998 and 2001. Weather Systems (2003) was his first solo album after Bowl of Fire disbanded, and it marked his departure from jazz music into indie music. Bird's 2019 album My Finest Work Yet was nominated for "Best Folk Album" at the 2020 Grammy Awards. He has collaborated with various artists, including The Handsome Family, Dosh, Fiona Apple, Madison Cunningham, and Nora O'Connor.

Bird appeared as Dr. Stringz in a 2007 episode of Jack's Big Music Show. In 2010, he appeared on a TED Talk performing his music. He wrote and whistled "The Whistling Caruso" for The Muppets movie in 2011, and composed the score for the television series Baskets, released in 2016. In 2019, Bird was cast in the fourth installment of Fargo, playing Thurman Smutny.

== Biography ==
=== Early life and Bowl of Fire (1973–2002) ===
Andrew Bird was born in Lake Forest, Illinois, and raised in the North Shore of Chicago. He was raised Catholic, attending the Church of St. Mary in Lake Forest and attending Sunday school until he was "effectively kicked out [...] for mocking God." He is now a lapsed Catholic.

Bird's mother took him to violin lessons as a child and he trained in the Suzuki method starting at the age of four. His mother also learned how to play the violin from these lessons. He learned how to whistle from his grandmother at age 6 and learned bird-calls throughout his youth. He started taking violin seriously when he was around 13. Bird didn't learn how to read sheet music until high school, learning originally by ear.

Bird attended Interlochen Arts Camp in his youth. He graduated from Lake Forest High School in 1991 and from Northwestern University with a bachelor's degree in violin performance in 1996. That same year he self-released his first solo album, Music of Hair. This album pays tribute to folk traditions, as well as jazz and blues. Following this, his initial commercial exposure came through collaborative work with the band Squirrel Nut Zippers, appearing on three of their albums (Hot, Sold Out, and Perennial Favorites) between 1996 and 1998.

Bird released Thrills on Rykodisc in 1998 with his group Andrew Bird's Bowl of Fire, shortly followed by a second album, Oh! The Grandeur, in 1999. Both albums were heavily influenced by folk, jazz, and swing, with Bird primarily on violin as well as providing vocals. Bowl of Fire featured musicians from Bird's hometown of Chicago, including Kevin O'Donnell, Joshua Hirsch, Jon Williams, Nora O'Connor, Andy Hopkins, Jimmy Sutton, Colin Bunn, and Ryan Hembrey. During this period, Bird was a member of the jazz group Kevin O'Donnell's Quality Six, for which he was the lead singer and violinist and contributed to arrangements and songwriting for Heretic Blues (Delmark, 1999) and Control Freak (Delmark, 2000) (both albums were produced by Raymond Salvatore Harmon).

In 2001, Bowl of Fire released their third album, The Swimming Hour. It featured a mixture of styles, from zydeco influences to more straightforward rock. Bird has referred to it as his "jukebox album." Although gaining critical praise, the band failed to attain commercial success or recognition, playing to audiences as small as 40 people. In 2002, Bird was asked to open for a band in his hometown of Chicago, but fellow Bowl of Fire members were unavailable for the date. Bird performed the gig alone, and the solo show was a success.

=== Early solo career (2003–2005) ===
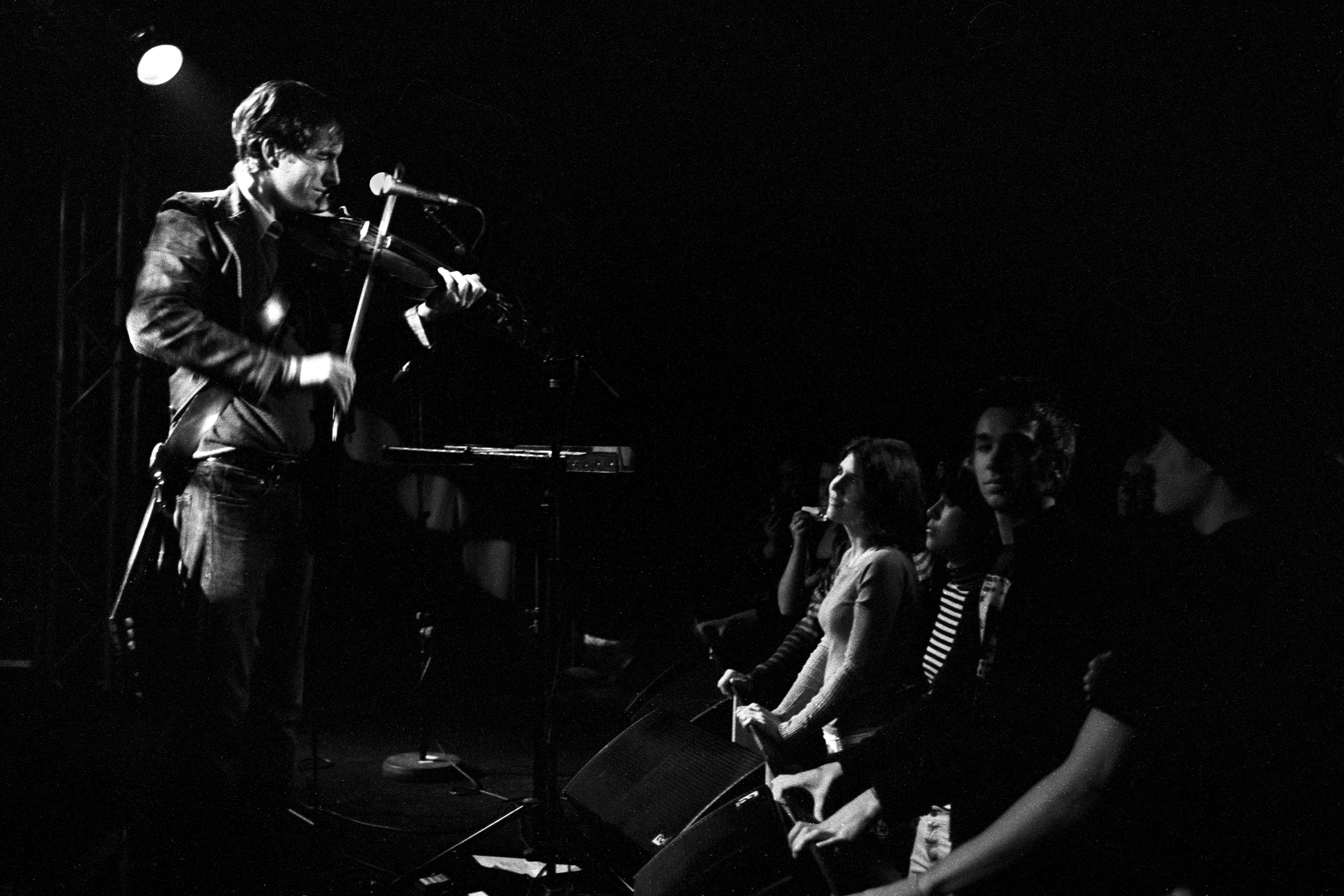
Andrew Bird in concert in 2005.

Bowl of Fire unofficially disbanded in 2003, and Bird reinvented himself as a solo artist. His two subsequent albums were released on Righteous Babe Records. 2003's Weather Systems (originally released on Grimsey Records) features the tracks "Skin" and "I", early versions of songs that would later become "Skin Is, My" (The Mysterious Production of Eggs) and "Imitosis" (Armchair Apocrypha).

The Mysterious Production of Eggs (2005) continued a progression towards an indie–folk sound, featuring layered samples of sound constructed using multitrack recorders and loop pedals. As his sound changed, Bird made increasing use of guitar, glockenspiel, and whistling in his songwriting, in addition to his traditional violin and vocals.

Bird is noted for improvising and reworking his songs during live performances; he has a series of self-released live compilations entitled Fingerlings, Fingerlings 2, Fingerlings 3, and Fingerlings 4, the first of which was released in 2002. Each Fingerlings EP was released prior to a studio album, and presented a mixture of live performances from different shows, including old tracks, covers, and previously unreleased songs, some of which have since appeared on studio albums. Fingerlings 2 provided Bird with a boost in recognition in 2004 when it was named album of the month by Mojo. Fingerlings 3, released in October 2006, also featured studio outtakes.

In 2005, collaborator Dosh joined Bird's lineup, adding percussion and keyboards. Jeremy Ylvisaker was later added to the group on bass and backup vocals.

=== Signed to Fat Possum Records (2006–2011) ===
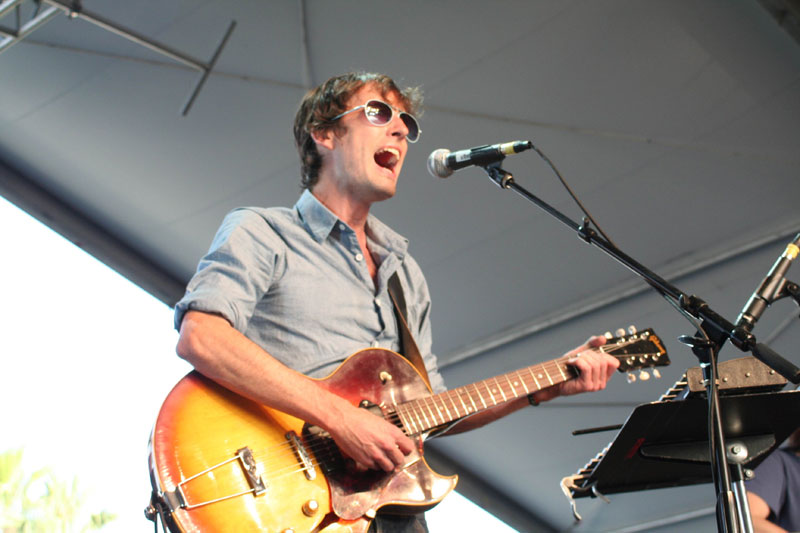
Bird performing at the 2007 Coachella Valley Music and Arts Festival

In September 2006, Bird signed to Fat Possum Records, and in March 2007 he released his third post-Bowl of Fire album, Armchair Apocrypha. The album was recorded in collaboration with electronic musician Dosh, and includes a track composed by Dosh (with lyrics by Bird) entitled "Simple X". This song first appeared without Bird's lyrics as "Simple Exercises" on Dosh's 2004 release Pure Trash. The album was produced by Ben Durrant and also featured Haley Bonar and Chris Morrissey. The album went on to sell over 100,000 copies.

During promotion of Armchair Apocrypha, Bird made his network television debut on April 10, 2007, performing "Plasticities" on the Late Show with David Letterman. He also appeared on Late Night with Conan O'Brien on June 14, 2007, performing "Imitosis". These appearances were accompanied by a tour, which ended with sell-out performances at the Beacon Theatre and the Orpheum Theatre.

In January 2007, Bird made an appearance on the Noggin television network's Jack's Big Music Show, playing the part of Dr. Stringz. Bird sang a brief song called "Dr. Stringz", written specially for the show. He often plays it live as an introduction to the song "Fake Palindromes".

On May 20, 2007, National Public Radio aired a live concert by Bird from Washington, D.C.'s 9:30 Club. He also worked with Reverb, a non-profit environmental organization, for his 2007 spring tour.

Five of his songs – "Banking on a Myth", a medley of "I" and "Imitosis", "Skin", and "Weather Systems" – have been licensed for use by Marriott Residence Inn.

From 2008 to 2013, Bird contributed to "Measure for Measure", a New York Times blog in which musicians wrote about their songwriting process.

In November 2008, he appeared in the second series of Nigel Godrich's From the Basement alongside Radiohead and Fleet Foxes.

Bird's fifth solo album, Noble Beast, was released on January 20, 2009, and contained fourteen new songs. "The Privateers" is a re-imagining of a song entitled "The Confession" from 1999's Oh! The Grandeur. Noble Beast has been met with generally favorable reviews, receiving a score of 79 out of 100 from Metacritic.

In 2009, he contributed a cover of the song "The Giant of Illinois" to the HIV/AIDS benefit album Dark Was the Night, produced by the Red Hot Organization. On May 11, 2009, Bird released the EP Fitz and the Dizzy Spells. It contains "Fitz and the Dizzyspells" from Noble Beast, as well as other songs from that album's recording sessions. He also did a La Blogothèque performance at a house party in Paris in 2009, collaborating with St. Vincent.

In 2010, Bird recorded with the Preservation Hall Jazz Band, contributing vocals and violin on a cover of "Shake It and Break It". In August 2010, Bird contributed a charity T-shirt to the Yellow Bird Project to raise money for the Pegasus Special Riders Fund, which provides therapeutic horse riding activities for adults and children with special needs.

=== Break It Yourself (2011–2015) ===
In late 2011 Bird signed to the record label Mom + Pop Music. Bird's first release for the label was the soundtrack to the film Norman, which included his original score as well as songs by other artists. Bird sequenced the soundtrack to flow as a stand-alone album rather than a compilation of music from the film.

In 2011 Andrew Bird: Fever Year, a feature-length concert documentary on Bird's year-long tour, had its world premiere at Lincoln Center with the New York Film Festival. The film's festival-only run closed in 2013 after screening in over ninety international festivals and winning nine awards. Fever Year depicts Bird and his band during the final months of a tour during which he reportedly suffered from constant fever.

In March 2012, Bird released the album Break it Yourself, the follow-up to 2009's Noble Beast.

In September 2012, Bird announced Hands Of Glory, a companion EP to Break it Yourself. The album was released on October 30.

In 2014, Andrew Bird's song "Pulaski at Night" was featured in the second-season premiere episode of Orange Is the New Black. "Pulaski at Night" was also featured in the first season of Paolo Sorrentino's The Young Pope.

On June 10, 2014, Andrew Bird released his album Things Are Really Great Here, Sort Of..., an album of covers of The Handsome Family and Bird's first record that does not contain any of his own compositions.

=== Are You Serious (2016–2018) ===
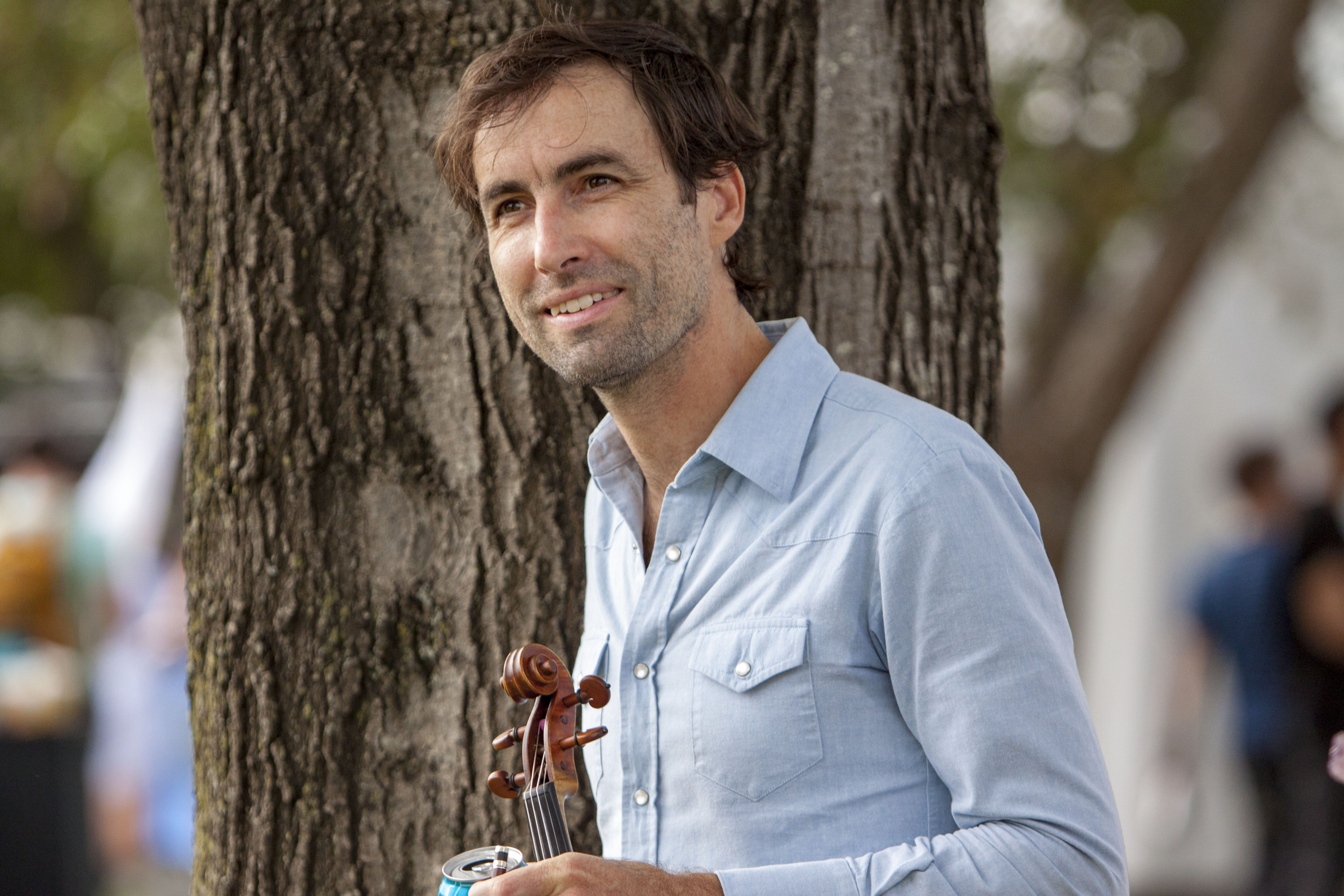
Andrew Bird at Austin City Limits Music Festival in 2016

On April 1, 2016, Bird released his tenth solo album, Are You Serious, with Loma Vista Recordings. The album featured guest vocals from Fiona Apple and includes a reworked version of Bird's earlier track, "Pulaski at Night", renamed "Pulaski".

Andrew Bird toured in support of Are You Serious through much of 2016 and 2017.

He appeared in episode 14 of the Hulu series The Path on February 8, 2017.

He wrote and performed the soundtrack to Lynn Shelton's 2017 film Outside In.

On November 2, 2018, he released the single "Bloodless" backed with "Capital Crimes".

=== My Finest Work Yet (2019–present) ===
On March 22, 2019, Bird released My Finest Work Yet via Loma Vista Recordings. Produced by Paul Butler and Bird, the album was recorded live at Barefoot Studios in Los Angeles, emulating the production and sound of mid-20th century jazz recordings engineered by Rudy Van Gelder. My Finest Work Yet was nominated for the 2020 Grammy Award for Best Folk Album.

In 2019, Andrew Bird was cast in the fourth installment of Fargo, playing, "a character, written specifically for him, named 'Thurman Smutney'."

In 2020 he was featured in an episode of Meditative Story about the musical turning point in his life that led up to making Weather Systems, scored with original music.

On October 30, 2020, Bird released Hark!, his first full-length Christmas-themed album. Six songs from the album initially appeared on an EP, also titled Hark!, which was released digitally in November 2019.

On March 5, 2021, Bird released These 13, a collaborative album with Jimbo Mathus.

On June 3, 2022, Bird released Inside Problems via Loma Vista Recordings. The album was produced by Mike Viola and recorded live by Bird with his four-piece band. Additional vocal overdubs were provided by Madison Cunningham. The same month, Bird started on the Outside Problems tour co-headlining with Iron & Wine, performed at outdoor venues across the United States.

Bird collaborated with Cunningham again in 2024 on a tribute album titled Cunningham Bird—a track-by-track cover of the album Buckingham Nicks (1973) by Lindsey Buckingham and Stevie Nicks with new harmonies and arrangements.

In 2026, Bird recorded a song titled "Need Someone" for the medical drama The Pitt, alongside series composer Gavin Brivik.

Bird celebrated the 20th anniversary of The Mysterious Production of Eggs with the Britten Sinfonia conducted by Jacomo Bairos at the Barbican, London, on February 28, 2026.

== Influences ==
Growing up, Bird was influenced by classical music, Irish tunes, bluegrass, and English and Scottish folk music. His early jazz influences were Johnny Hodges, Lester Young, and Fats Waller. His classical influences include Claude Debussy, Maurice Ravel, and Béla Bartók. Other influences included swing and calypso.

Andrew Bird has made several covers of songs by Americana band The Handsome Family, including "When The Helicopter Comes" on Hands of Glory, "Tin Foiled" on Fingerlings 3, and "Don't Be Scared" on Weather Systems. His album, Things Are Really Great Here, Sort Of... is a ten-song cover album of their music. He also has a personal friendship with the duo.

== Instruments and gear ==
One of Bird's primary instruments is a violin that he acquired when he was 16. His "first serious violin" was custom made by a Polish luthier in Chicago, and Bird had to audition to be allowed to play it. In 2017, following the release of Are You Serious, he commissioned Peter Seman to build a five-string violin. The custom instrument features a lower C string (giving it the range of a viola), has a scroll that bends backwards, and has no corners.

For looping, Bird uses two Line 6 DL4 delay pedals: one for rhythmic pizzicato, and the other for bowed strings. The DL4 can also slow down and speed up loops, lowering or raising the pitch of a recording by an octave in the process. This feature occurs in many of Bird's songs, as well as live performances. He also uses an octave pedal to give the violin the range of a bass.

He began using loop pedals to compensate for performing alone on stage, but later found that looping helped him to "embrace repetition," and compose his songs in a more straightforward manner, since he felt his writing style was too chaotic.

== Band members and associated acts ==
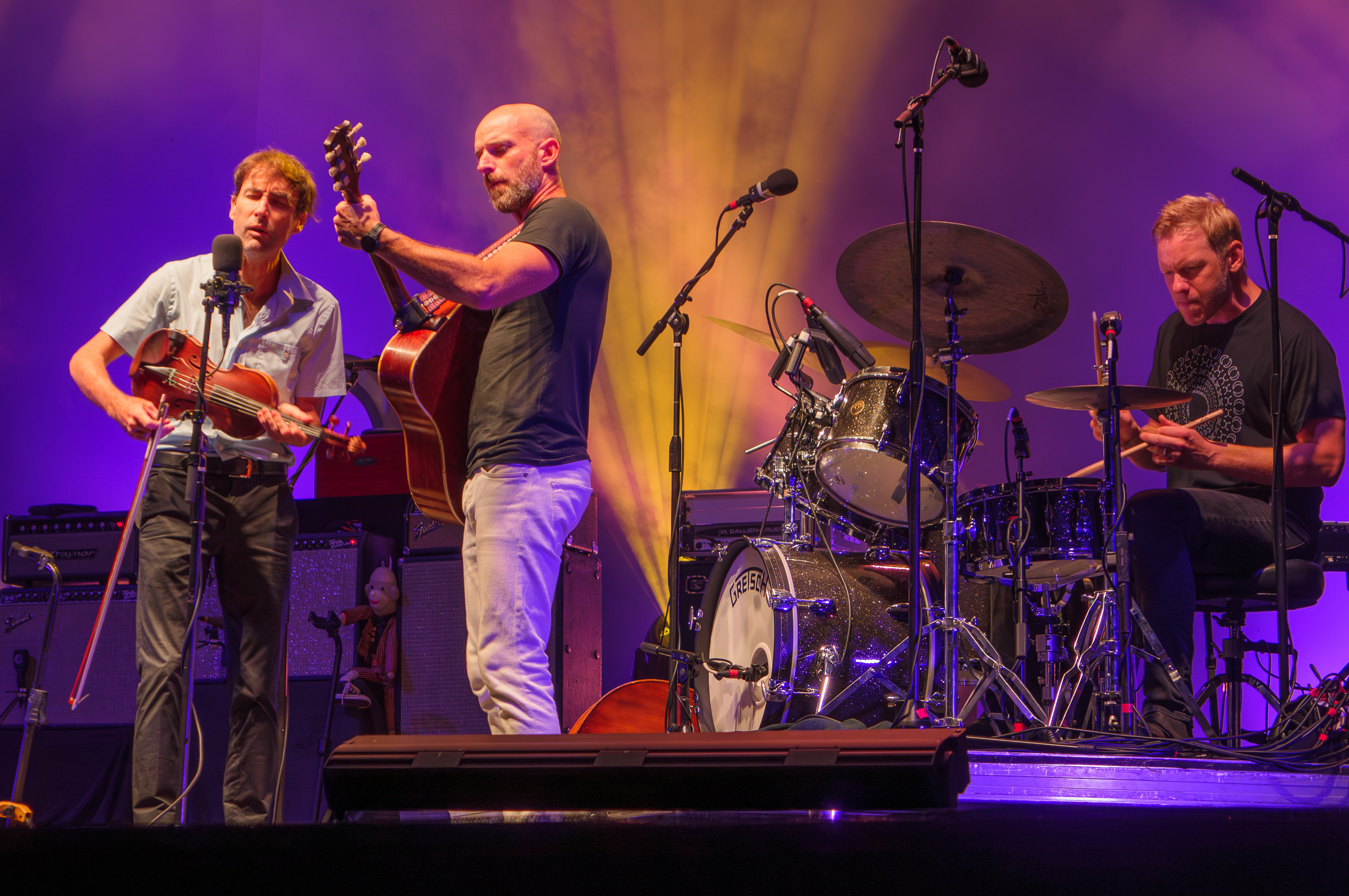
The Andrew Bird Trio, featuring Ted Poor and Alan Hampton, in 2024

Bird does not play with a regular band, and his personnel changes with each album. However, some musicians have appeared on several different albums and performed with Bird on multiple tours.

- Dosh – drums, electric piano. Dosh has provided drumming, keyboard, and loops for Armchair Apocrypha and Noble Beast, as well as samples of his own music.
- Alan Hampton – bass guitar, standup bass, guitar, backup vocals. Hampton first appeared on Hands of Glory in 2012, and has gone on to perform with Bird on Things Are Really Great Here, Sort Of..., Are You Serious, My Finest Work Yet, and Sunday Morning Put-On. Hampton also performed bass for the Bowl of Fire's reunion concert in 2018.
- Tift Merritt – vocals and guitar on Hands of Glory as well as Things Are Really Great Here, Sort Of...
- Nora O'Connor – backing vocals between The Swimming Hour (2001) and Break It Yourself (2012).
- Kevin O'Donnell – drums, percussion, electric piano. O'Donnell met Bird at Northwestern University, played drums in Bird's first band, Charlie Nobody, was the lone consistent member through all Bowl of Fire lineups, and played on all of Bird's albums from 1996's Music of Hair through 2005's Mysterious Production of Eggs (with an additional appearance on one track from Armchair Apocrypha). After ceasing to be the full-time drummer in Bird's bands, O'Donnell backed Bird again on the Hands of Glory and Are You Serious tours, and collaborated on the scores to the film Norman and the FX TV series Baskets. Bird appeared in O'Donnell's jazz ensembles, Kevin O'Donnell's Quality Six and Kevin O'Donnell's National Quartet.
- Ted Poor – drums on Are You Serious, My Finest Work Yet, and Sunday Morning Put-On.
- Jeremy Ylvisaker – guitar and vocals between 2007 and 2012.

=== Hands of Glory ===
Originally "supposed to be a lark, kind of a between records thing," the Hands of Glory was an old-time band started by Andrew Bird. The group toured and recorded one eponymous album in 2012, as well as the cover album Things Are Really Great Here, Sort Of... in 2014.

- Andrew Bird – vocals, violin, guitar, whistling, glockenspiel, loops
- Tift Merritt – vocals, guitar
- Alan Hampton – bass, guitar, vocals
- Eric Heywood – pedal steel
- Kevin O'Donnell – drums

== Personal life ==
Andrew Bird lives in Los Angeles with his wife, fashion designer Katherine Tsina Bird, and their son.

== Awards and nominations ==
Year	Award	Category	Nominated work	Result	Ref.
2019	Grammy Awards	Best Folk Album	My Finest Work Yet	Nominated	
2026	Primetime Emmy Awards	Outstanding Original Music and Lyrics	"Need Someone" (from The Pitt – Episode: "12:00 P.M.")	Won	

== Discography ==
=== Studio albums ===
List of albums, with selected details and chart positions
Title	Album details	Peak chart positions						Sales
Title	Album details	US	US Rock	US Folk	FRA	NLD	UK	Sales
Music of Hair	Released: 1996; Label: Grimsey Records	—	—	—	—	—	—	
Thrills with Bowl of Fire	Released: April 7, 1998; Label: Rykodisc	—	—	—	—	—	—	
Oh! The Grandeur with Bowl of Fire	Released: August 24, 1999; Label: Rykodisc	—	—	—	—	—	—	US: 15,000
The Swimming Hour with Bowl of Fire	Released: April 3, 2001; Label: Rykodisc	—	—	—	—	—	—	
Weather Systems	Released: April 1, 2003; Label: Grimsey Records	—	—	—	—	—	—	
Andrew Bird & the Mysterious Production of Eggs	Released: February 8, 2005; Label: Righteous Babe	—	—	—	93	—	—	US: 80,000
Armchair Apocrypha	Released: March 20, 2007; Label: Fat Possum	76	21	—	124	—	—	US: 100,000
Noble Beast	Released: January 20, 2009; Label: Fat Possum	12	3	—	62	64	—	US: 159,000
Break It Yourself	Released: March 5, 2012; Label: Mom + Pop Music	10	3	1	137	39	100	
Hands of Glory	Released: October 30, 2012; Label: Mom + Pop Music	52	15	5	—	—	—	
Things Are Really Great Here, Sort Of...	Released: June 3, 2014; Label: Wegawam Music	—	—	12	—	—	—	US: 13,000
Echolocations: Canyon	Released: February 3, 2015; Label: Wegawam Music	—	—	—	—	—	—	
Are You Serious	Released: April 1, 2016; Label: Loma Vista	50	8	1	134	—	—	
Echolocations: River	Released: October 6, 2017; Label: Muffet Music	—	—	—	—	—	—	
My Finest Work Yet	Released: March 22, 2019; Label: Loma Vista	141	26	4	117	—	—	
Hark!	Released: October 30, 2020; Label: Loma Vista	—	—	—	—	—	—	
These 13 with Jimbo Mathus	Released: March 5, 2021; Label: Thirty Tigers	— (Note: These 13 did not enter the Billboard 200, but peaked at number 65 on the Billboard Top Album Sales Chart.)	—	—	—	—	—	
Inside Problems	Released: June 3, 2022; Label: Loma Vista	— (Note: Inside Problems did not enter the Billboard 200, but peaked at number 31 on the Billboard Top Album Sales Chart.)	—	—	—	—	—	
Outside Problems	Released: July 21, 2023 (digital), November 17, 2023 (physical); Label: Loma Vista	—	—	—	—	—	—	
Sunday Morning Put-On	Released: May 24, 2024; Label: Wegawam Music	—	—	—	—	—	—	
Cunningham Bird with Madison Cunningham	Released: October 18, 2024; Label: Wegawam Music, Verve	—	—	—	—	—	—	
"—" denotes a recording that did not chart or was not released in that territory.

=== Companion album ===
- Useless Creatures (2010) (Re-release of bonus disc to Noble Beast 2009)

=== Live albums ===
- Fingerlings (2002, Grimsey Records)
- Fingerlings 2 (2004, Grimsey)
- Fingerlings 3 (2006, Grimsey)
- Live at Austin City Limits Music Festival 2007: Andrew Bird (2007, Austin City Limits Music Festival)
- Live in Montreal (2008, Bella Union)
- Fingerlings 4 (2010, Wegawam Music Co.)

=== EPs ===
- The Ballad of the Red Shoes (2002)
- Live at Bonnaroo Music Festival (2006, Live at Bonnaroo Music Festival)
- Soldier On (2007) – European tour EP
- Fitz and the Dizzy Spells (2009)
- Fake Conversations (2012) – 2011 Tour Live EP
- Northwest Passage (2012) – 2012 Tour Live EP
- I Want to See Pulaski at Night (2013)
- Panthology Songs I (2020)
- Panthology Songs II (2020)
- Panthology Songs III (2020)

=== Singles ===
List of Singles With Chart Positions
Year	Song	Peak Chart Positions		Album
Year	Song	US AAA	UK Rock	Album
2005	"Sovay"	—	—	Andrew Bird & the Mysterious Production of Eggs
2006	"Fake Palindromes"	—	14	Andrew Bird & the Mysterious Production of Eggs
2009	"Oh No"	—	—	Noble Beast
2009	"Fitz And The Dizzyspells"	17	—	Noble Beast
2012	"Eyeoneye"	—	—	Break It Yourself
2012	"Desperation Breeds..."	—	—	Break It Yourself
2012	"Three White Horses"	—	79	Hands of Glory
2014	"Anonanimal"	—	—	Non-Album Single
2016	"Capsized"	6	—	Are You Serious
2016	"Left Handed Kisses (feat. Fiona Apple)"	—	—	Are You Serious
2016	"Roma Fade"	—	—	Are You Serious
2016	"Valleys of the Young"	—	—	Are You Serious
2016	"Pulaski"	—	—	Are You Serious
2018	"Bloodless"	—	—	My Finest Work Yet
2019	"Sisyphus"	26	—	My Finest Work Yet
2019	"Manifest"	—	—	My Finest Work Yet
2022	"Atomized"	—	—	Inside Problems
2022	"Underlands"	—	—	Inside Problems
2022	"Make a Picture"	25	—	Inside Problems
"—" denotes a recording that did not chart

=== Other album appearances ===
- Kiltartan Road – Joy to the Morning (1995)
- Kat Eggleston – Outside Eden (1996, Waterbug Records)
- Lil Ed and Dave Weld with The Imperial Flames – Keep on Walkin' (1996, Earwig Music)
- Andrew Calhoun – Phoenix Envy (1996, Earwig Music)
- Charlie Nobody – Soup (1996)
- Squirrel Nut Zippers – Hot (1996, Mammoth Records)
- Squirrel Nut Zippers – Perennial Favorites (1998, Mammoth)
- Rose Polenzani – Dragersville (1998, The Orchard)
- Pinetop Seven – Rigging the Toplights (1998)
- Extra Virgin – Twelve Stories High (1999)
- Kevin O'Donnell – Heretic Blues (1999, Delmark Records)
- Andrew Calhoun – Where Blue Meets Blue (1999, Waterbug)
- Sally Timms – Cowboy Sally's Twilight Laments for Lost Buckaroos (1999, Bloodshot Records)
- Squirrel Nut Zippers – Bedlam Ballroom (2000, Hollywood Records)
- The Handsome Family – In the Air (2000, Carrot Top Records)
- Devil in a Woodpile – Division Street (2000, Bloodshot)
- Kevin O'Donnell – Control Freak (2000 · Delmark Records)
- Neko Case – Canadian Amp (2001)
- The Verve Pipe – Underneath (2001, RCA Records)
- Jenny Toomey – Antidote (2001, Misra Records)
- Kelly Hogan – Because It Feel Good (2001, Bloodshot)
- Sinister Luck Ensemble – Anniversary (2002, Perishable Records)
- Abandon Jalopy – Mercy (2002)
- WYEP Live and Direct: Volume 4 – On Air Performances – "Core and Rind" (2002)
- Kristin Hersh – The Grotto (2003)
- The Autumn Defense – Circles (2003, Arena Rock Recording Co.)
- Bonnie 'Prince' Billy – Sings Greatest Palace Music (2004, Drag City)
- Bobby Bare, Jr. – From the End of Your Leash (2004, Bloodshot Records)
- Ani DiFranco – Knuckle Down (2005, Righteous Babe Records)
- My Morning Jacket – Z (2005, ATO Records)
- Bobby Bare – The Moon Was Blue (2005, Dualtone Music Group)
- Emily Loizeau – London Town (in French and English) (2006)
- Dosh – The Lost Take (2006, Anticon)
- Candi Staton – His Hands (2006, Astralwerks)
- Magnolia Electric Co. – The Black Ram (2007, Secretly Canadian)
- KFOG Live From the Archives Volume 14 – "Imitosis"(2007)
- Song of America – "How You Gonna Keep 'Em Down on the Farm" (2007, Split Rock Records/Thirty One Tigers)
- Charlie Louvin – "Sings Murder Ballads and Disaster Songs" (2008, Tompkins Square)
- Todd Sickafoose – "Tiny Resistors" (2008, Cryptogramophone)
- Dosh – Wolves and Wishes (2008, Anticon)
- Final Fantasy – Plays to Please (2008, Blocks Recording Club)
- Dianogah – Qhnnnl (2008, Southern Records)
- Loney, Dear – Dear John (2009)
- Dark Was the Night – "The Giant of Illinois" (Red Hot Organization, 2009)
- Live at KEXP Vol.5 – Oh No (2009)
- Thao with the Get Down Stay Down – Know Better Learn Faster (2009, Kill Rock Stars)
- Dosh – Tommy
- Twistable Turnable Man: A Musical Tribute to Shel Silverstein – The Twistable, Turnable Man Returns (2010, Sugar Hill Records)
- Muppets: The Green Album – "Bein' Green" (2011, Walt Disney Records)
- Norman (Original Motion Picture Soundtrack) (2011, Mom + Pop Music)
- The Muppets: Original Soundtrack – "The Whistling Caruso" (2011, Walt Disney Records)
- Holidays Rule – "Auld Lang Syne" (2012, Hear Music/Concord Music Group)
- Boris Grebenshchikov – Salt (2014, SoLyd Records)
- The Best of Bluegrass Underground 2 – Danse Caribe (2015, PBS Distribution)
- Esperanza Spalding – "The Ways You've Got the Love", Exposure (2017, Concord Records)
- I Only Listen to the Mountain Goats: All Hail West Texas – "Distant Stations" (2018)
