= Oh! The Grandeur =

Studio album by Andrew Bird's Bowl of Fire
- Released: August 24, 1999
- Genre: Indie rock, swing music
- Length: 54:39
- Label: Rykodisc
- Producer: Andrew Bird, Mike Napolitano

Andrew Bird's Bowl of Fire chronology
Thrills (1998)	Oh! The Grandeur (1999)	The Swimming Hour (2001)

Professional ratings
Review scores
Source	Rating
Allmusic	4/5 stars

Oh! The Grandeur is the third studio album by the American singer-songwriter Andrew Bird, and his second with the band Bowl of Fire. The first track, "Candy Shop", was recorded as a demo track for the then-upcoming Tim Robbins film, Cradle Will Rock (though the song did not appear in the film). Another track of note on this album is "Tea & Thorazine," which was inspired by Bird's autistic brother's experience with mental institutions. The song mentions a "Dr. B" and Bird identifies him in the album liner notes as Bruno Bettelheim, an early autism researcher.

The US release uses HDCD encoding, but the package is not labeled as HDCD.

== Track listing ==
All tracks are written by Andrew Bird, except where noted.

No.	Title	Writer(s)	Length
1.	"Candy Shop"		3:42
2.	"Tea & Thorazine"		4:16
3.	"Wishing for Contentment"		3:11
4.	"Wait"	Lyrics adapted from the poem Wait by Galway Kinnell	4:47
5.	"The Idiot's Genius"		2:33
6.	"Vidalia"		2:50
7.	"Beware"		4:21
8.	"Dora Goes to Town"		3:03
9.	"Feetlips"		3:05
10.	"And So..."		1:24
11.	"Coney Island Shuffle"		5:00
12.	"Respiration"		2:10
13.	"(What's Your) Angle?"		3:28
14.	"The Confession"		5:04
15.	"Beware (Reprise)" (+ Bonus track: "A Drinking Song In the Grande Style")		5:45

== Other appearances ==
- A live version of "Tea & Thorazine" appears on Fingerlings as "T'n't".
- "The Confession" was later reworked into the song "The Privateers" on the album Noble Beast.
