= Armchair Apocrypha =

Studio album by Andrew Bird
- Released: March 20, 2007
- Genres: Indie folk; folk rock; baroque pop
- Length: 48:27
- Label: Fat Possum
- Producer: Andrew Bird

Andrew Bird chronology
Andrew Bird & the Mysterious Production of Eggs (2005)	Armchair Apocrypha (2007)	Soldier On (2008)

Armchair Apocrypha is the fourth solo studio album by the American singer-songwriter Andrew Bird. It was released on March 20, 2007, through Fat Possum Records. The album features more electric guitars, a change from the more acoustic-oriented album Andrew Bird & the Mysterious Production of Eggs, though the songs are similar in character if slightly more straightforward.

== Writing and composition ==
- "Simple X" is sampled from the song "Simple Exercises" by collaborator Dosh, off his solo album Pure Trash. Lyrics, additional instrumentation and structure are provided by Bird.
- An earlier version of "Imitosis," called "I" (also called "Capital I" live) appears on his 2003 album Weather Systems.
- The song "Darkmatter" contains lyrics similar to those of the song "Sweetbreads", which can be found on the live EP Fingerlings 1.
- Both bonus tracks evolved from previous songs: "Sick of Elephants" was originally known as "Sycophantitis" and "Self-Torture" adds lyrics and incorporates the melody from the instrumental "The Water Jet Cilice" from Fingerlings 3. Haley Bonar, who opened some shows on Bird's tour, sings background vocals on four songs.
- In an interview with The A.V. Club, Bird mentioned that melodies are easier for him to write than lyrics. He was fascinated with the Scythians in 8th grade, so he challenged himself to write a song about them as a way to jump-start his songwriting process.

== Reception ==
Professional ratings
Aggregate scores
Source	Rating
Metacritic	81/100
Review scores
Source	Rating
AllMusic	4.5/5 stars
The A.V. Club	A−
Entertainment Weekly	B+
The Guardian	4/5 stars
Mojo	4/5 stars
NME	7/10
Pitchfork	7.7/10
Q	4/5 stars
Rolling Stone	3.5/5 stars
Spin	4/5 stars

The album has been given a Metacritic score of 81 out of 100 based on 31 reviews, indicating universal acclaim.

The album debuted at number 76 on the U.S. Billboard 200, selling about 11,000 copies in its first week. The album had sold over 100,000 copies by November 2008.

== Track listing ==
All tracks are written by Andrew Bird, except where noted.

No.	Title	Writer(s)	Length
1.	"Fiery Crash"		4:12
2.	"Imitosis"		4:01
3.	"Plasticities"		4:27
4.	"Heretics"		3:33
5.	"Armchairs"		7:02
6.	"Darkmatter"		5:07
7.	"Simple X"	Bird, Martin Dosh	3:36
8.	"The Supine"		0:59
9.	"Cataracts"		3:12
10.	"Scythian Empires"		4:34
11.	"Spare-Ohs"		4:07
12.	"Yawny at the Apocalypse"		3:39

Bonus tracks
No.	Title	Length
13.	"Sic of Elephants" (iTunes-album-only bonus track)	4:46
14.	"Self-Torture" (eMusic-only bonus track)	3:38

== Personnel ==
- Andrew Bird - Violin, vocals, whistling, guitar, glockenspiel
- Haley Bonar – Vocals (tracks 1, 9–11)
- Jon Davis – Bass clarinet (track 7)
- Martin Dosh – Drums, electric piano (Rhodes, Wurlitzer), other sounds
- Ben Durrant – Guitar (tracks 1, 6)
- Chris Morrissey – Bass (tracks 1, 2, 4, 6, 11)
- Kevin O'Donnell – Drums (track 4)
- Jeremy Ylvisaker – Guitar (track 10)

=== Technical personnel ===
- David Boucher – Mixing (tracks 5, 6)
- Ben Durrant – Co-producer; mixing at Pachyderm Studios, Cannon Falls, MN (tracks 1, 2, 4, 7–10, 12); recording at Crazy Beast Studio, Northeast Minneapolis (tracks 1, 2, 6–10, 12; vocals and guitars for tracks 4, 5)
- Dan Dietrich – Recording of additional tracks at Wall2Wall Recording, Chicago (tracks 4, 10)
- Martin Dosh – Additional recording (track 7)
- Tom Herbers – Mixing at Third Ear Recording, Minneapolis (tracks 3, 11); recording at Third Ear (tracks 3, 5, 11)
- Gregg Norman – Recording of basic tracks at Electrical Audio, Chicago (track 4)
- Roger Seibel – Mastering at SAE Mastering, Phoenix
- Brent Sigmeth – Mixing at Pachyderm Studios (tracks 1, 2, 4, 7–10, 12)
- Quemadura – Artwork and design
- Lynne Roberts-Goodwin – Photography (of birds)
- Cameron Wittig – Photography (of Andrew Bird)

== Charts ==
Chart (2007)	Peak position
French Albums (SNEP)	124
US Billboard 200	76
US Digital Albums (Billboard)	9
US Independent Albums (Billboard)	5
US Top Rock Albums (Billboard)	21
US Indie Store Album Sales (Billboard)	10
