= Nora O'Connor =

American, Chicago-based musician (born 1968)

- O'Connor performing at The Hideout on October 30, 2017

Background information
- Also known as: Nora O'Connor Kean
- Born: Nora O'Connor; April 2, 1968 (age 57)
- Origin: Chicago, Illinois, U.S.
- Genres: Folk, Country
- Occupation: Musician
- Instruments: Vocals, Guitar
- Years active: 1994–present
- Label: Bloodshot Records

Nora O’Connor (born April 2, 1968) is an American, Chicago-based musician. Though primarily known for her vocals, O'Connor also plays guitar and bass. For much of 2013, O'Connor toured internationally as a singer in Iron and Wine. She also records and performs with longtime collaborator, Andrew Bird. O'Connor plays bass and sings back-up for Kelly Hogan (supporting Hogan's release "I Like To Keep Myself In Pain" on ANTI- Records) and in 2010, Wilco's Jeff Tweedy enlisted O'Connor and Hogan as primary vocalists on gospel legend Mavis Staples’ Grammy Award-winning album You Are Not Alone. In the studio and on the stage, O'Connor has backed (among others) Neko Case, Jakob Dylan, The New Pornographers, The Decemberists, Archer Prewitt, John Wesley Harding, Hushdrops, Justin Roberts and Robbie Fulks.

O'Connor has released two solo CDs. The first, Cerulean Blue, was released by Uncommon Ground Coffeehouse in Chicago in 1996. The second, Til the dawn, was released by Bloodshot Records on August 24, 2004. NOTE: In 2022 Nora announced: "My new album 'My Heart' comes out October 7, 2022 on Pravda Records."

In the mid-1990s, she formed the Nora O'Connor Band, with herself on lead vocals and guitar, Lisa Wertman Crowe on bass and vocals, Tony Ventura on guitar and Mark Cameron on drums.

O'Connor has two sons, and lives in Evanston, Illinois.

== Other collaborative projects ==
- The Blacks: Five-piece insurgent country band (1993–2000)
- The Decemberists, touring band: backing vocals, guitar (2014–present)

See also Kelly Hogan§#Other projects.

== Partial discography ==
=== Solo ===
- Cerulean Blue (1996, Uncommon Ground)
- Til the Dawn (2004, Bloodshot Records)
- My Heart (October 2022, Pravda Records)

=== The Blacks ===
- Dolly Horrorshow (1998, Bloodshot Records)
- Just Like Home (2000, Bloodshot Records)
- In Sickness and Health EP (2010, 6-song digital download, Bloodshot Records)

=== Kelly Hogan ===
- I Like To Keep Myself In Pain (2014, ANTI-)

=== The Flat Five ===
- It's A World of Love and Hope (2016, Bloodshot Records)
- "The Raven", single (2017, Bloodshot Records)
- Another World (2020, Pravda Records)

=== Miscellaneous ===
- Happy – Robbie Fulks (2010, Yep Roc Records)
- You Are Not Alone – Mavis Staples (2010, ANTI-)
- Tomorrow – Hushdrops
- Me, Myself and Wine – Lady Parts (2015, Bloodshot Records)
