= Are You Serious (Andrew Bird album) =

Studio album by Andrew Bird
- Released: April 1, 2016
- Genre: Indie folk
- Length: 42:31
- Label: Loma Vista

Andrew Bird chronology
Echolocations: Canyon (2015)	Are You Serious (2016)	Echolocations: River (2017)

Singles from Are You Serious
- 1. "Capsized" Released: February 5, 2016; 2. "Left Handed Kisses" Released: February 25, 2016; 3. "Roma Fade" Released: March 11, 2016; 4. "Valleys of the Young" Released: March 25, 2016; 5. "Pulaski" Released: September 8, 2016; 6. "Are You Serious" Released: August 4, 2017

Are You Serious is the tenth solo studio album by Andrew Bird, released on April 1, 2016. The album features collaborations with Fiona Apple and Blake Mills.

== Production ==
In an interview with Bob Boilen on All Songs Considered, Bird described how getting married had changed his writing style on this album:

Knowing that you're going to be with someone for a long time definitely changes [the way you write], often because you're sitting in the same room with them as you're writing, and when you're sitting on the couch and you know it's not going to last, you might ... have to ... encrypt ... things. And when you don't have to do that anymore it might change your writing in that sense.

Fiona Apple was his first choice to appear on the single "Left Handed Kisses", and he contacted her through mutual friends. The track's recording session was, according to Bird, "a long whiskey-fueled night."

== Release ==
Are You Serious was announced on February 5, 2016, following an appearance on Conan in which Bird performed the single "Capsized." A deluxe box set of the album will also include a 10" record called "Are We Not Burning? The Devolution of Capsized", which features five additional tracks. The music video for the single "Left Handed Kisses", directed by Phil Andelman, was released on March 14, 2016, and features Bird and Apple sitting by a window and singing to each other.

== Reception ==
Professional ratings
Aggregate scores
Source	Rating
Metacritic	78/100
Review scores
Source	Rating
AllMusic	4/5 stars
The A.V. Club	(C+)
The Guardian	4/5 stars
Pitchfork	(7.2/10)
PopMatters	(8/10)

Are You Serious received generally favourable reviews from music critics, with a score of 78 out of 100 on the review aggregator website Metacritic. NPR's Bob Boilen described Are You Serious as Bird's most personal album to date, writing that "Andrew Bird's lyrics are often a kind of cryptic code, wordplay about the human condition, but on Are You Serious he reveals more about his own life including a blossoming relationship between two relative introverts and the birth of their son." NPR's Stephen Thompson wrote that, with this album, Bird's songwriting "keeps sounding warmer, sweeter, more thoughtful and approachable, while continuing to land lines that stick with you for days." Philip Cosores, writing for The A.V. Club, gave the album a lukewarm review, describing it as a slight effort on which Bird "takes no musical risks."

Are You Serious was nominated for Best Engineered Album, Non-Classical at the 59th Annual Grammy Awards, for engineers Tchad Blake and David Boucher, and mastering engineer Bob Ludwig.

=== Accolades ===
Publication	Accolade	Year	Rank
Paste	The 50 Best Albums of 2016	2016	24

== Track listing ==
=== Are You Serious ===
All songs written by Andrew Bird except "Are You Serious," written by Andrew Bird and Dan Wilson

No.	Title	Length
1.	"Capsized"	3:40
2.	"Roma Fade"	4:03
3.	"Truth Lies Low"	5:28
4.	"Puma"	3:31
5.	"Chemical Switches"	3:23
6.	"Left Handed Kisses" (featuring Fiona Apple)	3:14
7.	"Are You Serious"	3:39
8.	"Saints Preservus"	3:48
9.	"The New Saint Jude"	4:10
10.	"Valleys of the Young"	5:33
11.	"Bellevue"	2:02
Total length:		42:31

Deluxe edition only
No.	Title	Length
12.	"Shoulder Mountain"	3:32
13.	"Pulaski"	4:02
Total length:		50:05

=== Are We Not Burning? The Devolution of Capsized ===
No.	Title	Length
1.	"Trimmed and Burning"	1:26
2.	"Venetian Bedmaker"	1:08
3.	"Dying Beds"	1:07
4.	"Jackson Bedmaker"	1:20
5.	"Capsized – Sound City Version"	2:22

== Personnel ==
- Andrew Bird - vocals (1–11), violins (1–4, 6–11), whistling (2, 5, 8), guitar (3, 4, 6, 8, 10), omnichord (9)
- Blake Mills - guitar (1–11), pedal steel guitar (1), drums (2), mandolin (4), tiple (9), electric banjo (10)
- Ted Poor - drums (1–4, 6–11), percussion (1, 2, 4, 8), vibes (6), tubular bells (6)
- Alan Hampton - bass (1–4, 6–11), guitar (2, 4)
- Patrick Warren - keyboards (1, 2, 4, 7)
- Moses Sumney - vocals (1, 3)
- Bram Inscore - keyboards (2, 4, 9, 10)
- Fiona Apple - vocals (6)
- Tony Berg - guitar (8), keyboards (9)

== Charts ==
=== Album ===
Chart (2016)	Peak position
Belgian Albums (Ultratop Wallonia)	175
French Albums (SNEP)	134
US Billboard 200	50
US Top Alternative Albums (Billboard)	5
US Digital Albums (Billboard)	13
US Americana/Folk Albums (Billboard)	1
US Top Rock Albums (Billboard)	8
US Indie Store Album Sales (Billboard)	4
US Vinyl Albums (Billboard)	4

=== Singles ===
Song	Adult Alternative
"Capsized"	6
