= Sold Out (Squirrel Nut Zippers album) =

EP by Squirrel Nut Zippers
- Released: September 2, 1997
- Recorded: July 22, 1993 – March 22, 1997
- Venue: Spaceland, Hollywood; The Roxy, Atlanta
- Genre: Jazz; swing
- Length: 33:46
- Label: Mammoth
- Producer: Ken Mosher

Squirrel Nut Zippers chronology
Hot (1996)	Sold Out (1997)	Perennial Favorites (1998)

Professional ratings
Review scores
Source	Rating
AllMusic	link

Sold Out is a limited edition EP by the swing revival band Squirrel Nut Zippers that was released in 1997. The album is a collection of rare material such as live performances and other unreleased songs.

== Track listing ==
1. "St. Louis Cemetery Blues" (Mathus) – 3:32
2. "Bedlam Ballroom (Live)" (Guess) – 2:40
3. "Pallin' With Al (Live)" (Maxwell) – 2:49
4. "La Grippe (Live)" (Matthus) – 6:57
5. "I Raise Hell" (Jones) – 5:00
6. "Fell to Pieces" (Mathus) – 3:38

Hidden tracks

These appear after a period of silence on "Fell to Pieces".

1. "Pippo's Circus Theme" – 1:47
2. "Santa Claus Is Smoking Reefer" – 2:06
3. "If You Were Mine (Live)" – 3:16

== Details ==
- A studio version of "Bedlam Ballroom" later appeared on the 2000 album of the same name.
- Jingles from the Squirrel Brand Candy Company are featured after "Bedlam Ballroom" and "I Raise Hell."
- "Fell to Pieces" was reportedly recorded at the Zippers' second practice session in 1993.

== Personnel ==
- Jimbo Mathus – vocals, guitar
- Tom Maxwell – vocals, guitar, bass clarinet, baritone saxophone on "Bedlam Ballroom"
- Katharine Whalen – vocals, banjo, ukulele
- Ken Mosher – alto and baritone saxophone, bass on "St. Louis Cemetery Blues", drums on "Fell To Pieces", vocals on "St. Louis Cemetery Blues" and "Fell To Pieces"
- Je Widenhouse – trumpet
- Stu Cole – bass, vocals on "I Raise Hell"
- Chris Phillips – drums, percussion

Additional musicians

- Andrew Bird – violin on "St. Louis Cemetery Blues"
- Hawkeye [Jordan] – mandolin on "St. Louis Cemetery Blues"
- Stacy Guess – trumpet on "Bedlam Ballroom"
- Don Raleigh – bass on "St. Louis Cemetery Blues" and "Fell to Pieces"
- The band Bio Ritmo appears on "La Grippe". Bio Ritmo includes:
  - Rene Herrera – vocals
  - Matt Paddock – alto saxophone
  - Bob Miller – trumpet
  - Giustino Riccio – timbales
  - Gabo Tomasini – congas/percussion
  - Jim Thomson – percussion

Production

- Ken Mosher - producer, sound recordist on "St. Louis Cemetery Blues", "La Grippe", and "Fell to Pieces"
- Mike Napolitano - sound recordist on "St. Louis Cemetery Blues"
- Clay Walker – sound recordist on "Pallin' with Al" and "I Raise Hell"
- J.S Clark - sound recordist on "Bedlam Ballroom"
- Brent Lambert - mastering
