= Dancing with the Stars (American TV series) season 9 =

Dancing with the Stars
- Season 9
- Promotional poster for Season 9
- Hosted by: Tom Bergeron; Samantha Harris
- Judges: Carrie Ann Inaba; Len Goodman; Bruno Tonioli
- Celebrity winner: Donny Osmond
- Professional winner: Kym Johnson
- No. of episodes: 21

Release
- Original network: ABC
- Original release: September 21 – November 24, 2009

Season chronology
- ← Previous; Season 8 Next → Season 10

Season nine of Dancing with the Stars premiered on September 21, 2009, on the ABC network.

Some changes were added this season, including a larger cast and relay dances. Four new dances were introduced to complement the large cast: the bolero, lambada, two-step, and Charleston.

Singer Donny Osmond and Kym Johnson were crowned the winners, while singer Mýa and Dmitry Chaplin finished in second place, and reality star Kelly Osbourne and Louis van Amstel finished in third place.

== Cast ==
=== Couples ===
This season featured sixteen celebrity contestants. The cast was unveiled on the August 17, 2009, edition of Good Morning America. Executive producer Conrad Green confirmed to Entertainment Tonight that the season would feature three double-eliminations throughout the season. Former U.S. House Majority Leader Tom DeLay withdrew from the competition in week three; however, Debi Mazar was also eliminated on the same night, replacing the double elimination planned for week five. Pro pairings were officially announced on August 24, 2009.

Celebrity	Notability	Professional partner	Status
Ashley Hamilton	Actor & comedian	Edyta Śliwińska	Eliminated 1st on September 23, 2009
Macy Gray	R&B singer	Jonathan Roberts	Eliminated 2nd on September 23, 2009
Kathy Ireland	Model & entrepreneur	Tony Dovolani	Eliminated 3rd on September 29, 2009
Tom DeLay	U.S. House Majority Leader	Cheryl Burke	Withdrew on October 6, 2009
Debi Mazar	Film & television actress	Maksim Chmerkovskiy	Eliminated 4th on October 6, 2009
Chuck Liddell	UFC fighter	Anna Trebunskaya	Eliminated 5th on October 13, 2009
Natalie Coughlin	Olympic swimmer	Alec Mazo	Eliminated 6th on October 20, 2009
Melissa Joan Hart	Television actress	Mark Ballas	Eliminated 7th on October 27, 2009
Louie Vito	Snowboarder	Chelsie Hightower	Eliminated 8th on October 27, 2009
Michael Irvin	NFL wide receiver for the Dallas Cowboys	Anna Demidova	Eliminated 9th on November 3, 2009
Mark Dacascos	Iron Chef America chairman	Lacey Schwimmer; Anna Trebunskaya (Week 7)	Eliminated 10th on November 3, 2009
Aaron Carter	Singer & actor	Karina Smirnoff	Eliminated 11th on November 10, 2009
Joanna Krupa	Model & actress	Derek Hough; Maksim Chmerkovskiy (Week 5)	Eliminated 12th on November 17, 2009
Kelly Osbourne	Reality television personality & singer	Louis van Amstel	Third place on November 24, 2009
Mýa	Singer-songwriter & actress	Dmitry Chaplin	Runners-up on November 24, 2009
Donny Osmond	Singer & actor	Kym Johnson	Winners on November 24, 2009

=== Host and judges ===
Tom Bergeron and Samantha Harris returned as the show's co-hosts. Len Goodman, Carrie Ann Inaba, and Bruno Tonioli returned as the judges, with Baz Luhrmann appearing as a guest judge in week two. This was Samantha Harris' last season as co-host.

== Scoring chart ==
The highest score each week is indicated in bold green. The lowest score each week is indicated in italicized red.

Color key:

Winners
Runners-up
Third place
Bottom two or three
Withdrew from competition
Eliminated

Dancing with the Stars (season 9) - Weekly scores
Couple	Pl.	Week										
Couple	Pl.	1	2	3	4	5	6	7	8	9	10	
Couple	Pl.	1	2	3	4	5	6	7	8	9	Night 1	Night 2
Donny & Kym	1st	20+10=30	25	21	24	**29**†	24+7=31	24+28=52	26+24=50‡	21+26+27=74‡	27+28+30=85	+30=**115**† (Note: This couple finished in first place.)
Mýa & Dmitry	2nd	21+10=31	**27**†	**27**†	**28**†	27	24+9=33	25+24=49	29+30=**59**†	28+30+29=**87**†	30+30+27=**87**†	+28=**115**† (Note: This couple finished in second place.)
Kelly & Louis	3rd	23+8=31	19	20	23	24	20+5=25	24+28=52	25+26=51	24+27+27=78	26+26+24=76‡	+26=102‡ (Note: This couple finished in third place.)
Joanna & Derek	4th	24+10=**34**†	20	23	26	24	26+10=**36**†	27+28=**55**†	23+29=52	27+27+27=81 (Note: This couple was eliminated.)		
Aaron & Karina	5th	22+10=32	**27**†	21	18 (Note: This couple was in the bottom two or three, but was not eliminated.)	24	25+8=33	29+24=53	23+27=50‡			
Mark & Lacey	6th	21+8=29	21	18	22	26	26+6=32	19+24=43‡				
Michael & Anna D.	7th	13+6=19‡	20	14‡	16‡	21‡	20+2=22‡	23+24=47				
Louie & Chelsie	8th	19+8=27	19	20	16‡	22	21+3=24					
Melissa & Mark	9th	18+6=24	19	19	**28**†	23	20+4=24					
Natalie & Alec	10th	19+8=27	21	26	24	22						
Chuck & Anna T.	11th	16+6=22	19	17	17							
Debi & Maks	12th	16+6=22	21	17								
Tom & Cheryl	13th	16+4=20	18‡	15 (Note: This couple withdrew from the competition.)								
Kathy & Tony	14th	16+4=20	18‡									
Macy & Jonathan	15th	15+4=19‡										
Ashley & Edyta	16th	15+4=19‡										

== Weekly scores ==
Individual judges scores in charts below (given in parentheses) are listed in this order from left to right: Carrie Ann Inaba, Len Goodman, Bruno Tonioli.

=== Week 1 ===
The couples had to prepare two dances (either the cha-cha-cha or foxtrot, and the salsa or Viennese waltz) dividing themselves between men and women. The men performed on the first night and the women on the second night. On the first night, the men performed either the cha-cha-cha or foxtrot, and then participated in either a salsa or Viennese waltz relay. The judges ranked the couples in each relay. On the second night, the women performed either the salsa or Viennese waltz, and then participated in either a cha-cha-cha or foxtrot relay. One couple was eliminated at the end of each night. Couples are listed in the order they performed.

Tom DeLay was reported as having a possible stress fracture in his foot on September 15, just one week before the competition. However, the injury did not keep him out of the competition. Additionally, Mýa had to go to the hospital for stitches on September 20 after a glass shattered in her hand. This injury did not affect her performance. After the show, Debi Mazar was taken to the hospital with a torn muscle in her neck and chest.

Night 1 (Men)

Couple	Scores	Dance	Music	Result
Aaron & Karina	22 (7, 8, 7)	Cha-cha-cha	"Beggin'" — Madcon	Safe
Chuck & Anna T.	16 (6, 5, 5)	Foxtrot	"That's Life" — Frank Sinatra	Safe
Mark & Lacey	21 (7, 7, 7)	Cha-cha-cha	"Kung Fu Fighting" — Carl Douglas	Safe
Ashley & Edyta	15 (5, 6, 4)	Foxtrot	"Grace Kelly" — Mika	Eliminated
Donny & Kym	20 (7, 6, 7)	Foxtrot	"All That Jazz" — Kander and Ebb	Safe
Louie & Chelsie	19 (6, 7, 6)	Foxtrot	"It's My Life" — No Doubt	Safe
Michael & Anna D.	13 (5, 4, 4)	Cha-cha-cha	"I Got You (I Feel Good)" — James Brown	Safe
Tom & Cheryl	16 (6, 5, 5)	Cha-cha-cha	"Wild Thing" — The Troggs	Safe
Donny & Kym	10	Salsa Relay	"Get Busy" — Sean Paul	
Louie & Chelsie	8	Salsa Relay	"Get Busy" — Sean Paul	
Chuck & Anna T.	6	Salsa Relay	"Get Busy" — Sean Paul	
Ashley & Edyta	4	Salsa Relay	"Get Busy" — Sean Paul	
Aaron & Karina	10	Viennese waltz Relay	"I'm Your Man" — Leonard Cohen	
Mark & Lacey	8	Viennese waltz Relay	"I'm Your Man" — Leonard Cohen	
Michael & Anna D.	6	Viennese waltz Relay	"I'm Your Man" — Leonard Cohen	
Tom & Cheryl	4	Viennese waltz Relay	"I'm Your Man" — Leonard Cohen	

Night 2 (Women)

Couple	Scores	Dance	Music	Result
Debi & Maks	16 (6, 5, 5)	Salsa	"Complicación" — Tito Puente	Safe
Melissa & Mark	18 (6, 6, 6)	Viennese waltz	"The Time of My Life" — David Cook	Safe
Mýa & Dmitry	21 (8, 5, 8)	Viennese waltz	"Vision of Love" — Mariah Carey	Safe
Kathy & Tony	16 (6, 5, 5)	Salsa	"Mambo Gozón" — Tito Puente	Safe
Natalie & Alec	19 (7, 6, 6)	Salsa	"1+1=2" — Lou Bega	Safe
Macy & Jonathan	15 (6, 4, 5)	Viennese waltz	"(You Make Me Feel Like) A Natural Woman" — Aretha Franklin	Eliminated
Joanna & Derek	24 (8, 8, 8)	Salsa	"Meddle" — Little Boots	Safe
Kelly & Louis	23 (7, 8, 8)	Viennese waltz	"Trouble" — Ray LaMontagne	Safe
Joanna & Derek	10	Foxtrot Relay	"The Best Is Yet to Come" — Michael Bublé	
Natalie & Alec	8	Foxtrot Relay	"The Best Is Yet to Come" — Michael Bublé	
Debi & Maks	6	Foxtrot Relay	"The Best Is Yet to Come" — Michael Bublé	
Kathy & Tony	4	Foxtrot Relay	"The Best Is Yet to Come" — Michael Bublé	
Mýa & Dmitry	10	Cha-cha-cha; Relay	"Centerfold" — The J. Geils Band	
Kelly & Louis	8	Cha-cha-cha; Relay	"Centerfold" — The J. Geils Band	
Melissa & Mark	6	Cha-cha-cha; Relay	"Centerfold" — The J. Geils Band	
Macy & Jonathan	4	Cha-cha-cha; Relay	"Centerfold" — The J. Geils Band	

=== Week 2 ===
Each couple performed either the jive, quickstep, or tango. Couples are listed in the order they performed.

During rehearsal on September 28, Lacey Schwimmer "severely strained" her hip flexors and abductors. Her injuries required three weeks of physical therapy, though she continued to dance on the show during her treatments.

Couple	Scores	Dance	Music	Result
Joanna & Derek	20 (6, 7, 7)	Jive	"What I Like About You" — Lillix	Safe
Natalie & Alec	21 (7, 7, 7)	Quickstep	"I Want You Back" — The Jackson 5	Safe
Chuck & Anna T.	19 (6, 7, 6)	Tango	"Seven Nation Army" — The White Stripes	Safe
Melissa & Mark	19 (7, 6, 6)	Jive	"Long Tall Sally" — Little Richard	Safe
Michael & Anna D.	20 (7, 7, 6)	Quickstep	"Too Darn Hot" — Buddy Greco	Safe
Debi & Maks	21 (7, 7, 7)	Tango	"El Tango de Roxanne" — José Feliciano, Ewan McGregor & Jacek Koman	Bottom two
Louie & Chelsie	19 (6, 7, 6)	Jive	"Crash" — The Primitives	Safe
Aaron & Karina	27 (9, 9, 9)	Quickstep	"The Muppet Show Theme" — Jim Henson & Sam Pottle	Safe
Kelly & Louis	19 (6, 7, 6)	Tango	"Take Me on the Floor" — The Veronicas	Safe
Kathy & Tony	18 (6, 6, 6)	Quickstep	"Shall We Dance?" — from The King and I	Eliminated
Mark & Lacey	21 (7, 7, 7)	Quickstep	"King of Swing" — Big Bad Voodoo Daddy	Safe
Mýa & Dmitry	27 (9, 9, 9)	Jive	"Would You...?" — Touch and Go	Safe
Tom & Cheryl	18 (6, 6, 6)	Tango	"Por una Cabeza" — The Tango Project	Safe
Donny & Kym	25 (8, 9, 8)	Jive	"Secret Agent Man" — Johnny Rivers	Safe

=== Week 3 ===
Each couple performed either the rumba or samba. Couples are listed in the order they performed.

Tom Bergeron announced that the slight fracture that had plagued Tom DeLay earlier had become a full fracture, and DeLay later reported that he had stress fractures in both feet, and could not continue the competition. On the results episode, DeLay formally announced that he could not continue as a contestant. Despite his withdrawal, Debi Mazar was also still eliminated.

Couple	Scores	Dance	Music	Result
Mark & Lacey	18 (6, 6, 6)	Rumba	"Don't Lie" — The Black Eyed Peas	Safe
Joanna & Derek	23 (7, 8, 8)	Samba	"La Bomba" — King Africa	Safe
Mýa & Dmitry	27 (10, 7, 10)	Rumba	"Underneath Your Clothes" — Shakira	Safe
Melissa & Mark	19 (6, 6, 7)	Samba	"Turn Me On" — Kevin Lyttle	Safe
Louie & Chelsie	20 (8, 5, 7)	Rumba	"Total Eclipse of the Heart" — Bonnie Tyler	Safe
Debi & Maks	17 (6, 5, 6)	Samba	"Love Is in the Air" — John Paul Young	Eliminated
Donny & Kym	21 (7, 7, 7)	Rumba	"Endless Love" — Lionel Richie & Diana Ross	Safe
Michael & Anna D.	14 (5, 4, 5)	Samba	"Hard to Handle" — The Black Crowes	Bottom two
Natalie & Alec	26 (9, 8, 9)	Rumba	"In the Air Tonight" — Phil Collins	Safe
Chuck & Anna T.	17 (6, 5, 6)	Samba	"Mas que Nada" — Sérgio Mendes	Safe
Aaron & Karina	21 (8, 6, 7)	Rumba	"Spotlight" — Jennifer Hudson	Safe
Tom & Cheryl	15 (6, 4, 5)	Samba	"Why Can't We Be Friends?" — War	Withdrew
Kelly & Louis	20 (7, 6, 7)	Samba	"LoveGame" — Lady Gaga	Safe

=== Week 4 ===
Each couple performed either the bolero, Charleston, lambada, or two-step. Couples are listed in the order they performed.

Couple	Scores	Dance	Music	Result
Chuck & Anna T.	17 (6, 5, 6)	Two-step	"Boot Scootin' Boogie" — Brooks and Dunn	Eliminated
Melissa & Mark	28 (9, 9, 10)	Charleston	"Charleston" — Bob Wilson and his Varsity Rhythm Boys	Safe
Natalie & Alec	24 (8, 8, 8)	Bolero	"Better in Time" — Leona Lewis	Safe
Aaron & Karina	18 (6, 6, 6)	Lambada	"Dr. Beat" — Gloria Estefan	Bottom two
Mark & Lacey	22 (8, 7, 7)	Two-step	"Nothin' Better to Do" — LeAnn Rimes	Safe
Kelly & Louis	23 (8, 7, 8)	Charleston	"Cabaret" — Liza Minnelli	Safe
Joanna & Derek	26 (9, 8, 9)	Lambada	"Dançando Lambada" — Kaoma	Safe
Donny & Kym	24 (8, 8, 8)	Charleston	"Put a Lid on It" — Squirrel Nut Zippers	Safe
Michael & Anna D.	16 (5, 6, 5)	Bolero	"One Day I'll Fly Away" — Randy Crawford	Safe
Louie & Chelsie	16 (5, 5, 6)	Two-step	"Sweet Home Alabama" — Lynyrd Skynyrd	Safe
Mýa & Dmitry	28 (10, 8, 10)	Lambada	"Ain't It Funny" — Jennifer Lopez	Safe

=== Week 5 ===
Each couple performed either the Argentine tango or the paso doble, plus a group hustle. Couples are listed in the order they performed.

Maksim Chmerkovskiy performed with Joanna Krupa, because Derek Hough was out with the flu. Additionally, Kelly Osbourne was taken to the hospital with a foot injury sustained during her routine.

Couple	Scores	Dance	Music	Result
Natalie & Alec	22 (7, 8, 7)	Paso doble	"American Woman" — The Guess Who	Eliminated
Aaron & Karina	24 (8, 8, 8)	Argentine tango	"Epoca" — Gotan Project	Bottom two
Michael & Anna D.	21 (7, 7, 7)	Paso doble	"Les toreadors" — Semyon Bychkov & Orchestre de Paris	Safe
Mýa & Dmitry	27 (9, 9, 9)	Argentine tango	"They" — Jem	Safe
Mark & Lacey	26 (9, 9, 8)	Paso doble	"Diablo Rojo" — Rodrigo y Gabriela	Safe
Donny & Kym	29 (10, 9, 10)	Argentine tango	"Tango a Pugliese" — Orquesta Color Tango de Roberto Alvarez	Safe
Louie & Chelsie	22 (7, 8, 7)	Argentine tango	"Sin Rumbo" — Otros Aires	Safe
Melissa & Mark	23 (8, 8, 7)	Argentine tango	"Tango Barbaro" — Lalo Schifrin	Safe
Kelly & Louis	24 (8, 8, 8)	Paso doble	"Crazy Train" — Ozzy Osbourne	Safe
Joanna & Maks	24 (8, 8, 8)	Argentine tango	"Whatever Lola Wants (Gotan Project remix)" — Sarah Vaughan	Safe
Aaron & Karina Donny & Kym Joanna & Maks Kelly & Louis Louie & Chelsie Mark & Lacey Melissa & Mark Michael & Anna D. Mýa & Dmitry Natalie & Alec	No scores received	Group; Hustle	"The Hustle" — Van McCoy	

=== Week 6 ===
Each couple performed either the jitterbug or waltz, as well as a mambo relay. After the lowest-scoring couple was eliminated, the other two couples in the bottom three competed against each other in a dance-off to determine which would also be eliminated. Couples are listed in the order they performed.

Couple	Scores	Dance	Music	Result
Mýa & Dmitry	24 (8, 7, 9)	Jitterbug	"C'mon Everybody" — Eddie Cochran	Safe
Melissa & Mark	20 (7, 7, 6)	Waltz	"Only One Road" — Celine Dion	Eliminated
Mark & Lacey	26 (9, 9, 8)	Jitterbug	"This Cat's On a Hot Tin Roof" — Brian Setzer Orchestra	Safe
Aaron & Karina	25 (8, 9, 8)	Waltz	"Three Times a Lady" — The Commodores	Safe
Michael & Anna D.	20 (6, 8, 6)	Waltz	"I Wonder Why" — Curtis Stigers	Bottom three
Kelly & Louis	20 (7, 6, 7)	Jitterbug	"Bread and Butter" — The Newbeats	Safe
Louie & Chelsie	21 (7, 7, 7)	Jitterbug	"Baby Likes to Rock It" — The Tractors	Bottom three
Joanna & Derek	26 (8, 9, 9)	Waltz	"Be Here to Love Me" — Norah Jones	Safe
Donny & Kym	24 (8, 8, 8)	Jitterbug	"Choo Choo Ch'Boogie" — Indigo Swing	Safe
Michael & Anna D.	2	Mambo; Relay	"Ran Kan Kan" — Tito Puente	
Louie & Chelsie	3	Mambo; Relay	"Ran Kan Kan" — Tito Puente	
Melissa & Mark	4	Mambo; Relay	"Ran Kan Kan" — Tito Puente	
Kelly & Louis	5	Mambo; Relay	"Ran Kan Kan" — Tito Puente	
Mark & Lacey	6	Mambo; Relay	"Ran Kan Kan" — Tito Puente	
Donny & Kym	7	Mambo; Relay	"Ran Kan Kan" — Tito Puente	
Aaron & Karina	8	Mambo; Relay	"Ran Kan Kan" — Tito Puente	
Mýa & Dmitry	9	Mambo; Relay	"Ran Kan Kan" — Tito Puente	
Joanna & Derek	10	Mambo; Relay	"Ran Kan Kan" — Tito Puente	

Dance-off
Couple	Dance	Music	Result
Michael & Anna D.	Samba	"Express Yourself" — Charles Wright & the Watts 103rd Street Rhythm Band	Safe
Louie & Chelsie	Jive	"I Fought the Law" — The Clash	Eliminated

=== Week 7 ===
Each couple performed one unlearned dance, and either a team paso doble or team tango. After the lowest-scoring couple was eliminated, the other two couples in the bottom three competed against each other in a dance-off to determine which would also be eliminated. Couples are listed in the order they performed.

Anna Trebunskaya performed with Mark Dacascos, because Lacey Schwimmer was also out with an illness.

Couple	Scores	Dance	Music	Result
Michael & Anna D.	23 (8, 8, 7)	Foxtrot	"Sunny Afternoon" — The Kinks	Eliminated
Donny & Kym	24 (8, 8, 8)	Quickstep	"Sing, Sing, Sing (With a Swing)" — Andrews Sisters	Safe
Mark & Anna T.	19 (6, 7, 6)	Samba	"Switch" — Will Smith	Bottom three
Mýa & Dmitry	25 (9, 7, 9)	Foxtrot	"Is You Is or Is You Ain't My Baby" — Dinah Washington	Safe
Aaron & Karina	29 (9, 10, 10)	Jive	"We're Not Gonna Take It" — Twisted Sister	Bottom three
Kelly & Louis	24 (8, 8, 8)	Salsa	"Good Lovin'" — The Young Rascals	Safe
Joanna & Derek	27 (9, 9, 9)	Rumba	"The Look of Love" — Diana Krall	Safe
Aaron & Karina Mark & Anna T. Michael & Anna D. Mýa & Dmitry	24 (8, 8, 8)	Team; Paso doble	"I Hate Myself for Loving You" — Joan Jett	
Donny & Kym Joanna & Derek Kelly & Louis	28 (9, 9, 10)	Team Tango	"You Give Love a Bad Name" — Bon Jovi	

Dance-off
Couple	Dance	Music	Result
Mark & Anna T.	Cha-cha-cha	"I Like to Move It" — will.i.am	Eliminated
Aaron & Karina	Jive	"Mess Around" — Ray Charles	Safe

=== Week 8 ===
Each couple performed two unlearned dances, the second of which had to reflect the style of a particular era. Couples are listed in the order they performed.

Couple	Scores	Dance	Era	Music	Result
Mýa & Dmitry	29 (9, 10, 10)	Quickstep		"Baby Wants a Diamond Ring" — Squirrel Nut Zippers	Safe
Mýa & Dmitry	30 (10, 10, 10)	Samba	1970s	"Bad Girls" — Donna Summer	Safe
Aaron & Karina	23 (7, 8, 8)	Foxtrot		"Lucky" — Jason Mraz & Colbie Caillat	Eliminated
Aaron & Karina	27 (9, 9, 9)	Samba	1990s	"Two Princes" — Spin Doctors	Eliminated
Joanna & Derek	23 (8, 7, 8)	Quickstep		"Valerie" — Mark Ronson, feat. Amy Winehouse	Safe
Joanna & Derek	29 (9, 10, 10)	Paso doble	Futuristic	"Living on Video" — Trans-X	Safe
Kelly & Louis	25 (8, 8, 9)	Foxtrot		"Mama Do (Uh Oh Uh Oh)" — Pixie Lott	Safe
Kelly & Louis	26 (8, 9, 9)	Jive	1960s	"River Deep – Mountain High" — Ike & Tina Turner	Safe
Donny & Kym	26 (9, 8, 9)	Viennese waltz		"You Don't Know Me" — Ray Charles	Safe
Donny & Kym	24 (8, 8, 8)	Paso doble	1980s	"You Spin Me Round (Like a Record)" — Dead or Alive	Safe

=== Week 9 ===
Each couple performed three dances. Couples are listed in the order they performed.

Couple	Scores	Dance	Music	Result
Donny & Kym	21 (7, 7, 7)	Tango	"Black and Gold" — Sam Sparro	Safe
Donny & Kym	26 (8, 9, 9)	Samba	"One Bad Apple" — The Osmonds	Safe
Donny & Kym	27 (9, 9, 9)	Jitterbug	"Jump Shout Boogie" — Barry Manilow	Safe
Joanna & Derek	27 (9, 9, 9)	Viennese waltz	"Hallelujah" — Leonard Cohen	Eliminated
Joanna & Derek	27 (9, 9, 9)	Cha-cha-cha	"Can't Get You Out of My Head" — Kylie Minogue	Eliminated
Joanna & Derek	27 (9, 9, 9)	Salsa	"La Luz del Ritmo" — Los Fabulosos Cadillacs	Eliminated
Kelly & Louis	24 (8, 8, 8)	Rumba	"Angels" — Robbie Williams	Safe
Kelly & Louis	27 (9, 9, 9)	Quickstep	"99 Red Balloons" — Nena	Safe
Kelly & Louis	27 (9, 9, 9)	Cha-cha-cha	"Girls Just Want to Have Fun" — Cyndi Lauper	Safe
Mýa & Dmitry	28 (9, 9, 10)	Waltz	"Amore e Musica" — Russell Watson	Safe
Mýa & Dmitry	30 (10, 10, 10)	Salsa	"La Isla Bonita" — Madonna	Safe
Mýa & Dmitry	29 (9, 10, 10)	Cha-cha-cha	"Fire Burning" — Sean Kingston	Safe

=== Week 10 ===
Each couple performed three routines, including one megamix (featuring the Viennese waltz, samba, and jive), and a freestyle. Couples are listed in the order they performed.

Night 1

Couple	Scores	Dance	Music
Kelly & Louis	26 (9, 9, 8)	Argentine tango	"Los Vino" — Otros Aires
Kelly & Louis	24 (8, 8, 8)	Freestyle	"I Will Survive" — Gloria Gaynor
Mýa & Dmitry	30 (10, 10, 10)	Paso doble	"We Will Rock You" — Queen
Mýa & Dmitry	27 (9, 9, 9)	Freestyle	"You Can't Stop the Beat" — from Hairspray
Donny & Kym	27 (9, 9, 9)	Cha-cha-cha	"September" — Earth, Wind and Fire
Donny & Kym	30 (10, 10, 10)	Freestyle	"Back in Business"—Liza Minnelli
Mýa & Dmitry	30	Megamix (Viennese waltz, samba & jive)	"You and Me" — Lifehouse "Whenever, Wherever" — Shakira "Maniac" — Michael Sembello
Donny & Kym	28	Megamix (Viennese waltz, samba & jive)	"You and Me" — Lifehouse "Whenever, Wherever" — Shakira "Maniac" — Michael Sembello
Kelly & Louis	26	Megamix (Viennese waltz, samba & jive)	"You and Me" — Lifehouse "Whenever, Wherever" — Shakira "Maniac" — Michael Sembello

Night 2

Couple	Scores	Dance	Music	Result
Kelly & Louis	26	Viennese waltz	"Trouble" — Ray LaMontagne	Third place
Mýa & Dmitry	28	Jive	"Would You...?" — Touch and Go	Runners-up
Donny & Kym	30	Argentine tango	"Tango a Pugliese" — Orquesta Color Tango de Roberto Alvarez	Winners

== Dance chart ==
The couples performed the following each week:

- Week 1 (Night 1, Men): One unlearned dance (cha-cha-cha or foxtrot) & one relay dance (salsa or Viennese waltz)
- Week 1 (Night 2, Women): One unlearned dance (salsa or Viennese waltz) & one relay dance (cha-cha-cha or foxtrot)
- Week 2: One unlearned dance (jive, quickstep, or tango)
- Week 3: One unlearned dance (rumba or samba)
- Week 4: One unlearned dance (bolero, Charleston, lambada, or two-step)
- Week 5: One unlearned dance (Argentine tango or paso doble) & hustle group dance
- Week 6: One unlearned dance (jitterbug or waltz) & mambo relay
- Week 7: One unlearned dance & team dance
- Week 8: Two unlearned dances
- Week 9: Two unlearned dances & redemption dance
- Week 10 (Night 1): One unlearned dance, megamix & freestyle
- Week 10 (Night 2): Favorite dance of the season

Color key:

No scores received

Dancing with the Stars (season 9) - Dance chart
Couple	Week																			
Couple	1		2	3	4	5		6		7		8		9			10			
Couple	1		2	3	4	5		6		7		8		9			Night 1			Night 2
Donny & Kym	Foxtrot	Salsa	Jive	Rumba	Charleston	Argentine tango	Group; Hustle (Note: No scores were received for this dance.)	Jitterbug	Mambo; Relay	Quickstep	Team; Tango	Viennese waltz	Paso doble	Tango	Samba	Jitterbug	Cha-cha-cha	Megamix	Freestyle	Argentine tango
Mýa & Dmitry	Viennese waltz	Cha-cha-cha	Jive	Rumba	Lambada	Argentine tango	Group; Hustle	Jitterbug	Mambo; Relay	Foxtrot	Team; Paso doble	Quickstep	Samba	Waltz	Salsa	Cha-cha-cha	Paso doble	Megamix	Freestyle	Jive
Kelly & Louis	Viennese waltz	Cha-cha-cha	Tango	Samba	Charleston	Paso doble	Group; Hustle	Jitterbug	Mambo; Relay	Salsa	Team; Tango	Foxtrot	Jive	Rumba	Quickstep	Cha-cha-cha	Argentine tango	Megamix	Freestyle	Viennese waltz
Joanna & Derek	Salsa	Foxtrot	Jive	Samba	Lambada	Argentine tango	Group; Hustle	Waltz	Mambo; Relay	Rumba	Team; Tango	Quickstep	Paso doble	Viennese waltz	Cha-cha-cha	Salsa				
Aaron & Karina	Cha-cha-cha	Viennese waltz	Quickstep	Rumba	Lambada	Argentine tango	Group; Hustle	Waltz	Mambo; Relay	Jive	Team; Paso doble	Foxtrot	Samba							
Mark & Lacey	Cha-cha-cha	Viennese waltz	Quickstep	Rumba	Two-step	Paso doble	Group; Hustle	Jitterbug	Mambo; Relay	Samba	Team; Paso doble									
Michael & Anna D.	Cha-cha-cha	Viennese waltz	Quickstep	Samba	Bolero	Paso doble	Group; Hustle	Waltz	Mambo; Relay	Foxtrot	Team; Paso doble									
Louie & Chelsie	Foxtrot	Salsa	Jive	Rumba	Two-step	Argentine tango	Group; Hustle	Jitterbug	Mambo; Relay											
Melissa & Mark	Viennese waltz	Cha-cha-cha	Jive	Samba	Charleston	Argentine tango	Group; Hustle	Waltz	Mambo; Relay											
Natalie & Alec	Salsa	Foxtrot	Quickstep	Rumba	Bolero	Paso doble	Group; Hustle													
Chuck & Anna T.	Foxtrot	Salsa	Tango	Samba	Two-step															
Debi & Maks	Salsa	Foxtrot	Tango	Samba																
Tom & Cheryl	Cha-cha-cha	Viennese waltz	Tango	Samba																
Kathy & Tony	Salsa	Foxtrot	Quickstep																	
Macy & Jonathan	Viennese waltz	Cha-cha-cha																		
Ashley & Edyta	Foxtrot	Salsa																		

== Ratings ==
Viewership and ratings per episode of Dancing with the Stars (American TV series) season 9
No.	Title	Air date	Timeslot (ET)	Rating/share (18–49)	Viewers (millions)
1	"Episode 901"	September 21, 2009	Monday 8:00 p.m.	4.1/10	17.79
2	"Episode 901A"	September 22, 2009	Tuesday 8:00 p.m.	3.5/9	15.37
3	"Episode 901B"	September 23, 2009	Wednesday 8:00 p.m.	3.3/10	15.36
4	"Episode 902"	September 28, 2009	Monday 8:00 p.m.	3.7/9	17.03
5	"Episode 902A"	September 29, 2009	Tuesday 9:00 p.m.	2.7/7	13.02
6	"Episode 903"	October 5, 2009	Monday 8:00 p.m.	3.5/8	16.35
7	"Episode 903A"	October 6, 2009	Tuesday 9:00 p.m.	2.6/7	12.42
8	"Episode 904"	October 12, 2009	Monday 8:00 p.m.	3.6/9	16.79
9	"Episode 904A"	October 13, 2009	Tuesday 9:00 p.m.	2.9/7	13.95
10	"Episode 905"	October 19, 2009	Monday 8:00 p.m.	3.6/9	16.82
11	"Episode 905A"	October 20, 2009	Tuesday 9:00 p.m.	3.4/9	14.92
12	"Episode 906"	October 26, 2009	Monday 8:00 p.m.	3.6/9	17.38
13	"Episode 906A"	October 27, 2009	Tuesday 9:00 p.m.	3.0/7	15.20
14	"Episode 907"	November 2, 2009	Monday 8:00 p.m.	—N/a	16.69
15	"Episode 907A"	November 3, 2009	Tuesday 9:00 p.m.	—N/a	15.05
16	"Episode 908"	November 9, 2009	Monday 8:00 p.m.	3.4/8	17.62
17	"Episode 908A"	November 10, 2009	Tuesday 9:00 p.m.	3.5/9	16.23
18	"Episode 909"	November 16, 2009	Monday 8:00 p.m.	—N/a	18.84
19	"Episode 909A"	November 17, 2009	Tuesday 9:00 p.m.	—N/a	16.02
20	"Episode 910"	November 23, 2009	Monday 8:00 p.m.	4.0/10	20.41
21	"Episode 910A"	November 24, 2009	Tuesday 9:00 p.m.	4.3/12	19.29
