= The Best of Squirrel Nut Zippers as Chronicled by Shorty Brown =

Greatest hits album by Squirrel Nut Zippers
- Released: October 29, 2002
- Genre: Jazz; swing
- Label: Mammoth

Squirrel Nut Zippers chronology
Bedlam Ballroom (2000)	The Best of Squirrel Nut Zippers as Chronicled by Shorty Brown (2002)

The Best of Squirrel Nut Zippers as Chronicled by Shorty Brown is a 2002 "best of" compilation album by the swing revival band Squirrel Nut Zippers.

== Track listing ==
No.	Title	Writer(s)	Original release	Length
1.	"Good Enough for Granddad"	Mathus, Raleigh	The Inevitable	2:18
2.	"Anything But Love"	Raleigh	The Inevitable	2:40
3.	"Lover's Lane"	Mathus	The Inevitable	3:05
4.	"Memphis Exorcism"	Mathus	Hot	2:25
5.	"Prince Nez"	Mathus	Hot	2:54
6.	"Put a Lid on It"	Maxwell	Hot	2:39
7.	"Hell"	Maxwell	Hot	3:14
8.	"Flight of the Passing Fancy"	Mosher, Mathus	Hot	3:53
9.	"Low Down Man"	Mathus	Perennial Favorites	4:14
10.	"Ghost of Stephen Foster"	Mathus, Bird	Perennial Favorites	3:33
11.	"Under the Sea"	Menken, Ashman	*Previously unreleased	2:54
12.	"Suits Are Picking Up the Bill"	Mathus	Perennial Favorites	3:04
13.	"Dancing on the Moon"	Raleigh	*Previously unreleased	3:12
14.	"Pallin' With Al"	Maxwell	Perennial Favorites	2:41
15.	"The Kraken"	Maxwell	Perennial Favorites	3:57
16.	"Bedbugs"	Mathus	Bedlam Ballroom	3:11
17.	"Baby Wants a Diamond Ring"	Mathus	Bedlam Ballroom	3:26
18.	"Hush"	Mathus	Bedlam Ballroom	4:08

=== Videos ===
1. "Hell" [Multimedia Track]
2. "Put a Lid on It" (LA El Rey Version) [Multimedia Track]
3. "Put a Lid on It" (NC Version) [Multimedia Track]
