= Bedlam Ballroom =

Studio album by Squirrel Nut Zippers
- Released: October 17, 2000
- Studio: Kingsway Studios, New Orleans
- Genre: Jazz; swing
- Length: 38:14
- Label: Mammoth
- Producer: Mike Napolitano, John Plymale, Squirrel Nut Zippers

Squirrel Nut Zippers chronology
Christmas Caravan (1998)	Bedlam Ballroom (2000)	The Best of Squirrel Nut Zippers as Chronicled by Shorty Brown (2002)

Professional ratings
Review scores
Source	Rating
AllMusic	4/5 stars
The Encyclopedia of Popular Music	3/5 stars

Bedlam Ballroom is a studio album by the swing revival band Squirrel Nut Zippers, released in 2000. Following the departures of founding members Tom Maxwell and Ken Mosher, the lineup was adjusted to add piano/keyboard players Reese Gray and David Wright and saxophonist Tim Smith to the band, while bandleader Jimbo Mathus assumed the role of sole songwriter and performed all of the guitars alongside producer/engineer Mike Napolitano (who had worked with the group since their 1996 release Hot). The album reflects a stylistic shift, with the band incorporating a broader ranges of styles, instrumentation, and production approaches. The band broke up after the release of the album, eventually reuniting in 2007.

The album peaked at No. 195 on the Billboard 200.

== Critical reception ==
Exclaim! wrote that the band have "abandoned their adherence to '30s recording techniques, and though a bit of the charm is lost, thankfully these Zippers ain't slick." CMJ New Music Monthly wrote that the album finds SNZ "nearly as eclectic as ever, but more generic too." Variety thought that the album "can easily be considered their best for, if nothing else, they reclaim a time when music was unsure of itself, an era when Louis Armstrong had given up on the music of his youth to build a wider audience through pop numbers and show tunes."

== Track listing ==
All songs written by Jimbo Mathus except where noted.

1. "Bedbugs" – 3:12
2. "Baby Wants a Diamond Ring" – 3:25
3. "Do What?" – 2:42
4. "Bent Out of Shape" – 2:47
5. "Stop Drop and Roll" – 2:58
6. "Hush" – 4:12
7. "It All Depends" – 3:47
8. "Bedlam Ballroom" (Stacy Guess) – 2:15
9. "Just This Side of Blue" – 3:08
10. "Don't Fix It" – 3:33
11. "Missing Link" – 3:21
12. "Bedlam Reprise" – :21
13. "Do It This a Way" – 2:33

== Details ==
- "Bedlam Ballroom" first appeared on the band's 1997 EP Sold Out as a live recording.
- Mathus sings lead vocals on tracks 1, 3, 5, 10, and 13; Katharine Whalen sings lead on tracks 2, 4, 6, 7, and 9.
- Most editions of the CD case have a lenticular cover. The cover artwork was created by artist Michael Doret.
- Nominated for Best Recording Package at the 2002 Grammy Awards.

== Personnel ==
- Jimbo Mathus – vocals, guitar, bass guitar, Chamberlin, ukulele, banjo
- Katharine Whalen – vocals, banjo, baritone ukulele
- Tim Smith – alto, baritone, and tenor saxophones, flute, background vocals
- Reese Gray – piano, tack piano, Hammond B3 organ
- David Wright – piano, Wurlitzer, trombone, background vocals
- Je Widenhouse – trumpet
- Stuart Cole – bass guitar, background vocals
- Chris Phillips – drums, percussion, gong

Additional musicians

- Andrew Bird – violin
- Mike Napolitano – guitar
- George Rossi – piano
- Gabo Tomasini – congas
- Giustino Riccio – timbales
- Greg Humphreys – background vocals

Production

- Mike Napolitano, Squirrel Nut Zippers - producer, mixer, engineer
- John Plymale - additional production, mixing on "Bedbugs"
