= Christmas Caravan =

Studio album by Squirrel Nut Zippers
- Released: October 6, 1998
- Recorded: July 1998
- Studio: Kingsway, New Orleans; Overdub Lane, Durham, North Carolina
- Genre: Jazz; swing; Christmas
- Length: 34:10
- Label: Mammoth
- Producer: Mike Napolitano, Squirrel Nut Zippers

Squirrel Nut Zippers chronology
Perennial Favorites (1998)	Christmas Caravan (1998)	Bedlam Ballroom (2000)

Professional ratings
Review scores
Source	Rating
Allmusic	3/5 stars

Christmas Caravan is a Christmas album by the swing revival band Squirrel Nut Zippers that was released in 1998 by Mammoth Records. This was the final release from the band to feature Tom Maxwell and Ken Mosher as members, as they would leave the group the following year due to the rest of the band signing a management agreement without their knowledge.

== Track listing ==
1. "Winter Weather" (Ted Shapiro) – 2:24
2. "Indian Giver" (Jimbo Mathus) – 3:37
3. "A Johnny Ace Christmas" (Tom Maxwell) – 3:43
4. "My Evergreen" (Maxwell) – 2:35
5. "Sleigh Ride" (Leroy Anderson, Mitchell Parish) – 3:09
6. "I'm Coming Home for Christmas" (Manny Cabral, Mathus) – 3:46
7. "Carolina Christmas" (Maxwell, Ken Mosher) – 1:51
8. "Gift of the Magi" (Mathus) – 3:19
9. "Hot Christmas" (Maxwell, Mosher) – 2:35
10. "Hanging Up My Stockings" (Chester Church) – 7:11

== Personnel ==
- Jimbo Mathus
- Katharine Whalen
- Ken Mosher
- Je Widenhouse
- Chris Philips
- Stuart Cole
- Tom Maxwell

Additional musicians

- Andrew Bird – violin on "Gift of the Magi"
- Hawkeye Jordan - mandolin on "Gift of the Magi"
- Pat Sansone - piano on "Winter Weather"

Production

- Mike Napolitano - producer, mixer
- John Plymale - engineer
- Phillip Broussard and George Ortilano - additional engineering
