= Perennial Favorites =

Studio album by Squirrel Nut Zippers
- Released: August 4, 1998
- Studio: Kensway, Pittsboro, North Carolina
- Genre: Jazz; swing
- Length: 37:04
- Label: Mammoth
- Producer: Mike Napolitano, Squirrel Nut Zippers

Squirrel Nut Zippers chronology
Sold Out (1997)	Perennial Favorites (1998)	Christmas Caravan (1998)

Professional ratings
Review scores
Source	Rating
AllMusic	4/5 stars
Robert Christgau	(dud)
The Encyclopedia of Popular Music	4/5 stars
Entertainment Weekly	C−
Los Angeles Times	2.5/4 stars
MusicHound Rock: The Essential Album Guide	3.5/5 stars
Rolling Stone	3/5 stars
Spin	4/10

Perennial Favorites is an album by the swing revival band Squirrel Nut Zippers, released in 1998.

The album peaked at No. 18 on the Billboard 200. It achieved gold status.

== Production ==
The album was recorded at Ken Mosher's studio in Pittsboro, North Carolina.

== Critical reception ==
AllMusic wrote: "Part of the reason [the Zippers] stand apart from the rest of the neo-swing crowd is that they don't forget that there was a bit of menace in the days of hot jazz -- it wasn't a naive, swinging party, there was some genuine hedonism as well." Entertainment Weekly's review called the band "adept but inconsequential," writing that Katharine Whalen's "sleepy Billie Holiday cadences verge on satire." Spin called the album "self-congratulatory, jokey, essentially heartless cartoon music masquerading as 1920s 'hot jazz'." The Houston Press deemed it "a dozen rock-solid originals that represent the band's finest and most ambitious collection to date."

== Track listing ==
1. "Suits Are Picking Up the Bill" (Jimbo Mathus) – 3:04
2. "Low Down Man" (Mathus) – 4:14
3. "Ghost of Stephen Foster" (Mathus) – 3:32
4. "Pallin' with Al" (Maxwell) – 2:41
5. "Fat Cat Keeps Getting Fatter" (Mathus) – 2:47
6. "Trou Macacq" (Maxwell) – 3:17
7. "My Drag" (Mathus) – 3:27
8. "Soon" (Maxwell) – 3:02
9. "Evening at Lafitte's" (Mathus) – 2:48
10. "The Kraken" (Maxwell) – 3:40
11. "That Fascinating Thing" (Mathus) – 2:43
12. "It's Over" (Mathus) – 1:49
- Hidden track: "Berceuse Tendres" – 1:16 [between tracks 11 and 12]

== Personnel ==
- Jimbo Mathus – vocals, trombone, banjo, piano, lead guitar, guitar, percussion, backing vocals
- Tom Maxwell – vocals, tenor and baritone saxophone, gong, backing vocals, clarinet, rhythm guitar
- Katharine Whalen – vocals, banjo
- Ken Mosher – alto and baritone saxophone, guitar, cymbal, Fender Rhodes
- Je Widenhouse – cornet, trumpet, backing vocals
- Stuart Cole – bass
- Don Raleigh – bass
- Chris Phillips – drums, percussion, steel drum, contraption kit, backing vocals

Additional personnel

- Andrew Bird – violin, percussion, background vocals
- Emily Laurance – harp
- Steve Watson – pedal steel
- Rick Lassiter – bass
- Jay Faires – executive producer
- Steve Balcom – executive producer
- Clay Walker – Enhanced CD Design, Multimedia Producer, Photography, Video Editor, Video Producer
