= Plan B Productions =

Movie production company

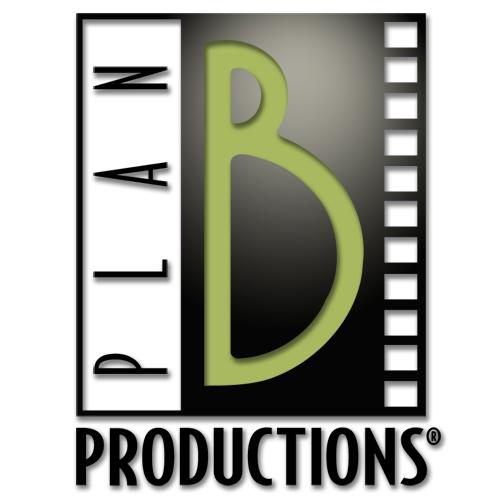
Plan B Productions color logo

Plan B Productions is a motion picture production company founded in the mid-1990s by filmmaker Clay Walker. Recent film projects include the documentary on musician Freddy Cole titled "The Cole Nobody Knows" and artist Robbie Conal titled "Post No Bills".

Plan B Productions is not affiliated with Plan B Entertainment, a separate film production company founded by Brad Grey and Brad Pitt.
