= Freddy Cole Sings Mr. B =

Studio album by Freddy Cole
- Released: 2010
- Genre: Vocal jazz
- Label: HighNote

Freddy Cole chronology
| The Dreamer in Me: Live at Dizzy's Club Coca-Cola (2009) | Freddy Cole Sings Mr. B (2010) | Talk to Me (2011) |

Freddy Cole Sings Mr. B is a 2010 tribute album by American jazz musician, Freddy Cole, released in 2010 on HighNote Records.

The album is a tribute to bebop pioneer Billy Eckstine. In 2011 it was recognized with a Grammy nomination for 'Best Jazz Vocal Album' at the 53rd Annual Grammy Awards.

The album received attention both for the subject of its tribute and for the performances.

== Reception ==
John McDonough assigned the album 4 stars in his DownBeat review. He wrote, "Cole’s chamber style is intimate and chatty on the ballads, amiable and swinging as a soft-shoe elsewhere". McDonough singled out “Tender is The Night”, “The High And The Mighty”, and “Ma, She’s Making Eyes At Me.”

AllMusic assigned 3.5 stars. Jeff Tamarkin wrote, "The influence of Eckstine upon Cole has been significant and well documented . . . Overall, Cole succeeds in his mission to remind us of the greatness of Billy Eckstine, but at the same time he reminds us that Freddy Cole, too, is and always has been his own man".

JazzTimes reviewer Christopher Louden praised the album writing that Cole's " delivery is not just impeccable but rather profound".

Professional ratings
Review scores
| Source | Rating |
|---|---|
| DownBeat | 4/5 stars |
| AllMusic | 3.5/5 stars |

== Personnel ==
- Freddy Cole – vocals
- Randy Napoleon – guitar, arrangements
- John di Martino – piano, arrangements
- Houston Person – tenor saxophone
- Elias Bailey – bass
- Curtis Boyd – Drums
