= Michael Doret =

American designer

- Born: July 19, 1946 (age 78); New York City, U.S.
- Education: The Cooper Union
- Website: michaeldoret.com blog.alphabetsoupblog.com

Michael Nicholas Doret (born July 19, 1946) is an American designer, lettering artist, and illustrator based in Los Angeles. He has created logos, album covers, magazine covers, and art for various brands in media, advertising, and sports, including Wreck-It Ralph, the New York Knicks, MLB, TIME, Playboy, Wired, TV Guide, Kiss, Capitol Records, Columbia Records, Walt Disney Imagineering, and Universal Studios. He also designed American Eagle postage for the United States Postal Service.

== Biography ==
Doret grew up in Brooklyn, New York City, near Coney Island and is a graduate of the Cooper Union. He began his work by opening a small design studio in New York and eventually moved to Los Angeles where he lives with his wife. Along with his design studio, Doret owns AlphabetSoup Type Founders which distributes his original font designs through Font Bros., Fontshop, MyFonts and Veer.

Five TIME covers by Doret are included in the permanent collection at The National Portrait Gallery in Washington, D.C. Doret designed the logos for The Graphic Artists Guild, the New York Knicks, and many other notable institutions. He has worked extensively within the music industry, including creating two album covers for Kiss: Rock and Roll Over and Sonic Boom.

Doret is an eight-time winner of the New York Art Directors Club Silver Award. His 3D Bedlam Ballroom CD package designed for Squirrel Nut Zippers was nominated for a Grammy Award for "Best Recording Package" at the 44th Grammy Awards in 2002. His font "Deliscript" was chosen by the Type Directors Club to receive the prestigious "Certificate of Excellence in Type Design" in the display fonts category for their TDC² 2010 Typeface Design Competition. His serigraph for PowerStation was a Graphis Gold Award winner.
