= Dance Mania =

Dance Mania may refer to:

- Dance Mania (record label), a Chicago record label
- Dance Mania (album), a 1958 album by Tito Puente

== See also ==
- Dancing mania, the phenomenon of large groups of people dancing for no clear reason
- Dancemania, a series of remix compilation albums
- Dance Fever
