= The Inevitable (album) =

Studio album by Squirrel Nut Zippers
- Released: 1995
- Studios: Wavecastle, North Carolina
- Genres: Jazz; swing
- Length: 34:44
- Label: Mammoth
- Producer: Brian Paulson

Squirrel Nut Zippers chronology
Roasted Right (1994)	The Inevitable (1995)	Hot (1996)

The Inevitable is the first album by the Squirrel Nut Zippers, released in 1995.

== Critical reception ==
Professional ratings
Review scores
Source	Rating
AllMusic	4/5 stars

Trouser Press wrote: "Vic Godard, Brian Setzer and other modern nostalgists have tiptoed through these tulips before, but none with the straight-faced charm lofted by this merry bunch of coconuts."

== Track listing ==
1. "Lover's Lane" (Jimbo Mathus) – 3:03
2. "Danny Diamond" (Ken Mosher) – 3:49
3. "I've Found a New Baby" (Jack Palmer, Spencer Williams) – 2:42
4. "Anything but Love" (Don Raleigh) – 2:38
5. "Good Enough for Granddad" (Mathus, Raleigh) – 2:17
6. "Wished for You" (Mathus) – 2:14
7. "La Grippe" (Mathus) – 3:10
8. "Lugubrious Whing Whang" (Mathus) – 2:38
9. "Club Limbo" (Tom Maxwell) – 2:56
10. "Wash Jones" (Mathus) – 3:04
11. "You're Driving Me Crazy" (Walter Donaldson) – 2:46
12. "Plenty More" (Maxwell) – 3:27

== Personnel ==
- Jimbo Mathus – guitar, vocals
- Katharine Whalen – banjo, vocals
- Tom Maxwell – guitar, percussion, vocals
- Ken Mosher – guitar, alto and baritone saxophone, vocals
- Stacy Guess – trumpet
- John Kempannin – violin
- Don Raleigh – bass
- Chris Phillips – drums, percussion
- Steve Balcom – executive producer
- Jay Faires – executive producer
- Brian Paulson – engineer, mixing, producer
