= Area 4 =

Area 4 is the name of several places including:

- Area 4, Cambridge a neighborhood
- Area 4 (NTS) one of the named test areas at the Nevada Test site
- Area 4 (venue) and entertainment venue in Germany
- Brodmann area 4 an area of the brain
- Jiuquan Launch Area 4 or simply Launch Area 4
- Special Area No. 4, a special area in Alberta, Canada
