= These 13 (album) =

Studio album by Jimbo Mathus and Andrew Bird
- Released: March 5, 2021
- Studios: Hollywood Sound Recorders (Los Angeles, California); Barebones Studios
- Genre: Americana
- Length: 44:49
- Label: Thirty Tigers
- Producer: Mike Viola

Andrew Bird chronology
Hark! (2020)	These 13 (2021)	Inside Problems (2022)

Jimbo Mathus chronology
Incinerator (2019)	These 13 (2021)

These 13 is a collaborative studio album by American musicians Jimbo Mathus and Andrew Bird. It was released on March 5, 2021, through Thirty Tigers. Recording sessions took place at Hollywood Sound Recorders in Los Angeles and at Barebones Studios. Production was handled by Mike Viola. The album peaked at number 65 on the Top Album Sales in the United States.

Mathus and Bird had previously played together in the band Squirrel Nut Zippers in the 1990s; These 13 marks their first collaboration as a duo. The album's sound references American folk music of the 1930s and 1940s, with Bird listing Charley Patton, Mississippi Sheiks and Carter Family as influences. The album's title is a reference to the 1931 short story collection of the same name by William Faulkner.

== Critical reception ==
Professional ratings
Aggregate scores
Source	Rating
Metacritic	79/100
Review scores
Source	Rating
AllMusic	4/5 stars
American Songwriter	3.5/5 stars
Flood Magazine	7/10
Paste	7.8/10
Pitchfork	7.2/10
PopMatters	7/10
Spectrum Culture	85%
Uncut	7/10
Under the Radar	7.5/10 stars

The album was met with generally favorable reviews from music critics. At Metacritic, which assigns a normalized rating out of 100 to reviews from mainstream publications, the album received an average score of 79, based on nine reviews.

== Track listing ==
All tracks are written by James H. Mathis Jr. and Andrew Bird.

These 13 track listing
No.	Title	Length
1.	"Poor Lost Souls"	4:17
2.	"Sweet Oblivion"	3:12
3.	"Encircle My Love"	3:42
4.	"Beat Still My Heart"	3:56
5.	"Red Velvet Rope"	3:14
6.	"High John"	3:51
7.	"Stonewall (1863)"	4:10
8.	"Bright Sunny South"	1:04
9.	"Bell Witch"	3:10
10.	"Dig Up the Hatchet"	2:33
11.	"Jack O' Diamonds"	2:43
12.	"Burn the Honky Tonk"	2:22
13.	"Three White Horses and a Golden Chain"	6:35
Total length:		44:49

== Personnel ==
- Andrew Bird – vocals, songwriter
- James "Jimbo Mathus" Mathis Jr. – vocals, songwriter
- Susanna Hoffs – harmony vocals (track 9)
- Michael "Mike" Viola – producer
- David Boucher – mixing
- Jeff Lipton – mastering
- Jared Spears – art direction, artwork

== Charts ==
Chart performance for These 13
Chart (2021)	Peak position
US Top Album Sales (Billboard)	65
