= Roasted Right =

EP by Squirrel Nut Zippers
- Released: 1994; October 14, 1997
- Recorded: December 15, 1993
- Genre: Dixieland; jazz; swing; blues
- Length: 10:15
- Label: Merge
- Producer: Squirrel Nut Zippers

Squirrel Nut Zippers chronology
Roasted Right (1994)	The Inevitable (1995)

Roasted Right is the debut recording by the swing revival band Squirrel Nut Zippers, first released as a 7" in 1994, and subsequently re-released with an additional track as an EP in 1997. Unlike later music by the Zippers, Roasted Right features a more blues-based sound without brass or woodwinds. The tracks "Anything But Love" and "Wash Jones" are early versions of songs later re-recorded for full-length albums.

== Track listing ==
7" Vinyl 1994 (MRG057):

1. "Little Mother-in-Law" (Whalen/Mathus) — 2:36
2. "(You Are My) Radio" (Whalen/Mathus) — 2:08
3. "Anything But Love" (Raleigh) — 2:45

CD 1997 EP (MRG 057 CD):

1. "Little Mother-in-Law" (Whalen/Mathus) — 2:36
2. "(You Are My) Radio" (Whalen/Mathus) — 2:08
3. "Anything But Love" (Raleigh) — 2:45
4. "Wash Jones" (Mathus) — 2:46

== Personnel ==
- Jimbo Mathus – guitar, slide guitar, lead vocals
- Katharine Whalen – banjo, ukulele, lead vocals
- John Kempannin – violin
- Don Raleigh – double bass
- Chris Phillips – contraption kit
- Ken Mosher – drums, vocals
