= The Cole Nobody Knows =

2006 film

- Directed by: Clay Walker
- Produced by: Clay Walker; Maxine Harvard
- Cinematography: Clay Walker
- Edited by: Clay Walker
- Music by: Freddy Cole
- Distributed by: Clay Walker; Plan B Productions
- Release date: August 23, 2006
- Running time: 21 minutes
- Country: United States
- Language: English

The Cole Nobody Knows is a documentary film about musician Freddy Cole, the younger brother of Eddie Cole, Ike Cole & Nat King Cole.

The film tells Mr. Cole's story through interviews with musicians Monty Alexander, Nancy Wilson, David “Fathead” Newman, John di Martino, H Johnson and Carl Anthony. Photographed in Atlanta, New York City, Los Angeles, Switzerland & France, “The Cole Nobody Knows” also features live performance material with Freddy Cole and his quartet.

Directed by filmmaker Clay Walker, "The Cole Nobody Knows" has been featured in over 40 international film festivals and awarded the Cine Golden Eagle Award. The film received its PBS premiere on WPSU Pennsylvania in December 2009.
