= Post No Bills =

Post No Bills may refer to:

- A sign intended to discourage unauthorized flyposting, the phrase's original meaning
- Post No Bills (1896 film), an 1896 French short black-and-white silent comedy film
- Post No Bills (1923 film), a 1923 American comedy short film, starring James Parrott
- Post No Bills (1992 film), a 1992 American documentary film
