= Clay Walker (filmmaker) =

American filmmaker (born 1968)

Clay Walker (born March 15, 1968) is an American Atlanta-based filmmaker

== Early life and education ==
Walker was born in Memphis on March 15, 1968. He first attended college at Georgia Institute of Technology as an industrial design major and then transferred to Laguardia Community College in Queens to study photography and journalism. From there he transferred to the University of Southern California's School of Cinematic Arts, where he graduated with a Bachelor of Arts in television & film production.

== Documentary Films ==
In 1992, Walker produced, directed, photographed and edited the PBS documentary Post No Bills on Los Angeles "guerrilla" satirical political poster artist Robbie Conal. Post No Bills received a Silver Hugo at the 1992 Chicago International Film Festival. Post No Bills was exhibited on PBS from 1993 – 1996 and was the first completed broadcast-hour ITVS-funded project in history.

From 1995 to 1998 Walker followed the Squirrel Nut Zippers and created various media pieces from the documentary Squirrel Nut Zippers: Musical Candy to the enhanced interactive presentations on the "Hot" & "Perennial Favorites" albums. Walker's interactive documentary on the Squirrel Nut Zippers enhanced audio CD Perennial Favorites was described by CNN Interactive as "Clay Walker's Sistine Chapel."

Walker's 2007 film The Cole Nobody Knows, the documentary film on the late jazz musician Freddy Cole, has been featured in over 30 international film festivals and awarded the Cine Golden Eagle Award.

== Professional life ==
Walker operates the film production company Plan B Productions that specializes in both independent film work and corporate video marketing pieces.

In 2006, Walker was named "best local filmmaker" by the readers of Atlanta's Creative Loafing newspaper.

== Filmography as producer, director, cinematographer and editor ==
| Year | Title | Notes |
|---|---|---|
| 1992 | Post No Bills (1992 film) | |
| 1996 | Squirrel Nut Zippers: Musical Candy | |
| 2006 | The Cole Nobody Knows | |
