= My Mood Is You =

Studio album by Freddy Cole
- Released: 2018
- Genre: Vocal jazz
- Label: HighNote

My Mood Is You is an album by Freddy Cole, released in 2018.

The album features Cole's working band, Randy Napoleon on guitar, Elias Bailey on bass, and Quentin Baxter on drums, as well as pianist John DiMartino and tenor Joel Frahm. Arrangements are by Napoleon and DiMartino. This album was nominated for a Grammy Award for Best Jazz Vocal Album on December 7, 2018.
