= Waiter, Ask the Man to Play the Blues =

Studio album by Freddy Cole
- Released: 1964
- Recorded: 1964
- Genre: Jazz
- Length: 32:33
- Label: Dot

Freddy Cole chronology
Whispering Grass (1953)	Waiter, Ask the Man to Play the Blues (1964)	The Way Freddy Cole Sings (1976)

Waiter, Ask the Man to Play the Blues is a 1964 studio album by jazz singer and pianist Freddy Cole. It was reissued in 2004 by Verve Records.

== Reception ==
Professional ratings
Review scores
Source	Rating
Allmusic	4.5/5 stars

Thom Jurek reviewed the album for Allmusic and wrote of Cole that "His tune selection is flawlessly suited to his voice, a darkling instrument with a very slight roughness in its grain. The title track features a late-night, forlorn groove with the piano punching lines as Cole's vocal effortlessly floats on top and guitars and the rhythm section whisper in the background...it's a stellar example of vocal jazz and blues with Cole's considerable gifts on full display."

In his review of the album for All About Jazz, Javier Aq Oritz wrote: "The New York recording is a product of its time, with assured long-lasting worth nonetheless. All of the cuts are short and to the point. They do, however, generate interest and radiate musicality....This release is a superb example of urban settled and cosmopolitan blues arousing affection through sheer straightforwardness even when—as expected of the blues—many of the lyrics are thematically inclined to the loneliest travails of love and life."

== Track listing ==
1. "Waiter, Ask the Man to Play the Blues" (Ted Travers, Jerry Ferber, Floyd Hunt) – 2:20
2. "Black Night" (Jessie Mae Robinson) – 2:38
3. "Rain Is Such a Lonesome Sound" (Jimmy Witherspoon) – 2:38
4. "Bye Bye Baby" (Willis) – 2:42
5. "Just a Dream" (Big Bill Broonzy) – 3:25
6. "Muddy Water Blues" (Freddie Spruell) – 2:18
7. "Black Coffee" (Sonny Burke, Paul Francis Webster) – 2:43
8. "The Joke Is on Me" (Hunt) – 2:31
9. "I Wonder" (Cecil Gant, Raymond Leveen) – 2:47
10. "This Life I'm Living" (Peter Chatman) – 2:25
11. "Blues Before Sunrise" (Leroy Carr) – 3:44
12. "I'm All Alone" (Freddy Cole) – 2:22

== Personnel ==
- Freddy Cole – piano, vocals
- Sam "The Man" Taylor – tenor saxophone
- Barry Galbraith, Wally Richardson – guitar
- Milt Hinton – double bass
- Osie Johnson – drums

Production

- Hollis King – art direction
- Sherniece Smith – art producer
- Alex de Paola – cover photo
- Ken Druker – executive producer
- Hideaki Nishimura – mastering
- Bryan Koniarz – producer
- Mark Cooper Smith – production assistant
