= Dance Fever (disambiguation) =

Dance Fever is a 1979 American musical variety series.

Dance Fever may also refer to:

- Dance Fever (2003 TV series)
- Dance Fever (album), a 2022 Florence and the Machine album
- "Dance Fever", a 2004 episode of George Lopez
- "Dance Fever!", a 1998 episode of Bear in the Big Blue House

== See also ==
- Dance Mania (disambiguation)
