= The Port, Cambridge =

Neighborhood in Cambridge, Massachusetts, United States

Coordinates: 42°22′1″N 71°5′52.″W

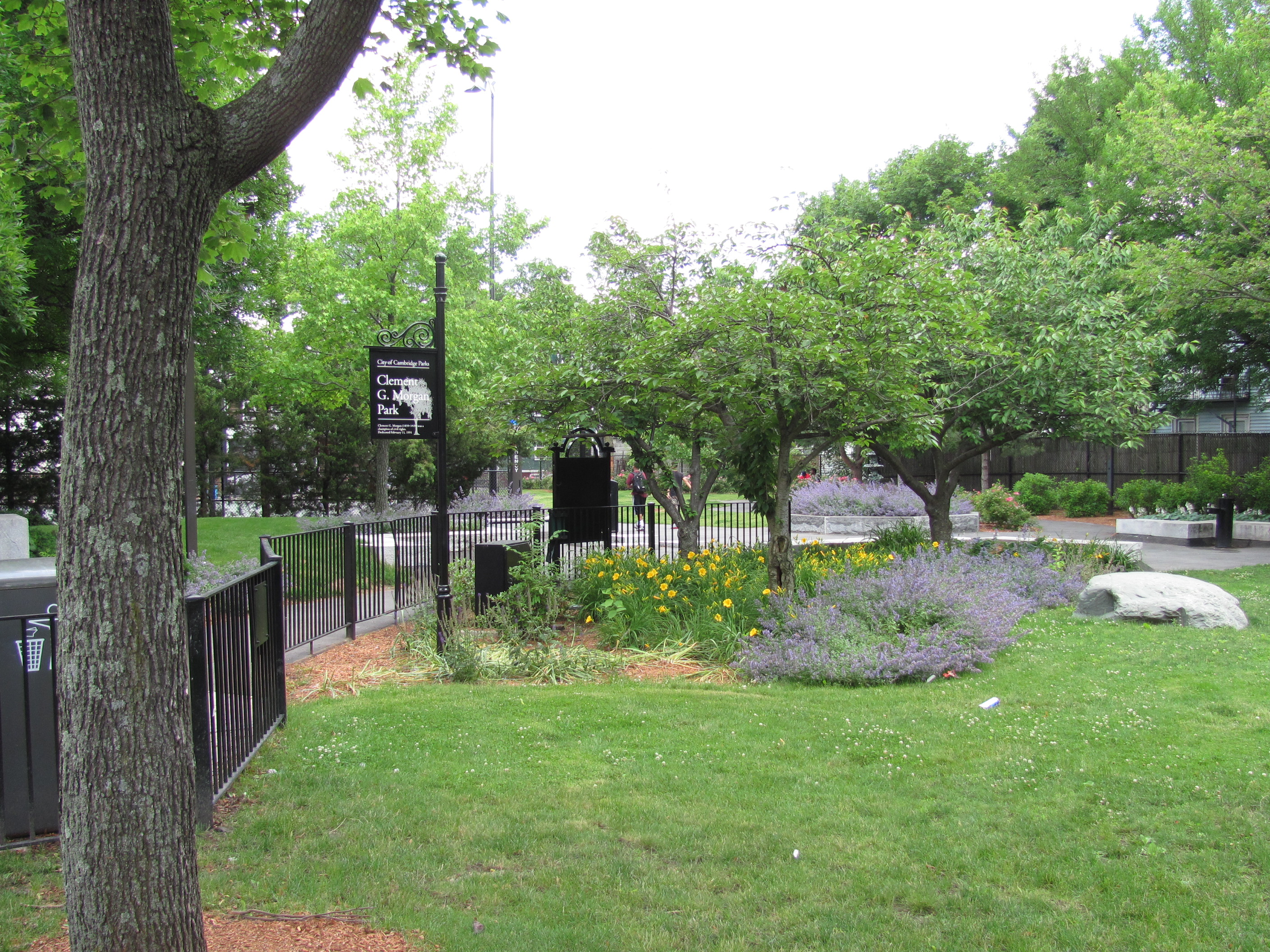
Clement G. Morgan Park

The Port, formerly Area 4, is a neighborhood of Cambridge, Massachusetts, roughly between Central Square, Inman Square, and MIT. It is bounded on the south by Massachusetts Avenue, on the west by Prospect Street, on the north by Hampshire Street, and on the east by the Grand Junction Railroad tracks. Area 4 is a densely populated residential neighborhood with about 7,000 residents.

== History and name ==
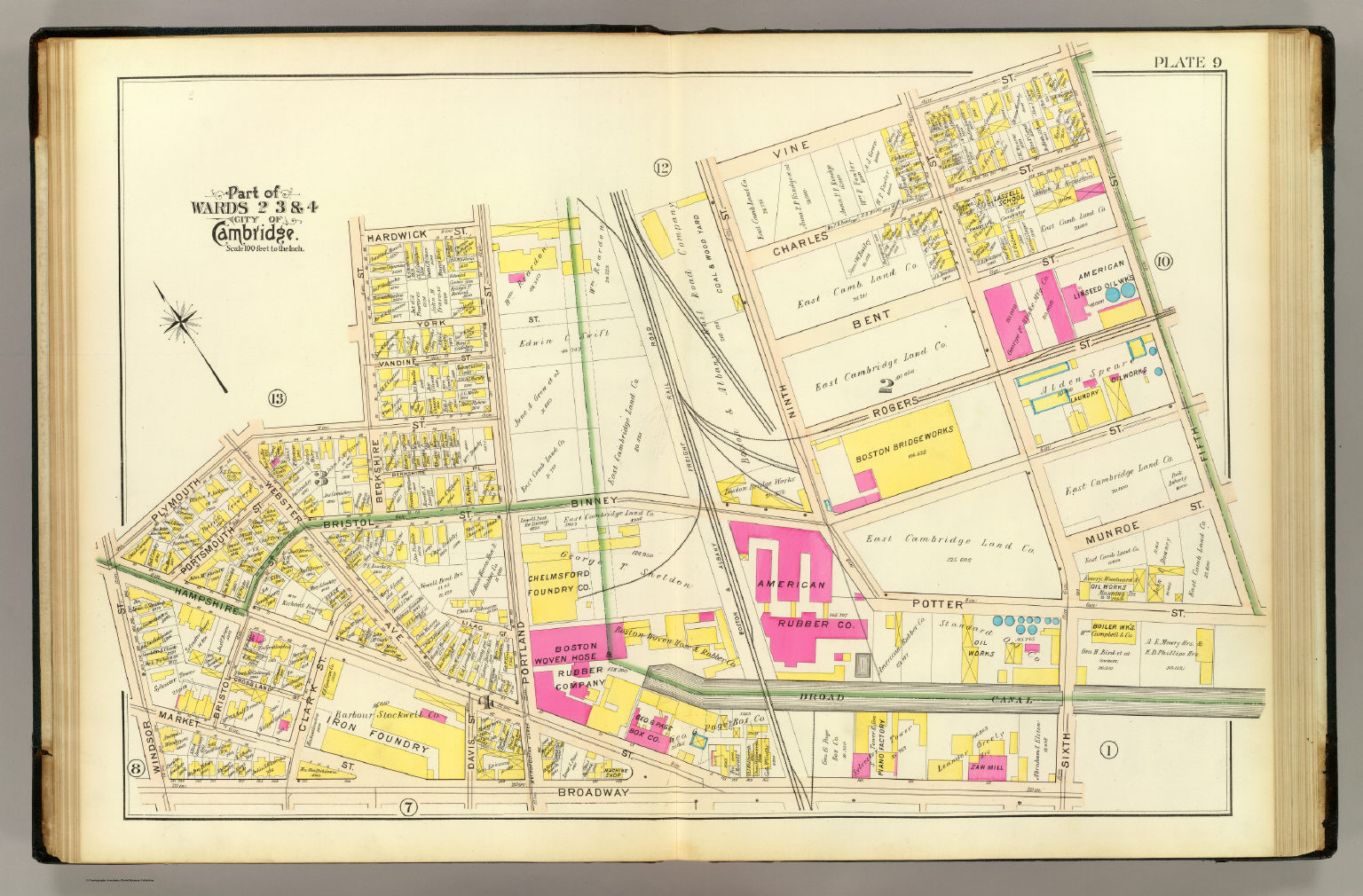
Map including the eastern end of the Port, from a 1903 atlas of Cambridge, Massachusetts

Prior to the filling in of the Charles River marshes in the late 19th century, brackish saltwater reached into the eastern and southern edges of the area known as Cambridgeport. After landfill allowed Cambridge to expand east, the former riverside area became known as the "Old Port" or simply as "the Port". The east side includes Portland Street and, in its northern industrial area, the terminus of the Broad Canal from the Charles River.

To analyze the 1950 census, Cambridge split the city into 13 statistical zones, and the old Cambridgeport neighborhood was split into two zones, Area 4 and Area 5, divided by Massachusetts Avenue. Later those census zones were rolled over into official planning districts by the Cambridge Community Development department. The "Cambridgeport" name went to Area 5, whose southern end still reached the Charles; the inland Area 4 never received an official designation, as the planning districts were never meant to define neighborhood boundaries. For decades, Area 4 was one of only two planning districts to lack an official name (the other, neighborhood nine, still lacks one). Neighborhood and other Cambridge residents continued to refer to the area as the Port.

Community organizations petitioned the Cambridge City Manager, in 2003 and 2013, to restore "The Port" as the official name of the Area 4 planning district for official documentation. On October 19, 2015, after the process had commenced the March prior, it was announced at a City Council meeting that Area 4 would officially adopt the poll-selected name, "The Port". The change was driven in great part by Vice-Mayor Dennis Benzan, who grew up in Area 4 and was crucial in ensuring that the adoptive name be selected through a community-based decision.

== Notable industries ==
Elias Howe, Jr. invented the sewing machine at 55 Cherry Street in The Port in 1846. Howe's was the first patented functional sewing machine. Isaac Singer, who made sewing machines commercially successful, was forced to pay patent royalties to Howe.

The Port was the site of the first reciprocal telephone conversation, which took place between Alexander Graham Bell and Thomas A. Watson on October 9, 1876. Watson was at an office in The Port, and Bell was at an office on Cambridge Street in Boston. A plaque commemorating this event is mounted at 710 Main Street near the Windsor Street intersection.

The Port was the early hub of the candy industry in the United States, beginning with the first candy factory in Cambridge, started by Robert Douglass in 1826 on Windsor Street. Notable candy factories in The Port included Cambridge Brands, makers of Junior Mints, still in operation on Main Street; the Squirrel Brands company, makers of Squirrel nut caramel (the inspiration for the band name Squirrel Nut Zippers); and Necco (New England Confectionery Company), whose factory located across Massachusetts Avenue from today's Port was the largest candy factory in the world.

== Notable people and places ==
Places

- The Garment District is a new and used clothing store located in a historic building. It is widely known throughout the Boston area, especially its "By the Pound" section. In 2004-2005 the store was threatened with redevelopment into condominiums, but was preserved with help by the Area 4 neighborhood coalition and a historical designation for the building by the City of Cambridge.
- Squirrel Brand Park is located on the grounds of the old Squirrel Brand candy factory.

People

- Clement G. Morgan, 1859–1929, was the first black Cambridge City Councilor and a cofounder of the Niagara Movement, a predecessor of the National Association for the Advancement of Colored People (NAACP). Morgan grew up on Columbia Street and on Prospect Street. Morgan Park in Area 4 is named after him.
- Denise Simmons, current mayor of Cambridge, lives in Area 4. She is seen as Area 4's representative to city government.

== Demographics ==
Per city data, in 2005, Area 4 had a population of 7,263 residents living in 2,523 households. The average household income was $34,306. In 2000, the racial demographics for the neighborhood were 45.9% White, 35.4% Black, 15.7% Hispanic origin, 8.2% Asian/Pacific Islander, 0.2% Native American, 7.3% other race.
