= Post No Bills (1992 film) =

1992 film by Clay Walker

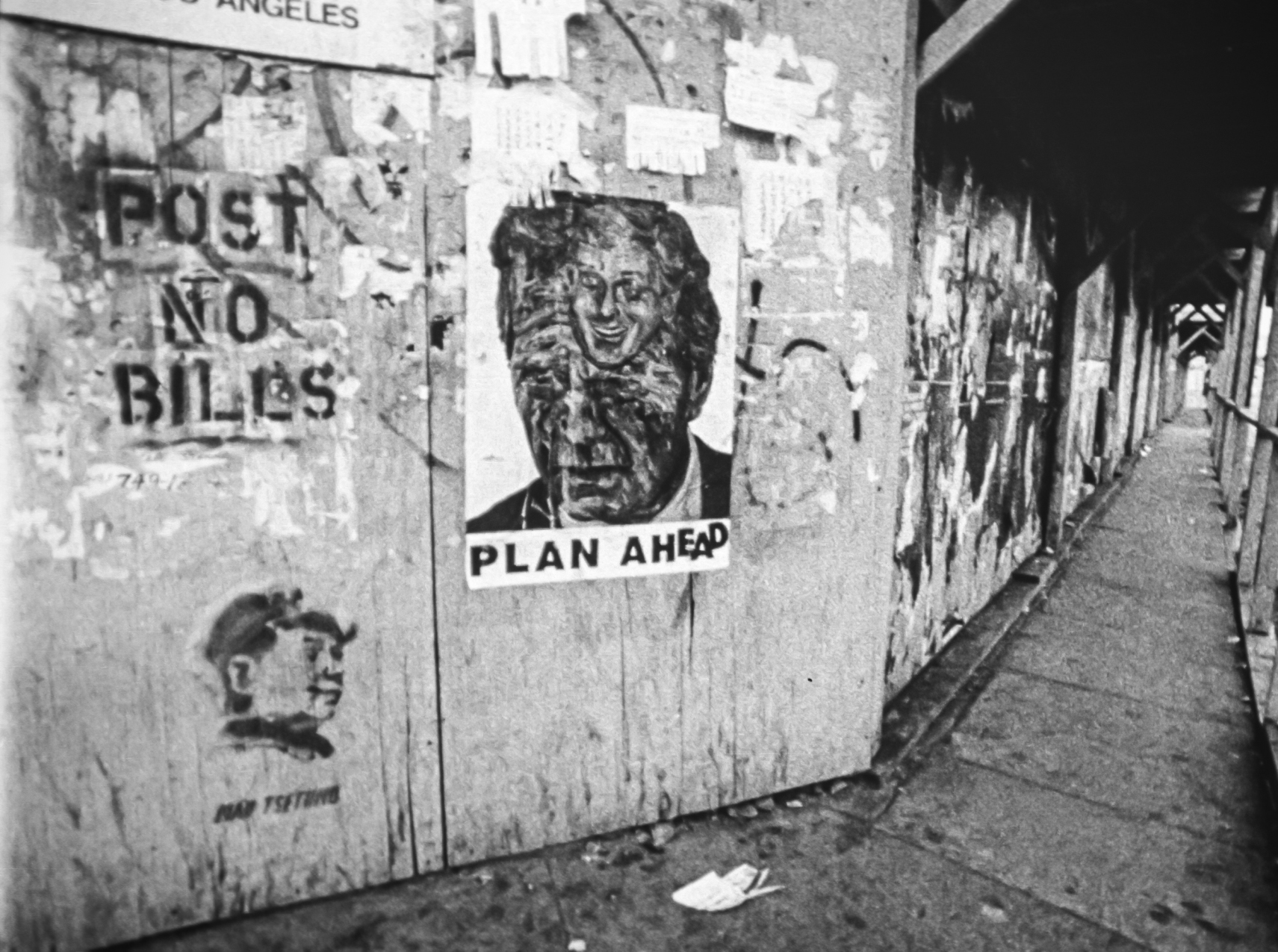
- Directed by: Clay Walker
- Produced by: Clay Walker; Marianne Dissard
- Cinematography: Clay Walker
- Edited by: Clay Walker
- Distributed by: Clay Walker; Plan B Productions
- Release date: November 9, 1992
- Running time: 57 min.
- Language: English

Post No Bills is a documentary film on satirical political poster artist Robbie Conal directed by Clay Walker. The movie's title comes from lettering found on many construction walls and other city surfaces, indicating that advertisements or handbills are not to be placed on the surface.

== Production ==
This documentary was shot on 16mm black and white filmstock in Los Angeles, New York City and San Francisco from 1990 to 1992. At the center of the film is a poster that featured LAPD Chief Daryl Gates superimposed on a NRA shooting target with the text "Casual Drug Users Ought To Be Taken Out and Beaten." The controversial posters were glued around the city of Los Angeles in March 1991 shortly after the beating of Rodney King by LAPD officers. Post No Bills documents a two-year period of Conal's painting and postering exploits capturing his rapid rise from anonymous satirist to media celebrity and contains interviews with some of the subjects of Conal's artwork including Daryl Gates and Oliver North.

== Exhibition and awards ==
Post No Bills was first publicly exhibited in October 1992 at the Cork Film Festival where it received a certificate of Merit. Several days later the Chicago International Film Festival awarded Post No Bills the Silver Hugo for feature-length documentary.

Post No Bills was the first completed broadcast hour ITVS project and was first broadcast on PBS in September 1993.

"Post No Bills" was added to the Library of Congress Catalog in 1992.
