= Hot (Squirrel Nut Zippers album) =

Studio album by Squirrel Nut Zippers
- Released: June 4, 1996
- Recorded: October–November 1995
- Genres: Jazz; swing
- Length: 38:41 (43:37)
- Label: Mammoth
- Producers: Brian Paulson, Mike Napolitano

Squirrel Nut Zippers chronology
The Inevitable (1995)	Hot (1996)	Sold Out (1997)

Singles from Hot
- 1. "Hell" Released: 1996; 2. "Put a Lid on It" Released: 1996

Hot is the second studio album by American retro swing band Squirrel Nut Zippers. Recorded as a follow-up to their acclaimed debut, The Inevitable, the group continued their use of big band sounds and tongue-in-cheek lyrics. Upon its release in June 1996, the album drew favorable reviews from most critics, who praised the humorous lyrical compositions and the record's cross-generational appeal. The album peaked within the top 30 of the Billboard 200, and was certified Platinum by the RIAA in December of the year following its release. It also spawned a single, "Hell", which peaked at No. 13 on the Alternative Airplay chart; and though it did not reach the Pop Top 50, it did manage to garner airplay on 24 pop radio stations.

== Composition ==
The album was recorded live in October 1995 using a single microphone, as an homage to old jazz records. Vocalist Katharine Whalen's vocals drew comparisons to Billie Holiday, while the group's lyrics were noted for their humor and tongue-in-cheek quality. The 20th anniversary reissue of the album featured a bonus track, "The Puffer", which had been penned by Stacy Guess, the group's former trumpeter who had left the group shortly before they recorded the album.

== Reception ==
=== Critical ===
Professional ratings
Review scores
Source	Rating
AllMusic	4/5 stars
Pitchfork	9.5/10
The Village Voice	B−

Critics' reception of the album was described by one music critic as "a combination of joy and confusion". In a review for Pitchfork, critic James P. Wisdom awarded the album a score of 9.5 out of 10, commending the record for its cross-generational appeal and its identity as "exuberant, ginhouse swing without apologies". Allmusic's Stephen Thomas Erlewine gave the album four out of five stars and praised its humor and big band sound, although conceding that the "tongue-in-cheek" lyrics and Whalen's vocals might be "unbearable" for some. He also designated the record as an "album pick" in the group's discography, and singled out "Put a Lid on It", "Hell", and "Blue Angel" as highlights.

In a less favorable review, music critic Robert Christgau, writing for the Village Voice, gave the record a letter grade of "B−". Christgau remarked that the group had "written a couple of dandy songs" but also accused the group of being "not good enough to escape" nostalgia, and criticized Whalen's vocals as resembling Holliday and Betty Boop.

=== Commercial ===
The album became the group's first entry on the Billboard 200 chart, on which it spent a total of 51 weeks and peaked at number 27 in June 1997. Prior to its entry into the upper half of the Billboard 200, the album also peaked at number one on the Heatseekers Albums chart. In May 1997, less than a year after its release, the album was certified Gold by the Recording Industry Association of America (RIAA) for sales in excess of 500,000 copies, and in December of that year it was certified Platinum for sales of over 1,000,000 copies.

The single "Hell" also attained some success, crossing over onto mainstream radio. It peaked at number 72 on the Billboard Radio Songs chart and number 13 on the Alternative Airplay chart. In popular culture, "Hell" was one of the songs sung in the 2021 Lucifer episode "Bloody Celestial Karaoke Jam". On Alternative radio, "Put A Lid On It" reached 35 stations as the followup track, but it did not quite make the Top 50.

== Track listing ==
No.	Title	Length
1.	"Got My Own Thing Now" (Jimbo Mathus)	2:30
2.	"Put a Lid on It" (Tom Maxwell)	2:39
3.	"Memphis Exorcism" (Mathus)	2:24
4.	"Twilight" (Maxwell)	3:34
5.	"It Ain't You" (Mathus)	3:08
6.	"Prince Nez" (Mathus)	2:53
7.	"Hell" (Maxwell)	3:12
8.	"Meant to Be" (Maxwell)	3:11
9.	"Bad Businessman" (Mathus, Ken Mosher)	3:48
10.	"Flight of the Passing Fancy" (Mathus, Mosher)	3:52
11.	"Blue Angel" (Mathus, Mosher)	4:35
12.	"The Interlocutor" (Mosher)	2:47

Remastered 20th Anniversary Edition (2016) Digital-Only Bonus Track:
No.	Title	Length
13.	"The Puffer" (Stacy Guess)	4:57

== Personnel ==
- Jimbo Mathus – vocals, guitar, tenor banjo, piano
- Katharine Whalen – vocals, banjo, baritone ukulele
- Tom Maxwell – vocals, guitar, baritone saxophone, clarinet, resonator, chandelier
- Ken Mosher – guitar, alto and baritone saxophones, baritone ukulele, vocals
- Don Raleigh – double bass, gong
- Chris Phillips – drums, percussion, announcement

Additional Musicians

- Duke Heitger – trumpet, cornet
- Andrew Bird – violin

Production

- Recorded by Brian Paulson and Mike Napolitano
- Mixed by Mike Napolitano and Squirrel Nut Zippers
- Clay Walker – multimedia producer

== Charts ==
=== Weekly charts ===
Chart (1996–1997)	Peak position
US Billboard 200	27

=== Year-end charts ===
Chart (1997)	Position
US Billboard 200	86
