= Robbie Conal =

American guerrilla poster artist

- Born: 1944 (age 81–82); New York City
- Education: The High School of Music & Art; San Francisco State University; Stanford University
- Known for: Public art
- Spouse: Deborah Ross

Robert "Robbie" Conal (born 1944) is an American guerrilla poster artist noted for his gnarled, grotesque depictions of U.S. political figures of note. A former hippie, he is noted for distributing his poster art throughout a city overnight using his "volunteer guerrilla postering army".

== Overview ==
Conal's parents were both union organizers, and he grew up in Manhattan. He "graduated" in arts from San Francisco State University in 1969, although he was two credits short of a degree. After living briefly in Canada he obtained a MFA from Stanford University in 1978, and moved to the Los Angeles area in 1984, where he currently resides. Conal is an adjunct professor of painting and drawing at the University of Southern California's Roski School of Fine Arts.

Conal's work has been featured in numerous publications, including Time, Newsweek, the New York Times, the Los Angeles Times, as well as CBS's CBS This Morning and Charlie Rose. He was the subject of the 1992 documentary Post No Bills directed by filmmaker Clay Walker. He has also written three books, including Art Attack: The Midnight Politics Of A Guerrilla Artist, Artburn (a collection of his work published in the alternative newspaper L.A. Weekly), and Not Your Typical Political Animal, with his wife, Deborah Ross. He has been awarded grants by the National Endowment for the Arts and the Getty Trust.

== See also ==
- Guerilla art
