= Curtis Boyd =

American jazz drummer

- Born: June 9, 1940 (age 85); New York City, New York, U.S.
- Genres: Jazz
- Occupation: Musician
- Instrument: Drummer

Curtis Boyd (born June 9, 1940, New York City) is an American jazz drummer. He was educated at the Chicago Conservatory of Music and the Brooklyn Academy of Music. He began to perform in the 1950s and has worked with performers such as Cedar Walton, Julian Priester, Wynton Kelly, Frank Strozier, Kenny Dorham, Chick Corea, Gloria Lynne, Ronnell Bright, Carmen McRae (with whom he recorded the album Bittersweet with), and Joe Williams. He became known in particular through his involvement in Billy Taylor's band in the 1980s. He was the drummer for the Freddy Cole Quartet.
