= Squirrel Nut Caramel =

Caramel candy mixed with peanuts

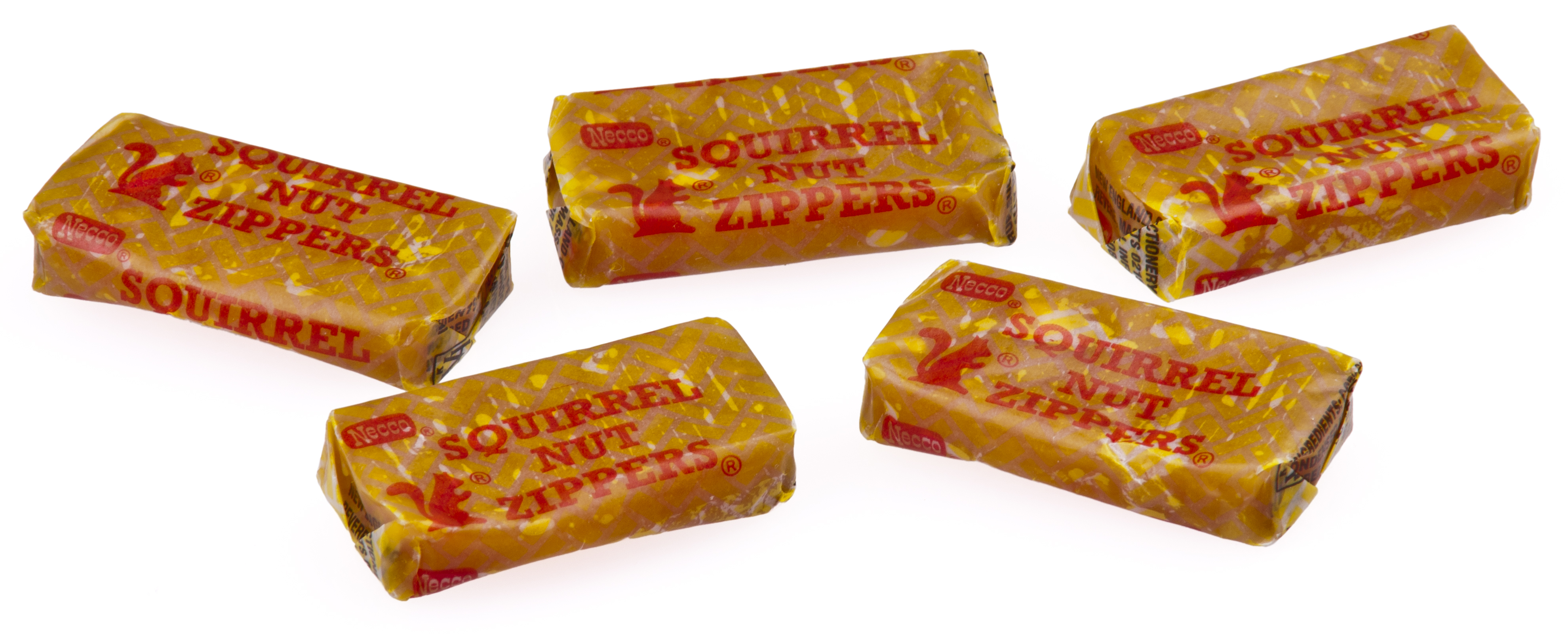
- Squirrel Nut Zipper candies
- Type: Caramel candy
- Place of origin: United States
- Created by: Austin T. Merrill Company
- Invented: 1890
- Main ingredients: Corn syrup, sugar, peanuts, condensed milk, chocolate, partially hydrogenated soybean and/or cottonseed oil, natural & artificial flavor, salt, and soy lecithin

Squirrel Nut Caramels (chocolate flavored) and Squirrel Nut Zippers (vanilla flavored) were chewy caramel candy mixed with peanuts.

== Description ==
Chocolate Squirrel caramels were the original flavor of Squirrel Nut brand caramels. The ingredients are: corn syrup, sugar, peanuts, condensed milk, chocolate, partially hydrogenated soybean and/or cottonseed oil, natural & artificial flavor, salt, and soy lecithin.

Squirrel Nut Zippers, the vanilla nut caramel variety, were developed in the mid-1920s to complement the chocolate variety.

Squirrel Nut Zippers contained peanuts and were sometimes passed out at performances by a band that shared the same name of Squirrel Nut Zippers. Squirrel Nut Zippers were small and tended to be soft and chewy, hardening quickly when outside of their packaging, while warming them slightly revived their chewy texture.

== Manufacturer ==
Squirrel Nut Caramels were originally made by the Austin T. Merrill Company of Roxbury, Massachusetts in 1890. It was soon reincorporated as the Squirrel Brand Company (1899–1999), which moved to North Carolina in 1903. In 1915, it moved its factory again to 12 Boardman Street in the Area 4 neighborhood of Cambridge, Massachusetts, where it remained until 1999. That year, the company was sold and moved to McKinney, Texas, where a nut-processing operation continues.

However, in 2004 the Necco company brought the Squirrel Nut candy brand back to Massachusetts, where they were produced until Necco ceased operation in 2018.

In 2003, the former factory building in Cambridge was converted to affordable public housing apartments. A public park and community gardening space, named Squirrel Brand Park, is now located next to the former factory.
