= Dance Mania (album) =

Studio album by Tito Puente
- Released: August 1958
- Recorded: November – December 1957
- Genre: Mambo
- Length: 37:50
- Label: RCA
- Producer: Mickey Crofford

Tito Puente chronology
Top Percussion (1957)	Dance Mania (1958)	Puente in Love (1959)

Professional ratings
Review scores
Source	Rating
Allmusic	link

Dance Mania is a studio album by American musician Tito Puente. The album was added to the National Recording Registry in 2002. It is also listed among the 1001 Albums You Must Hear Before You Die.

== Track listing ==
All tracks written by Tito Puente, except where noted.

No.	Title	Writer(s)	Length
1.	"El Cayuco"		2:33
2.	"Complicación"	Aguabella	3:18
3.	"3-D Mambo"	Ray Santos	2:23
4.	"Llegó Miján"		3:10
5.	"Cuando Te Vea"		4:10
6.	"Hong Kong Mambo"		3:42
7.	"Mambo Gozón"		2:44
8.	"Mi Chiquita Quiere Bembé"		3:55
9.	"Varsity Drag"	DeSylva; Brown; Henderson	2:48
10.	"Estoy Siempre Junto a Ti"	Delgado	3:10
11.	"Agua Limpia Todo"	Aguabella	2:55
12.	"Saca Tu Mujer"		3:02

== Personnel ==
- Tito Puente – leader, arranger, timbales, vibraphone, marimba
- Bernie Glow, Jimmy Frisaura, Frank Lo Pinto, George López, Gene Repetti, Larry Moser, León Merian – trumpet
- Rafael Palau, Jerry Sanfino, Schapp Pullman, Tony Buonpastore – saxophone
- Raymond Concepción – piano
- Bobby Rodríguez – bass
- Ray Barretto – congas
- Ray Rodríguez – bongos
- Julito Collazo – congas (tracks 4 and 11)
- Santitos Colón – lead vocals, chorus
- Vitin Avilés, Otto Olivar – chorus
- Mickey Crofford – original studio engineer
