= Freddy Cole =

American jazz singer and pianist (1931–2020)

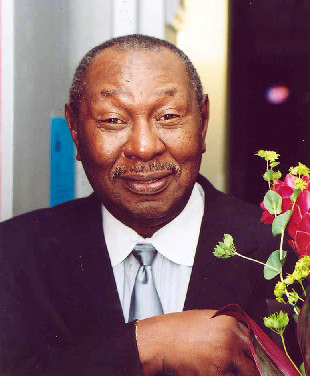
- Cole in 2003

Background information
- Born: Lionel Frederick Cole; October 15, 1931; Chicago, Illinois, U.S.
- Died: June 27, 2020 (aged 88) Atlanta, Georgia, U.S.
- Genre: Jazz
- Occupations: Musician, singer
- Instruments: Vocals; piano
- Years active: 1952–2020
- Labels: Decca; Fantasy; Telarc; HighNote

Lionel Frederick Cole (October 15, 1931 – June 27, 2020) was an American jazz singer and pianist whose recording career spanned almost 70 years. He was the brother of musicians Nat King Cole, Eddie Cole, and Ike Cole, father of Lionel Cole, and uncle of Natalie Cole and Carole Cole.

== Early life ==
Freddy Cole was born to Rev. Edward J. Coles and Perlina (née Adams) Coles, and grew up in Chicago, Illinois. His brothers Nat "King" Cole (1919–1965), Eddie (1910–1970), and Ike (1927–2001) also each pursued careers in music. He began playing piano at the age of six, and continued his musical education at the Roosevelt Institute in Chicago. He moved to New York in 1951, where he studied at the Juilliard School of Music before completing a master's degree at the New England Conservatory of Music.

== Career ==
Following the moderate success of "Whispering Grass" on OKeh Records in 1953 Cole spent several months on the road with Johnny Coles and Benny Golson as the Earl Bostic band. During the 1970s, Cole recorded several albums for European and English-based labels. He went on to work with Grover Washington, Jr. and to record jingles for various companies, including Turner Classic Movies He was the subject of the 2006 documentary, The Cole Nobody Knows. In June of that year, Cole was added to the Steinway Artist roster.

Cole was inducted into the Georgia Music Hall of Fame in 2007. In July 2009, he released a recording featuring his own quartet (guitarist Randy Napoleon, drummer Curtis Boyd, and bassist Elias Bailey), along with tenor saxophonist Jerry Weldon and pianist John DiMartino, playing live at Dizzy's jazz club in Lincoln Center. His 2010 album, Freddy Cole Sings Mr. B, was nominated for the Grammy in the category Best Jazz Vocal Album. The album features tenor Houston Person, pianist John DiMartino, guitarist/arranger Randy Napoleon, drummer Curtis Boyd, and bassist Elias Bailey. In 2010, his publicist Al Gomes scored Cole his first national TV appearance in years, performing live on the Jerry Lewis MDA Telethon.

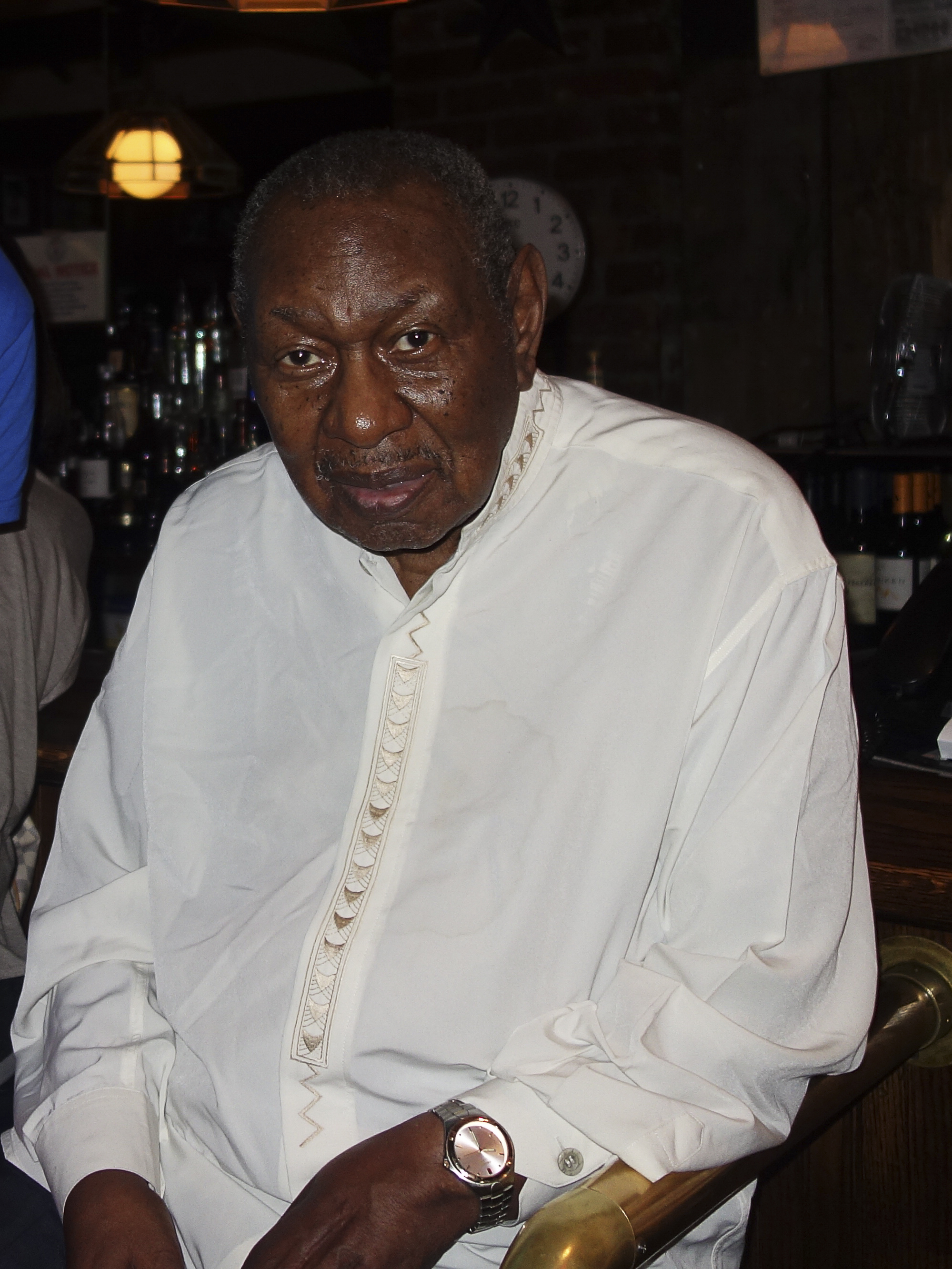
Freddy Cole at Blues Alley, 2017

His 2018 album, My Mood is You was also nominated for a Grammy for Best Jazz Vocal Album; the album features Napoleon, Bailey, DiMartino as well as drummer Quentin Baxter and tenor Joel Frahm. Arrangements are by Napoleon and DiMartino.

Cole's influences included John Lewis, Oscar Peterson, Teddy Wilson and Billy Eckstine. When speaking of Eckstine, Cole recalled: "He was a fantastic entertainer. I learned so much from just watching and being around him."

Guitarist Randy Napoleon, who played and recorded with Cole from 2007 until Cole's death, said: "Freddy just glides through life. He's got a lot of patience, warmth, a great sense of humor. The music is really inseparable from the person...One of the things that makes Freddy really great is his elegance and careful, judicious editing. He doesn't play a lot of notes on piano, but the ones he plays really do make the band feel great. They're melodic, it swings, and that's it. He doesn't feel you need a lot of extra, fancy stuff."

== Death ==
Freddy Cole died on June 27, 2020, aged 88. He was remembered by notable jazz artists in an article in ArtsATL.

== Discography ==
- Waiter, Ask the Man to Play the Blues (Dot, 1964)
- On Second Thought (De-Lite, 1969)
- Freddy Cole's Christmas Dreams (Arrikka, 1975)
- As Long As I'm Singing (First Shot, 1976)
- The Cole Nobody Knows (First Shot, 1976)
- Just Plain Freddy - Live (First Shot, 1976)
- Sing (Demand, 1977)
- One More Love Song (Decca (UK), 1978)
- I Loved You (Som Livre, 1978)
- Latino (Som Livre, 1979)
- Right from the Heart (Decca (UK), 1980)
- Like a Quiet Storm (Dinky, 1983)
- Appearing Nightly (Dinky, 1987)
- I'm Not My Brother I'm Me (Sunnyside, 1991)
- Just the Way I Am – Salute to Nat King Cole (Alfa, 1992)
- Live at Birdland West (Laserlight, 1992)
- This Is the Life (Muse, 1993)
- Live at Vartan Jazz (Vartan Jazz, 1994)
- Always (Fantasy, 1994)
- I Want a Smile for Christmas (Fantasy, 1994)
- A Circle of Love (Fantasy, 1996)
- It's Crazy but I'm in Love (After 9, 1996)
- The Ends of the Earth (Fantasy, 1997)
- Love Makes the Changes (Fantasy, 1998)
- Le Grand Freddy (Fantasy, 1999)
- Merry-Go-Round (Telarc, 2000)
- Rio De Janeiro Blue (Telarc, 2001)
- In the Name of Love (Telarc, 2003)
- This Love of Mine (HighNote, 2005)
- Because of You (HighNote, 2006)
- Music Maestro Please with Bill Charlap (HighNote, 2007)
- When You're Smiling with Marlena Shaw (Ratspack, 2007)
- The Dreamer in Me: Live at Dizzy's Club Coca-Cola (HighNote, 2009)
- Freddy Cole Sings Mr. B (HighNote, 2010)
- Talk to Me (HighNote, 2011)
- This and That (HighNote, 2013)
- Singing the Blues (HighNote, 2014)
- He Was The King (HighNote, 2016)
- My Mood Is You (HighNote, 2018)
