= Squirrel Nut Zippers =

American swing and jazz band formed in 1993

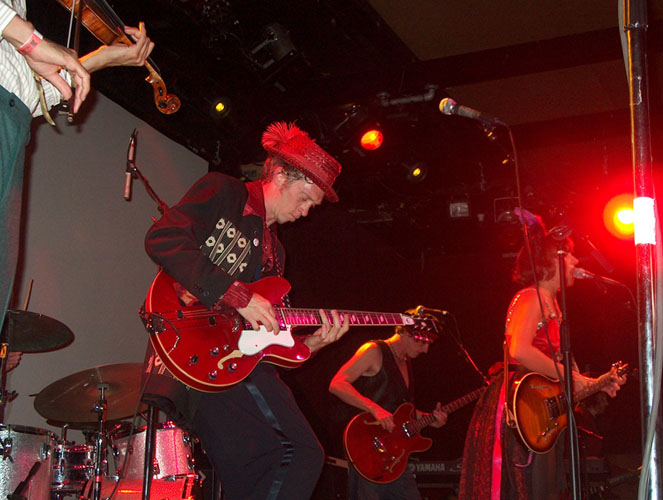
- Performing in San Francisco, 2008

Background information
- Origin: Chapel Hill, North Carolina, U.S.
- Genres: Jazz; swing revival
- Years active: 1993–2000; 2006–2010; 2016–present
- Label: Mammoth
- Members: Jimbo Mathus; Hank West; Dr. Sick; Cella Blue; Leslie P. Martin; Eddie King; Dave Boswell; John Kveen; Neilson Bernard III
- Past members: Tom Maxwell; Ken Mosher; Katharine Whalen; Chris Phillips; Don Raleigh; Stacy Guess; Stu Cole; Je Widenhouse; Robert Griffin; Dave Wright; Tim Smith; Adam Lake; Reese Gray; Andrew Bird; Will Dawson; Gabriel Pelli; Tim Kendt; Christopher A. Scott; Kevin O'Donnell; Laura McIndoe; Ingrid Lucia; Charlie Halloran; Colin Myers; Kris Tokarski; Kevin Louis; Steve Suter; Gabo Tomasini; Tamara Nicolai
- Website: www.snzippers.com

Squirrel Nut Zippers is an American swing and jazz band formed in 1993 in Chapel Hill, North Carolina, by James "Jimbo" Mathus (vocals and guitar), Tom Maxwell (vocals and guitar), Katharine Whalen (vocals, banjo, ukulele), Chris Phillips (drums), Don Raleigh (bass guitar), and Ken Mosher.

The band's music is a fusion of Delta blues, gypsy jazz, 1930s–era swing, klezmer, and other styles. They found commercial success during the swing revival of the late 1990s with their 1996 single "Hell", written by Tom Maxwell. After a hiatus of several years, the original band members reunited and performed in 2007, playing in the U.S. and Canada.

In 2016, Mathus and Phillips reunited the band with a new lineup to tour in support of the 20th anniversary of their highest-selling album, Hot.

The Squirrel Nut Zippers continue to tour, and released their new album Beasts of Burgundy in March 2018, and singles "Mardi Gras for Christmas" and "Alone at Christmas" in November 2018.

== History ==
=== Swing revival ===
The band was founded by James "Jimbo" Mathus, formerly of Metal Flake Mother and Johnny Vomit & The Dry Heaves, and his then-wife Katharine Whalen in Carrboro, North Carolina, with Tom Maxwell, Chris Phillips, Don Raleigh, and Ken Mosher. The group made its debut in Chapel Hill a few months later. Stacy Guess (formerly of Pressure Boys) joined shortly after.

"Nut Zippers" is a southern term for a variety of old bootleg moonshine. The band's name comes from a newspaper story about an intoxicated man who climbed a tree and refused to come down even after police arrived. The headline was "Squirrel Nut Zipper". It is also the name of a caramel and peanut candy dating back to 1890.

The band is credited for contributing to the swing revival that occurred during the 1990s. The band was influenced by Johnny Ace, Cab Calloway, Django Reinhardt, Raymond Scott, Fats Waller, and Tom Waits. The breakthrough single "Hell", with its Latin-tinged rhythm, more closely aligned the band with the neo-swing movement.

The Zippers's debut album, The Inevitable (1995), received airplay on National Public Radio, and its second album, Hot (1996), was certified platinum. Hot was also one of the first enhanced CDs, containing an interactive presentation created by filmmaker Clay Walker. In support of the album, the band toured with rock singer Neil Young. Perennial Favorites (1998) followed, then Christmas Caravan and Bedlam Ballroom.

The Squirrel Nut Zippers performed at the 1996 Summer Olympics in Atlanta and at President Clinton's second inaugural ball. Their numerous appearances included such notables as the radio show Prairie Home Companion and on television shows The Tonight Show, Late Show with David Letterman, Conan O'Brien, Viva Variety, and Dick Clark's New Year's Rockin' Eve.

=== Hiatus and other projects ===
By the early 2000s, the Zippers were inactive. Mathus and Katharine Whalen had divorced, and the band members went their separate ways.

Whalen released her debut album, Katharine Whalen's Jazz Squad. Mathus toured and recorded extensively with Buddy Guy and has released 18 solo records on various labels, and under various names, while keeping a hand in numerous other projects. Je Widenhouse and Reese Gray recorded and toured with Firecracker Jazz Band. Chris Phillips spent two years with the Dickies and William Reid from the Jesus and Mary Chain. His band The Lamps included members of the Bangles and The Connells.

=== Reunions ===
In early 2007, the band's official website announced tour dates with a lineup consisting of Jimbo Mathus, Katharine Whalen, Chris Phillips, Je Widenhouse, Stuart Cole, Hank West, and Will Dawson. With the proclamation "Ladies and Gentlemen...They're Back", the band performed concert dates throughout the U.S. and Canada in the spring and summer of 2007 and through 2008.

In late February 2009, Phillips sent an email announcing a forthcoming live album titled You Are My Radio, recorded in Brooklyn in December 2008. The album title was later changed to Lost at Sea and was released on October 27 through Southern Broadcasting/MRI. They also announced plans for a studio album in 2010. The band taped a performance for NPR's Mountain Stage, which aired in mid-November.

Following renewed interest at the approach of the 20th Anniversary of Hot, Mathus began assembling a revival band, focusing on musicians in the New Orleans area. They began touring in June 2016, with the initial line-up including Mathus, Dr. Sick (fiddle, vocals), Ingrid Lucia (vocals), Kris Tokarski (piano), Charlie Halloran (trombone), Dave Boswell (trumpet), Hank West (saxophone), Tamara Nicolai (upright bass) and Kevin O'Donnell (drums), with original Zippers drummer Chris Phillips managing.

The band has continued to tour; the studio album Beasts of Burgundy was released on March 23, 2018 through their own label Southern Broadcasting. Performers on the album include Mathus (guitar, vocals), Dr. Sick (fiddle, banjo, various instruments, vocals), Cella Blue (vocals), Vanessa Niemann (vocals), Tamar A. Korn (vocals), Dave Boswell (trumpet), Kevin Louis (trumpet), Aurora Nealand (clarinet), Charlie Halloran (trombone), Colin Myers (trombone), Henry Westmoreland (tenor and baritone saxophone), Kris Tokarski (piano), Leslie P. Martin (piano), Tamara Nicolai (upright bass), Neilson Bernard III (drums) and Chris Phillips (percussion).

== Discography ==
=== Studio albums ===
- The Inevitable (1995)
- Hot (1996)
- Perennial Favorites (1998)
- Christmas Caravan (1998)
- Bedlam Ballroom (2000)
- Beasts of Burgundy (2018)
- Lost Songs of Doc Souchon (2020)
- The Squirrel Nut Zippers Starring in Fat City (The Ballad of Lil Tony) (2026)

=== Live albums ===
- Lost at Sea (2009)

=== EPs ===
- Roasted Right (1994)
- Sold Out (1997)

=== Compilations ===
- The Best of Squirrel Nut Zippers as Chronicled by Shorty Brown (2002)

=== Singles ===
Title	Year	Peak chart positions		Album
Title	Year	Modern Rock Tracks	US Air	Album
"Hell"	1996	13	72	Hot
"Put a Lid on It"	1996	—	—	Hot
"Suits Are Picking Up the Bill"	1998	—	—	Perennial Favorites
"Ghost of Stephen Foster"	1999	—	—	Perennial Favorites

== Soundtracks ==
As of 2021, music performed by the Squirrel Nut Zippers has appeared in 25 films or television shows.

Song	Work	Year
"Anything But Love"	Flirting with Disaster	1996
"Meant to Be"	Just Your Luck	1996
"Hell"	Dream with the Fishes	1997
"Blue Angel"	Dream with the Fishes	1997
"Put a Lid on It"	A Life Less Ordinary	1997
"Hell"	Millennium - S2 Ep5	1997
"Meant to Be"	Sex and the City - S1 Ep8	1998
"Hell"	Dead Man on Campus	1998
"Got My Own Thing Now"	Fifty	1999
"Trou Macacq"	Three to Tango	1999
"Hell"	Blast from the Past	1999
"Trou Macacq"	Blast from the Past	1999
"Blue Angel"	The Last Kiss	2001
"Hell"	Monkeybone	2001
"Hell"	Dead Like Me - S1 Ep1	2003
"Moon Over Parma"	The Drew Carey Show - S8 Ep20	2003
"Good Enough for Grandad"	Comic Book: The Movie	2004
"Anything But Love"	The O.C. - S1 Ep19	2004
"Put a Lid on it"	Fido	2006
"Baby Wants a Diamond Ring"	Happily N'Ever After	2007
"Hell"	Banished	2007
"My Drag"	You Kill Me	2007
"Hell"	Sigma Die!	2007
"Ghost of Stephen Foster"	Tears for Sale	2008
"Poor Boys Blues"	Burlesque	2010
"That Fascinating Thing"	Burlesque	2010
"Verdi Mart Shuffle"	Burlesque	2010
"Curly's Blues"	Burlesque	2010
"Suits Are Picking Up the Bill"	Burlesque	2010
"Sitting Pretty"	Burlesque	2010
"Hell"	Epic	2013
"Put a Lid on It"	For All Mankind - S1 Ep1	2019
