= Tom Maxwell (singer) =

American singer-songwriter (b. 1965)

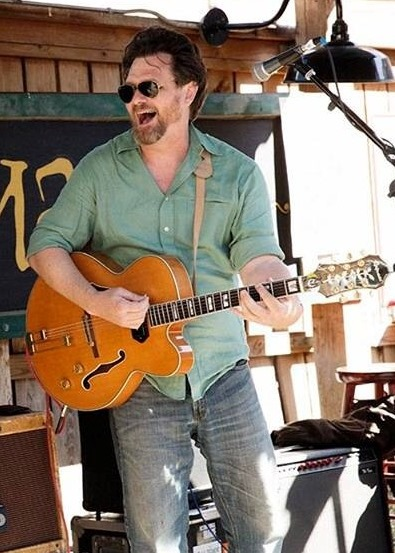
- Maxwell at South by Southwest 2014

Background information
- Born: Thomas Edward Maxwell; September 19, 1965 (age 60); Fort Lauderdale, Florida, U.S.
- Occupations: Songwriter, singer, musician
- Instruments: Vocals, guitar, saxophone, clarinet
- Years active: 1986-present
- Labels: Merge, Mammoth, Moist/Baited Breath

Thomas Edward Maxwell (born September 19, 1965) is an American songwriter, singer, and musician most known for being a member of the swing revival band Squirrel Nut Zippers, for which he wrote the single "Hell" from the 1996 platinum-certified album Hot.

== Early life ==
Thomas Edward Maxwell was born September 19, 1965, in Ft. Lauderdale, Florida. His parents are Joseph Maxwell and Nancy (née Miller) Maxwell. In 1972, his family moved to Burnsville, North Carolina.

In elementary school, Maxwell began playing alto sax. When he was fourteen, he taught himself to play the drums. He attended the University of North Carolina at Chapel Hill when he was seventeen. While there, he was a member of St. Anthony Hall and started his first band, Teasing the Korean, with classmate John Ensslin. In 1990, Teasing the Korean became What Peggy Wants, and they were signed to a local Chapel Hill label, Moist/Baited Breath. In December 1993, What Peggy Wants broke up.

During his time in What Peggy Wants, Maxwell befriended Metal Flake Mother drummer Jimbo Mathus. In 1992, until Metal Flake Mother disbanded, Mathus became lead guitarist and Maxwell briefly joined as the band's drummer.

== Career ==
=== Squirrel Nut Zippers ===
In 1993, Mathus formed the neo-swing, pre-war jazz revival group Squirrel Nut Zippers with Katharine Whalen, Ken Mosher, Don Raleigh, and Chris Phillips, They played a couple of local shows and recorded a three-track EP on Merge Records. In January 1994, Maxwell was asked to join the band. During his tenure in the Zippers, Maxwell served as one of the group's primary vocalists and songwriters and played guitar, tenor and baritone saxophone, and clarinet.

The band signed with Mammoth Records in the summer of 1994. They recorded their first record, The Inevitable, a few months later in Hillsborough, North Carolina. In the summer of 1995, Maxwell, Mosher, and Mathus took a trip to New Orleans, Louisiana to visit their friend, Blind Melon drummer Glen Graham who had recorded Soup with Blind Melon at Daniel Lanois' Kingsway Studios earlier that year.

In October 1995, the Squirrel Nut Zippers went to New Orleans to record its Hot album at Kingsway Studios with producer Mike Napolitano. They recorded Hot in six days, and the record was released in June 1996. The record went certified gold in May 1997, and by September of that year it was RIAA certified platinum, selling over 1.3 million copies. Maxwell's song "Hell", a single tone calypso, charted at No. 13 on Billboard Hot 100.

In 1999, Maxwell and Mosher left the band, due to a management agreement that the band had signed without their knowledge. The band refused to pay royalties to either of them, which led to a five-year legal battle. They settled out of court for $155,000, but the band breached the settlement and the two were only awarded a fraction of the money. This led to an irreparable relationship between Maxwell/Mosher and Mathus/Whalen.

In late December 2015, Maxwell published a piece on Medium explaining why he was not participating in the Squirrel Nut Zippers' 2016 tour. The band plans to reissue Hot for its 20-year anniversary; one-third of the record's material was written by Maxwell and Mosher, including both singles which were penned by Maxwell.

=== Solo musician ===
In 1999, Maxwell recorded his first solo album, Samsara, at Kingsway Studios. He toured for the record with Mosher and Phillips, along with Ben Folds Five bassist Robert Sledge. Because of the Squirrel Nut Zippers legal turmoil and the birth of his first child, Maxwell stopped touring from 2000 until 2015.

For several years, Maxwell worked with Mosher, contributing songs and scores for films and television, including season 1 of Lovespring International and the animated film Happily N'ever After.

Maxwell left music in 2006 to focus on his son's health. in 2009, Maxwell returned to music and released the first studio album Kingdom Come, in 2011. In 2014, Maxwell released his first record with The Minor Drag, Tom Maxwell & The Minor Drag, produced by Napolitano.

=== Writing ===
Maxwell is a freelance writer who has contributed to Al Jazeera America, Slate, Oxford American, Salon, Southern Cultures, and Bitter Southerner. In 2014, Maxwell wrote a memoir, Hell – My Life In the Squirrel Nut Zippers, about his experience in the band, his time on the road, and the recording of the band's albums. His book, A Really Strange and Wonderful Time: The Chapel Hill Music Scene: 1989–1999, was released in April 2024.

== Honors ==
Maxwell was inducted into the North Carolina Music Hall of Fame in 2020 as a member of the Squirrel Nut Zippers.

== Personal life ==
In 2006, just days after he and his first wife separated, Maxwell's three-year-old son was diagnosed with leukemia. Maxwell retreated from his musical career and focused on shepherding his son through a three-and-a-half-year treatment. His son made a full recovery.

In 2014, Maxwell and his family moved into Poplar Hill, a historic Greek Revival mansion in Hillsborough, North Carolina. They rented the former plantation home, which had once belonged to tobacco industrialist and white supremacist Julian Carr, but broke their lease due to what they reported were various hauntings.
