= Katharine Whalen =

American musician

Katharine Whalen is a musician, singer, and songwriter originally from Greenville, North Carolina. She contributed vocals, banjo, and ukulele as a member of the Chapel Hill jazz band Squirrel Nut Zippers, a group that she founded in 1993 with then-husband Jimbo Mathus.

After the breakup of Squirrel Nut Zippers, Whalen released an album on Mammoth called Katharine Whalen's Jazz Squad. She took part in Zippers revival tours during the years 2007–09. Since then she has been a member of the bands Swedish Wood Patrol and Certain Seas.

== Discography ==
- Katharine Whalen's Jazz Squad (1999, Mammoth Records)
- Dirty Little Secret (2006, M.C. Records)
- Madly Love (2011, Five Head Entertainment)
- Whaler's Ink (2014, as Risk Whalen with Brian Risk)
- Swedish Wood Patrol EP (2017, with Swedish Wood Patrol)
- Certain Seas (2019, with Certain Seas)
- A Simple Sampler of Small Delights (2021, with Certain Seas)
- To Hide a Heart That's Blue (2021, with her Jazz Squad)
- Oh Sage Orange Egg (2024, with Certain Seas)
- Let's get Lost - Songs Chet Would Sing (2024, with her Jazz Squad)
