= Jimbo Mathus =

American musician

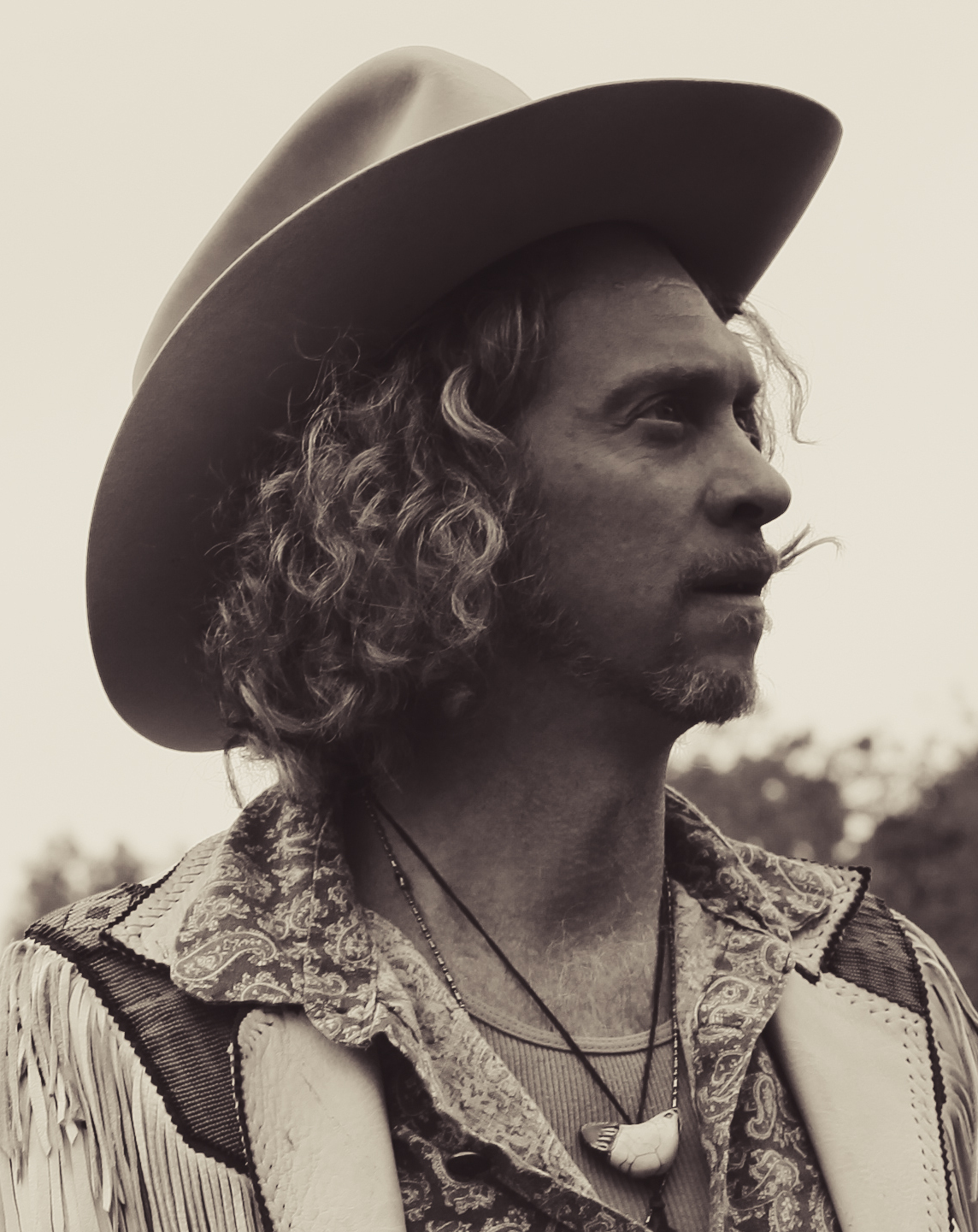
- Mathus in 2011

Background information
- Also known as: Jim Mathus, Jas Mathus, James Mathus, Hambone Mathus
- Born: James H. Mathis Jr. August 1967 (age 59); Oxford, Mississippi, United States
- Genres: Jazz; blues; country
- Occupations: Entertainer, singer, instrumentalist, songwriter, tankerman
- Instruments: Guitar, bass, drums, piano, trombone, mandolin, harmonica
- Years active: 1980s–present
- Labels: Merge; Mammoth; Hollywood; Hill Country; Memphis International; Knockdown South; 219

James H. Mathis Jr. (born August 1967), known as Jimbo Mathus, is an American singer-songwriter, guitarist, and member of the hot jazz band Squirrel Nut Zippers.

== Early life and career ==
He was born in Oxford, Mississippi to Jimmy Mathis and Jeanella (Malvezzi) Mathis. His family is of Scottish and Italian origin. His early life was filled with music, as his father and relatives were instrumentalists and singers. He began joining the family musical circle at an early age and by age eight played mandolin. By 15, Mathus had been taught the rudiments of guitar, piano and harmony singing. The family's repertoire consisted of folk, bluegrass, country blues and pre-recorded songs passed down through the Mathus and Byrd families. His father was an outdoorsman, traveler and also raised hunting dogs and horses. Thus, Mathus' early life included hunting and fishing in the Corinth, Mississippi, area.

Mathus was involved in rock and roll in Corinth High School and was recorded first in 1983 at Sam Phillips Memphis Recording Service in Memphis, Tennessee, in a group called The End. He also helped found Johnny Vomit & The Dry Heaves, which was one of the first punk rock/experimental noise bands in the state of Mississippi.

He left home at age 17 to study philosophy at Mississippi State University and began writing songs and performing in the Starkville, Mississippi, area. He was recorded and released records in the mid-1980s under the name Cafe des Moines. In 1987, Mathus joined the Merchant Marines working as a deckhand and tankerman for the Canal Barge Company on the Mississippi, Illinois and Tennessee Rivers. He used his shore leave to travel the country, usually alone, camping and sleeping in his pickup truck. On a chance trip to North Carolina, he decided to move to the Chapel Hill area.

Educating himself in the libraries of the University of North Carolina at Chapel Hill, Mathus learned Latin, studied theater, poetry, First Peoples culture, literature and medieval alchemy, as well as music. It was during this time that he changed the spelling of his last name from "Mathis" to "Mathus," to reflect his respect for his and his mother's Latin studies. He first performed in this area as a drummer, with his group – Metal Flake Mother.

== Squirrel Nut Zippers ==
In 1993, Mathus met and married Katharine Whalen. Together they formed Squirrel Nut Zippers. This group used Mathus' knowledge of theater, early American music and leadership along with Whalen's fashion and vocal style. The group toured throughout the 1990s, appearing at A Prairie Home Companion, the second inauguration of Bill Clinton, and the 1996 Summer Olympics in Atlanta. They also performed on television programs The Tonight Show, Late Night with David Letterman, Late Night with Conan O'Brien and Dick Clark's New Year's Rockin' Eve in 1998. Their albums have been awarded gold and platinum records by the Recording Industry Association of America, and Billboard chart history includes No. 18 for the album Perennial Favorites, and No. 27 for the album Hot.

== Solo career and the Tri-State Coalition ==
In the mid-1990s, Mathus' frequent trips back to Mississippi led to his meeting Jim and Luther Dickinson, which resulted in Mathus writing and recording (Jas. Mathus & His Knockdown Society) Play Songs for Rosetta. This was a benefit project to aid Mathus' childhood nanny, Rosetta Patton, daughter of Charley Patton. This rekindled Mathus' interest in Mississippi music and set him on a new path. During this time, Mathus also began recording and producing on his own.

The Squirrel Nut Zippers disbanded in 2000. Mathus and Whalen divorced in 2003, at which time Mathus returned to his home state of Mississippi.

Simultaneously, Mathus was gaining recognition for his blues guitar knowledge through his work with Buddy Guy. Mathus toured with Guy off and on from 2001 to 2003. He also recorded with Guy on his album Sweet Tea, and the Grammy Award-winning album Blues Singer.

Mathus started his first studio in his mother's hometown of Clarksdale, Mississippi, in 2003. Using antique ribbon microphones and tube pre-amp, Mathus set up Delta Recording Service in the abandoned Alcazar Hotel in downtown Clarksdale and recorded artists there, including Elvis Costello. In 2007, Mathus relocated the studio to Como, Mississippi.

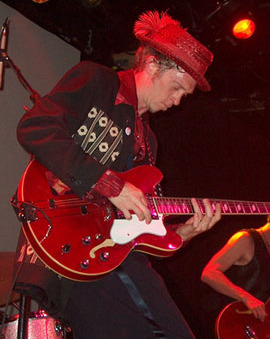
Mathus performing in 2008

Through the mid- to late 2000s, Mathus performed shows in the deep South, mostly in Mississippi. He became a regular performer at Morgan Freeman's Ground Zero Blues Club in Clarksdale, Mississippi, and acted as bandleader for the National Public Radio broadcast of "Toast of the Nation" on New Year's Eve in 2004.

In 2010, Mathus wrote and produced a historical musical revue entitled Mosquitoville, and led the 11-person cast in performances for communities across the state of Mississippi. He also helped form the South Memphis String Band with longtime collaborators Luther Dickinson and Alvin Youngblood Hart and once again signing with a label – Memphis International Records. In this same year, Mathus married Jennifer White Pierce, an Arkansas actress and writer whose brother – guitarist for Mathus' Tri-State Coalition – had introduced the two.

Mathus and his band, The Tri-State Coalition, released their album Confederate Buddha on Memphis International Records in May 2011. In 2012, alongside musician/producer Eric "Roscoe" Ambel, Mathus and Tri-State recorded the album White Buffalo at Delta Recording Services in February 2012. Mathus later dismantled and closed the studio in March.

Mathus released a six-song solo vinyl EP entitled Blue Light in July 2012 on Big Legal Mess Records. Mathus and Tri-State's White Buffalo was released on Fat Possum Records on January 22, 2013.

In 2014 Mathus released Dark Night of the Soul, a southern rock album which he described as "less sepia tone, more ultrachrome." He also toured the UK with blues musician Ian Siegal, which led to other collaborations including the Wayward Sons album and guesting on Siegal's Picnic Sessions album. He also produced and guested on Siegal's album All The Rage as well as co-writing some of the songs. They toured the UK again in 2016

In 2015 Mathus released Blue Healer, which he described as "pretty hard hitting" southern rock with elements of psychedelia. Mathus attributes the harder sound partly to his new drummer, Bronson Tew, as well as lead guitar appearances from Eric Ambel.

In 2021 Mathus released These 13, a collaboration with indie rock multi-instrumentalist and whistling aficionado Andrew Bird. The pair previously worked together in the band Squirrel Nut Zippers.

== Discography ==
Album	Year	Label	Band Name
Plays Songs for Rosetta	1997	Mammoth Records	Jas. Mathus and His Knock-Down Society
National Antiseptic	2001	Mammoth Records	James Mathus & His Knockdown Society
Stop and Let the Devil Ride	2003	Fast Horse/Ryko	James Mathus Knockdown Society
Knockdown South	2005	Knockdown South Records	Jimbo Mathus
Live at Ground Zero Blues Club	2005	Knockdown South Records	Jimbo Mathus & Friends
Old Scool Hot Wings	2006	219 Records	Jas. Mathus & Knockdown South
Jimmy the Kid	2009	Hill Country Records	Jimbo Mathus
Confederate Buddha	2011	Memphis International Records	Jimbo Mathus & The Tri-State Coalition
Blue Light	2012	Big Legal Mess Records	Jimbo Mathus
White Buffalo	2013	Fat Possum Records	Jimbo Mathus & The Tri-State Coalition
Dark Night of the Soul	2014	Fat Possum Records	Jimbo Mathus & The Tri-State Coalition
Blue Healer	2015	Fat Possum Records	Jimbo Mathus
Wayward Sons	2016	Nugene Records	Ian Siegal & Jimbo Mathus
Band of Storms	2016	Big Legal Mess Records	Jimbo Mathus
Incinerator	2019	Big Legal Mess Records	Jimbo Mathus
These 13	2021	Thirty Tigers	Jimbo Mathus & Andrew Bird
Since 1967	2023	Knockdown South Records	Jimbo Mathus
Live at The White Water Tavern, Vol. 1 - Saturday Night	2025	Music Maker	Jimbo Mathus
Live at The White Water Tavern, Vol. 2 - Easter Sunday	2026	Music Maker	Jimbo Mathus

Singles

- "Cadillac Man" (2020)
- "Take a Right at the Red Light" (2020)
- "Go Out to L.A." (2020)
- "Check's in the Mail" (2020)
- "Lodi" - Under Cover Series #1 (2020)
- "Couldn't Get High" - Under Cover Series #2 (2020)
- "Louisiana Man" - Under Cover Series #3 (2020)
- "Carmelita" - Under Cover Series #4 (2020)
- "The Letter" - Under Cover Series #5 (2020)
- "On the Road Again" - Under Cover Series #6 (2020)
- "Hey Mr. D.J." (2020)
- "Blue Crush" (2020)
- "She Wants to Sell My Monkey" - Under Cover Series #7 (2020)
- "Cold Reaction" (2020)
- "Possession" (2020)
- "Zombified" (2020)
- "Jerkin My Chain" (2020)
- "Long Black Veil" - Under Cover Series #8 (2021)
