= Lil =

Lil, LIL, Lil', Li'l or Lill may refer to:

== Contraction of "little" ==
=== Musicians ===
- Lil Aaron (born 1994), American singer and rapper
- Lil B (born 1989), American rapper and record producer
- Lil Baby (born 1994), American rapper
- Lil Bibby (born 1994), American rapper
- Lil Bitts (born 1984), Trinidadian soca musician
- Lil Boi (born 1991), South Korean rapper
- Boosie Badazz, formerly Lil' Boosie (born 1982), American rapper
- Bow Wow, formerly Lil' Bow Wow (born 1987), American rapper and actor
- Big Boi, formerly Lil' Brotha (born 1975), American rapper and record producer
- Lil Bruce, American rapper
- Lil' Buck Sinegal (1944–2019), American blues guitarist and singer
- Lill-Babs (1938–2018), Swedish singer and actress
- Lil' C-Note (born 1993), American actor and rapper
- Lil' Cease (born 1977), American rapper
- Lil' Chris (1990–2015), English pop singer and actor
- Lil Dicky (born 1988), American rapper, comedian and actor
- Lil Durk (born 1992), American rapper
- Droop-E, formerly Lil E (born 1988), American rapper and record producer
- Lil Eazy-E (born 1984), American rapper
- Lil' Ed Williams (born 1955), American blues guitarist and singer
- Lil' Eddie (born 1988), American singer and record producer
- Lil' Fame (born 1975), American rapper
- Lil' Flip (born 1981), American rapper
- Lil' Fizz (born 1985), American rapper and actor
- Lil Gnar (born 1996), American rapper
- Lil Gotit (born 1999), American rapper
- iROCC Williams, formerly Lil iROCC Williams (born 1990), American rapper and actor
- Lil Italy (born 1973), American rapper
- Jeezy, formerly Lil' J (born 1977), American rapper
- Lil JoJo (1994–2012), American rapper
- Lil Jon (born 1972), American rapper and record producer
- Lil Keed (1998–2022), American rapper
- Lil' Keke (born 1976), American rapper
- Lil' Kim (born 1974), American rapper
- Lil' Kleine (born 1994), Dutch rapper
- Lil Louis (born 1962), American house producer and DJ
- Lil Lotus (born 1994), American rapper and record producer
- Mr. Malik, formerly Lil' Malik (born 1977), American rapper
- Lil Mama (born 1989), American rapper
- Lil Mabu (born 2005), American rapper
- Lil McClintock (1883–1930s/1940), American country blues songster
- Lil' Mo (born 1978), American singer
- Lil Mosey (born 2002), American rapper
- Lil Nas X (born 1999), American rapper and singer
- CPO Boss Hogg, formerly Lil' Nation (1963–2022), American rapper
- Lil' O (born 1977), American rapper
- Benjamin Flores Jr., formerly Lil' P-Nut (born 2002), American rapper
- Lil Pappie (born 1991), Canadian rapper
- Lil Phat (1992–2012), American rapper
- Lil Peep (1996–2017), American rapper
- Lil Pump (born 2000), American rapper
- Lil Reese (born 1993), American rapper
- Lil' Rev (born 1968), American musician
- Lil Ric, American rapper
- Lil Rob (born 1975), American rapper
- Romeo, formerly Lil' Romeo (born 1989), American actor and rapper
- Lil' Ronnie, American record producer
- Lil Rounds (born 1984), a contestant on Season 8 of American Idol
- Lil Ru (born 1985), American rapper
- Lil Scrappy (born 1984), American rapper
- Lil Skies (born 1998), American rapper
- "Lil' Son" Jackson (1915–1976), American blues guitarist and singer
- Lil Suzy (born 1979), American singer
- Lil' T (1974–2007), Danish rapper and singer
- Lil Tecca (born 2002), American rapper
- Lil Tracy (born 1995), American rapper
- Lil Tjay (born 2001), American rapper
- Lil' Troy (born 1966), American rapper
- Lil Ugly Mane (born 1984), American rapper and record producer
- Lil Uzi Vert (born 1995), American rapper
- Lil Wayne (born 1982), American rapper
- Lil Weavah, American actor and record producer
- Lil' Wil (born 1987), American rapper
- Lil Wyte (born 1982), American rapper
- Lil Xan (born 1996), American rapper
- Lil Yachty (born 1997), American rapper
- Lil Zane (born 1982), American rapper and actor
- Lil Zay Osama (born 1997), American rapper

=== Entertainers ===
- Lil Buck (born 1988), American dancer
- Lil' C (born 1983), American dancer
- Lil Duval (born 1977), American comedian and actor
- Lil' JJ (born 1990), American actor, comedian and rapper
- Lil Rel Howery (born 1979), American comedian and actor
- Lil Tuffy (born 1972), American graphic designer

=== Athletes ===
- Brandon "Lil B" Turner (born 1981/1982), American skateboarder

=== Groups ===
- Lil'B, Japanese pop duo
- Lil' Mo' Yin Yang, American house duo

=== Other ===
- Li'l Abner, 1930s–1970s newspaper comic strip and titular main character
- Lil Bub (2011–2019), Internet celebrity cat
- Lil Me, 2015 mixtape by American rapper Wiki
- "Li'l Sebastian", 2011 episode of television series Parks and Recreation and titular miniature horse
- "Lil 'Tinker", 1948 short cartoon

== Short for given name ==
=== Short for "Lillian" ===
- Lil Hardin Armstrong (1898–1971), American jazz pianist, composer, arranger, singer and bandleader, second wife of Louis Armstrong
- Lil Green (1901–1954), American blues singer and songwriter
- Lil DeVille, a character on the American animated television show Rugrats

=== Short for "Ulysses" ===
- Lil Stoner (1899–1966), American professional baseball player

== LIL ==
- The law of the iterated logarithm
- IATA code for Lille Airport, France
- ICAO code for FlyLAL-Lithuanian Airlines, the national airline of Lithuania
- Lilydale railway station, Melbourne
- Little Implementation Language, an early UNIX system programming language
- Lughat al-Ishārāt al-Lubnāniyya, a Modern Standard Arabic name for Lebanese Levantine Sign

== See also ==
- Enochian Magic § The Thirty Æthyrs
