= Ping Pong Playa =

- Theatrical release poster
- Directed by: Jessica Yu
- Written by: Jimmy Tsai; Jessica Yu
- Produced by: Anne Clements; Joan Huang; Jeffrey Gou
- Starring: Jimmy Tsai; Andrew Vo; Khary Payton; Jim Lau; Roger Fan; Elizabeth Sung; Javin Reid; Kevin Chung; Peter Paige; Smith Cho; Scott Lowell; Stephnie Weir
- Cinematography: Frank G. Demarco
- Edited by: Zene Baker
- Music by: Jeff Beal
- Distributed by: IFC Films
- Release dates: September 9, 2007 (TIFF); September 5, 2008 (United States)
- Running time: 96 minutes
- Country: United States
- Languages: English; Chinese
- Box office: $77,907

Ping Pong Playa is a 2007 American sports comedy film directed by Jessica Yu and written by Yu and Jimmy Tsai. The story centers on a Chinese ping pong family living in California with a buffoonish and irreverent son.

== Plot ==
Christopher Wang is a 25-year-old man who lives under his Asian-American parents in a suburb in Southern California. His father, who was a prominent ping pong player in his youth, owns a sports goods shop, and his mother teaches young children at the sport at the local community center. Outperformed by his older brother, Michael, who is considered by their parents as more mature and responsible and has brought pride to the family by winning regional ping pong tournaments and also works as a doctor, Chris seems to lack motivation and a realistic vision for his career, indulging in defeating young kids in basketball, riding a mini moped and playing video games.

After his mother and Michael are injured in a minor car accident, Chris comes to learn about taking responsibility by taking over his mother's ping pong class and representing his family in the forthcoming ping pong tournament. With the training by his father and the support of his friends including a posse of young pupils, Chris strives to prove to those who put trust in him that he is capable of making serious effort while following through a commitment.

== Cast ==
- Jimmy Tsai as Christopher "C-Dub" Wang
- Andrew Vo as Felix
- Khary Payton as JP Money
- Jim Lau as Mr. Wang
- Roger Fan as Michael Wang
- Elizabeth Sung as Mrs. Wang
- Javin Reid as Prabaka
- Kevin Chung as William Lin
- Peter Paige as Gerald Harcourt
- Smith Cho as Jennifer
- Scott Lowell as Tom
- Stephnie Weir as Cheryl Davis
- Sir Jonathan Oliver as Jon Howard
- Shelley Malil as DB Reddy
- Martin Chow as Jerry Lin

== Reception ==
=== Critical response ===
Film and television review aggregator Rotten Tomatoes gives the film a rating of 64% based on 33 reviews, with an average rating of 5.9/10. Review aggregator Metacritic gives the film a score of 55 out of 100, based on 13 critics, indicating "generally mixed reviews". Film critic Justin Lowe of the Associated Press write in his review: "Yu directs with a clever eye and nimble camera, filling scenes with wicked banter, slapstick comedy and amusing visual puns. The rest of her team plays at a similarly skillful level, buoyed by a gleeful score featuring nonstop hip-hop beats."

== Home media ==
Ping Pong Playa was released on DVD on January 6, 2009, by Image Entertainment. Ping Pong Playa was released on Blu-ray February 10, 2009.

== Soundtrack ==
The soundtrack to Ping Pong Playa was released on CD on December 16, 2008, by Lakeshore Records.

=== Track listing ===
1. "Chinese School" (CHOPS)
2. "HK Superstar" (Jin Au-Yeung featuring Daniel Wu; Au-Yeung, Prohgress, Kevnish, Joe Cheung, and Stefan Taylor)
3. "My Rims" (CHOPS, Lil Weavah)
4. "Oh Oh Oh" (Kebyar; Mark Brooks and Rhaphael Turpley)
5. "Gotta Give It to 'Em" (Lexkon; Jason Rabinowitz, Gideon Black, and Hiles Black)
6. "I Like Cereal" (CHOPS)
7. "Goin' Dumb" (Against the Grain; Dustin Martin and Liz Ottinger)
8. "I Wish" (Far East Movement)
9. "Swing Baby Swing" (The DNC; Joachim Rygg, Stella Mwangi, and Abdul Saleh)
10. "Work" (Far East Movement)
11. "The Whistling Song" (The Pinker Tones; Salvador Rey Nagel and Alejandro Llovet Puigmarti)
12. "Who Wants to Party" (Cobalt Party Revolution; Ryan Michael Tilly, David John Willard, Jeffrey John Sankuer, and Vincent Ignatus Strokis III)
13. "My Spot" (Against the Grain; Dustin Martin and Liz Ottinger)
14. "I'm a Champ" (Far East Movement)
