= Smith Cho =

American actress

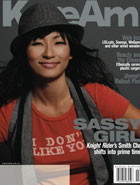
- Smith Cho on the cover of KoreAm magazine, November 2008
- Born: New Jersey
- Occupations: Actress, realtor

Smith Cho is an American actress and realtor of Korean descent. She has appeared in movies, on television and in commercials.

== Career ==
=== Acting ===
Cho has appeared in such movies as Bad Boys II, Norbit, Fired Up, Blades of Glory, The Circle (2017), and Ping Pong Playa, where she had a leading role. She has had numerous roles on television, including a starring role in Emily's Reasons Why Not, and has appeared in over 25 commercials. Cho also played Zoe Chae in the 2008 NBC series Knight Rider.

In 2009 Cho appeared on Ugly Betty as an editor who shares Betty's office. In September 2009, Cho was cast as series regular Leslie in the NBC situation comedy 100 Questions. In 2012, Cho appeared in a recurring role in the hour-long ABC drama Jane by Design.

Cho appeared in NBC's 2011 pilot Lovelives.

=== Other work ===
Cho works as a real estate agent in the Los Angeles area.

In 2021 she opened a liquor store in Brentwood, Los Angeles.

== Filmography ==
=== Film ===
Year	Title	Role	Notes
2003	Bad Boys II	Customer in Electronics Store	Uncredited
2007	Norbit	Deion's Asian wife	
2007	Blades of Glory	Woodland Fairie	
2007	Ping Pong Playa	Jennifer	
2008	The Last Lullaby	Connie	
2008	Meet Dave	Lieutenant Left Leg	
2008	Say Goodnight	Angela	
2009	The Slammin' Salmon	Translator	
2009	Fired Up!	Beth	
2017	The Circle	Gina	

=== Television ===
Year	Title	Role	Notes
2003	ER	Woo	Episode, "Finders Keepers"
2003	Six Feet Under	Art Student	Episode, "The Opening"
2003	Gilmore Girls	Girl	Episode, "The Hobbit, the Sofa, and Digger Stiles"
2003	Boston Public	Sandy	Episode, "Chapter Seventy-Two"
2003	Becker	Victoria	Episode, "A First Class Flight"
2004	Karen Sisco	Chrissy	Episode, "Dog Day Sisco"
2004	Dragnet	Marla	Episode, "Abduction"
2004	Summerland	Assistant	Episode, "Kicking and Screaming"
2005	House	Julia	Episode, "Histories"
2006	Emily's Reasons Why Not	Glitter Cho	Pilot
2007	Rules of Engagement	Sarah	Pilot
2007	Entourage	Chloe	Episodes, "The Resurrection"
2008–2009	Knight Rider	Zoe Chae	Regular
2009	Dark Blue	Elsa	Episode, "K-Town"
2009	Ugly Betty	Megan	Recurring, four Episodes
2009	Party Down		S1 E5 uncredited
2010	100 Questions	Leslie	Series regular, 6 episodes
2011	Lovelives	Kate	Lead Role
2012	Jane By Design	Rita Shaw	Recurring
2014	Friends with Better Lives	Val	Guest Star – "Pilot", "Surprises"
2014	About a Boy	Miguel's Mom	Episode, "About a Girl"
