= American Poster Institute =

Nonprofit organization in California

The American Poster Institute (API) is a California nonprofit corporation dedicated to promoting poster art and serving poster artists. Based in San Francisco, the API was formed in 2002 by a small group of poster artists and supporters.

== Purpose ==
Among the API's stated goals are:

- Support for the community of artists creating entertainment-related posters;
- Fostering interaction and communication between these artists:
- Constantly improving standards in the field; and
- Furthering public awareness and appreciation of the art form.

== Activities ==
Each year API organizes two or more FLATSTOCK poster exhibitions to showcase the work of its members. These exhibitions typically feature as many as 100 poster artists from all over the US, overseas, and Canada.

The first FLATSTOCK show was held in San Francisco in 2002. Each Spring since March 2003, the FLATSTOCK show has been part of the South by Southwest Music Conference (SXSW) in Austin, Texas, and it has been a part of the Bumbershoot Music Festival in Seattle each Fall.

== Gallery ==
=== Flatstock SXSW 2025 ===
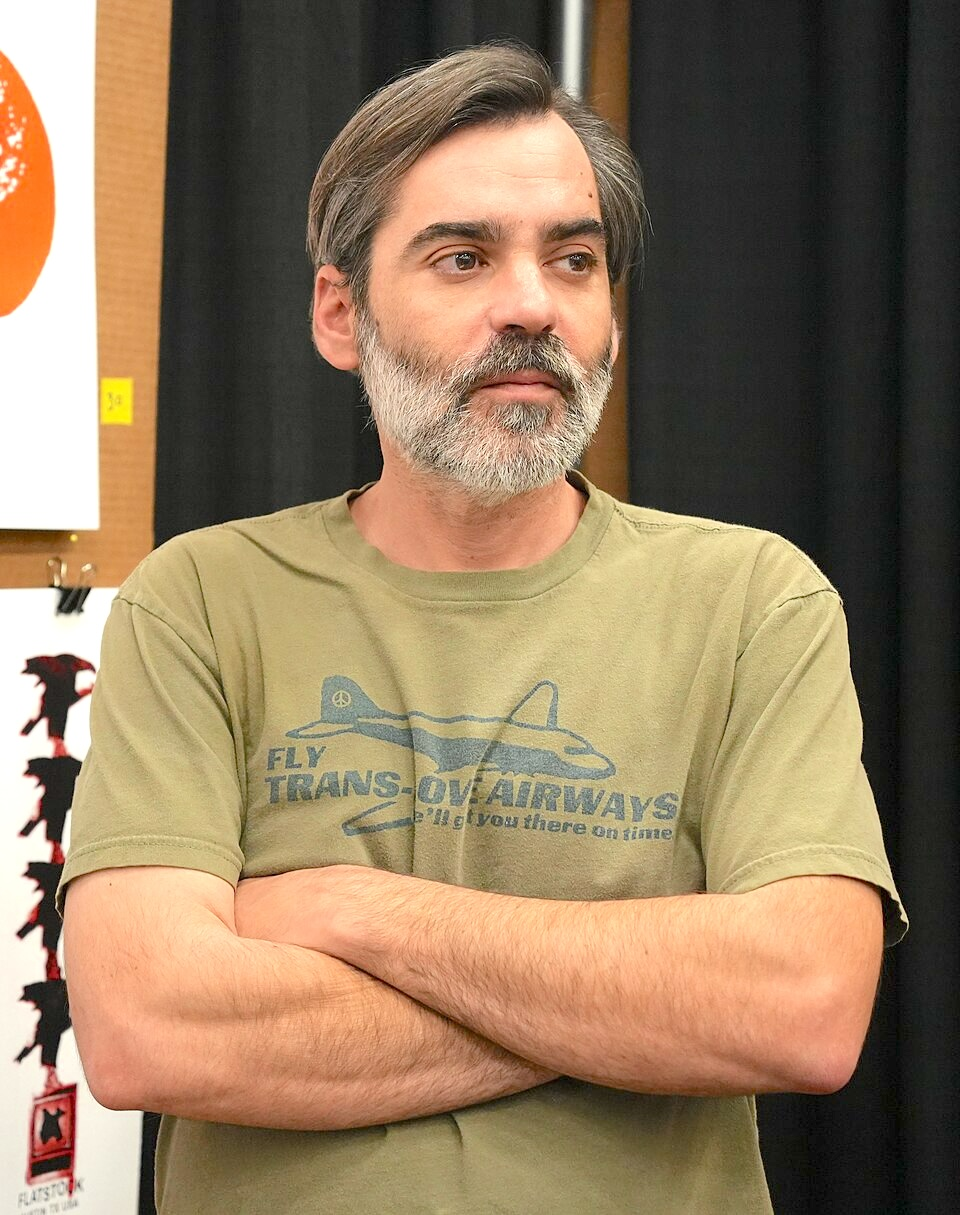
Andrew Hammond Kendall ("AHK")

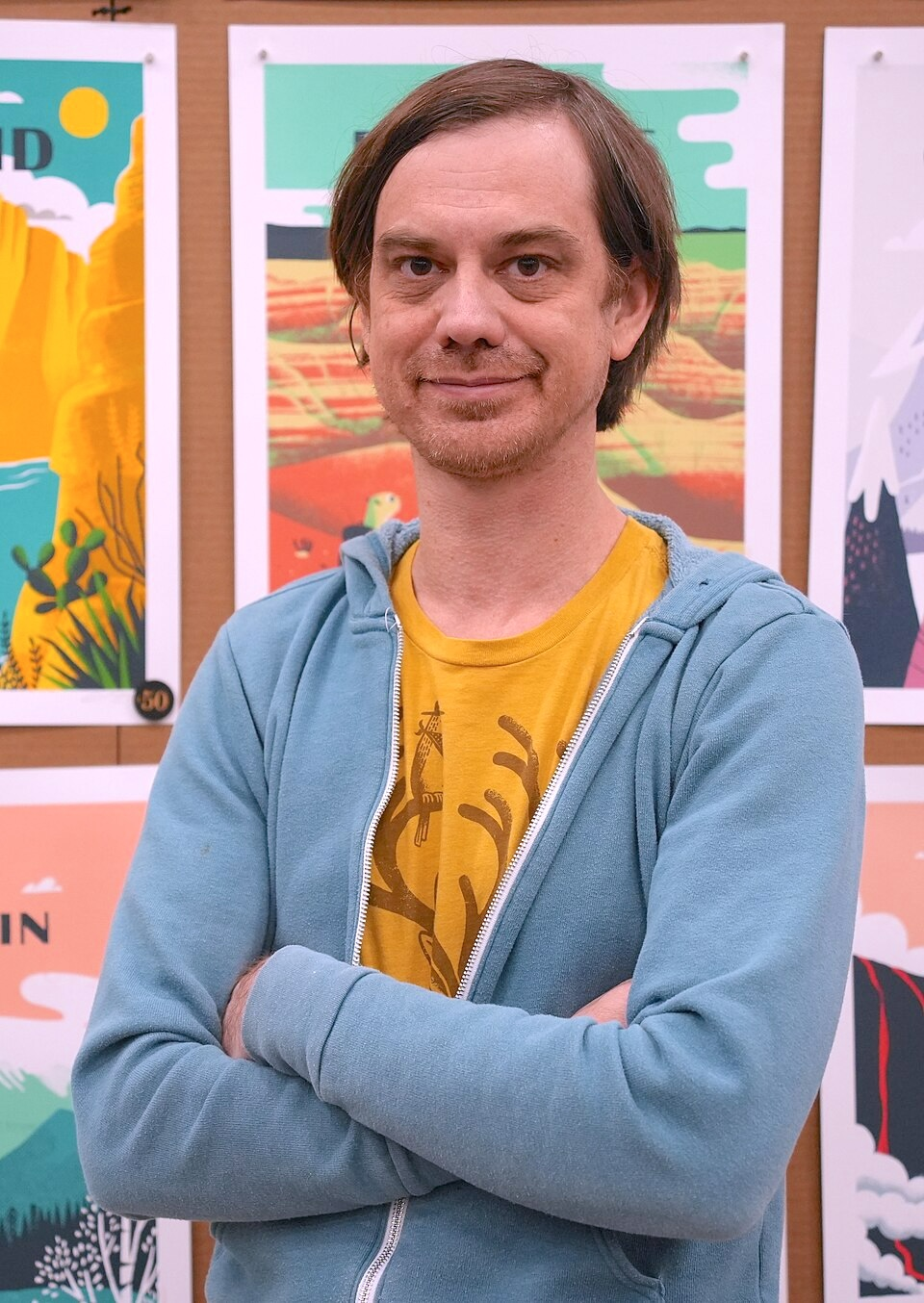
Andrew Saeger ("Factory 43")

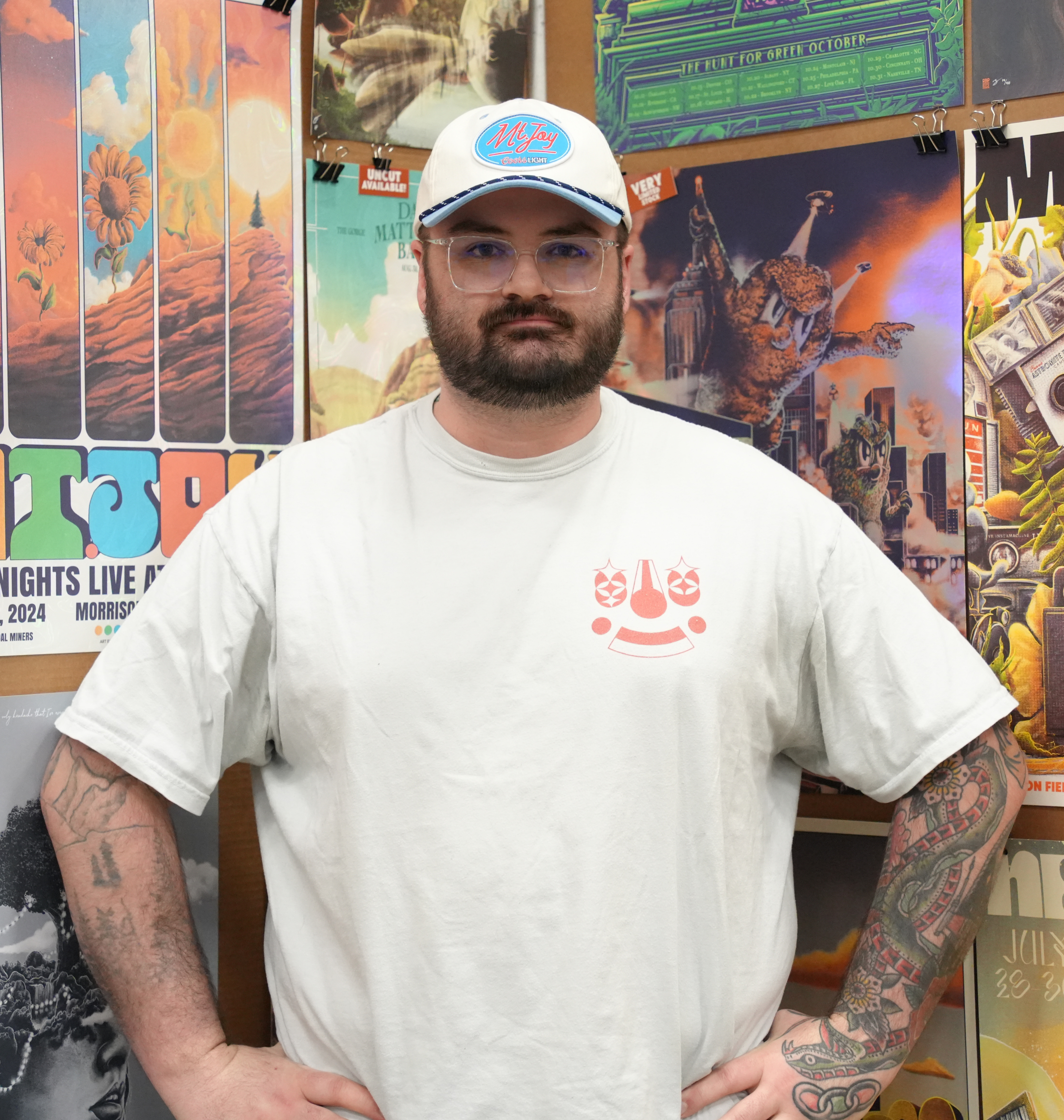
Bailey P. Race ("Railey Bace")

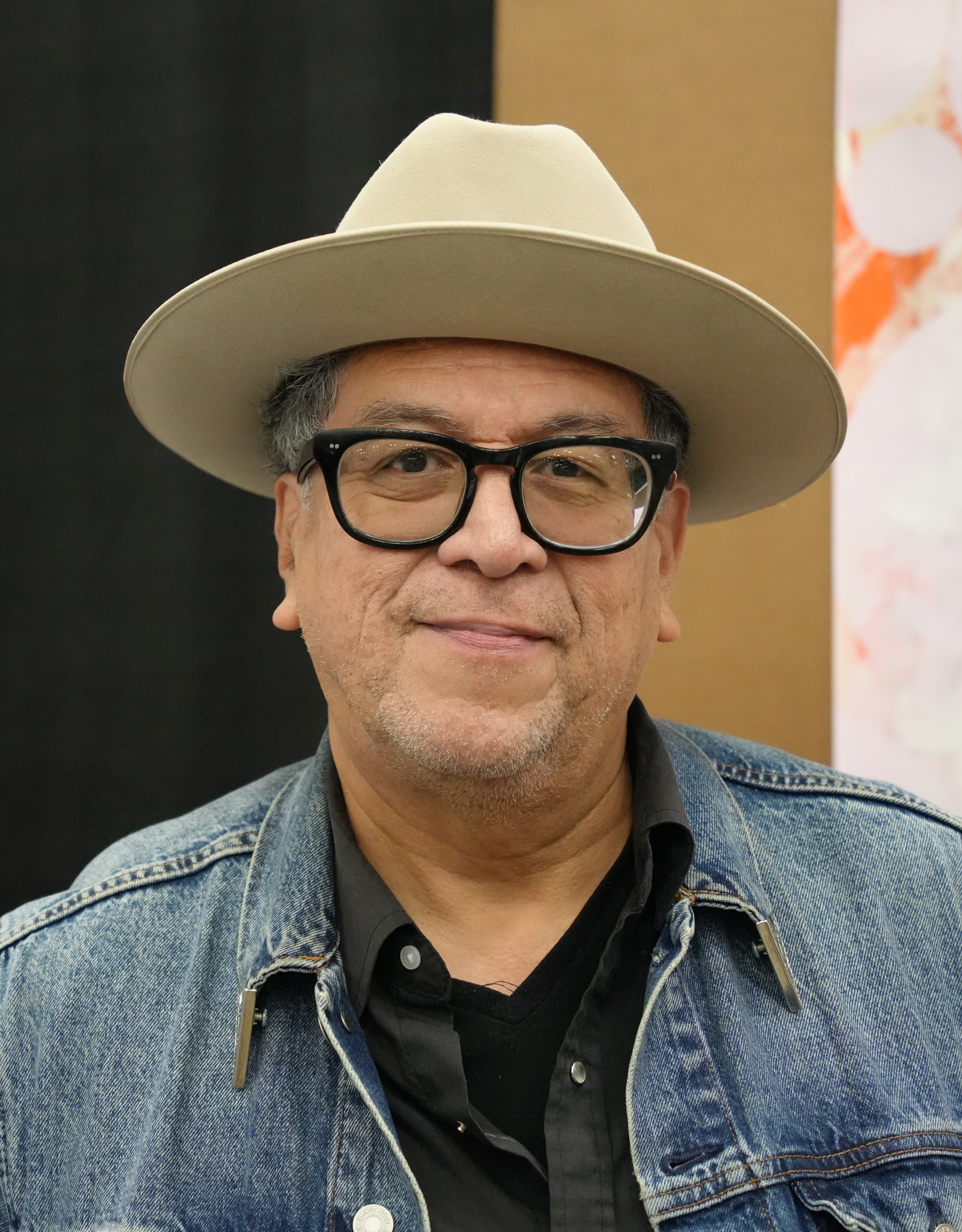
Carlos Hernandez

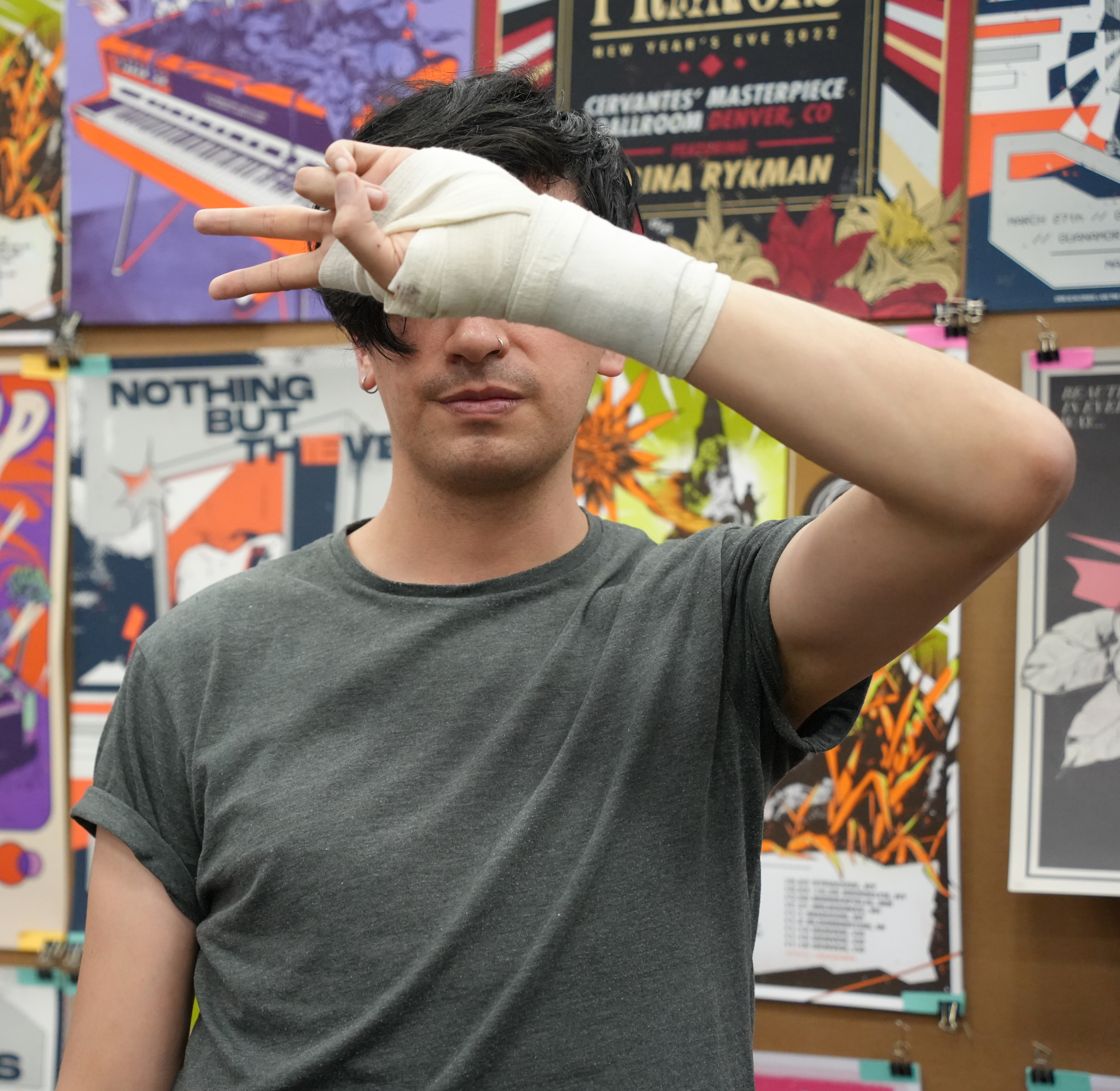
Cristian Alarcón D. ("Cris.is.in.crisis")

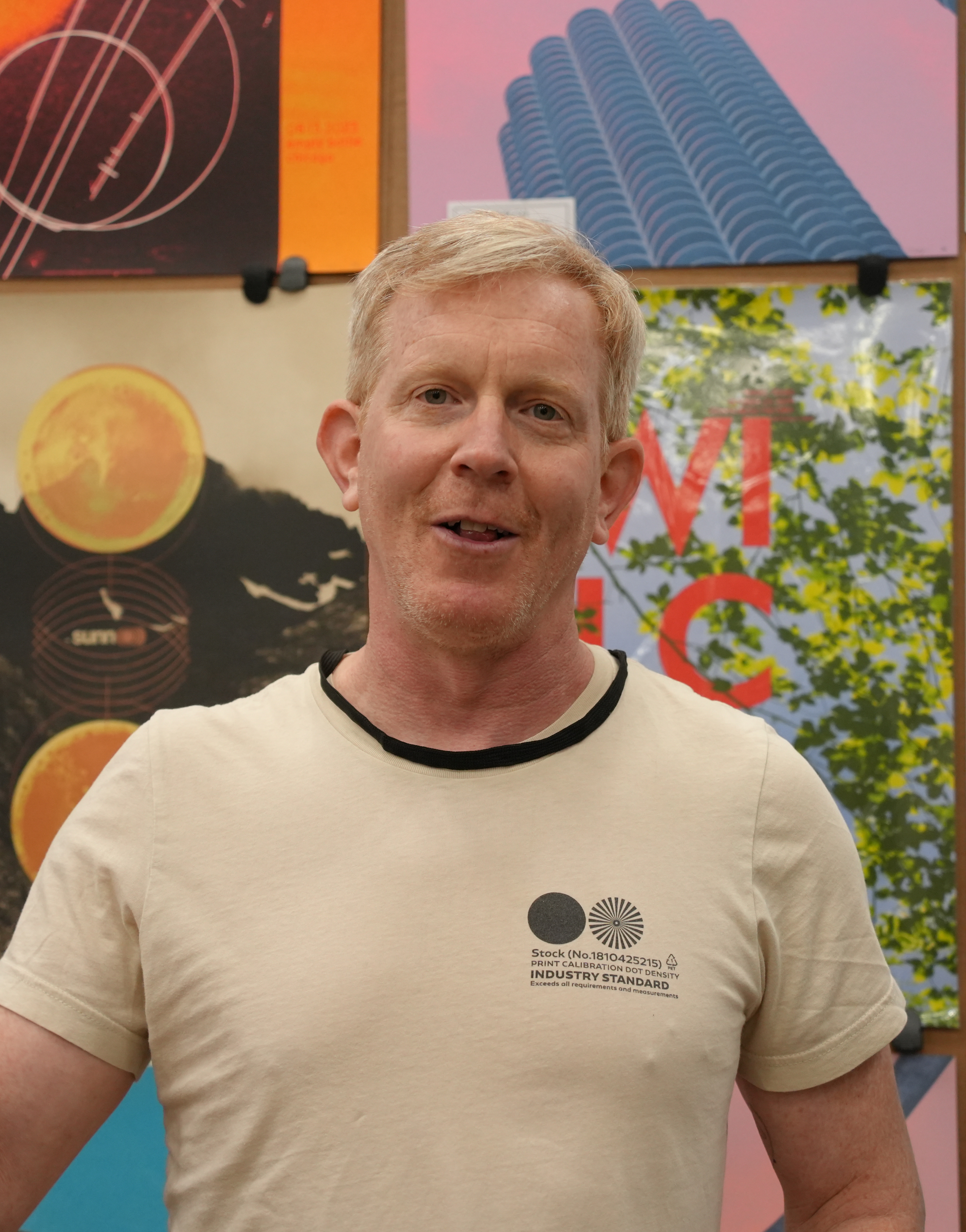
Dan MacAdam ("Crosshair")

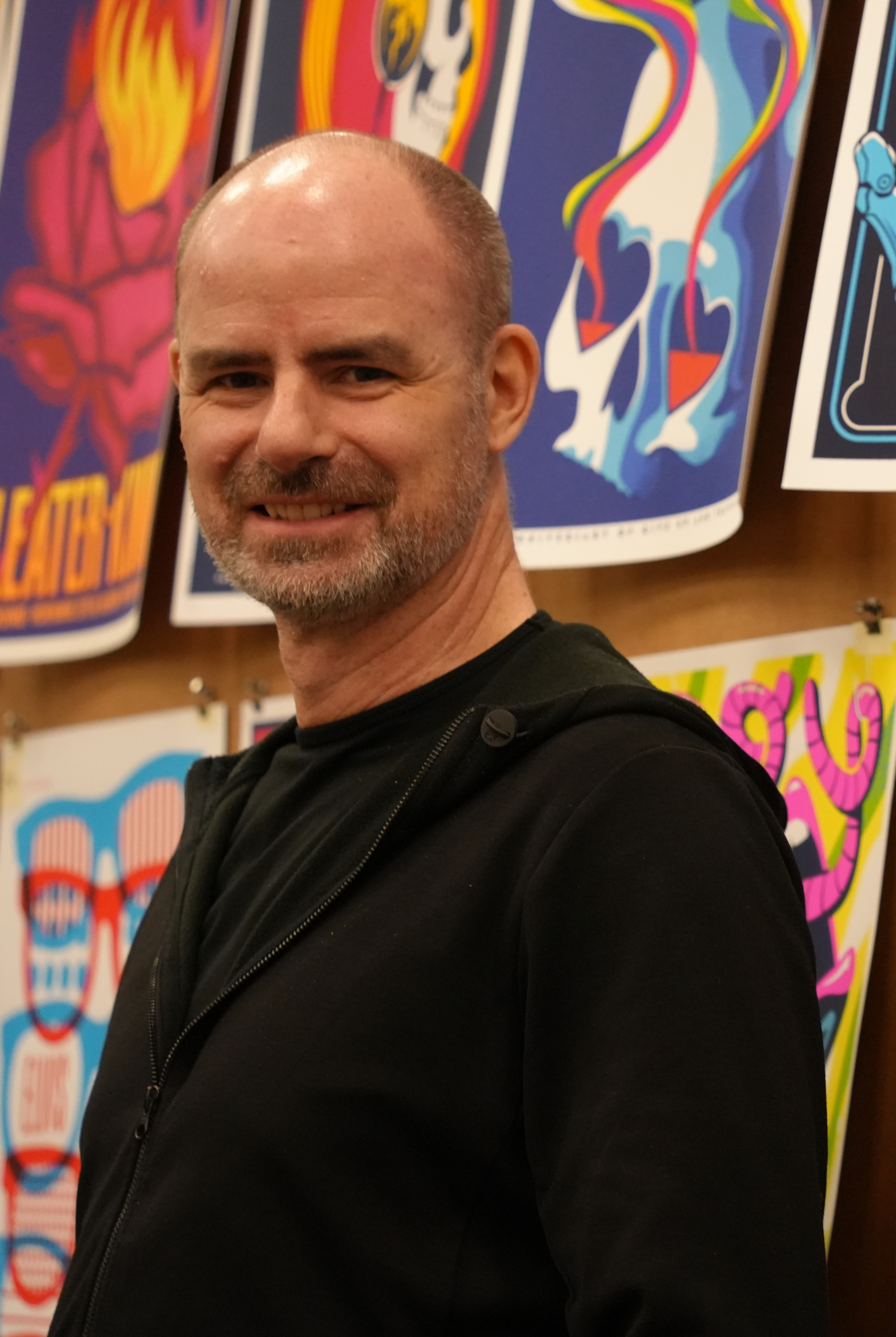
Dan Stiles

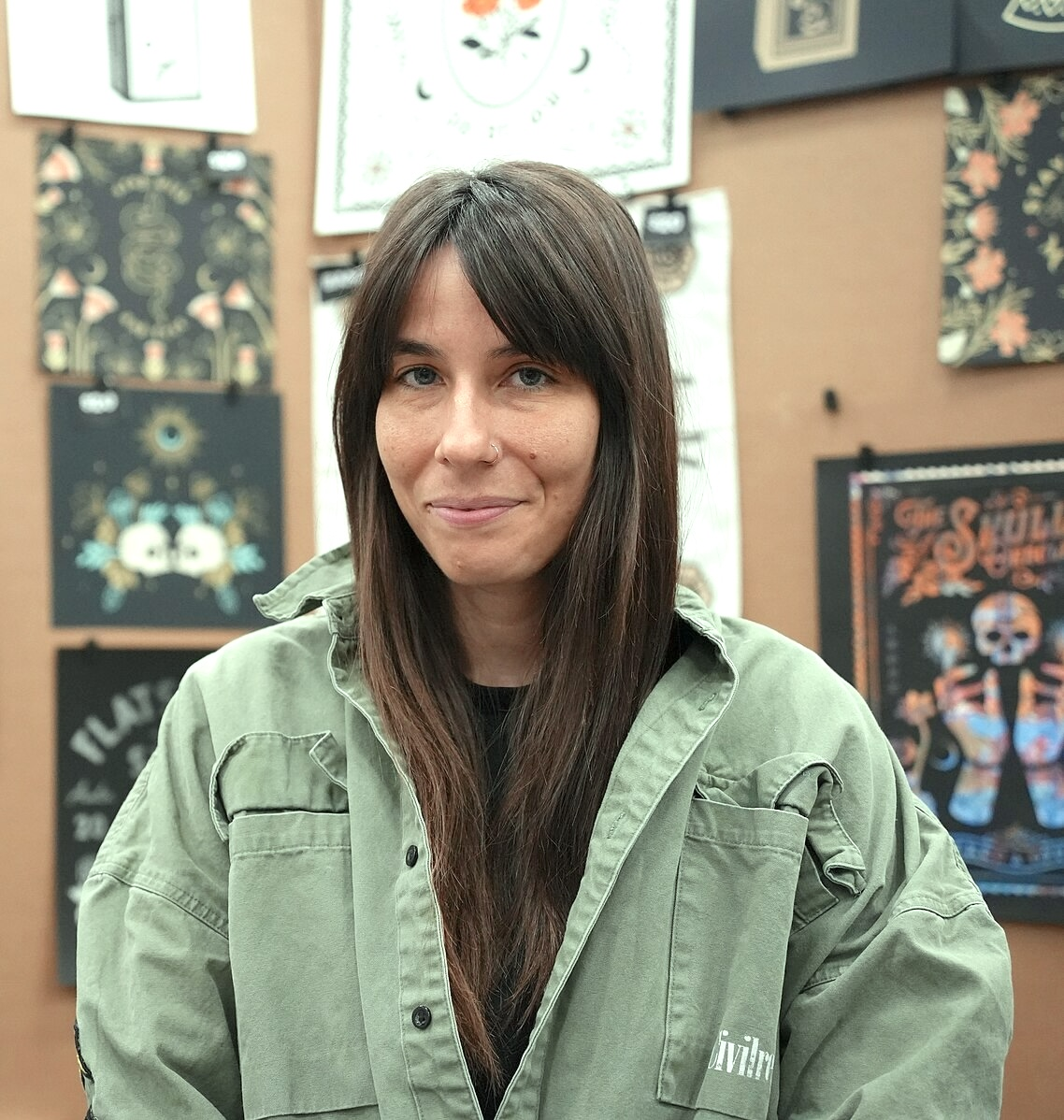
Daphna Sebbane

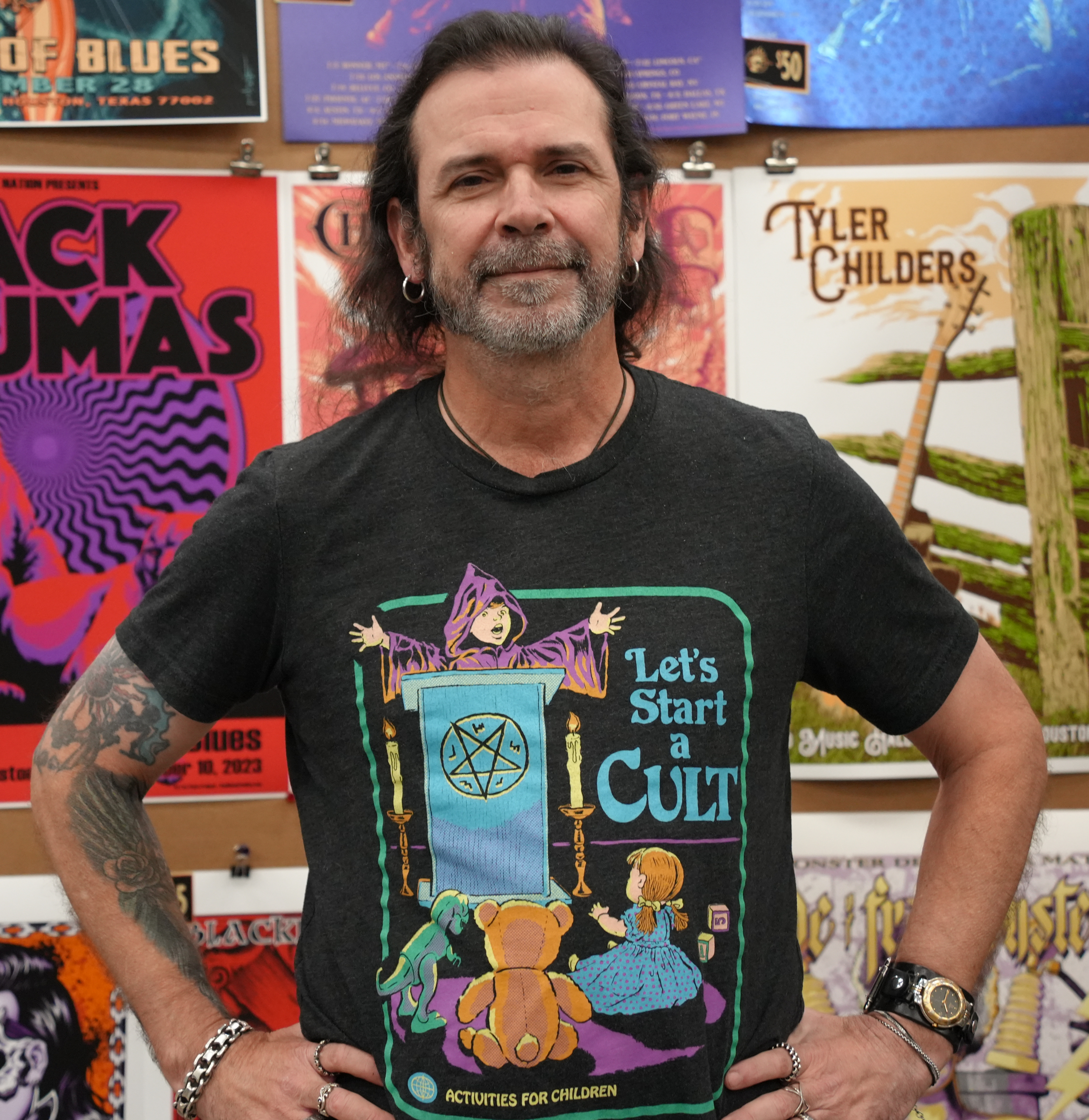
Flynn Prejean ("BadMoon Studios")

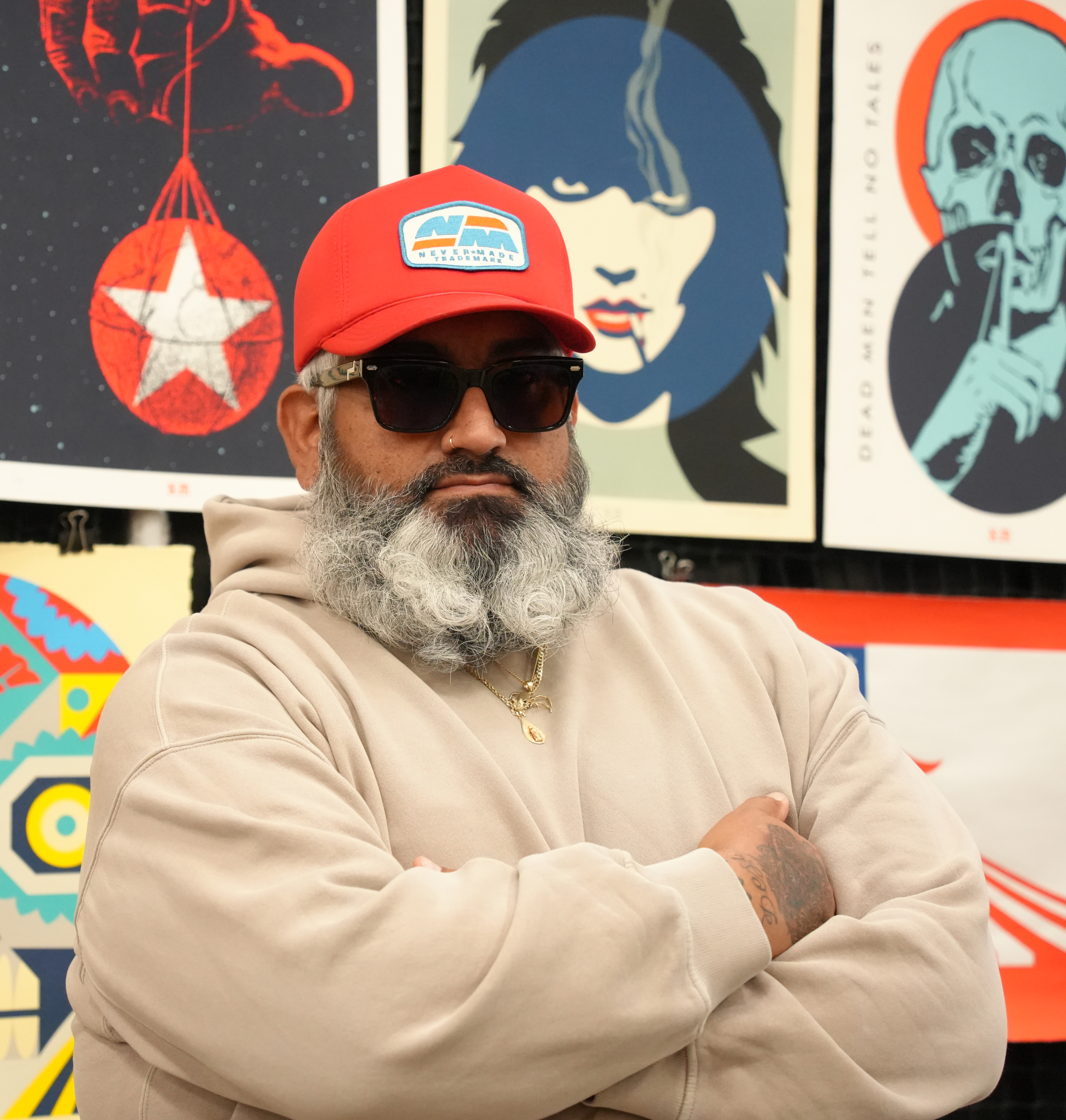
Francisco Reyes Jr. ("Never Made")

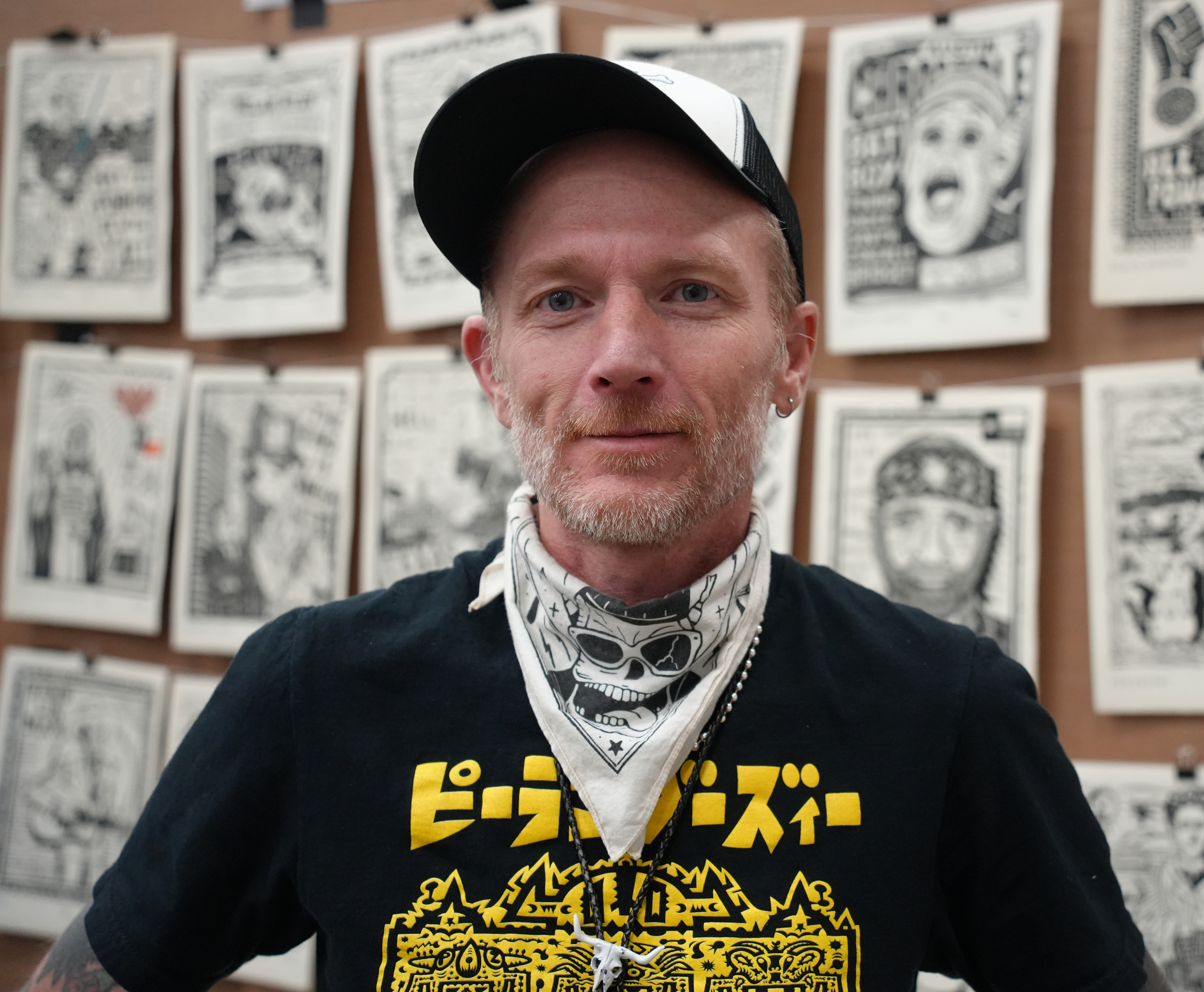
Jackdaw Russell

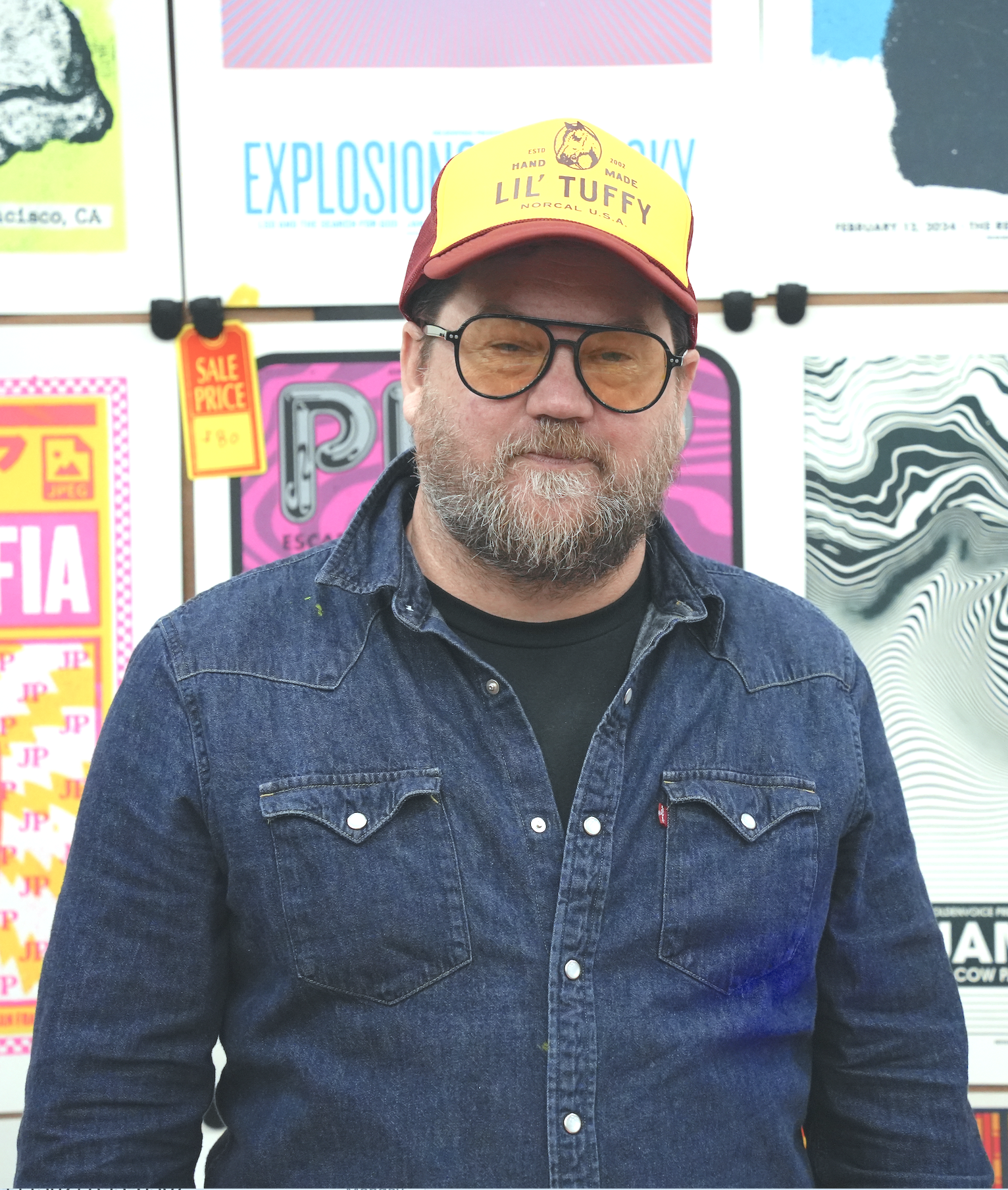
Lil Tuffy (Terrence Ryan)

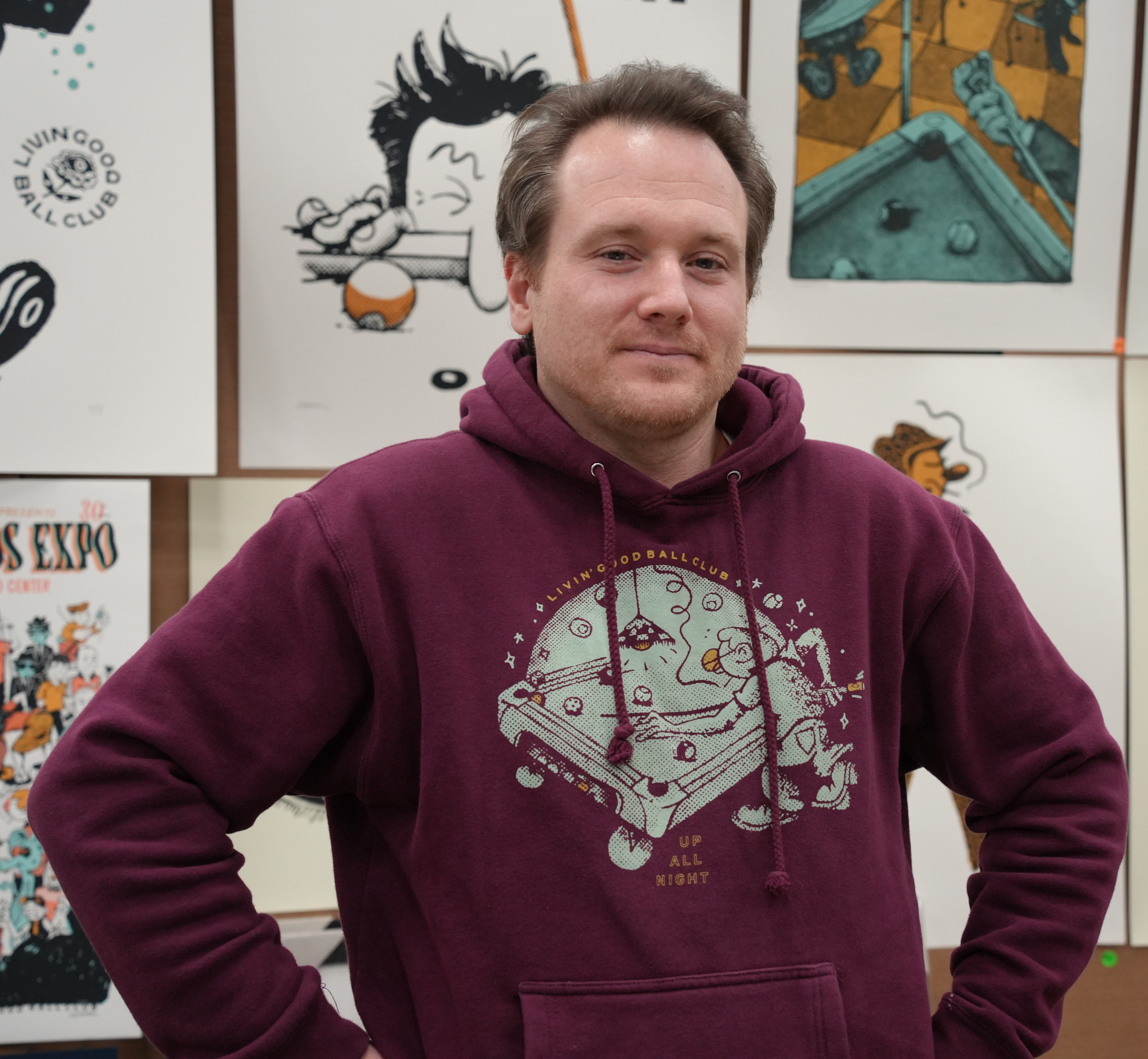
Max Gordon ("Livin' Good")

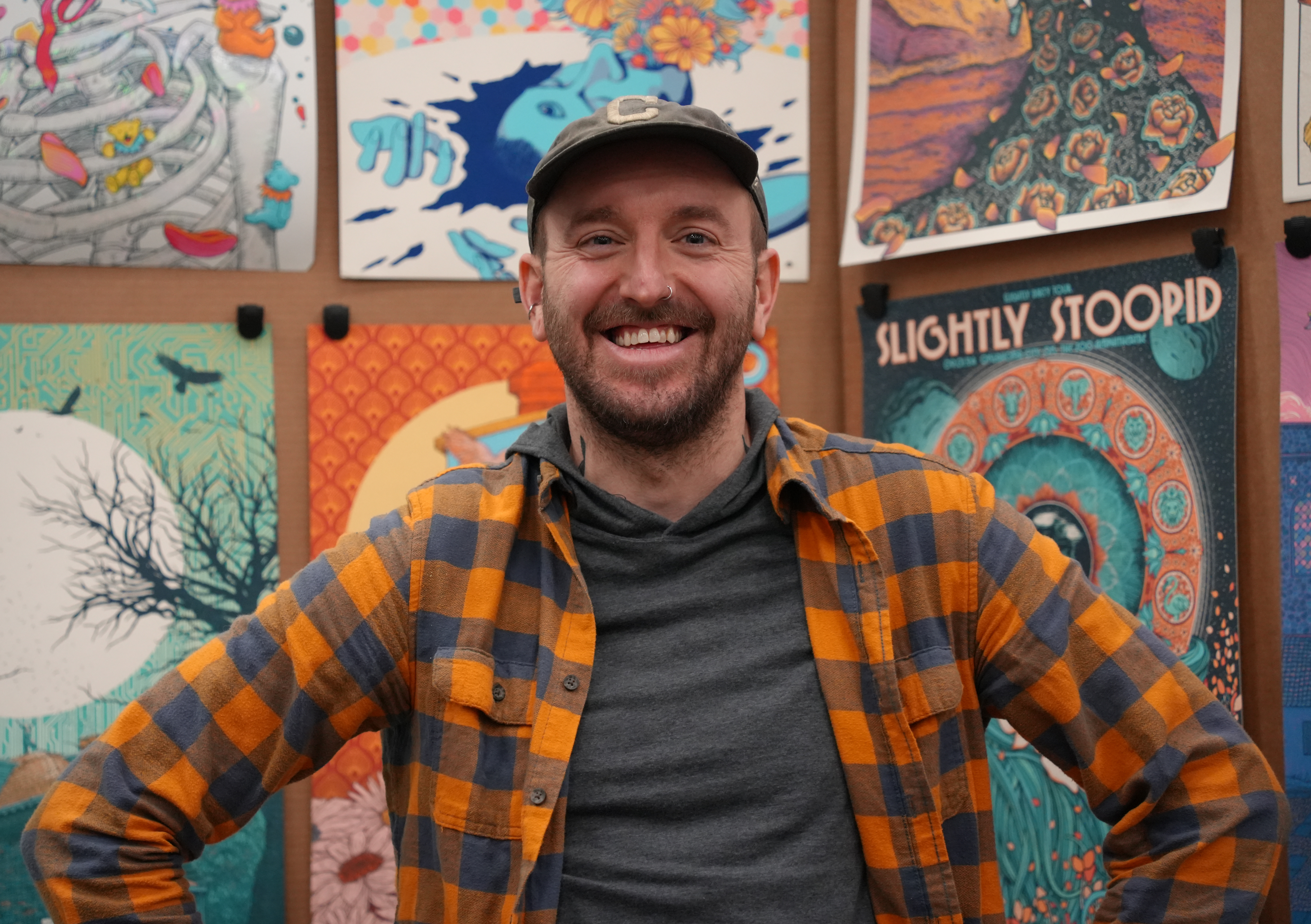
Max Wesoloski ("Max Weso")

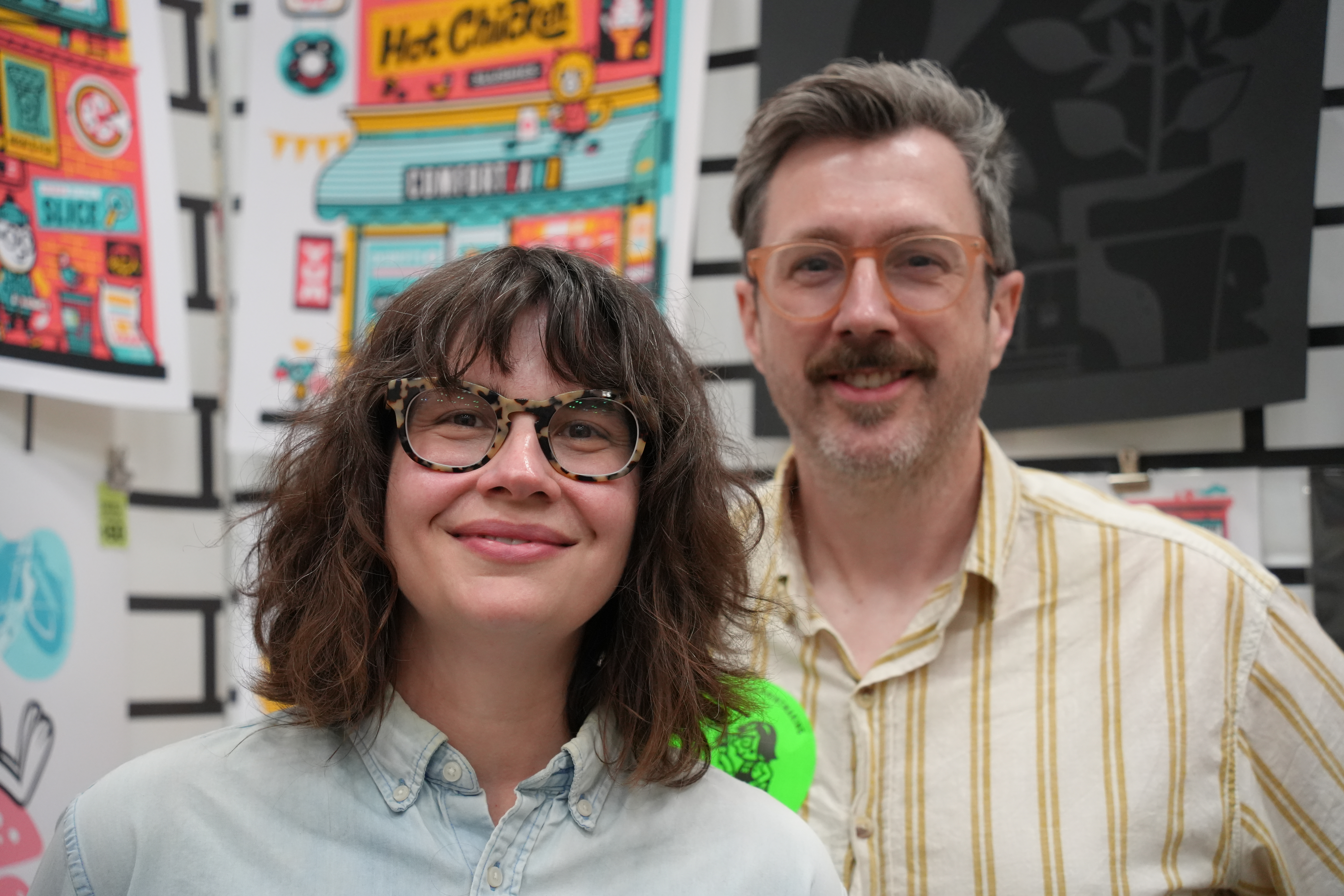
M & JW Buchanan ("Little Friends")

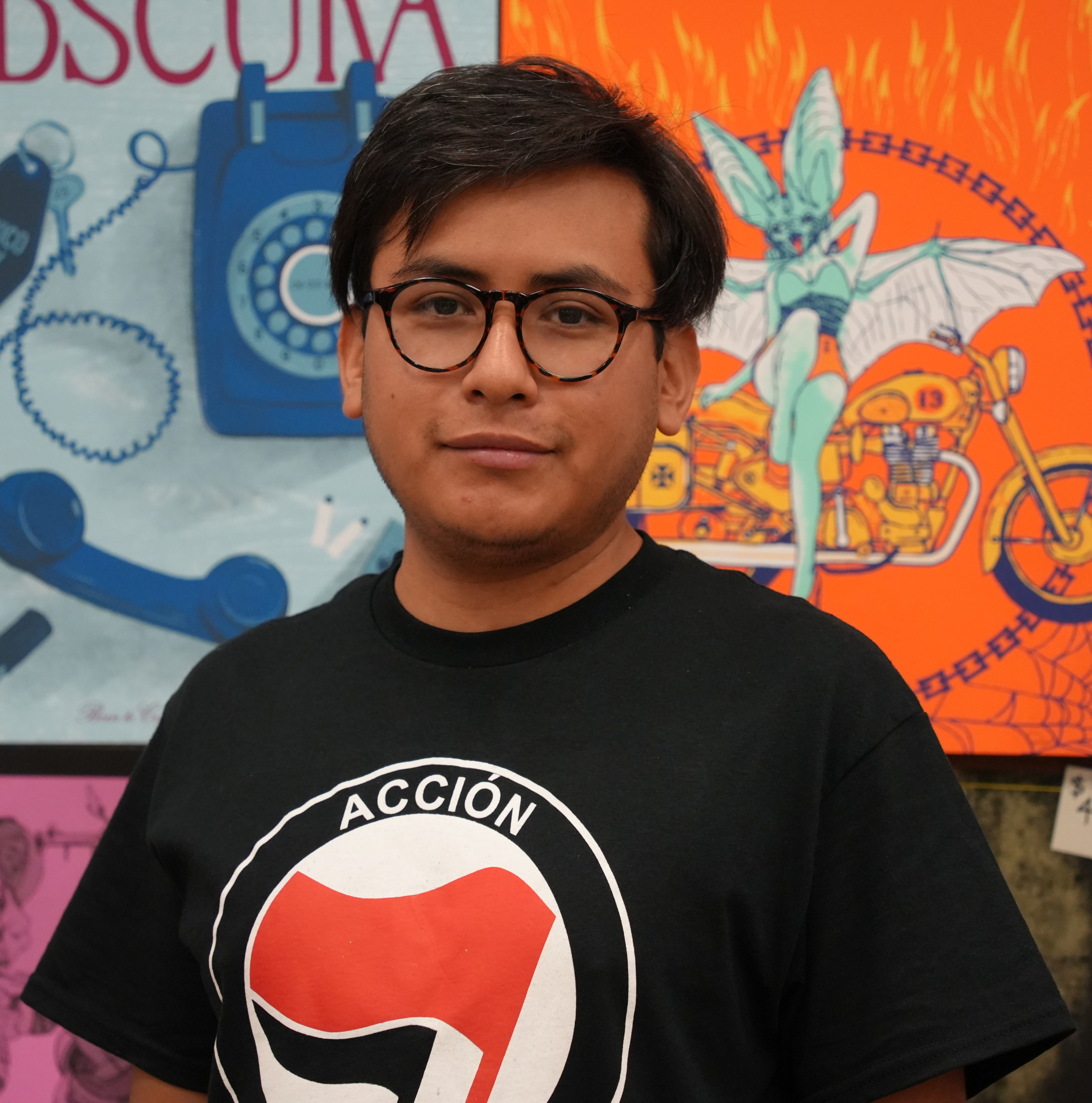
Mercardorama México

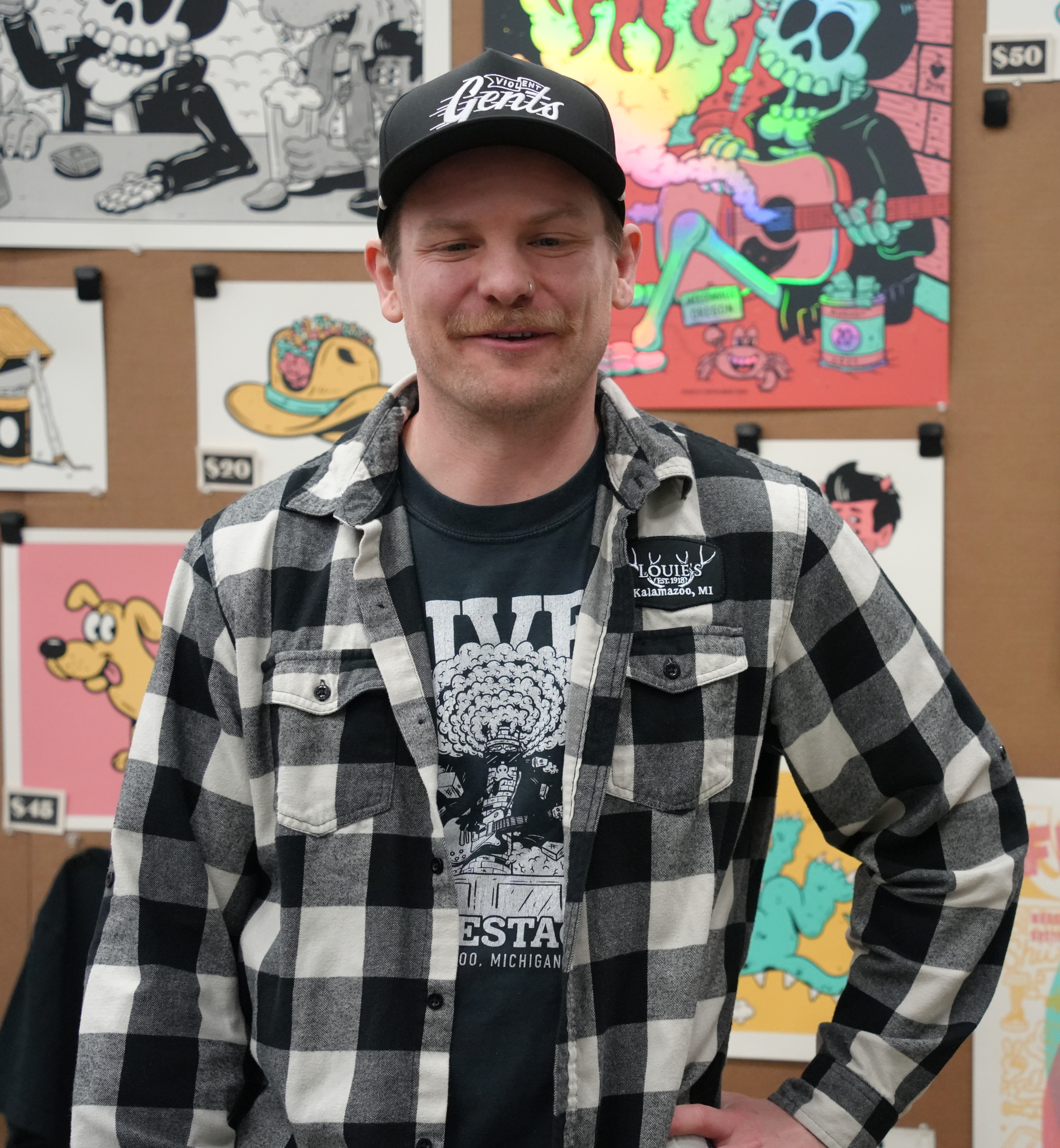
Mike Klok ("Stuffed Brain")

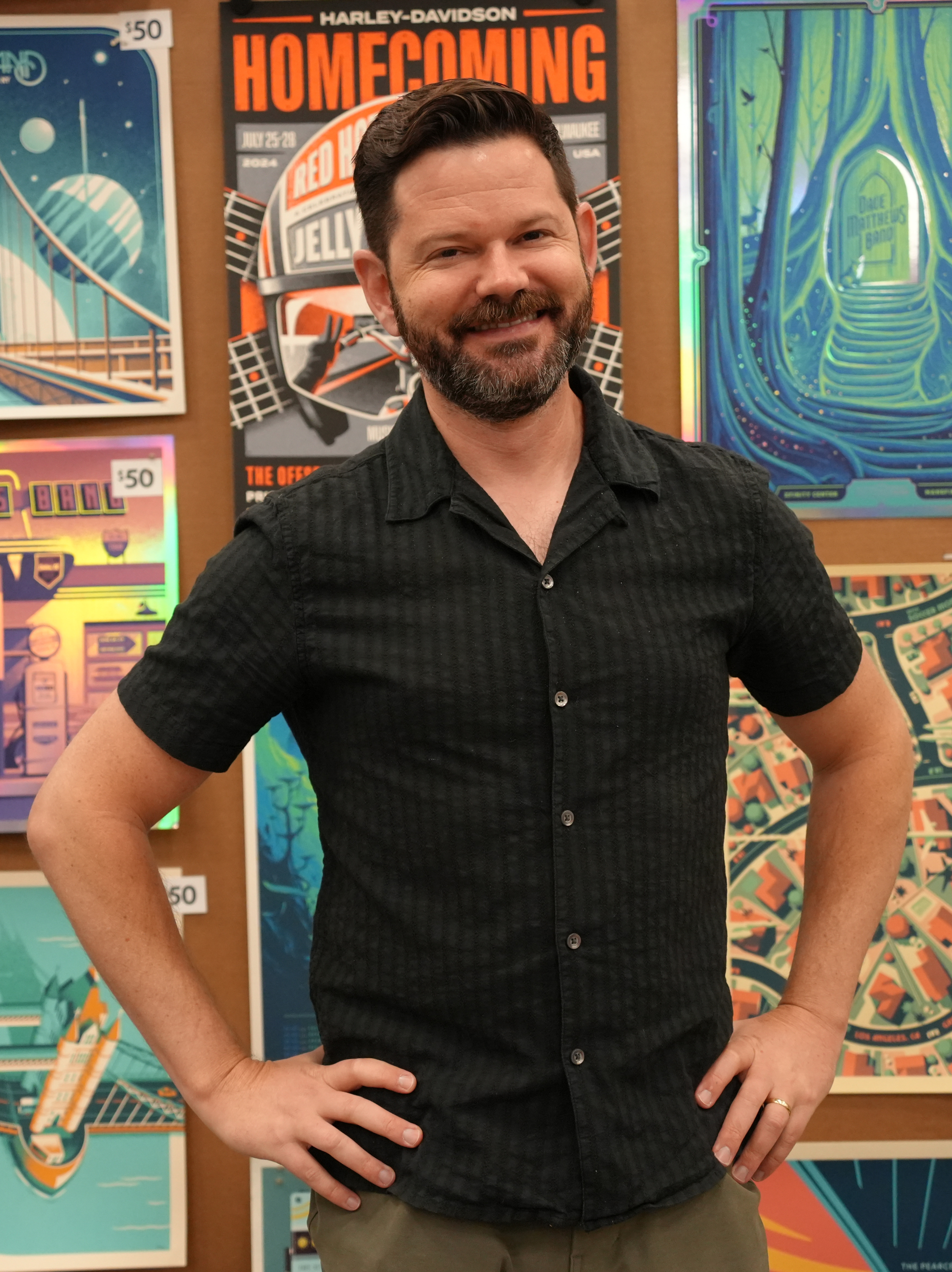
Nathan Goldman ("DKNG")

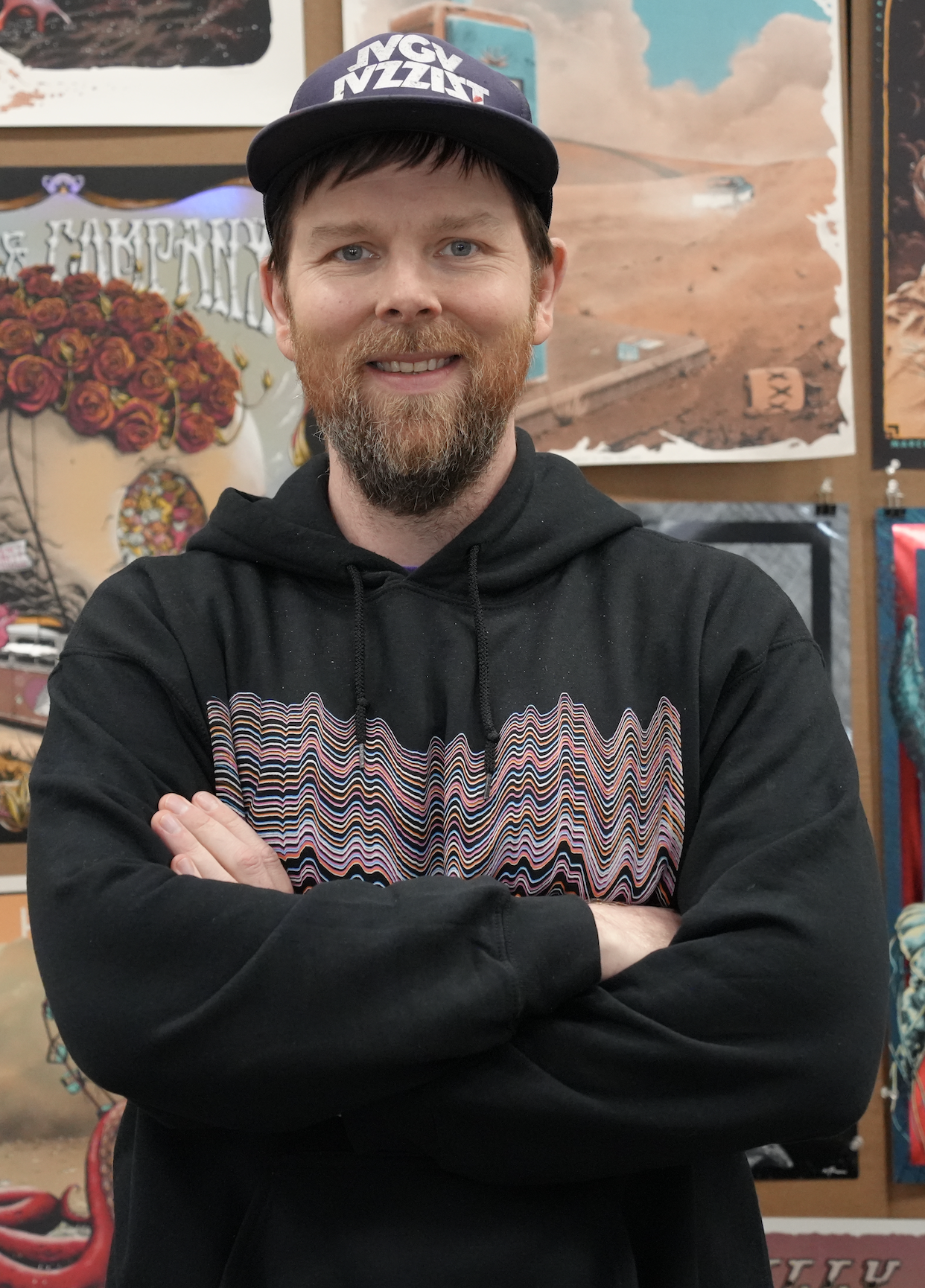
Neal Williams ("Epic Problems")

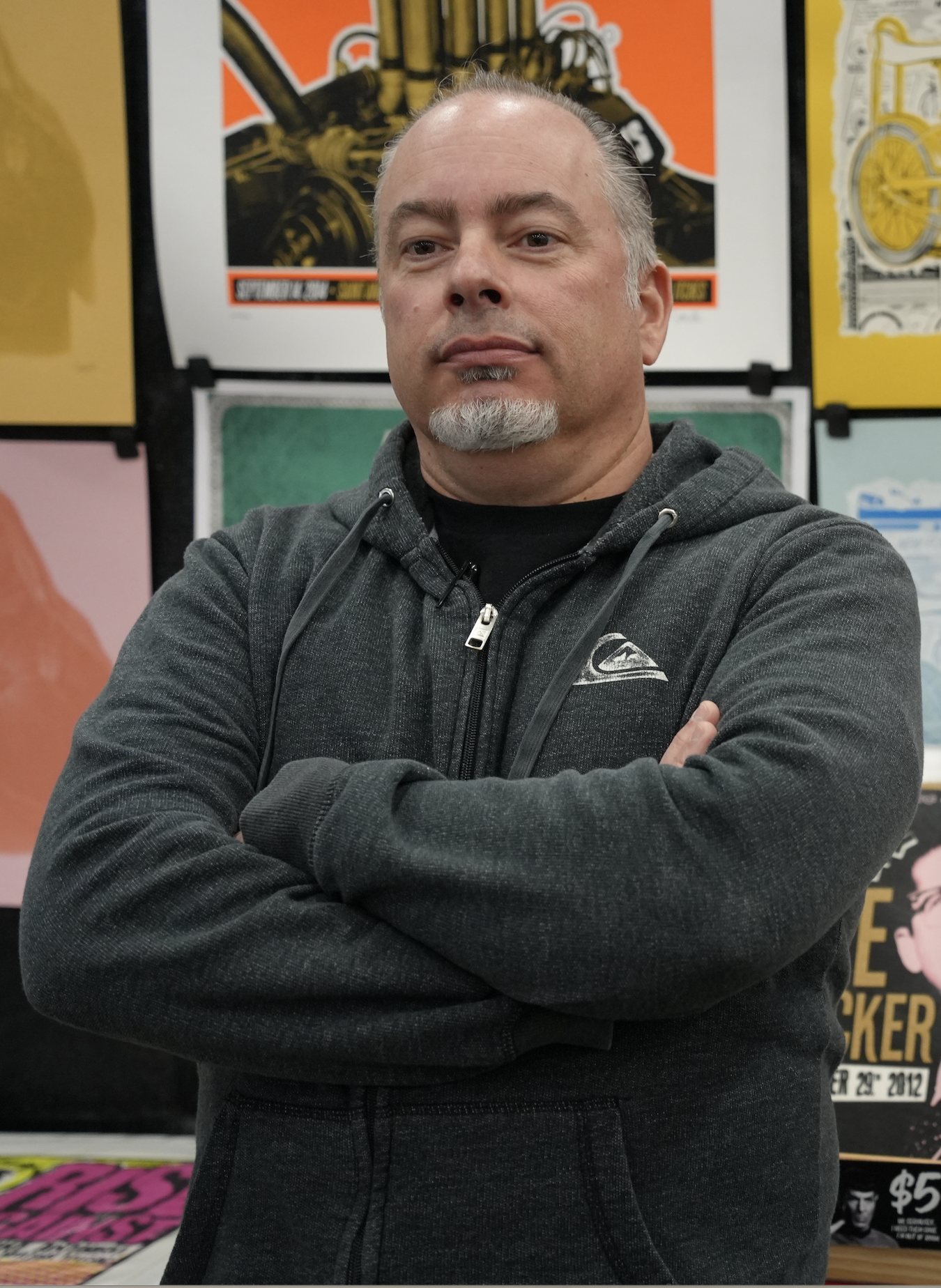
Scotty Roller ("714 Creative")

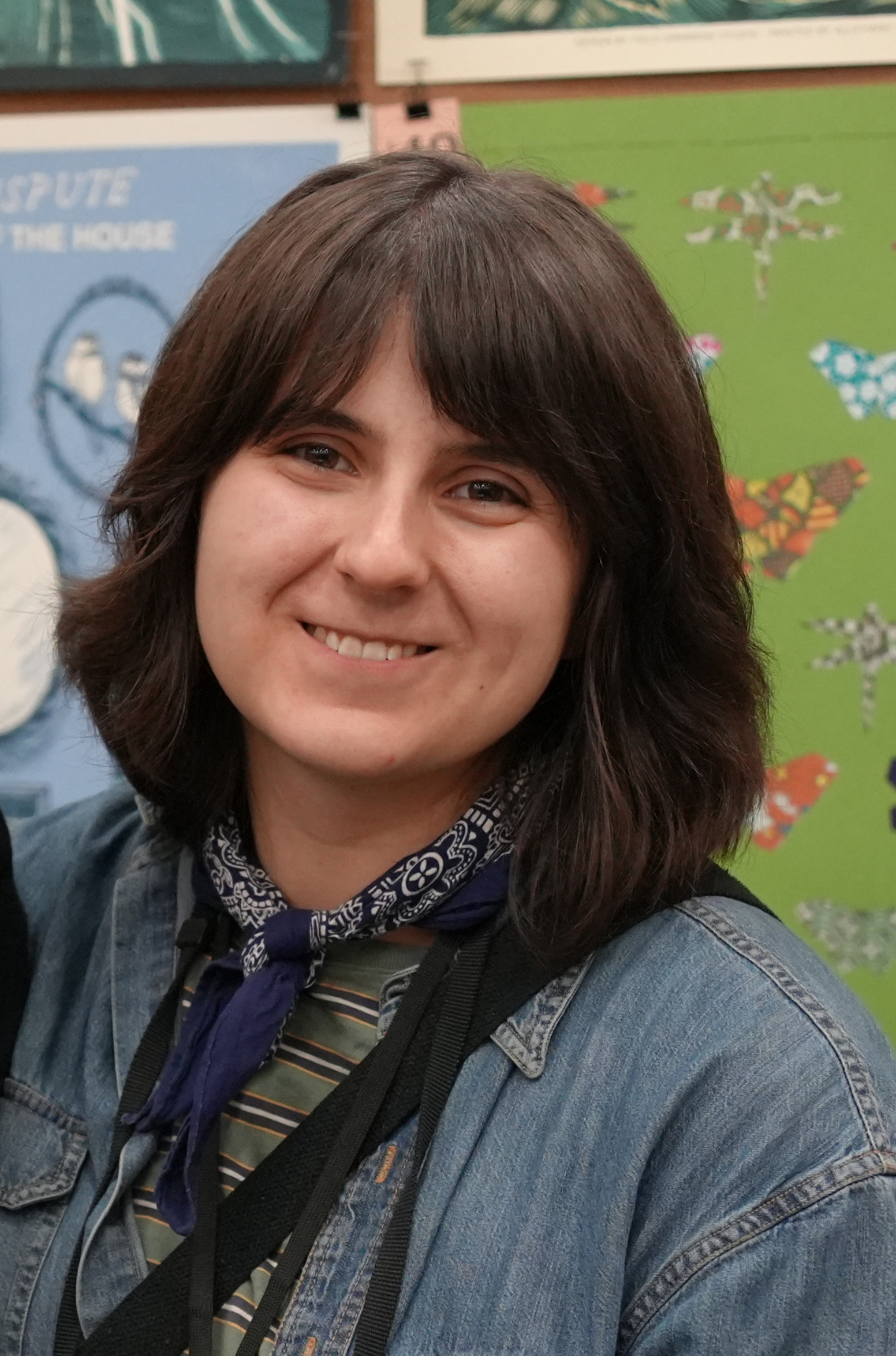
Stephanie Ellis ("Field Sparrow")

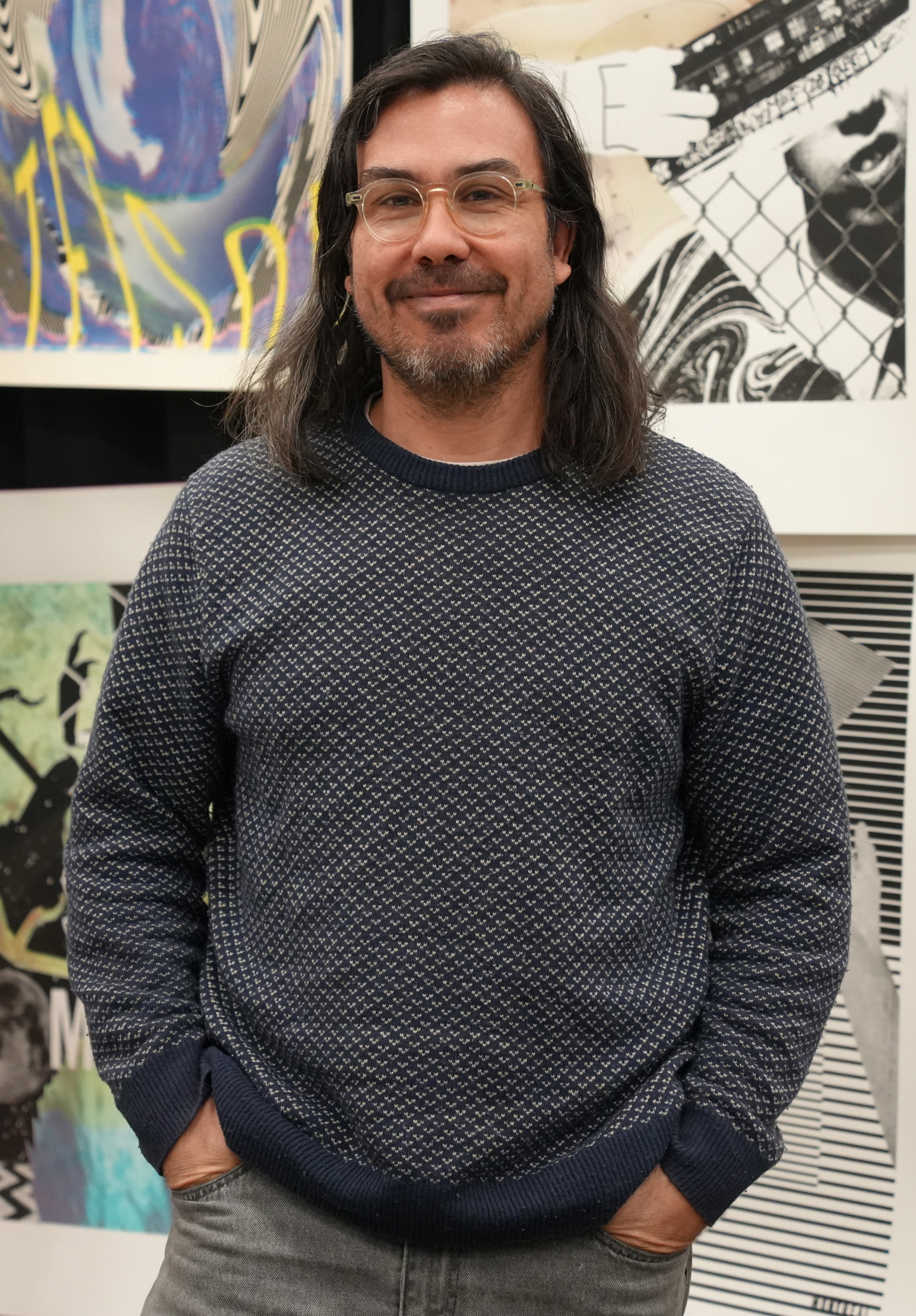
Sébastien Lépine ("SLEP")

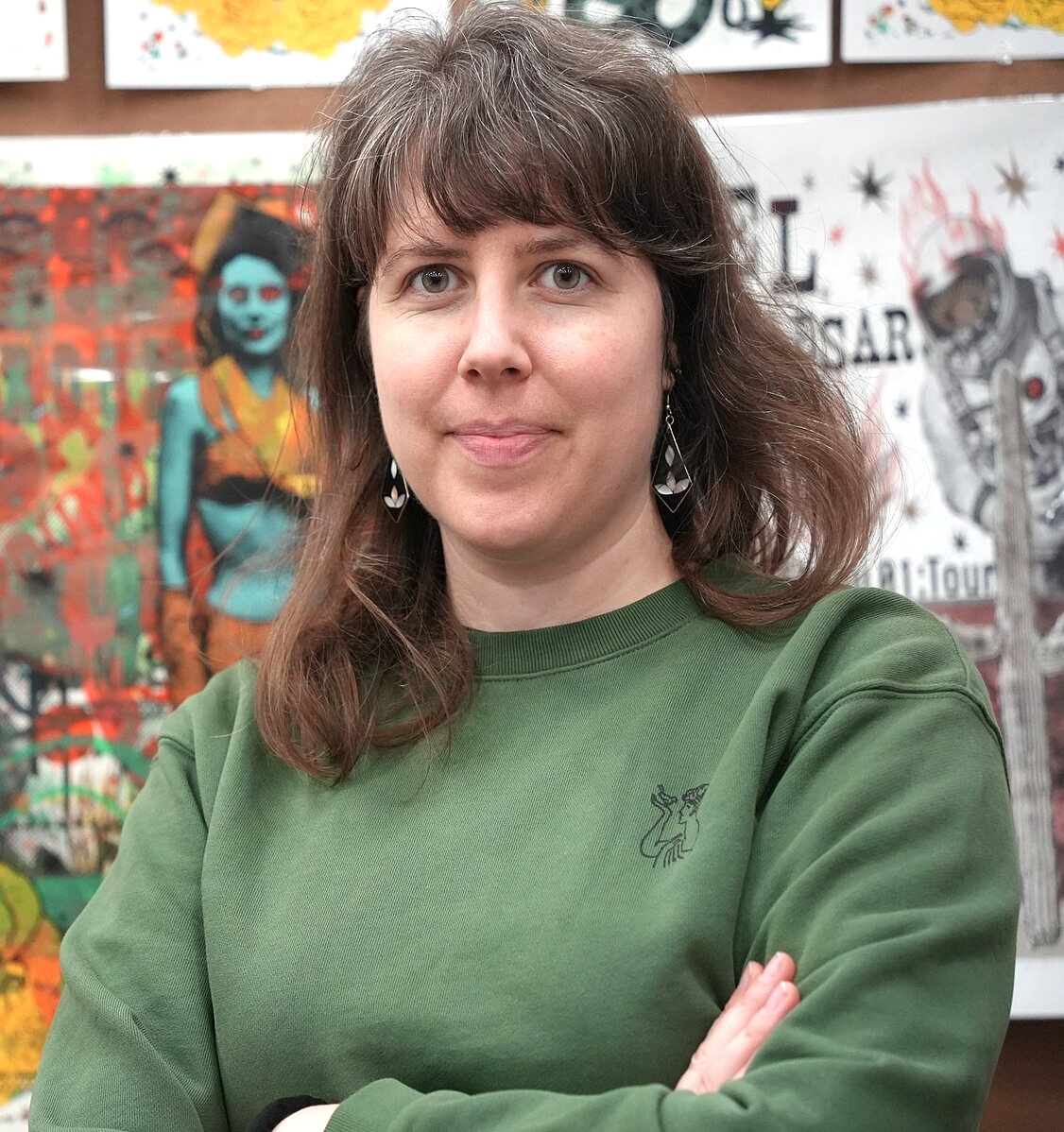
Tess Doyle

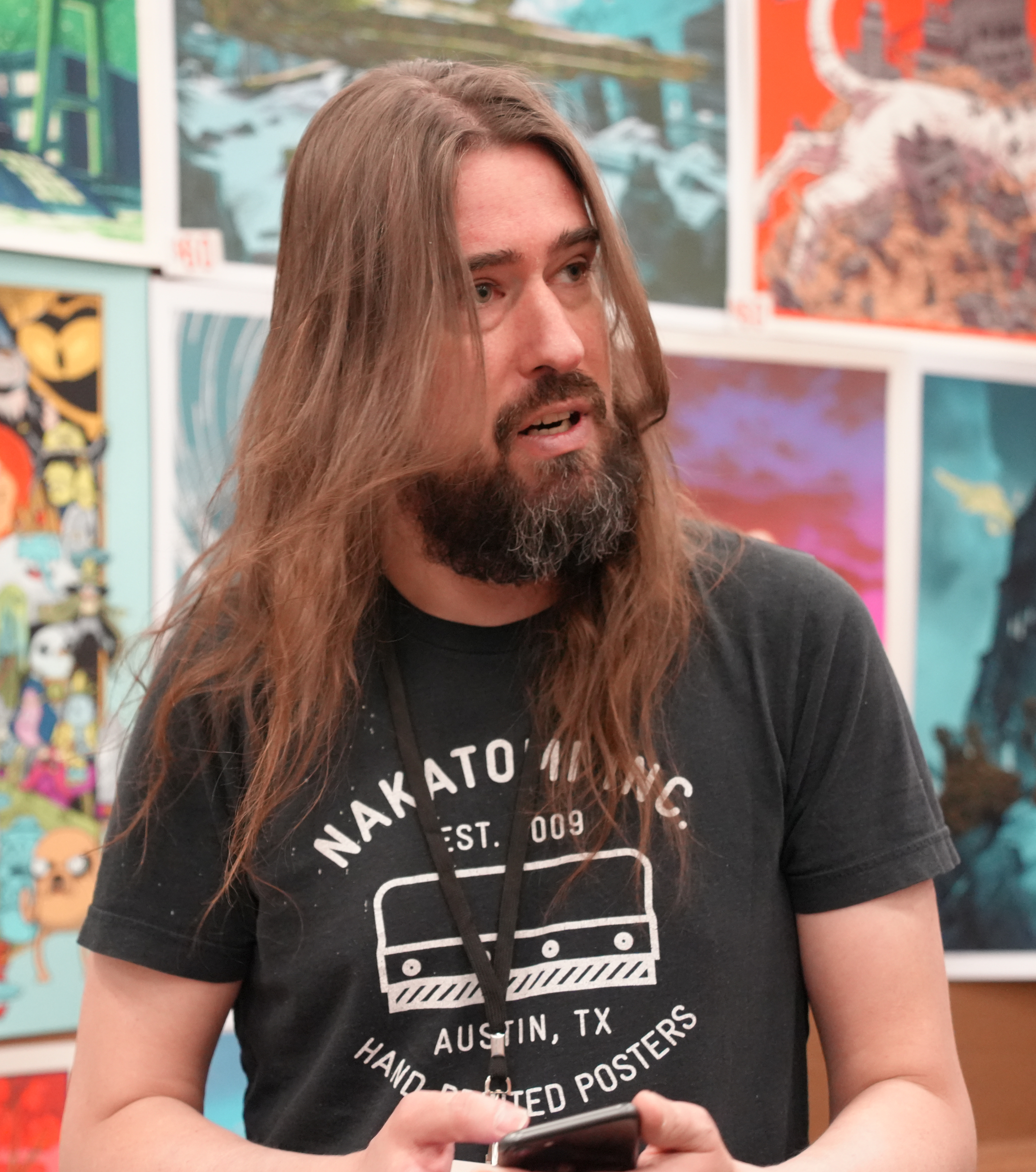
Not Tim Doyle ("Nakatomi")

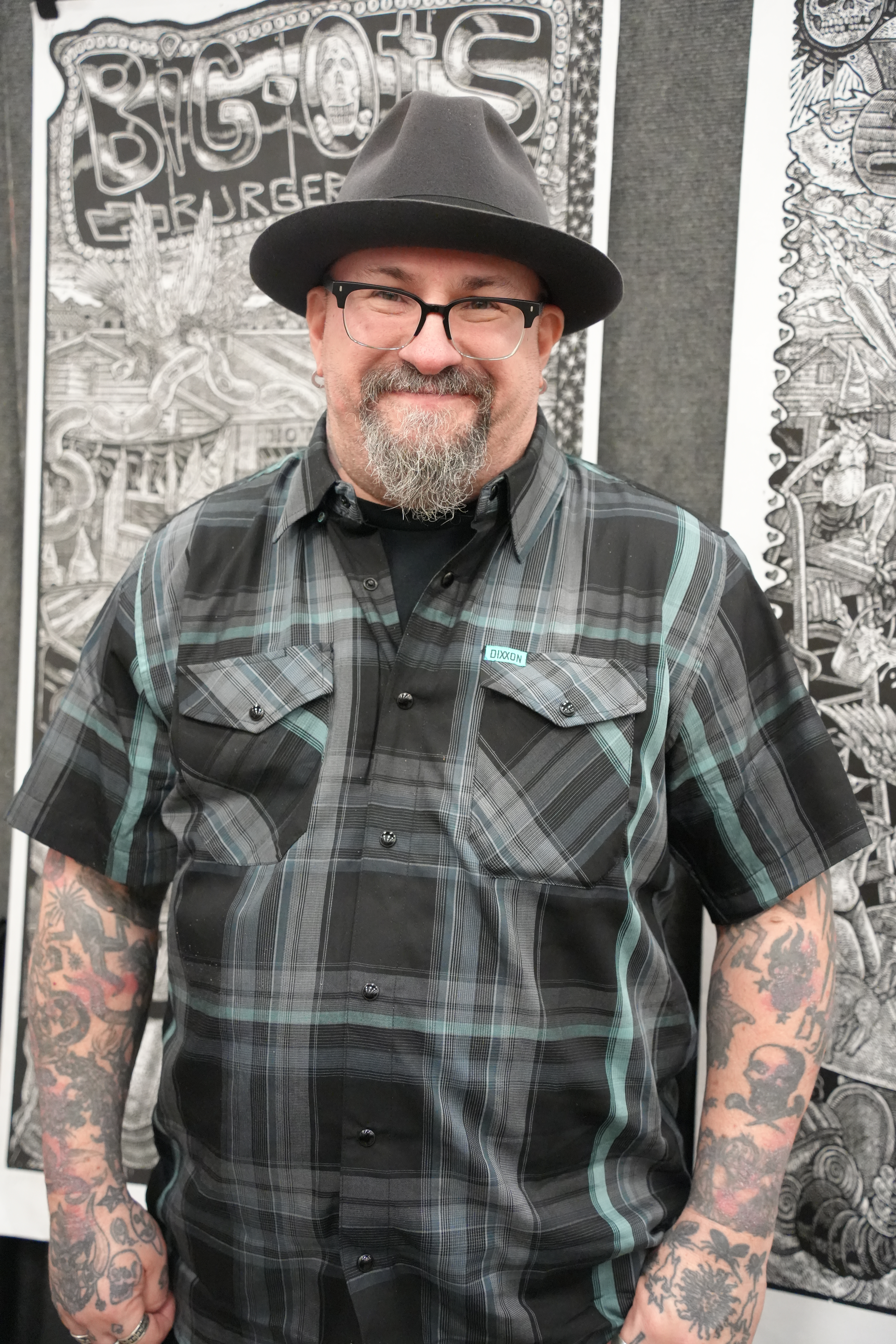
Tom Huck ("Evil Prints")

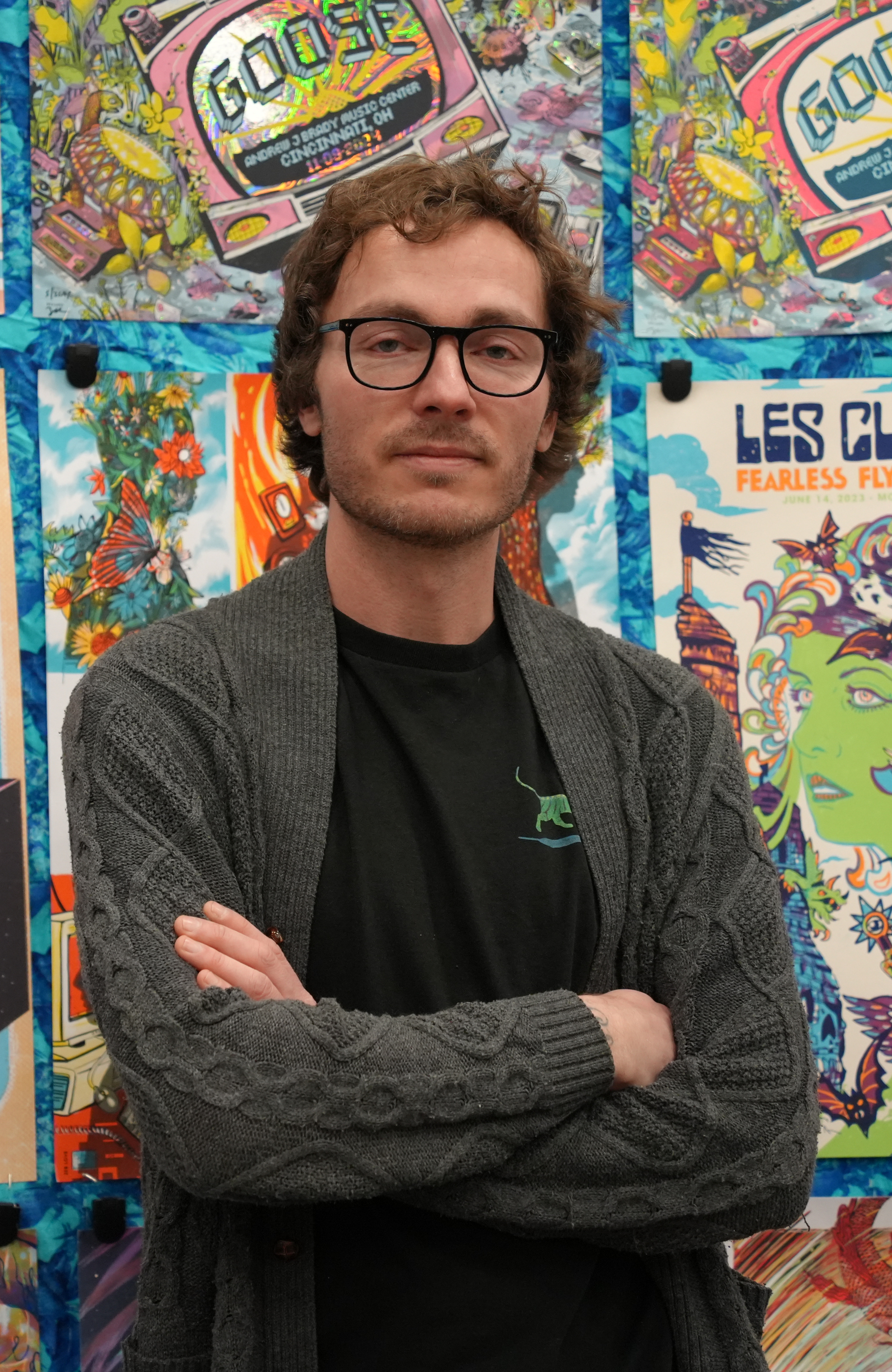
Zeb Love

== See also ==
- Blacklight poster
