= Lil Tuffy =

American printmaker and designer of music posters (born 1972)

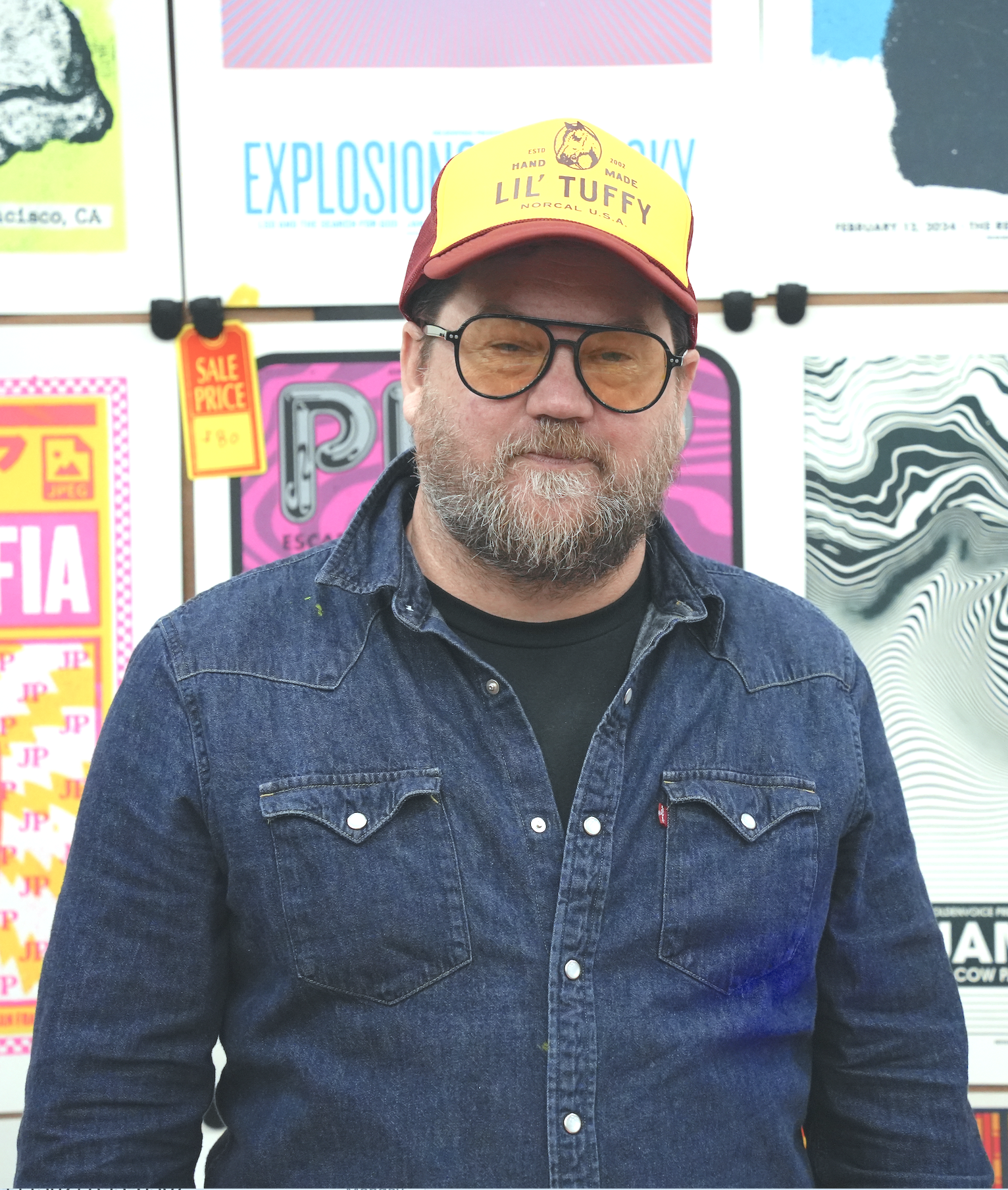
- Lil Tuffy at SXSW 2025
- Known for: Graphic design
- Website: lil-tuffy.com

Lil Tuffy (born July 29, 1972, in Detroit) is an American artist and designer in the field of modern rock/pop poster art, also known as 'gigposter' art, as well as serigraph and fine art production. Tuffy began his career in San Francisco at the Firehouse with Chuck Sperry and Ron Donovan. As a member of the 2000s resurgence of the poster-art scene he has designed posters for a wide variety of musical acts, including Devo, Slayer, Pavement, Queens of the Stone Age, Faith No More, The White Stripes, The Black Keys, Morrissey and many others. His work has been exhibited in the US, Canada, Mexico, Spain, Portugal, Germany, France, Belgium, the Netherlands, Serbia, and the UK and he regularly appears at music festivals including South by Southwest, Bonnaroo Music Festival, Noise Pop, Primavera Sound, Outside Lands Music and Arts Festival, Reeperbahn Festival and more. He is a regular contributor to The Fillmore, The Warfield Theatre and the Regency Ballroom's poster series.

He serves as board member of the American Poster Institute, a non-profit corporation dedicated to furthering public awareness and appreciation of the poster art form and are the organizers of the a series of rock poster exhibitions called Flatstock.

== Influences ==
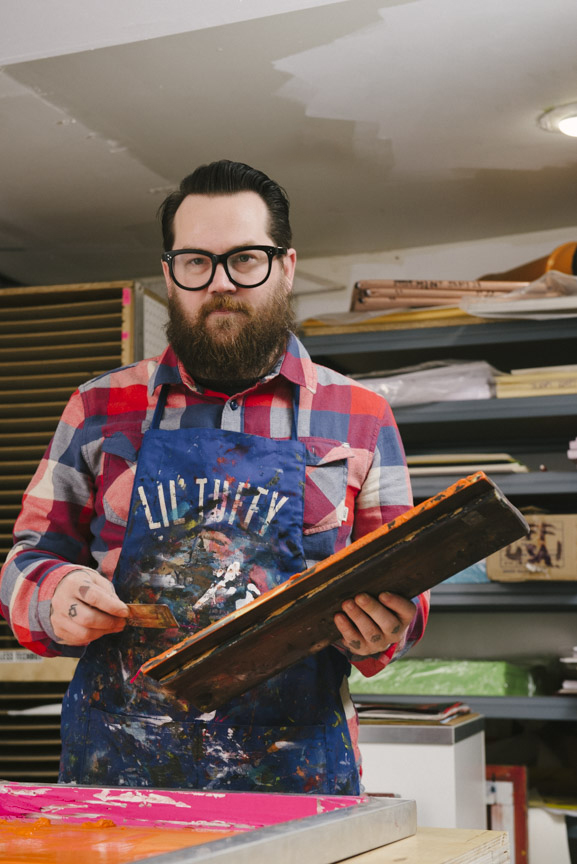
Lil Tuffy in his studio (2015)

Tuffy's artistic style is greatly influenced by Postminimalism, as well as advertising artwork of the 20th century. He has cited Saul Bass, Andy Warhol and Art Chantry as major influences. Although he works in a variety of styles, it primarily incorporates limited color palettes, simple typography and the use of negative space.

== Mentions ==
Tuffy's artwork has been featured in various books including The Art Of Modern Rock, Panda Meat Vol. 1, SWAG 2: Rock Posters Of The 90's and Beyond, Rock Paper Show, Gigposters Vol.1: Rock Show Art Of The 21st Century, and Show Posters. He is featured in 2012 documentary Just Like Being There and his posters were used as set dressing for the Lindsay Lohan movie Just My Luck and the television shows Looking and Sense8.
