= Lil Weavah =

- Origin: Atlanta, Georgia, United States
- Genres: Hip hop
- Occupations: songwriter, actor, record producer
- Instruments: Keyboards, sampler
- Years active: 2004–2006

== Biography ==
Lil Weavah is an American writer and producer from Atlanta, Georgia who has contributed to the background production of TV shows and films.
