= Things Are Really Great Here, Sort Of... =

Studio album by Andrew Bird
- Released: June 3, 2014
- Genre: Indie folk
- Length: 35:32
- Label: Wegawam Music Co.

Andrew Bird chronology
I Want to See Pulaski at Night (2013)	Things Are Really Great Here, Sort Of... (2014)	Echolocations: Canyon (2015)

Professional ratings
Aggregate scores
Source	Rating
Metacritic	76/100
Review scores
Source	Rating
AllMusic	4/5 stars
American Songwriter	3.5/5 stars
Paste Magazine	8.1/10
PopMatters	8/10

Things Are Really Great Here, Sort Of... is the eighth solo studio album by the American singer-songwriter Andrew Bird. It was released on June 3, 2014, through Wegawam Music Co.

The album is a collection of covers of the Handsome Family, an American band Bird knows personally and professionally, having toured and collaborated. Previous covers of their songs include an earlier version of "Don't Be Scared," on Weather Systems, "Giant of Illinois" off the compilation album Dark Was the Night, "When the Helicopter Comes," from Hands of Glory, and "Tin Foiled," on Fingerlings 3. Bird toured with the husband-and-wife duo in 2013.

== Reception ==
The album received a Metacritic score of 76 based on 12 reviews, indicating generally favorable reviews.

The album debuted at No. 12 on Billboard's Folk Albums chart, selling around 2,000 copies in the first week. It has sold 13,000 copies in the US as of March 2016.

== Track listing ==
No.	Title	Length
1.	"Cathedral In the Dell" (originally called "Cathedrals," from Invisible Hands)	3:59
2.	"Tin Foiled" (originally from Milk and Scissors)	3:26
3.	"Giant of Illinois" (originally from Through the Trees)	3:31
4.	"So Much Wine, Merry Christmas" (originally from In the Air)	3:31
5.	"My Sister's Tiny Hands" (originally from Through the Trees)	3:44
6.	"The Sad Milkman" (originally from In the Air)	3:29
7.	"Don't Be Scared" (originally from Down in the Valley)	3:21
8.	"Frogs Singing" (originally from Wilderness)	2:44
9.	"Drunk By Noon" (originally from Milk and Scissors)	3:02
10.	"Far From Any Road (Be My Hand)" (originally from Singing Bones)	4:47

== Charts ==
Chart (2014)	Peak position
US Americana/Folk Albums (Billboard)	12

== Personnel ==
- Andrew Bird - violin, vocals
- Tift Merritt - vocals, guitar
- Alan Hampton - bass, vocals
- Eric Heywood - pedal steel
- Justin Glasco - drums
- David Boucher - recording and mixing
- Jason Harvey - design
