= Smothered and Covered =

2003 album by the Handsome Family

Compilation album by the Handsome Family
- Released: 2003
- Length: 48:55
- Label: Handsome Family Music

The Handsome Family chronology
Live at Schuba's Tavern (2002)	Smothered and Covered (2003)	Singing Bones (2003)

Professional ratings
Review scores
Source	Rating
Encyclopedia of Popular Music	3/4 stars
Tom Hull – on the Web	B+

Smothered and Covered is a collection of outtakes, demos and rarities by the Handsome Family. It was released in 2003 by Handsome Family Music.

== Track listing ==
1. "There's A City" - 3:12
  - outtake from In the Air
2. "Sunday Morning Coming Down" - 4:48
  - Kris Kristofferson cover
3. "Prepared Piano #1" - 1:29
  - acoustic piece played by Brett Sparks on a modified piano
4. "I Hear A Sweet Voice Calling" - 3:44
  - Bill Monroe cover
5. "Down In The Ground" - 2:30
  - 4-track demo of the song released on Through the Trees
6. "Cello #1" - 1:00
  - acoustic piece played by Brett Sparks on cello
7. "Trail Of Time" - 3:12
  - Alton Delmore cover
8. "Far Away Eyes" - 4:26
  - Rolling Stones cover
9. "Knoxville Girl" - 4:03
  - version of a traditional
10. "Prepared Piano #2" - 1:04
  - acoustic piece played by Brett Sparks on a modified piano
11. "The Last" - 2:45
  - 4-track demo of the song released on Odessa
12. "Banks Of The Ohio" - 3:26
  - version of a traditional
13. "Cello #2" - 1:15
  - acoustic piece played by Brett Sparks on cello
14. "Natalie Wood" - 3:43
  - outtake from Twilight
15. "#1 Country Song" - 3:35
  - demo of the song released on Milk and Scissors
16. "Prepared Piano #3" - 0:45
  - acoustic piece played by Brett Sparks on a modified piano
17. "Stupid Bells" - 2:59
  - 4-track song recorded in 1993 on cassette
18. "The Weinermobile" - 0:59
  - song by Brett Sparks
