= The Felice Brothers (album) =

Studio album by The Felice Brothers
- Released: March 4, 2008
- Genres: Americana, Folk rock
- Length: 65:29
- Labels: Loose, Team Love Records
- Producers: Jeremy Backofen, The Felice Brothers

The Felice Brothers chronology
Adventures of The Felice Brothers Vol. 1 (2007)	The Felice Brothers (2008)	Yonder Is The Clock (2009)

The Felice Brothers is The Felice Brothers' fifth album and their first major release. It was released on March 4, 2008, and includes five tracks previously released on their hard-to-find Adventures of the Felice Brothers Vol. 1.

== Reception ==
Professional ratings
Aggregate scores
Source	Rating
Metacritic	76/100
Review scores
Source	Rating
AllMusic	4/5 stars
The A.V. Club	A−
Pitchfork	5.5/10
PopMatters	5/10 stars

The Felice Brothers received positive reviews from critics. On Metacritic, the album holds a score of 76 out of 100 based on 10 reviews, indicating "generally favorable reviews".

== Track listing ==
1. "Little Ann" – 3:24
2. "Greatest Show On Earth" – 5:31
3. "Frankie's Gun!" – 4:06
4. "Goddamn You, Jim" – 3:25
5. "Wonderful Life" – 4:04
6. "Don't Wake The Scarecrow" – 4:57
7. "Take This Bread" – 4:51
8. "Saint Stephen's End" – 4:03
9. "Love Me Tenderly" – 3:40
10. "Ruby Mae" – 4:08
11. "Murder By Mistletoe" – 4:41
12. "Whiskey In My Whiskey" – 3:49
13. "Helen Fry" – 5:44
14. "Radio Song" – 3:51
15. "Tip Your Way" – 5:23
