= All the Right Weaknesses =

Studio album by Brown Horse
- Released: 4 April 2025
- Genre: Country rock
- Length: 43:16
- Label: Loose
- Producer: Owen Turner

Brown Horse chronology
| Reservoir (2024) | All the Right Weaknesses (2025) |

Singles from All the Right Weaknesses
- 1. "Corduroy Couch" Released: 21 January 2025

All the Right Weaknesses is the second studio album by English country rock group Brown Horse, released on 4 April 2025 via Loose Music, in LP, CD and digital formats.

== Background ==
The album was recorded in a Norfolk studio. "Corduroy Couch" was released as a single on 21 January 2025. The band's guitarist Nyle Holihan noted the band's presence in Europe for two months prior to the recording session of the album, stating, "We were pretty much constantly together, spending hours in the van listening to the same music, exploring unfamiliar places and playing shows almost every night."

== Reception ==
Professional ratings
Review scores
| Source | Rating |
|---|---|
| Mojo | 4/5 stars |
| PopMatters | 9/10 |
| Uncut | 4.5/5 stars |

Jack Walters of PopMatters assigned the album a rating of nine, remarking "Despite different songwriters, All the Right Weaknesses, unlike its cover art, does not feel like a patchwork of songs. Instead, it's cohesive with tracks that, through magic-realism imagery, ask the most existential question: what does it mean to be human?"

In a four-star review for Mojo, Andy Fyfe opined, "their quietly grungy country rock has opened up, All the Right Weaknesses riding a deep and easy inner groove where the debut sometimes hesitated to cut loose, landing on a loose-limbed Waterboys-meets-Crazy Horse energy." The album received a 4.5-star rating from Uncut reviewer Michael Bonner, who observed, "Thematically too, these songs all feel connected. The disparity between fiction and reality is a common thread. Other songs seem caught in a form of psychic interspace, a place of dark visions and fever dreams, hovering between something unspoken yet ominous."

== Track listing ==
All the Right Weaknesses track listing
| No. | Title | Length |
|---|---|---|
| 1. | "Verna Bloom" | 3:52 |
| 2. | "Wisteria Vine" | 4:25 |
| 3. | "Corduroy Couch" | 4:24 |
| 4. | "Dog Rose" | 5:25 |
| 5. | "All the Right Weaknesses" | 3:15 |
| 6. | "Holy Smokes" | 2:26 |
| 7. | "Radio Free Bolinas" | 4:35 |
| 8. | "Tombland" | 2:42 |
| 9. | "Curse" | 3:57 |
| 10. | "Wipers" | 4:24 |
| 11. | "Far Off Places" | 3:51 |
| Total length: | | 43:16 |

== Personnel ==
- Nyle Holihan - Guitar, bass
- Rowan Braham - Accordion, keyboards, piano
- Emma Tovell - Pedal steel guitar, lapsteel, banjo, bass
- Patrick Turner - Guitar, fiddle, lead vocals
- Phoebe Troup - Bass, banjo, vocals
- Ben Auld - Drums

Credits adapted from Bandcamp.

- Owen Turner – production
- Scoops Dardaris – mastering
- Emma Tovell – cover art
- Max Kinghorn-Mills – layout
