= Dry Bones (folk song) =

American traditional song

"Dry Bones" is a folk song, included in Harry Smith's Anthology of American Folk Music under the heading "Social Music". On this collection it is sung by Bascom Lamar Lunsford (1929).

The song is also performed by alternative country duo The Handsome Family on their 2003 album Singing Bones. The song also features on Golden Opportunities 2, an EP released by Okkervil River in 2011.

== Synopsis ==
This song's five verses refer to different biblical stories. The first verse refers to Enoch from Genesis 5:21-24. Verse 2 is based on Acts 16:25-26. The third verse refers to Moses and the burning bush from Exodus 3:2. The fourth verse (and the title) is based on the story from Ezekiel 37:1-10. The last verse hints to the familiar story from Genesis 3, although in Lunsford's version what Eve is saying is unclear.

== Lyrics ==
Lunsford's version on the Anthology (recorded in February 1928 in Ashland, Kentucky). This transcription is modified from Judy Cook's published lyric. Lunsford's version differ from Cook's version on several points and these differences are incorporated in the version presented here. (Some passages in Lunsford's rendition are difficult to interpret. For these lines Cook's version are used, but these lines are indicated.):

Old Enoch he lived to be three-hundred and sixty-five
When the Lord came and took him back to heaven alive.

Chorus:
I saw, I saw the light from heaven
Shining all around.
I saw the light come shining.
I saw the light come down.

Paul bound in prison, them prison walls fell down (Note: Here, Lunsford sang "Paul prayed in prison, them prison walls fell down")
The prison keeper shouted, “Redeeming Love I’ve found.”

When Moses saw that a-burning bush he walked it round and round.
And the Lord said, “Moses, you’s treading holy ground.

Dry bones in that valley got up and took a little walk.
The deaf could hear, and the dumb could talk.

Adam and Eve in the garden under that sycamore tree.
Eve said, “Adam, Old Satan is a-tempting me.” (Note: Lunsford sang "A-Satan never tempted me")
