= Singing Bones =

2003 album by the Handsome Family

Studio album by the Handsome Family
- Released: 2003
- Length: 38:36
- Label: Carrot Top / Loose Music

The Handsome Family chronology
Smothered and Covered (2003)	Singing Bones (2003)	Last Days of Wonder (2006)

Professional ratings
Aggregate scores
Source	Rating
Metacritic	85/100
Review scores
Source	Rating
Pitchfork	7.4/10
Encyclopedia of Popular Music	3/4 stars
Tom Hull – on the Web	B+

Singing Bones is the sixth studio album by the Handsome Family. It was released in 2003 by Carrot Top Records (North America) / Loose Music (Europe). It includes a cover of the folk song "Dry Bones", known from Bascom Lamar Lunsford's 1928 version on Harry Smith's Anthology of American Folk Music. In 2014, the album received a resurgence of interest when the song "Far from Any Road" was used as the theme song for the first season of HBO's crime drama True Detective.

== Reception ==
The album was well received by critics: according to Metacritic, the album has received an average review score of 85/100, based on 8 reviews, indicating "universal acclaim".

== "Far from Any Road" ==
Besides its appearance in True Detective, "Far from Any Road" was also used as an opening song for Guns N' Roses' 2014 world tour, and during the ending credits of the 2015 The Simpsons episode "Cue Detective".

"Far from Any Road" also charted on SNEP, the official French singles chart, in 2015, reaching number 61.

It was covered on the Andrew Bird album Things Are Really Great Here, Sort Of….

Jerry Williams and Anna Ternheim recorded a cover for Williams' Ghost Rider album.

== Track listing ==
All lyrics are written by Rennie Sparks, except for "Dry Bones"; all music is composed by Brett Sparks, except for "Dry Bones".

No.	Title	Length
1.	"The Forgotten Lake"	3:46
2.	"Gail with the Golden Hair"	3:16
3.	"24-Hour Store"	4:52
4.	"The Bottomless Hole"	3:16
5.	"Far from Any Road"	2:48
6.	"If the World Should End in Fire"	1:09
7.	"A Shadow Underneath"	3:44
8.	"Dry Bones"	3:16
9.	"Fallen Peaches"	2:59
10.	"Whitehaven"	2:46
11.	"Sleepy"	3:08
12.	"The Song of a Hundred Toads"	2:28
13.	"If the World Should End in Ice"	1:08
Total length:		38:36

== Personnel ==
- Rennie Sparks – vocals, lyrics, bass (1), banjo (9), autoharp (10, 12)
- Brett Sparks – vocals, guitars, composition, recording, pedal steel guitar (1), saw (3)
- Darrell Sparks – drums (1, 5), banjo (8), violin (10)
- Jimmy Pontzer – drums (2, 8)
- Dave Gutierrez – mandolin (5), pedal steel guitar (11)
- David McChesney – trumpet (5)
- Greg Hansen – dobro (8)
- Tony Watkins – bowed bass (10)
- Roger Seibel – mastering
