= Invisible Hands (EP) =

1997 EP by the Handsome Family

EP by the Handsome Family
- Released: 1997
- Label: Scout Releases

The Handsome Family chronology
Milk and Scissors (1996)	Invisible Hands (1997)	Through the Trees (1998)

Invisible Hands is an EP by the Handsome Family. It was released 1997 as a limited Germany only, vinyl only release by Scout Releases. Only 1000 copies were pressed. The release contains an A4 lyrics sheet which states that "The House Carpenter" is a traditional, arranged by Brett Sparks. However "The House Carpenter" didn't make the record.

== Track listing ==
All music, Brett Sparks; all lyrics, Rennie Sparks, except "Barbara Allen" (traditional, arranged by Brett Sparks)

Side A

1. "Tin Foil"
  - from previous album Milk and Scissors
2. "Grandmother Waits For You"
  - early version of the track, a new version was recorded for In the Air
3. "Bury Me Here"
  - early version of the track, a new version was recorded for Through the Trees

Side B

1. "Birds You Cannot See"
  - early version of the track, a new version was recorded for Twilight
2. "Barbara Allen"
  - this track is exclusive to Invisible Hands and wasn't released again
3. "Cathedrals"
  - early version of the track, a new version was recorded for Through the Trees

== See also ==
- The Handsome Family
