= Honey Moon (The Handsome Family album) =

2009 album by the Handsome Family

Studio album by the Handsome Family
- Released: 2009
- Length: 48:11
- Label: Carrot Top / Loose Music

The Handsome Family chronology
Last Days Of Wonder (2006)	Honey Moon (2009)	Scattered (2010)

Professional ratings
Aggregate scores
Source	Rating
Metacritic	75/100
Review scores
Source	Rating
AllMusic	4/5 stars
The A.V. Club	(B+)
Pitchfork Media	7.2/10

Honey Moon is the eighth studio album by the Handsome Family. It was released 2009 by Carrot Top Records (North America) / Loose Music (Europe).

== Reception ==
The album was well received by critics: according to Metacritic, the album has received an average review score of 75/100, based on 12 reviews, indicating "generally favorable reviews".

== Track listing ==
1. "Linger, Let Me Linger" – 3:34
2. "Little Sparrows" – 3:08
3. "My Friend" – 4:56
4. "When You Whispered" – 3:11
5. "The Loneliness of Magnets" – 3:43
6. "June Bugs" – 3:38
7. "A Thousand Diamond Rings" – 3:40
8. "Love Is Like" – 3:21
9. "The Petrified Forest" – 4:11
10. "Wild Wood" - 3:10
11. "Darling, My Darling" - 3:39
12. "The Winding Corn Maze" - 4:35
13. "The Red Leaf Forest" - 3:25
  - Bonus track included on the digital version of the album sold through iTunes

== Personnel ==
- Rennie Sparks - artwork; lyrics; vocals on "Wild Woods", "The Winding Corn Maze", "Little Sparrows", "The Petrified Forest" and "When You Whispered"
- Brett Sparks - music; all instruments except as follows
- Stephen Dorocke - lap steel on "Linger, Let Me Linger" and "Love Is Like"; guitar on "The Loneliness Of Magnets", "A Thousand Diamond Rings", "Wild Wood")
- Dave Gutierrez - classical guitar ("The Winding Corn Maze"), pedal steel ("Little Sparrows"), dobro ("When You Whispered")
- Jason Toth - drums
- Sheila Sachs - Layout assistance
- Mark Owen - photography
