= Last Days of Wonder =

2006 album by the Handsome Family

Studio album by the Handsome Family
- Released: 2006
- Length: 43:23
- Label: Carrot Top / Loose Music

The Handsome Family chronology
Singing Bones (2003)	Last Days of Wonder (2006)	Honey Moon (2009)

Professional ratings
Aggregate scores
Source	Rating
Metacritic	80/100
Review scores
Source	Rating
The A.V. Club	A−
Pitchfork Media	6.7/10
Robert Christgau	A−
Encyclopedia of Popular Music	3/4 stars

Last Days of Wonder is the seventh studio album by the Handsome Family. It was released 2006 by Carrot Top Records (North America) / Loose Music (Europe). The title is a reference to Puritan scientist and witch-hunter Cotton Mather's 1693 book Wonders of the Invisible World, which lyricist Rennie Sparks found intriguing because of what she called its "madness brimming under the surface of things."

== Reception ==
The album was well received by critics: according to Metacritic, the album has received an average review score of 80/100, based on 17 reviews, indicating "generally favorable reviews". Critic Robert Christgau wrote, "At her best—which must not come easy, or they'd release more and more consistent albums—Rennie Sparks is a great American realist." The A.V. Club's Christopher Bahn said that "the Sparks don't seem particularly interested in experimenting with new musical styles, but that isn't a weakness so much as an unswerving fix on what they do better than anyone else."

== Track listing ==
1. "Your Great Journey" – 3:13
2. "Tesla's Hotel Room" – 3:56
3. "These Golden Jewels" – 3:32
4. "After We Shot The Grizzly" – 3:33
5. "Flapping Your Broken Wings" – 3:45
6. "Beautiful William" – 4:22
7. "All The Time In Airports" – 3:43
8. "White Lights" – 3:36
9. "Bowling Alley Bar" – 2:52
10. "Hunter Green" - 4:29
11. "Our Blue Sky" - 2:59
12. "Somewhere Else To Be" - 3:23

== Personnel ==
The Handsome Family

- Rennie Sparks - lyrics; artwork; some autoharp, banjo, ukulele, vocals
- Brett Sparks - music; all instruments except as follows

with:

- David Coulter - saw on "These Golden Jewels"
- Stephen Dorocke - pedal steel on "Your Great Journey" and "Somewhere Else to Be"
- David Gutierrez - jazz guitar on "After We Shot the Grizzly"
- Eric Johnson - banjo on "After We Shot the Grizzly"
- Darrel Sparks - harmony vocals on "All The Time in Airports", "Our Blue Sky" and "Your Great Journey"
- Mark Weaver - trombone on "Tesla's Hotel Room"
- Amanda Kooser - 12-string guitar on "Our Blue Sky"

Technical

- Mastered by Roger Seibel/SAE - mastering
- Johanna Nelson - back cover photo (https://www.flickr.com/photos/girlfromauntie).
- Sheila Sachs - layout assistance
