= Unseen (The Handsome Family album) =

2016 album by the Handsome Family

Studio album by the Handsome Family
- Released: September 16, 2016
- Genre: Gothic folk; country
- Length: 42:06
- Label: Milk & Scissors Music, Loose Music

The Handsome Family chronology
Wilderness (2013)	Unseen (2016)	Hollow (2023)

Professional ratings
Aggregate scores
Source	Rating
Metacritic	81/100
Review scores
Source	Rating
AllMusic	3.5/5 stars
Blurt	4/5 stars
Folk Radio UK	(positive)
The Independent	4/5 stars
The Line of Best Fit	6.5/10
Magnet	95/100
Mojo	4/5 stars
PopMatters	7/10
Robert Christgau	3/4 stars

Unseen is the tenth studio album by the Handsome Family. It was released in September 2016 by the band's own label Milk & Scissors Music, and Loose Music in Europe.

In a departure from recent prior albums, the main duo of Brett and Rennie Sparks were joined by three guest musicians: David Gutierrez (mandolin and dobro), Alex McMahon (guitar, baritone guitar, pedal steel), and Jason Toth (drums).

== Reception ==
The album was well received by critics: according to Metacritic, the album has received an average review score of 81/100, based on 9 reviews, "indicating universal acclaim". Justin Cober-Lake of PopMatters wrote that "Unseen continues the duo's gothic folk and country aesthetic", and noted that the recent high-profile success of the Handsome Family song "Far From Any Road", which was used as the theme song to the TV series True Detective, had not seemed to change the band's approach: "they still sing from the margins, crafting alluring characters and sounds. ... With all its soft unquiet, Unseen stands with the most captivating of the pair's previous work." Joe Goggins of The Line of Best Fit felt that the album did not take enough risks, stating that "it's on the cuts where there's signs of progression that Unseen excels, not least because the duo pull them off with real nuance every time."

== Track listing ==
All tracks are written by The Handsome Family.

Unseen track listing
No.	Title	Length
1.	"Gold"	4:00
2.	"The Silver Light"	3:51
3.	"Back in My Day"	3:30
4.	"Tiny Tina"	4:10
5.	"Underneath the Falls"	4:13
6.	"The Sea Rose"	3:41
7.	"The Red Door"	5:14
8.	"Gentleman"	3:48
9.	"King of Dust"	5:06
10.	"Green Willow Valley"	4:33
