= Celebration, Florida (album) =

Studio album by The Felice Brothers
- Released: May 10, 2011
- Studio: Old Beacon High School, Beacon, New York
- Label: Fat Possum, Loose

The Felice Brothers chronology
Mix Tape (2010)	Celebration, Florida (2011)	God Bless You, Amigo (2012)

Celebration, Florida, by The Felice Brothers, was released on May 10, 2011. The single "Ponzi", released on March 29, 2011, shows a departure from the group's past roots-rock albums with a new electro, dancehall sound.

== Reception ==
Professional ratings
Aggregate scores
Source	Rating
Metacritic	77/100
Review scores
Source	Rating
AllMusic	4/5 stars
The A.V. Club	B+
Drowned in Sound	6/10
Filter	76%
The Guardian	4/5 stars
Pitchfork	5.7/10
PopMatters	7/10 stars

Celebration, Florida received positive reviews from critics. On Metacritic, the album holds a score of 77 out of 100 based on 14 reviews, indicating "generally favorable reviews".

== Track listing ==
1. "Fire at the Pageant" – 3:33
2. "Container Ship" – 4:16
3. "Honda Civic" – 3:27
4. "Oliver Stone" – 5:59
5. "Ponzi" – 5:19
6. "Back in the Dancehalls" – 3:34
7. "Dallas" – 4:01
8. "Cus's Catskill Gym" – 3:53
9. "Refrain" – 3:16
10. "Best I Ever Had" – 4:00
11. "River Jordan" – 6:30
