= Scout Releases =

German record label

Scout Releases were an indie-label from Aachen, Germany, active in the mid-1990s.

== Notable bands ==
- The Fall – The Legendary Chaos Tape
- Sally Timms – To the Land of Milk and Honey, It Says Here
- Ashtray Boy – The Honeymoon Suite
- The Handsome Family – Odessa, Milk and Scissors, Invisible Hands
- The Mekons and Kathy Acker – Pussy, King of the Pirates
- Jonboy Langford and the Pine Valley Cosmonauts – Misery Loves Company
- Delta Of Venus – Neutral A
- Dave-id Busaras – Smegma 'Structions Don't Rhyme
- Big Red Kite – Short Stories
