= Down in the Valley (album) =

1999 compilation album by the Handsome Family

Down In The Valley

Compilation album by the Handsome Family
- Released: 1999
- Length: 47:52
- Label: Independent

The Handsome Family chronology
Through the Trees (1998)	Down In The Valley (1999)	In the Air (2000)

Professional ratings
Review scores
Source	Rating
Encyclopedia of Popular Music	4/4 stars
Tom Hull – on the Web	A−

Down in the Valley is an Ireland-only compilation of songs by the Handsome Family. It was released 1999 by Independent Records. The subtitle of the compilation runs: "A treasury of their most willowy and haunted songs." The compilation contains tracks from Odessa (1994) (tracks 10 & 13), Milk and Scissors (1996) (tracks 1, 3, 5, 7, 9, 14), and Through the Trees (1998) (tracks 2, 4, 6, 11, 12).

== Track listing ==
1. "Tin Foil" – 2:41
2. "My Sister's Tiny Hands" – 3:28
3. "Lake Geneva" – 3:14
4. "Weightless Again" – 3:39
5. "#1 Country Song" – 3:37
6. "The Giant Of Illinois" – 3:06
7. "Drunk By Noon" – 2:51
8. "Don't be Scared" – 2:50 (a different version appears on In the Air)
9. "The House Carpenter" – 3:38
10. "Arlene" - 3:39
11. "The Woman Downstairs" - 4:47
12. "Cathedrals" - 3:23
13. "Moving Furniture" - 3:06
14. "The Dutch Boy" - 3:53
