= Tonight at the Arizona =

Tonight At The Arizona

Studio album by The Felice Brothers
- Released: June 25, 2007
- Genres: Americana, Folk rock
- Label: Loose

The Felice Brothers chronology
Through These Reins and Gone (2006)	Tonight At The Arizona (2007)	Adventures of The Felice Brothers Vol. 1 (2008)

Re-release Cover
- Album cover for re-release in 2008

Tonight At The Arizona was released in 2007 by The Felice Brothers on English Label Loose. The influence of Bob Dylan and The Band is evident in many of their songs, such as "The Ballad of Lou the Welterweight", a roots revivalist folk ballad "...based on a story my grandpa used to tell us about" as James Felice put it. The imperfections in the recording of "Hey Hey Revolver" are supposedly from a lightning strike during the recording of the song. In 2008, the album was re-issued with three additional tracks: "Nowhere New York", "The Country Is Gone," and "Got What I Need" from their previous album, Through These Reins and Gone.

Professional ratings
Review scores
Source	Rating
AllMusic	4/5 stars

== Track listing ==
1. "Roll On Arte"
2. "Ballad Of Lou The Welterweight"
3. "Hey Hey Revolver"
4. "Your Belly In My Arms"
5. "Lady Day"
6. "T For Texas"
7. "Rockefeller Druglaw Blues"
8. "Mercy"
9. "Christmas Song"
10. "Going Going Gone"
11. "Take This Hammer" (Live)
