= Wonders of the Invisible World =

1693 book written by Cotton Mather

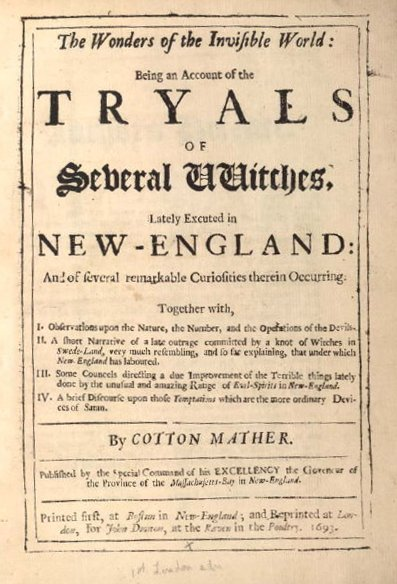
Wonders of the Invisible World (1693)

The Wonders of the Invisible World was a book written by Cotton Mather and published in 1693. It was subtitled, Observations As well Historical as Theological, upon the Nature, the Number, and the Operations of the Devils. The book defended Mather's role in the witchhunt conducted in Salem, Massachusetts. It espoused the belief that witchcraft was an evil magical power. Mather saw witches as tools of the devil in Satan's battle to "overturn this poor plantation, the Puritan colony", and prosecution of witches as a way to secure God's blessings for the colony.

Its arguments are largely derivative of Saducismus Triumphatus by Joseph Glanvill. A copy of Glanvill's book was in Mather's library when he died.

Robert Calef published a refutation of Mather's book in 1700.

== Summary ==
Cotton Mather was born in 1663. After graduating from Harvard College, he followed in his father's footsteps, becoming pastor of the Second Church of Boston. He continued in this role from 1685 until his death in 1728.

Mather began with an explanation of how the people of God were living in the devil's territories. He discussed the devil's plan to overturn the plantation and churches with the help of witches.

"...An army of devils is horribly broke in upon the place which is the center, and after a sort, the first-born of our English settlements...

Mather prefaced the trials by saying he would recount them as a historian. One of the trials included was Martha Carrier's, who was "[t]he person of whom the confessions of the witches, and of her own children among the rest, agreed that the devil had promised her she should be Queen of Hell." Mather presented testimonies against Martha Carrier, all of which presumed her to be guilty.

== Analysis ==
=== Point of view ===
Mather presented himself as an unbiased informer to the reader. He received his information from court records. He did not present defenses against the testimonies given.

=== Language ===
Mather’s background as a minister showed in his references to religion. Mather went into details on the traditional religious view of the Devil and witchcraft.

Puritan colonists feared the perceived witches among themselves, "and the houses of the good people are filled with the doleful shrieks of their children and servants, tormented by invisible hands.".

== Legacy ==
Mather's book inspired the title of the 2006 album Last Days of Wonder by Chicago band The Handsome Family; lyricist Rennie Sparks has stated she was intrigued by what she called its "madness brimming under the surface of things."

== See also ==
- Salem Witch Trials
- Puritanism
