= Ian Felice =

American musician and painter

- Born: Ian Felice; January 18, 1982 (age 44)
- Origin: Palenville, NY, U.S.
- Occupations: Painter; songwriter; poet
- Years active: 2005-present
- Website: ianfelice.com

Ian Felice (born January 18, 1982) is an American musician, painter and poet born and raised in the Catskill Mountains of New York. He is the lead guitarist, singer and songwriter for The Felice Brothers and holds a B.F.A. in painting from the Pratt Institute.

== Early life ==
Felice was raised in the hamlet of Palenville, New York. His parents split up when he was a newborn and his mother raised him and his two siblings as a single mother. His mother remarried; however, his stepfather battled drug addiction and died of an overdose when Felice was 8 years old. This experience influenced Felice's song "In Memoriam" on his solo record, In the Kingdom of Dreams. While naming William Blake as his biggest artistic influence, Felice has said that his mother is his strongest influence as a person. When Felice was 18, he moved to New York to study art and soon after began writing songs and performing with his brothers Simone and James. The Felice Brothers was conceived in 2006 after the recording of Iantown, a 10-song album of Felice's first songs recorded in one night in January 2006.

== In the Kingdom of Dreams ==
In the Kingdom of Dreams is Felice's first solo record. The LP was released via Loose on August 25, 2017 and was recorded at Sugar Mountain Studios in Palenville over four days in February 2017. It was produced by Simone Felice and features appearances by his brother James Felice on keyboards and Josh Rawson on bass.

The cover art is the painting Death on a Pale Horse by 19th-century painter Albert Pinkham Ryder.

Most of the songs were written in 2016, when Felice learned he would be a first-time father.

== Painting ==
Felice's background as a visual artist has informed his music and, by extension, his literary productions. He painted the covers for some of The Felice Brothers' albums, including their Christmas album on vinyl, Country Ham and Murder by Mistletoe (2016), Favorite Waitress (2014), and Undress (2019).

Additionally, Conor Oberst used Felice's painting, The Creation of the Bulls, as the cover art for his solo album Upside Down Mountain.

His painting, Invitation to Summer, served as the cover for The Poetry Review - Spring 2022 Edition.

Felice's work was featured in Solid Gold at Half Gallery in Los Angeles in 2023 and in 2024, he made his debut in New York City at the Half Gallery Annex with the show If the Hoarfrost Could Speak.

== Poetry ==
- Hotel Swampland (self-published, 2017), a companion book of poems written at the same time as his solo record, In the Kingdom of Dreams
- The Moon Over Edgar (Sibling Rivalry Press, 2022)
