= Hollow (album) =

Studio album by the Handsome Family
- Released: September 8, 2023
- Length: 40:43
- Label: Milk & Scissors
- Producer: Brett Sparks

The Handsome Family chronology
Unseen (2016)	Hollow (2023)

Hollow is the eleventh studio album by American duo the Handsome Family, released on September 8, 2023, through Milk & Scissors Music. It is their first studio album in seven years, following Unseen (2016), and received acclaim from critics.

== Critical reception ==
Professional ratings
Aggregate scores
Source	Rating
Metacritic	83/100
Review scores
Source	Rating
AllMusic	4/5 stars
Mojo	4/5 stars
Paste	7.9/10
Uncut	8/10
Under the Radar	7.5/10 stars

Hollow received a score of 83 out of 100 on review aggregator Metacritic, based on five critics' reviews, indicating "universal acclaim". Mojo commented, "accompanied by electronic and acoustic instruments, Brett's baritone sounds less sombre on this album, more rich, relaxed, even crooning on Strawberry Moon – a perfect foil for Rennie's vision of a world full of blood and ghosts". Uncut felt that "a surreal sense of the macabre in everyday life remains their MO, from 'Skunks'' shuffling crawl space inhabitants to the winged appetites of the softly intoned 'Mothballs'".

AllMusic's Mark Deming called it "one of their most musically satisfying albums in decades", remarking that Brett and Rennie Sparks have "managed to keep this material sounding spare and intimate while adding extra layers of musical detail that strengthen the arrangements". Writing for Paste, Eric R. Danton felt that the album "strikes a balance between foreboding quiet numbers and deceptively airy tracks that belie the fatalistic lyrical content". Marc Abbott of Under the Radar concluded, "that these 11 songs evoke such solid mental images of their lyrical content is testament to the power of the Sparks' songwriting capabilities, and the duo's lasting aptitude for storytelling. And the timely, primal paean to Mother Earth weaving its wonderful way through Hollow is enough to send you off to the woods with no intention of returning".

== Track listing ==
Hollow track listing
No.	Title	Length
1.	"Joseph"	4:14
2.	"Two Black Shoes"	3:58
3.	"The King of Everything"	3:43
4.	"Skunks"	3:27
5.	"The Oldest Water"	3:09
6.	"Mothballs"	2:44
7.	"Shady Lake"	3:19
8.	"To the Oaks"	3:54
9.	"Strawberry Moon"	4:23
10.	"Invisible Man"	3:51
11.	"Good Night"	4:01
Total length:		40:43

== Charts ==
Chart performance for Hollow
Chart (2023)	Peak position
Scottish Albums (OCC)	79
UK Country Albums (OCC)	5
UK Independent Albums (OCC)	30
