= Through These Reins and Gone =

Studio album by The Felice Brothers
- Released: November 17, 2006
- Genre: Americana, Folk rock
- Producer: Jeremy Backofen the Searcher

The Felice Brothers chronology
Iantown (2005)	Through These Reins and Gone (2006)	Tonight At The Arizona (2007)

Through These Reins and Gone is the 2006 debut release from The Felice Brothers.

== Track listing ==
1. "Trailer Song" (sung by Simone Felice)
2. "Ballad of Lou the Welterweight"
3. "Hey Hey Revolver"
4. "Your Belly in My Arms"
5. "Got What I Need"
6. "Soldiers Song"
7. "Valentines Song"
8. "Roll On Arte"
9. "Christmas Song"
10. "Mercy"
11. "Song to Die To"
12. "Going Going Gone"
