= Favorite Waitress =

Studio album by the Felice Brothers
- Released: June 9, 2014
- Studio: Arc, Omaha, Nebraska
- Genre: Rock, roots rock
- Label: Dualtone
- Producer: Jeremy Backofen

The Felice Brothers chronology
God Bless You, Amigo (2012)	Favorite Waitress (2014)	Felice Navidad (2015)

Favorite Waitress is an album by the American band the Felice Brothers, first released on June 9, 2014, in the United Kingdom. They supported it with UK and North American tours. The first single was "Cherry Licorice".

== Production ==
The Felice Brothers spent a year working on the songs for Favorite Waitress. Produced by Jeremy Backofen, it was recorded in a week at Arc Studios, in Omaha, Nebraska. The band wanted a more minimalist sound and tried to use only instruments that they played on a regular basis. They used a string section on "Lion". "Bird on Broken Wing" is dedicated to Pete Seeger.

== Critical reception ==
Professional ratings
Review scores
Source	Rating
AllMusic	3.5/5 stars
Exclaim!	7/10
Ox-Fanzine	7/10
Pitchfork	5.6/10
The Press	2/5 stars
Rolling Stone	3/5 stars
Uncut	3.5/5 stars

The Liverpool Echo said that the album "lurches with a loose, devil-may-care energy that can obscure and highlight the beauty of the songs within." Rolling Stone opined that "the lively romp 'Lion' ... proves that the Felices translate best on record when they're being their boisterous, rootsy selves." The Philadelphia Inquirer noted the "darker, more expressionistic turn".

The New York Times stated that "the songs lurch, sway, plunk and rock out; they turn cryptic or offer direct comfort, focusing the album's many allusions to economic inequality". The Bristol Post called the music "a country bar room slur mixed with a vaudevillian honky tonk stagger through the weird, the broken and the wonderful". The Press dismissed the album as "too calculated, too mechanical".

== Track listing ==
No.	Title	Length
1.	"Bird on Broken Wing"
2.	"Cherry Licorice"
3.	"Meadow of a Dream"
4.	"Lion"
5.	"Saturday Night"
6.	"Constituents"
7.	"Hawthorne"
8.	"Katie Cruel"
9.	"No Trouble"
10.	"Alien"
11.	"Chinatown"
12.	"Woman Next Door"
13.	"Silver in the Shadow"
