= Valley of Abandoned Songs =

Studio album by The Felice Brothers
- Released: June 28, 2024
- Length: 47:56
- Label: Million Stars

The Felice Brothers chronology
Asylum on the Hill (2023)	Valley of Abandoned Songs (2024)

Valley of Abandoned Songs is a studio album by American folk rock band The Felice Brothers. It was released on June 28, 2024, by Million Stars Records.

== Background ==
Valley of Abandoned Songs is composed of multiple tracks written for the band's previous albums, Undress (2019) and Asylum on the Hill (2023), but which did not harmonize with them and were therefore 'abandoned'. The album centers on the themes of death, regret, fear, devotion, and disillusionment.

== Reception ==
Professional ratings
Review scores
Source	Rating
AllMusic	4/5 stars
PopMatters	7/10 stars
The AU Review	4.5/5 stars

AllMusic wrote in its review about the album, "Passing through the Valley of Abandoned Songs, it seems, is a little like visiting the Lost & Found, and there's definite value in these reclaimed works of art." PopMatters gave the album seven stars and stated "Valley of Abandoned Songs offers a whistling-through-the-graveyard approach to contemporary life." Glide Magazine wrote "No wonder this eccentric ensemble continues to make albums like Valley of Abandoned Songs that reaffirm the notion great music is timeless," and The AU Review praised it as "a clean and concise collection of songs that were never intended to fit as a collection but ultimately blend seamlessly into one another." No Depression remarked "Valley of Abandoned Songs toes the realm between the fantastical and the physical, always bringing a world-weary grounding to The Felice Brothers' lovingly crafted worlds where nothing is ever as it seems."

== Track listing ==
No.	Title	Length
1.	"Crime Scene Queen"	3:50
2.	"Flowers by the Roadside"	3:47
3.	"New York by Moonlight"	3:09
4.	"Younger as the Days Go By"	3:20
5.	"So Long John"	4:03
6.	"Black Is My True Love's Hair"	3:07
7.	"Raccoon, Rooster and Crow"	3:21
8.	"Stranger's Arms"	4:32
9.	"Birdies"	3:59
10.	"Tomorrow Is Just a Dream Away"	3:40
11.	"Let Me Ride Away With the Horsemen"	4:24
12.	"It's Midnight and the Doves Are in Tears"	3:22
13.	"To Be a Papa"	3:22
Total length:		47:56
