= Frankie Lee (Americana musician) =

American singer-songwriter

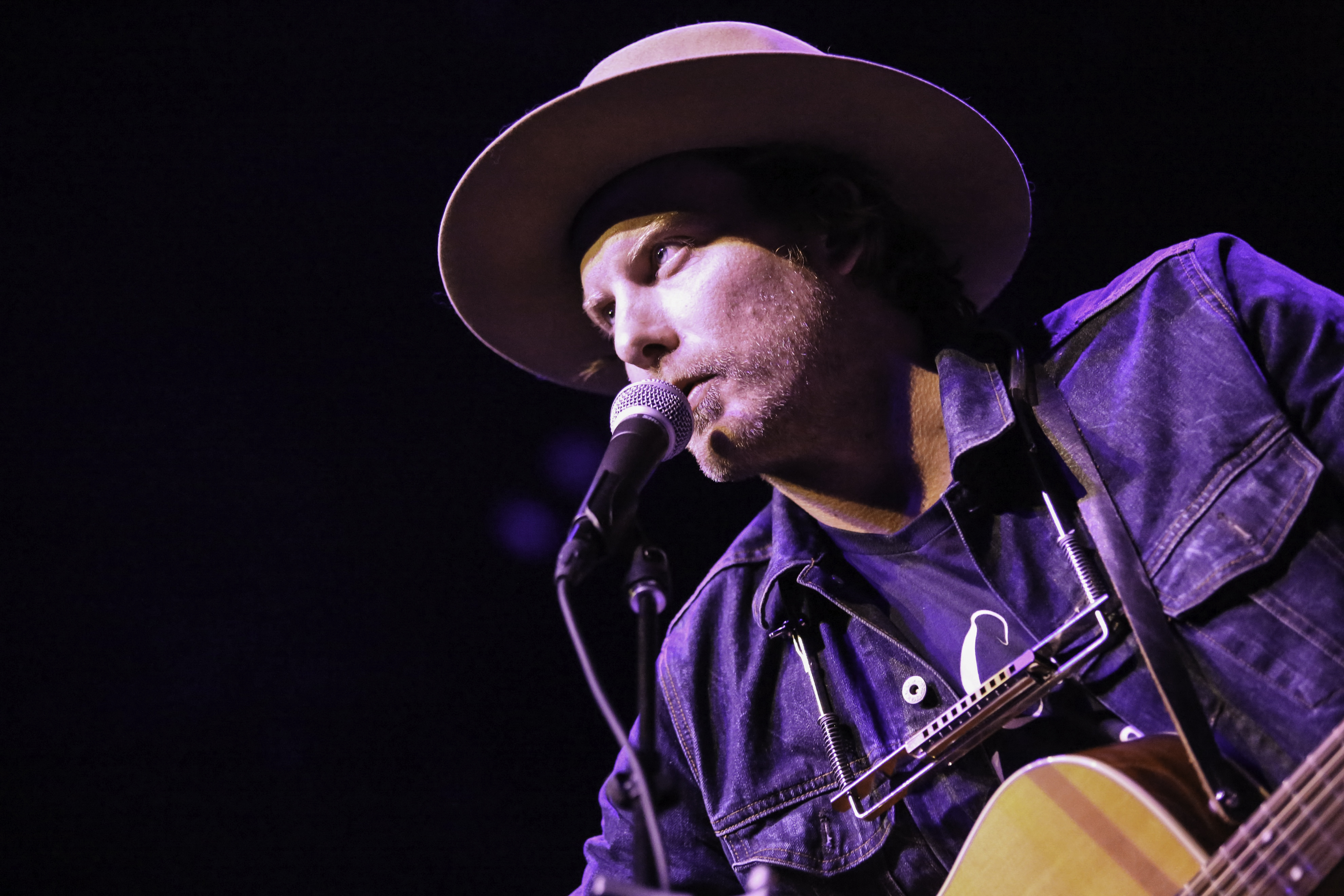

Background information
- Birth name: Frankie Lee Peterson
- Born: June 28, 1982 (age 43)
- Genres: Folk; Acoustic; Folk rock Americana
- Occupation: Singer-songwriter
- Instrument(s): Vocals, guitar, bass guitar, piano, harmonica
- Years active: 2003–present
- Labels: Loose
- Website: Frankie Lee Official Website

Frankie Lee (born Frankie Lee Peterson, June 28, 1982) is an American singer-songwriter, multi-instrumentalist and record producer, originally from Stillwater, Minnesota.

In early 2013 he released an EP, Middle West. Having been voted the Best Songwriter by City Pages in 2014, Lee received radio play by KCMP. In the spring of 2015, Lee released a four-song video EP. In the summer of 2015, Lee signed a worldwide record deal with London-based record label, Loose. On October 2, 2015, Lee's first album, American Dreamer, was released in Europe.

== Early life ==
At the age of 12, Lee inherited his father's record collection and an acoustic guitar. He spent days and nights teaching himself to play along to folk, country, and western records. Lee cites the music of Bob Dylan and Hank Williams as motivators to start writing his own material.

Raised in bars by his father's friends and uncle (Johnny Vincent), Lee started performing on stage in his early teens. Slim Dunlap and Curtiss A were mentors and would take the time to show him songs and invite him on stage to play and sing with their bands. Influenced by Nirvana, The Dead Milkmen, Tom Petty and Lucinda Williams. Lee began his own musical career in local bars, playing four-hour cover sets under the name Clyde. The band was composed of high school friends Brendan Kane and Sam Rockwell. Lee graduated high school in 2000 and left for college in Wisconsin on a full soccer scholarship. Lee talked his coach into letting him take out his scholarship money to "go west".

Lee lived in Austin, Texas, Los Angeles, Tulsa, Nashville, Milwaukee, Montana and Minneapolis.

== Career ==
In early 2001, Lee moved to Austin to study the craft of his favorite writers and storytellers at the time. Eventually he settled into east Austin working for Townes Van Zandt's son (JT) while recording his first demos on Joe Ely's four track recorder. He passed around tapes to what would land him local bookings and a following of like minded musicians in the up-and-coming folk/americana scene.

After returning home in late 2010, Lee started recording songs for what would become his Middle West EP. The EP sold out all of its copies at the Minneapolis record store Electric Fetus.

In early 2015, Lee signed a record deal with London-based label, Loose, and released his first full-length record, American Dreamer. The album was released in the United States in the summer of 2016 through Loose and distributed by Thirty Tigers.

Lee's second album, Stillwater, was recorded at a makeshift studio in Stillwater, Minnesota and released in June 2019. Lee's song "Speakeasy" was featured in the third episode of the NBC series This Is Us on October 8, 2019.

== Discography ==
=== Studio albums ===
- Stillwater ( Loose / River Valley Music)
- American Dreamer ( Loose Europe-2015; Loose/Thirty Tigers)

=== Studio EPs ===
- Middle West (2013)

=== Singles ===
- "Where Do We Belong" / "Buffalo" 7"
