= Yonder Is the Clock =

Yonder Is The Clock

Studio album by The Felice Brothers
- Released: April 7, 2009
- Genres: Americana, Folk rock
- Label: Team Love Records

The Felice Brothers chronology
The Felice Brothers (2008)	Yonder Is The Clock (2009)	Mix Tape (2010)

Yonder Is The Clock is The Felice Brothers' sixth album and their second major release. It was released on April 7, 2009.

== Reception ==
Professional ratings
Aggregate scores
Source	Rating
Metacritic	84/100
Review scores
Source	Rating
AllMusic	4/5 stars
The Austin Chronicle	3.5/5 stars
The A.V. Club	A
Entertainment Weekly	A−
Drowned in Sound	8/10
Mojo	4/5 stars
Paste	7.9/10
Spin	3.5/5 stars
Uncut	5/5 stars
Under the Radar	7/10

Yonder Is the Clock received positive reviews from critics. On Metacritic, the album holds a score of 84 out of 100 based on 14 reviews, indicating "universal acclaim".

== Track listing ==
1. "The Big Surprise" - 4:24
2. "Penn Station" - 4:00
3. "Buried In Ice" - 3:13
4. "Chicken Wire" - 2:45
5. "Ambulance Man" - 5:29
6. "Sailor Song" - 3:32
7. "Katie Dear" - 4:01
8. "Run Chicken Run" - 5:02
9. "All When We Were Young" - 3:27
10. "Boy From Lawrence County" - 5:23
11. "Memphis Flu" - 3:04
12. "Cooperstown" - 6:16
13. "Rise and Shine" - 4:25
