= Wilderness (The Handsome Family album) =

2013 album by the Handsome Family

Studio album by the Handsome Family
- Released: May 14, 2013
- Length: 52:41
- Label: Carrot Top, Loose Music

The Handsome Family chronology
Scattered (2010)	Wilderness (2013)	Unseen (2016)

Professional ratings
Aggregate scores
Source	Rating
Metacritic	76/100
Review scores
Source	Rating
Allmusic	3.5/5 stars
The A.V. Club	B+
PopMatters	7/10 stars
Robert Christgau	A−

Wilderness is the ninth studio album by the Handsome Family. It was released in May 2013 by Carrot Top Records. Wilderness is an often surreal concept album about nature, with each song named after an animal.

The album was released both as a single album and a box-set version that included a companion book of essays and art by Rennie Sparks.

== Reception ==
The album was well received by critics: according to Metacritic, the album has received an average review score of 76/100, based on 9 reviews, indicating "generally favorable reviews". James Monger of AllMusic noted the album's Kafkaesque, dreamlike quality, praising the "remarkably affecting" song "Wildebeest", about the death of 19th-century songwriter Stephen Foster. A.V. Club reviewer Christopher Bahn described Wilderness as "one of the strongest, most cohesive albums of their career", calling it "rootsy, literary country-rock that's a little like a collaboration between Hank Williams and Edgar Allan Poe." He particularly praised Rennie Sparks' lyrics, which he called "less traditional verse-chorus-verse than short stories in song form, musing on the beauty and brutality of nature, the murky depths of the human heart, and forgotten tidbits of American history and myth." Critic Robert Christgau called the music "uningratiating" but praised its subtlety and deftness, saying that "the tales themselves are why you first listen. But these are so fine you don't mind listening again."

== Track list ==
All tracks are written by The Handsome Family.

No.	Title	Length
1.	"Flies"	3:41
2.	"Frogs"	4:41
3.	"Eels"	4:25
4.	"Octopus"	3:33
5.	"Owls"	3:59
6.	"Caterpillars"	4:41
7.	"Glow Worm"	5:33
8.	"Lizard"	5:12
9.	"Woodpecker"	4:22
10.	"Gulls"	4:20
11.	"Spider"	3:54
12.	"Wildebeest"	4:20
