= Mix Tape (The Felice Brothers album) =

Studio album by The Felice Brothers
- Released: March 30, 2010
- Genres: Americana, Folk rock
- Label: New York Pro

The Felice Brothers chronology
Yonder Is The Clock (2009)	Mix Tape (2010)	Celebration, Florida (2011)

Mix Tape is The Felice Brothers' seventh album. It is a limited release on the New York Pro label. It was released on March 30, 2010.

== Track listing ==
1. "Forever Green" - 3:01
2. "Ahab" - 4:03
3. "White Limo" - 2:46
4. "Let Me Come Home" - 3:56
5. "The Captain's Wife" - 3:18
6. "Indian Massacre" - 4:18
7. "Old Song" - 2:49
8. "Marie" - 2:56
9. "Marlboro Man" - 5:44
