= Live at Schuba's Tavern =

2002 live album by the Handsome Family

Live At Schuba's Tavern

Live album by the Handsome Family
- Released: 2002
- Recorded: December 8, 2000
- Length: 65:20
- Label: Digital Club Network

The Handsome Family chronology
| Twilight (2001) | Live At Schuba's Tavern (2002) | Smothered and Covered (2003) |

Live at Schuba's [sic] Tavern is a live album by the Handsome Family recorded at Schubas Tavern in Chicago, Illinois. It was released 2002 by Digital Club Network. It contains songs as well as short jokes or stories told by the band.

Professional ratings
Review scores
| Source | Rating |
|---|---|
| AllMusic | 3/5 stars |
| The Encyclopedia of Popular Music | 3/5 stars |
| Pitchfork | 6.5/10 |
| The Village Voice | A– |

== Track listing ==
1. "Amelia Earhart Vs. The Dancing Bear" - 3:21
2. "The Good Toothpicks" - 0:18
3. "So Much Wine" - 3:57
4. "The Czar Bar" - 1:02
5. "Tinfoil" - 2:41
6. "A Beautiful Thing" - 3:45
7. "Vienna Sausage Hotline" - 0:53
8. "The Giant of Illinois" - 3:12
9. "My Sister's Tiny Hands" - 3:18
10. "Names For All His Shirts" - 0:36
11. "Cathedrals" - 3:51
12. "Weightless Again" - 3:44
13. "Bony Bread" - 0:24
14. "Winnebago Skeletons" - 3:45
15. "Drunk by Noon" - 2:49
16. "Magic Balls, Introduction" - 0:58
17. "The Sad Milkman" - 3:18
18. "Magic Balls, Conclusion" - 2:07
19. "I Know You Are There" - 3:21
20. "Down in the Ground" - 3:10
21. "Arlene" - 3:46
22. "Moving Furniture Around" - 3:50
23. "Freebird" - 0:16
24. "My Ghost" - 2:44
25. "The Woman Downstairs" - 4:25

Tracks 2, 4, 7, 10, 13, 16, 18 and 23 are conversations on stage or with the audience.
