= Iantown =

Studio album by The Felice Brothers
- Released: 2006
- Recorded: January 21, 2006
- Studio: Bearsville Studios
- Genre: Americana, Folk rock
- Producer: Simin Felice, Robert Burke

The Felice Brothers chronology
Iantown (2006)	Through These Reins and Gone (2006)

Iantown was the first album to be released under the name The Felice Brothers; however, for the most part, it features only Ian Felice on acoustic guitar and harmonica.

According to the album credits the Iantown was recorded in one evening.

The album was self-released and is now out of print.

== Track listing ==
1. "You're All Around"
2. "Devil As A Child"
3. "The Long Road Ahead"
4. "In the Arms of Buffalo Bill"
5. "Her Eyes Dart 'Round"
6. "Rosie, I'm Wrong"
7. "Steal A Memory"
8. "Trouble Been Hard"
9. "Roll On Arte"
10. "In My Life"
