= The Felice Brothers =

American band

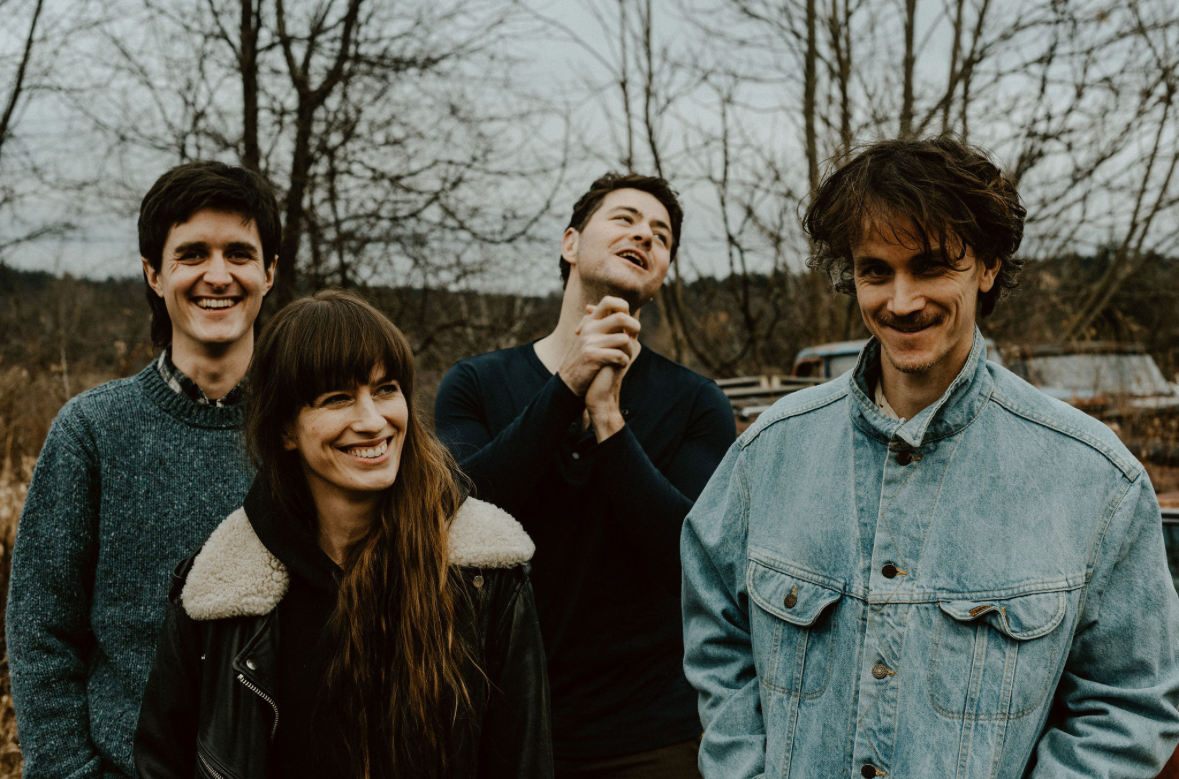
- The Felice Brothers: William Lawrence, Jesske Hume, James Felice & Ian Felice (Photo By: Lawrence Braun)

Background information
- Origin: Palenville, New York, United States
- Genres: Rock, Americana, folk rock, country rock, roots rock
- Years active: 2006–present
- Labels: Million Stars, Loose, Fat Possum, Team Love, Yep Roc
- Members: Ian Felice; James Felice; Will Lawrence; Jesske Hume
- Past members: Simone Felice; Dave Turbeville; Josh Rawson; Greg Farley; David Estabrook
- Website: thefelicebrothers.com

The Felice Brothers are an American folk rock/country rock band from New York.

== History ==
Originally from Palenville in the Catskill Mountains, the Felice Brothers started playing in the New York City's 42nd Street and Union Square subway stations while living in Brooklyn.

Their 2006 self-released debut album Through These Reins and Gone made Radio Woodstock WDST's top 25 albums of the year. They released 2007's Tonight at the Arizona on Loose then self-released Adventures of the Felice Brothers Vol. 1. James Felice said, "We put one record out on an English label [Loose], and we've released all the other stuff ourselves [on their label New York Pro]." In 2007, the Felice Brothers played at Levon Helm's Midnight Ramble in Woodstock, New York and toured with Bright Eyes.

=== 2008 ===
On January 7, it was announced that The Felice Brothers had signed a record deal with Team Love Records in the US. They toured the United States extensively during the spring (February through mid-April) to promote their new album. The Brothers played at Mountain Jam at Hunter Mountain again that year. They also played at the 2008 Clearwater Festival, Bonnaroo in Manchester, Tennessee, the Philadelphia Folk Festival in Schwenksville, Pennsylvania, All Points West Music and Arts Festival at Liberty State Park in Jersey City, and Outside lands music and arts festival in San Francisco, the later two festivals being inaugural events.

In August, the band performed at the legendary Newport Folk Festival. Due to torrential rains, high winds, and lightning storms, power was cut to the entire Newport, Rhode Island area. As the stage the band was performing on had no generators, the band played unplugged. They performed for over an hour with such songs as "Frankie's Gun!" and a sing-a-long to "This Land Is Your Land".

=== 2009 ===
The Felice Brothers joined Old Crow Medicine Show, Justin Townes Earle and the Dave Rawlings Machine for a nine-city package tour called The Big Surprise Tour, after the lead track from the Yonder Is the Clock album. Kicking off on August 4, 2009 at the Casino Ballroom in Hampton Beach, New Hampshire, the tour travelled around the eastern United States before wrapping up at the World's Fair Park in Knoxville, Tennessee, on August 14, 2009.

=== 2010 ===
The Felice Brothers opened for the Dave Matthews Band at four concerts in Canada and the US, starting at the Molson Amphitheatre in Toronto on June 1, 2010. They also appeared at the Hardly Strictly Bluegrass Festival in San Francisco on October 3. In late September and early October the band reunited for four shows with Conor Oberst. All the shows were in California. They appeared at the End of the Road Festival, Larmer Tree Gardens, Dorset, England in September.

=== 2011 ===
The Felice Brothers released the single "Ponzi" on March 29. It was the first single from their newest album "Celebration, Florida" which released on May 10 on Fat Possum (USA) and May 23 on Loose in Europe.

=== 2012 ===
The Felice Brothers released a collection of songs on July 18 entitled "God Bless You, Amigo". It is a mixture of previously unreleased original songs and covers of classic folk songs. Shortly thereafter drummer Dave Turbeville was replaced by drummer David Estabrook.

=== 2013 ===
On December 30, 2013, Dell launched their commercial called "Beginnings". It was made by Y&R, New York advertising agency, and features a cover of The Drifters' hit "This Magic Moment" performed by The Felice Brothers.

=== 2026 ===
In July of 2026, the band announced a tribute album to be released in their honor by the title "Felice County Fair: A Celebration of The Felice Brothers". The album was later released on October 16, 2026, and included covers of the band's songs by friends and fans including Bright Eyes, Deer Tick, The Lumineers, Phoebe Bridgers, Old Crow Medicine Show, and many others. In the same month, on October 14th, a film on The Felice Brothers titled "Lunatic Dreamers" directed by Tiller Russell was first screened at the Woodstock Film Festival. The film follows the band as they write and record their first album to be under a Sony label.

== Personnel ==
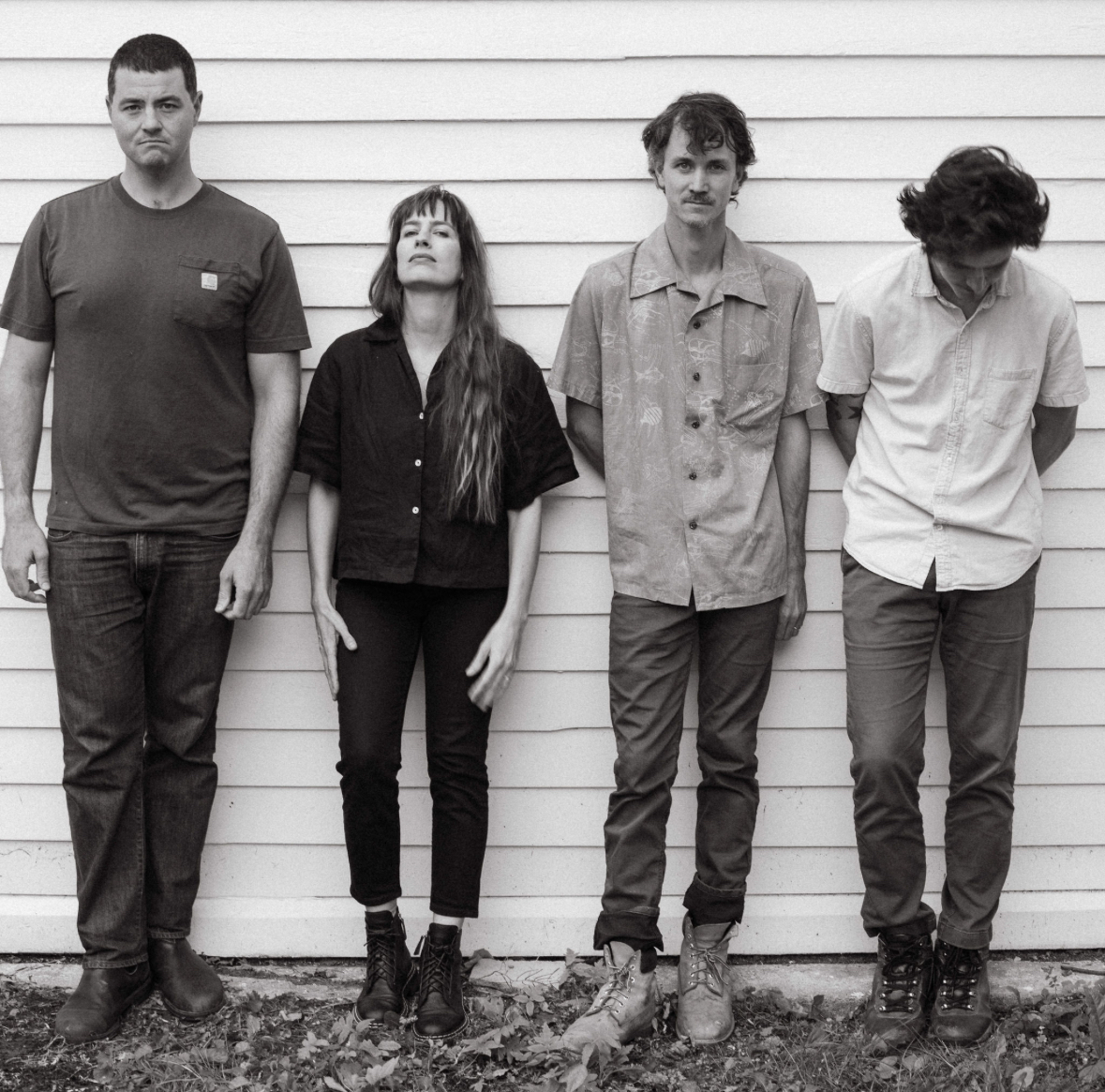

The band has two main members, Ian and James Felice. Former members include their brother Simone Felice, their friend Josh "Christmas Clapton" Rawson, frequently described as a traveling dice player, fiddle player Greg Farley, and drummer David Estabrook. At other times, they have featured a horn section in the band, composed of local Hudson Valley musicians. Ian is the main vocalist and plays the guitar and piano. James contributes vocals and plays the accordion, organ, and piano. Christmas plays the bass guitar. Dave Turbeville played the drums from 2009 to 2012, performing on Celebration, Florida, Poughkeepsie Princess, Mixtape, and God Bless You, Amigo. Simone Felice was the drummer as well as a vocalist and a guitarist. Simone is also an author, having released books entitled Goodbye Amelia, Hail Mary, Full of Holes and Black Jesus. Simone Felice left the Felice Brothers in 2009. He now leads his own band - The Duke & the King (named after the duo of con-artists in Mark Twain's Adventures of Huckleberry Finn) with Robert "Chicken" Burke. They released their debut album - Nothing Gold Can Stay on Loose / Ramseur Records August 4, 2009, followed by Long Live the Duke & King in 2010. Simone released a self-titled album in 2012, followed that up with an album titled Strangers in 2014, and then released his third album titled The Projector in 2018.

== Discography ==
=== Albums and EPs ===
Year	Album	Label	Chart	Peak
2005	Iantown	Self-released		
2006	Through These Reins and Gone	Purest Searcher		
2007	Tonight at the Arizona	Loose / CORTEX		
2007	Adventures of The Felice Brothers Vol. 1	Carpenter		
2008	The Felice Brothers	Team Love / New York Pro / Loose		
2009	Yonder Is the Clock	Team Love	US Billboard 200	20
2010	Mix Tape	New York Pro		
2011	Celebration, Florida	Fat Possum / Loose	US Billboard 200	5
2011	Poughkeepsie Princess EP	self-released		
2012	God Bless You, Amigo	self-released		
2014	Favorite Waitress	Dualtone		
2015	Felice Navidad	self-released		
2016	Life in the Dark	Yep Roc		
2016	Country Ham	Yep Roc		
2017	Tonight at the Arizona Ltd Ed re-issue for Record Store Day	Loose		
2019	Undress	Yep Roc		
2021	From Dreams to Dust	Yep Roc		
2023	Asylum on the Hill	self-released		
2024	Valley of Abandoned Songs	Million Stars		

=== Singles ===
Year	Title	Album
2011	"Ponzi"	Celebration, Florida
2016	"Aerosol Ball"	Life in the Dark
2016	"Plunder"	Life in the Dark
2019	"Undress"	Undress
2019	"Poor Blind Birds"	Undress
2019	"Special Announcement"	Undress
2021	"Inferno"	From Dreams to Dust
2021	"Jazz on the Autobahn"	From Dreams to Dust
2021	"Silverfish"	From Dreams to Dust
2021	"To-Do List"	From Dreams to Dust
2024	"Crime Scene Queen"	Valley of Abandoned Songs
2024	"Flowers By The Roadside"	Valley of Abandoned Songs

== Cultural references ==
- The song "Whiskey In My Whiskey" is playing on the jukebox in Merlotte's bar in episode 7 of the first season of True Blood on HBO in 2008
- The end of the song "Frankie's Gun!" is featured in the British sitcom Outnumbered's 2009 Christmas Special, where all the family are seen singing along to it in the closing sequence.
- The song "Penn Station" was featured in the weather section on the Welcome to Night Vale podcast in 2014
- The band is briefly featured playing their song "Cumberland Gap" in the film Song One, 2014
- The song "Radio Song" plays on the jukebox in the bar where people are playing pool in the 2017 film Three Billboards Outside Ebbing, Missouri
- The song "Radio Song" also plays over the final scene in episode 15 Best enemies of the second season of Resident Alien on Syfy in 2022
- The song “Nail It on the First Try” plays over the final scene in the pilot episode of St. Denis Medical on NBC in 2024
