= Adventures of The Felice Brothers Vol. 1 =

Studio album by The Felice Brothers
- Released: 2007
- Genre: Americana, Folk rock
- Label: Team Love Records

The Felice Brothers chronology
Tonight At The Arizona (2007)	Adventures of The Felice Brothers Vol. 1 (2007)	The Felice Brothers (2008)

Adventures of The Felice Brothers Vol. 1 is available directly from The Felice Brothers at live shows. It was recorded on two-track tape in a chicken coop, "People seem to think that’s weird, but it was normal to us," Felice said. "It was like a little tiny dirty house". This album features "Frankie's Gun!", perhaps their most widely recognized song. Adventures of The Felice Brothers Vol. 1 was listed as number 3 on WDST's Top 25 Albums of 2007, being beat only by Bruce Springsteen and Levon Helm. Adventures also contains their covers of two classic folk songs. A song called Ruby Mae is also based on their grandpa's "old sweetheart" as the brothers say. "Where'd You Get the Liquor" is a version of "Old Dan Tucker" and "Glory Glory" is a rendition of "Since I Laid My Burden Down".

== Track listing ==
1. "Frankie's Gun!"
2. "Trouble Been Hard"
3. "Ruby Mae"
4. "Radio Song"
5. "Helen Fry (She's a Master of Disguise)"
6. "Walk a While"
7. "Whiskey in My Whiskey"
8. "Doris Day"
9. "Oxycontin"
10. "Where'd You Get the Liquor"
11. "The Devil Is Real"
12. "Glory Glory"
13. "San Antonio Burning"
