= God Bless You, Amigo =

Studio album by The Felice Brothers
- Released: 2012
- Recorded: Spring 2012
- Genres: Americana, folk, Folk rock

The Felice Brothers chronology
Celebration Florida (2011)	God Bless You, Amigo (2012)	Favorite Waitress (2014)

God Bless You, Amigo is a collection of home-recorded songs by The Felice Brothers. It was released via their website in 2012, allowing fans to choose how much to pay, with an initial minimum of $5. The album includes eight traditional songs and 12 of the band's own songs that had not been recorded previously.

== Track listing ==
1. "Sail Away Ladies" (Uncle Dave Macon) - 2:16
2. "Dream On" - 3:30
3. "How Long Must I Wait" - 3:57
4. "Jack of Diamonds" (Blind Lemon Jefferson) - 2:13
5. "Black Velvet Band" - 4:02
6. "Lincoln Continental" - 3:19
7. "Dead Dog" - 3:10
8. "Her Eyes Dart Round" - 3:48
9. "Red Mustang" - 4:35
10. "44 Special" - 3:20
11. "Panther at the Zoo" - 1:57
12. "Honey in the Rock" (The Carter Family) - 3:15
13. "Cumblerland Gap" (trad.) - 2:30
14. "Early Times" - 1:47
15. "The Mating of the Doves" - 3:49
16. "Been All Around This World" (trad.) - 1:56
17. "The Parting Glass" (trad.) - 2:43
18. "Mistral Boy" (trad.) - 3:02
19. "The Promised Land" - 4:28
20. "Gulf of Mexico" (trad.) - 2:36
