= In the Air (The Handsome Family album) =

2000 album by the Handsome Family

In The Air

Studio album by the Handsome Family
- Released: 2000
- Genre: Country; folk; bluegrass
- Length: 37:03
- Label: Carrot Top / Loose Music

The Handsome Family chronology
| Down in the Valley (1998) | In The Air (2000) | Twilight (2001) |

Professional ratings
Review scores
| Source | Rating |
|---|---|
| AllMusic | 4/5 stars |
| Spin | 8/10 |
| Village Voice | A− |
| Virgin Encyclopedia of Nineties Music | 3/5 stars |
| Encyclopedia of Popular Music | 3/4 stars |

In The Air is the fifth album released by the American band the Handsome Family. It was released in 2000 by Carrot Top Records (North America) / Loose Music (Europe) and comes as an enhanced audio CD with an additional video for the song "Amelia Earhart vs. The Dancing Bear," from Milk and Scissors (directed by Bill Ward).

Los Angeles Times critic Randall Roberts praised the "tender urgency" and "morbid wit" of the song "So Much Wine”, calling it "a little pearl of destruction" and "the perfect introduction to the Family’s world."

== Track listing ==
All music by Brett Sparks, all lyrics by Rennie Sparks.

1. "Don't Be Scared" – 2:39
2. "The Sad Milkman" – 3:40
3. "In The Air" – 3:30
4. "A Beautiful Thing" – 3:39
5. "So Much Wine" – 3:48
6. "Up Falling Rock Hill" – 2:57
7. "Poor, Poor Lenore" – 3:41
8. "When That Helicopter Comes" – 2:32
9. "Grandmother Waits For You" (inspired by "Where We'll Never Grow Old" as performed by The Smith Sacred Singers) – 3:50
10. "Lie Down" - 3:30
11. "My Beautiful Bride" - 3:17

== Additional Personnel ==
- Brad Miller - Band photo
- Andrew Bird - violin on "Poor, Poor Lenore", "Up Falling Rock Hill" and "When That Helicopter..."
- Darrel Sparks - back-up caterwaul on "When That Helicopter..."; guitar on "The Sad Milkman"
