= Through the Trees =

1998 album by the Handsome Family

Through The Trees

Studio album by the Handsome Family
- Released: April 6, 1998
- Genre: Country
- Length: 44:25
- Label: Carrot Top, Loose Music
- Producer: Dave Trumfio, Brett Sparks

The Handsome Family chronology
Invisible Hands (1997)	Through The Trees (1998)	Down in the Valley (1999)

Professional ratings
Review scores
Source	Rating
AllMusic	4.5/5 stars
Christgau's Consumer Guide	(3-star Honorable Mention)
Tom Hull – on the Web	B+
Encyclopedia of Popular Music	4/4 stars

Through the Trees is the third full-length album by the Handsome Family, released in 1998 on Carrot Top Records/Loose Music. The album has received significant critical praise, and is considered one of the band's best works.

== Recording ==
Through the Trees was written in the aftermath of Brett Sparks' mid-1990s hospitalization and diagnosis of bipolar disorder. The closing song, "My Ghost", was inspired by Brett's experiences in the psychiatric unit.

The album was recorded in a makeshift warehouse loft space in a run-down part of Chicago, using equipment lent to the band by Wilco's Jeff Tweedy, who was a friend and fan of their work. They had met each other through Tweedy's wife Sue Miller, owner of the Chicago club Lounge Ax. Rennie Sparks later told Folk Radio UK in an interview: "Jeff offered to let us borrow a bunch of gear he had but wasn’t using (an ADAT, a Mackie mixer, Lexicon reverb and a fabulous Tube-Tech compressor). This was a huge gift – Jeff gave us more than gear, he gave us time. We returned our rental equipment and slowed our work pace. We were finally recording music without worrying about how much money each hour was costing us. It completely changed how we worked." Tweedy also plays guitar and backing vocals on several songs.

== Reception ==
Mojo magazine named it one of the “10 Essential Americana Records Of All Time”. It was praised in the magazine's music encyclopedia The Mojo Collection as "an American gothic country classic: dark twisted, blackly comic tales of death and decay, drink, desperation and dead dogs." UNCUT named it the "Best New Country Album of the Year".

== Track listing ==
All music by Brett Sparks; all lyrics by Rennie Sparks, except as noted.

No.	Title	Lyrics	Length
1.	"Weightless Again"		3:40
2.	"My Sister's Tiny Hands"		3:27
3.	"Stalled"		2:28
4.	"Where The Birch Trees Lean"		3:22
5.	"Cathedrals"		3:24
6.	"Down In The Ground"		2:45
7.	"The Giant Of Illinois"		3:05
8.	"Down In The Valley Of Hollow Logs"		3:31
9.	"I Fell"		4:16
10.	"The Woman Downstairs"		4:49
11.	"Last Night I Went Out Walking"	Brett Sparks	4:26
12.	"Bury Me Here"		2:46
13.	"My Ghost"	Brett Sparks, Rennie Sparks	2:26
Total length:			44:25

== Personnel ==
- Brett & Rennie Sparks - voice, guitar, banjo, bass, dobro, melodica, autoharp, drum machine, piano, etc. except as follows
- Jeff Tweedy - backing vocals, tracks 3, 4, 5, 7; guitar, end of track 4; rhythm guitar, track 5
- Dave Trumfio - additional percussion; bass on "Stalled"
- Jessica Billey - violin on "Down In The Ground"
- Dave Smith and Dave Winer of The Baltimores - horns on "My Ghost"
- Brad Miller - band photo
