= Undress (The Felice Brothers album) =

Studio album by The Felice Brothers
- Released: May 3, 2019
- Length: 46:58
- Label: Yep Roc
- Producer: Jeremy Backofen

The Felice Brothers chronology
Life in the Dark (2016)	Undress (2019)

Professional ratings
Aggregate scores
Source	Rating
Metacritic	78/100
Review scores
Source	Rating
AllMusic	3.5/5 stars
American Songwriter	3/5 stars

Undress is a studio album by the American band The Felice Brothers. It was released on May 3, 2019, by Yep Roc Records.

== Critical reception ==
Undress was met with generally favorable reviews from critics. At Metacritic, which assigns a weighted average rating out of 100 to reviews from mainstream publications, this release received an average score of 78, based on six reviews.

== Track listing ==
No.	Title	Length
1.	"Undress"	3:52
2.	"Holy Weight Champ"	4:05
3.	"Special Announcement"	4:14
4.	"Nail It on the First Try"	2:10
5.	"Salvation Army Girl"	3:09
6.	"Poor Blind Birds"	5:47
7.	"TV Mama"	3:44
8.	"The Kid"	3:59
9.	"Hometown Hero"	3:38
10.	"Jack Reminiscing"	3:37
11.	"Days of the Years"	3:58
12.	"Socrates"	4:45

== Charts ==
Chart (2019)	Peak position
Scottish Albums (OCC)	52
UK Americana Albums (OCC)	5
UK Independent Albums (OCC)	28
US Heatseekers Albums (Billboard)	11
US Independent Albums (Billboard)	35
