= The Handsome Family =

US alternative country and Americana band

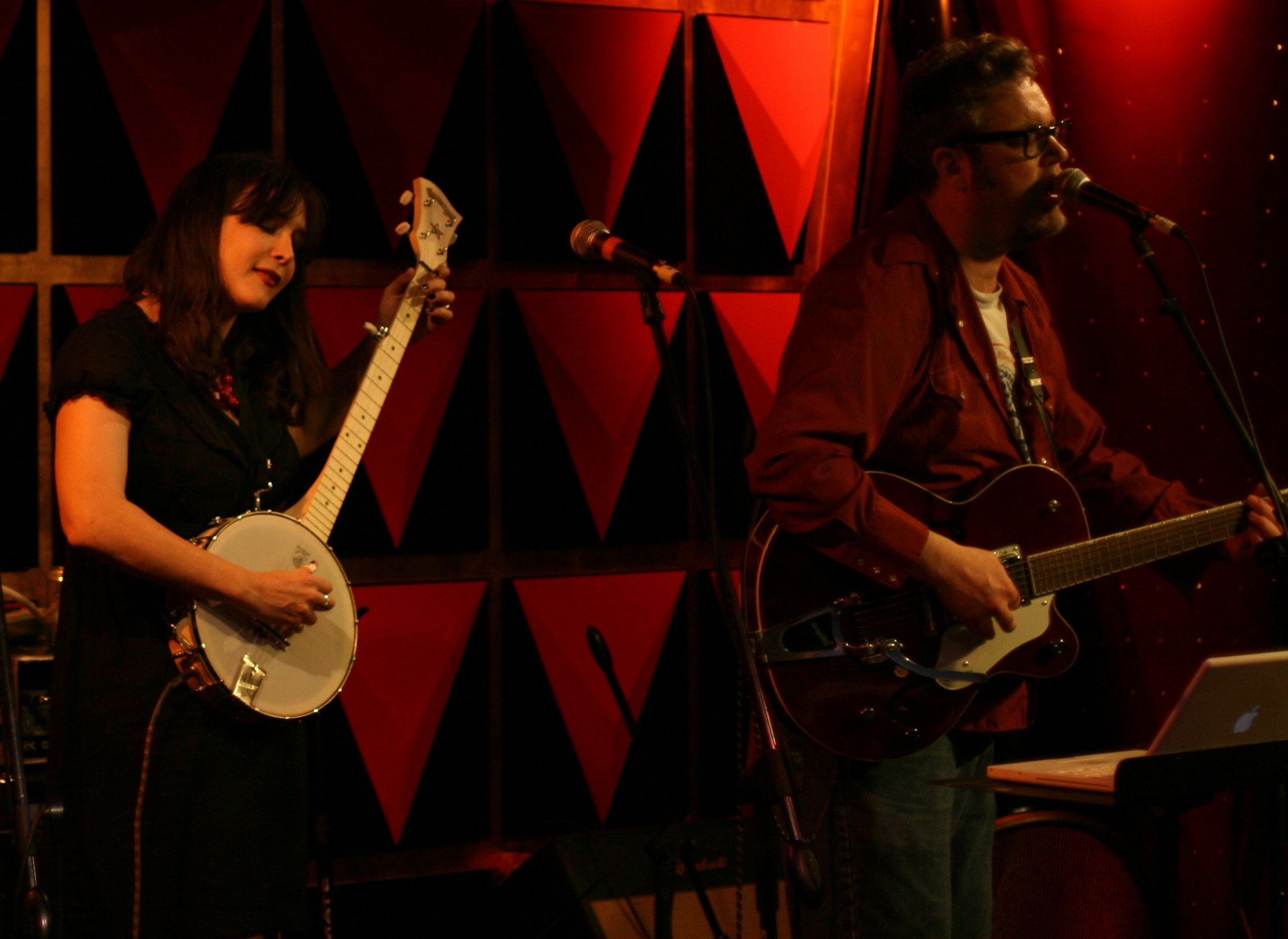
- The Handsome Family performing live in 2008

Background information
- Origin: Chicago, Illinois, US
- Genres: Gothic country; alternative country
- Years active: 1993–present
- Labels: Loose, Carrot Top, Scout Releases
- Members: Brett Sparks; Rennie Sparks
- Past members: Mike Werner
- Website: http://www.handsomefamily.com/

The Handsome Family is an American music duo consisting of husband and wife Brett and Rennie Sparks formed in Chicago, Illinois, and as of 2001 based in Albuquerque, New Mexico. They are perhaps best known for their song "Far from Any Road" from the album Singing Bones, which was used as the main title theme for the first season of the 2014 crime drama True Detective. The band's tenth album, Unseen, was released in 2016. The band's 11th studio album Hollow, was released on September 8, 2023.

== History ==
Husband-and-wife duo Brett Sparks (vocals, guitar, keyboards) and Rennie Sparks (bass, banjo, vocals) formed the band in 1993, along with drummer Mike Werner. The band would later revolve around Rennie, who writes the lyrics, and Brett, who writes the music. Guest musicians complete the band line-up for recordings and live work.

Regarding the band name, Brett said in an interview: "It's just kind of a stupid name. We used to have this really obnoxious drummer, and he used to call me 'Handsome', that was his nickname for me, I think for sarcastic reasons... And he wanted to call it the Handsome Family... and we thought it was funny, too. We thought it was a good name."

Brett is originally from Odessa, Texas and Rennie from Suffolk County, Long Island. The band toured extensively throughout both America and Europe in support of early releases Odessa (1994) and Milk and Scissors (1996). During that time, Brett suffered an emotional breakdown, resulting in his hospitalization and diagnosis of bipolar disorder.

They wrote their third full-length album, Through the Trees, in the aftermath of these events, and included a song, "My Ghost", inspired by Brett's experiences in the psychiatric unit. They recorded the album in 1998, using Jeff Tweedy's mobile studio, and brought the band to a wider audience. Uncut named it the "Best New Country Album of the Year".

A growing following and raised profile allowed Brett and Rennie to give up their day jobs and work on the band full time. They toured America and Europe again in support of the 2000 album In the Air. That year, Rennie's book of short stories, Evil, was released by Chicago publisher Black Hole Press. In 2001, they moved to Albuquerque, New Mexico, and released Twilight, with Allmusic opining that the album leads "the listener down a lovely yet dark trail few would dare tread twice". In 2002, they released a live album, Live at Schuba's Tavern, a recording from the In the Air tour from Chicago in December 2000.

The duo appeared in the 2003 documentary Searching for the Wrong-Eyed Jesus, as well as the soundtrack album released two years later.

They have subsequently released the albums Singing Bones (2003), Last Days of Wonder (2006), Honey Moon (2009), Wilderness (2013), and Unseen (2016) as well as the collections Smothered and Covered (2003) and Scattered (2010). Their latest album, Hollow, was released in September 2023.

The track "Far from Any Road", from the album Singing Bones, was used as the main title theme song for HBO's 2014 crime drama True Detective by the show's music director, T Bone Burnett. The Sydney Morning Herald included season one's opening sequence in their list of the "Ten of the Best" title sequences on television. The song later appeared in an episode of The Simpsons, and was used as intro music during Guns N' Roses' 2014 tour.

The band's tenth album, Unseen, was released on September 16, 2016, the first new release on the band's own label Milk & Scissors Music and through long-time label Loose in Europe. In a departure from recent prior albums, the main duo of Brett and Rennie Sparks were joined by three guest musicians: David Gutierrez (mandolin and dobro), Alex McMahon (guitar, baritone guitar, pedal steel), and Jason Toth (drums).

The band's 11th studio album Hollow, was released on September 8, 2023. The songs were written during the COVID-19 pandemic. The chorus of the album's lead single, "Joseph", was inspired by a nightmare of lyricist Rennie Sparks, who began talking in her sleep one night, shouting, "Come into the circle, Joseph. There’s no moon tonight!" Brett wrote the words down, and the duo fleshed out the song the next day.

== Musical style ==
The Handsome Family's music has been classified as gothic country or gothic Americana, alternative country, avant-country, country, country blues, country rock, gothic folk, roots rock and traditional country. The Handsome Family's style is a blend of country, bluegrass, and murder ballads. Early recordings have rock elements, but these were less evident from 1996's Milk and Scissors onwards. The duo's penchant for a tongue-in-cheek, macabre approach has been noted by many critics; Andy Fyfe of Mojo called them "Americana's ghostly Sonny & Cher." A.V. Club reviewer Christopher Bahn compared their music to "a collaboration between Hank Williams and Edgar Allan Poe."

Rennie's lyrics have a strong storytelling component, drawing on themes from Gothic fiction, as well as American folk music, and often involving macabre subjects as murders, suicides and ghosts. Some songs are also based on actual historical figures or events, including the lives and deaths of Amelia Earhart ("Amelia Earhart vs. the Dancing Bear", on Milk and Scissors), Emily Shore ("Emily Shore 1819–1839", on Milk and Scissors), Robert Wadlow ("The Giant of Illinois", on Through the Trees), Natalie Wood ("Natalie Wood", an outtake from Twilight, which appears on Smothered and Covered), and Nikola Tesla ("Tesla's Hotel Room", on Last Days of Wonder). The title of Last Days of Wonder is a reference to Puritan scientist and witch-hunter Cotton Mather's 1693 book Wonders of the Invisible World, which Rennie found intriguing because of what she called its "madness brimming under the surface of things."

== Covers ==
The Handsome Family's songs have been covered repeatedly by musician Andrew Bird, including a full-length album of covers released in 2014, Things Are Really Great Here, Sort Of…

Wilco’s Jeff Tweedy regularly performs "So Much Wine" in concert.

Sally Timms of the Mekons covered three Handsome Family songs—"The Sad Milkman", "Snowbird", and "Drunk By Noon"—on her 1999 album Cowboy Sally's Twilight Laments for Lost Buckaroos.

In 2022, Bird also contributed to Phoebe Bridgers's holiday cover of their song "So Much Wine" from In the Air alongside Irish actor Paul Mescal and bandmates Marshall Vore and Harrison Whitford. The proceeds from sales of the cover, as with all of Bridgers's holiday covers, go to the Los Angeles LGBT Center.

== Honors and awards ==
In 2014, Chicago city alderman Robert Fioretti sponsored a resolution declaring September 5, 2014 as "Brett and Rennie Sparks Day" in Chicago "for their exceptional and distinctive talents and noteworthy artistic contributions".

== Discography ==
=== Albums ===
- Odessa (1994) Carrot Top / Scout Releases
- Milk and Scissors (1996) Carrot Top / Scout Releases
- Through the Trees (1998) Carrot Top / Loose
- In the Air (2000) Carrot Top / Loose
- Twilight (2001) Carrot Top / Loose
- Singing Bones (2003) Carrot Top / Loose
- Last Days of Wonder (2006) Carrot Top / Loose
- Honey Moon (2009) Carrot Top / Loose
- Wilderness (2013) Carrot Top / Loose
- Unseen (2016) Milk & Scissors Music / Loose
- Hollow (2023) Milk & Scissors Music

Compilations and live albums

- Down in the Valley (1999) Independent Records (Ireland-only release)
- Live at Schuba's [sic] Tavern (2002) Digital Club Network [The tavern is actually named Schubas, for the two Schuba brothers.]
- Smothered and Covered (2002) Handsome Family Music
- Scattered (2010) Handsome Family Music
- "Tower of Song" - Too Late to Pray: Defiant Chicago Roots (2019) Bloodshot Records

=== EPs ===
- Invisible Hands (1997) Carrot Top Records / Scout Releases (Vinyl-only release)
- In the Forest of Missing Airplanes (2007)

=== Singles ===
- "My Beautiful Bride" b/w "Destroy, Destroy" (1999) Magwheel (7" split w/ Sackville)
- "Drunk by Noon" b/w "The Blizzard" (2008) Carrot Top Records
- "Far from Any Road" (2015)
