= Twilight (The Handsome Family album) =

2001 album by the Handsome Family

Studio album by the Handsome Family
- Released: 2001
- Genre: Country
- Length: 44:43
- Label: Carrot Top / Loose Music

The Handsome Family chronology
In the Air (2000)	Twilight (2001)	Live at Schuba's Tavern (2002)

Professional ratings
Review scores
Source	Rating
AllMusic	3.5/5 stars
Drowned in Sound	8/10
Encyclopedia of Popular Music	3/4 stars
Tom Hull – on the Web	B+
The Independent	4/5 stars
Los Angeles Times	3.5/4 stars
Pitchfork	8.5/10
RTÉ	3/5 stars
The Village Voice	A−

Twilight is the sixth album by the Handsome Family. It was released 2001 by Carrot Top Records (North America) / Loose Music (Europe).

== Track listing ==
1. "The Snow White Diner" – 4:01
2. "Passenger Pigeons" – 4:29
3. "A Dark Eye" – 3:53
4. "There Is a Sound" – 3:26
5. "All the TVs in Town" – 3:05
6. "Gravity" – 3:08
7. "Cold, Cold, Cold" – 3:10
8. "No One Fell Asleep Alone" – 2:48
9. "I Know You Are There" – 3:40
10. "Birds You Cannot See" - 2:53
11. "The White Dog" - 3:36
12. "So Long" - 3:31
13. "Peace in the Valley Once Again" - 3:03

== Personnel ==
- The Handsome Family
  - Brett Sparks - wrote and played all music except as follows
  - Rennie Sparks - all lyrics, all female vocals, autoharp
