= Odessa (The Handsome Family album) =

1994 debut album by the Handsome Family

Studio album by the Handsome Family
- Released: 1994
- Recorded: Kingsize Sound Laboratories, Chicago, Illinois
- Genre: Rock
- Length: 47:16
- Label: Carrot Top
- Producer: Dave Trumfio, Brett Sparks

The Handsome Family chronology
| Odessa (1994) | Milk and Scissors (1996) |

Professional ratings
Review scores
| Source | Rating |
|---|---|
| AllMusic | 3/5 stars |
| The Encyclopedia of Popular Music | 3/5 stars |
| Tom Hull – on the Web | A− |

Odessa is the first album by American band the Handsome Family. It was released 1994 by Carrot Top Records.

== Critical reception ==
AllMusic wrote that "Brett Sparks' plain but resonant Midwestern twang gives the songs on Odessa the ring of common truth, and he and Rennie Sparks had already established themselves as writers to be reckoned with, conjuring a lyrical voice that sounds homey and terribly alienated at the same time." Greil Marcus called the album an effort to "transfer the fatalism of the old murder ballads into modern life." Trouser Press wrote that "if Odessa has a fault, it’s lyrics that are sometimes too coyly knowing, tossing off pop cultural references to no real effect."

== Track listing ==
1. "Here's Hopin'" – 3:26
2. "Arlene" – 3:37
3. "Pony" – 3:13
4. "One Way Up" – 3:19
5. "Water Into Wine" – 3:12
6. "Giant Ant" – 3:30
7. "Everything That Rises Must Converge" – 2:50
8. "Gorilla" – 3:37
9. "The Last" – 3:36
10. "Claire Said" - 3:41
11. "Moving Furniture Around" - 3:03
12. "Big Bad Wolf" - 3:18
13. "She Awoke With A Jerk" - 4:19
14. "Happy Harvest" - 2:35

== Personnel ==
- The Handsome Family
  - Brett Sparks - guitar, vocals, keyboards
  - Rennie Sparks - bass, vocals, computer layout/design
  - Mike Werner - drums, vocals, art direction
- Dave Trumfio: acoustic guitar tracks 5, 7 and keyboards tracks 1, 4, 12
- Michael Hagler: 2nd guitar track 10, piano track 4
- Steve Thomas: pedal steel tracks 2, 5
- Mike Werner - art direction
- Diane Murphy - band photo
- Sheila Sachs - computer layout/design
