= Milk and Scissors =

1996 album by the Handsome Family

Milk And Scissors

Studio album by the Handsome Family
- Released: May 14, 1996
- Recorded: Kingsize Sound Laboratories, Chicago, Illinois
- Length: 40:35
- Label: Carrot Top
- Producer: Dave Trumfio, The Handsome Family

The Handsome Family chronology
Odessa (1994)	Milk And Scissors (1996)	Invisible Hands (1997)

Professional ratings
Review scores
Source	Rating
AllMusic	2.5/5 stars
The Encyclopedia of Popular Music	4/5 stars
Tom Hull – on the Web	B+

Milk and Scissors is the second album by the American band the Handsome Family. It was released on May 14, 1996 by Carrot Top Records, and by Scout Releases in the same year.

== Production ==
The production of the album was interrupted by Brett's brief stay in a mental hospital.

== Critical reception ==
The Chicago Tribune called Milk and Scissors "one of the finest albums of 1996." The Chicago Reader called it "wonderfully depressing."

== Track listing ==
All music by Brett Sparks and all lyrics by Rennie Sparks, except as noted

1. "Lake Geneva" – 3:11
2. "Winnebago Skeletons" – 4:13
3. "Drunk By Noon" – 2:51
4. "The House Carpenter" (traditional, arranged by The Handsome Family, inspired by Clarence Ashley's 1930 recording) – 3:36
5. "The Dutch Boy" – 3:51
6. "The King Who Wouldn't Smile" – 2:35
7. "Emily Shore 1819-1839" – 4:34
8. "3-Legged Dog" (Darrell Sparks)– 4:34
9. "#1 Country Song" (Brett Sparks) – 3:35
10. "Amelia Earhart vs. The Dancing Bear" - 3:13
11. "Tin Foil" - 2:41
12. "Puddin' Fingers" (Mike Werner) - 1:41

== Personnel ==
- The Handsome Family:
  - Brett Sparks - guitar, vocals, dobro, organ, harmonica, lap steel
  - Rennie Sparks - bass, vocals
  - Mike Werner - percussion
- Diane Murphy - band photo
- Brad Miller - cover photo
- Design by Rennie & Mike with Sheila Sachs
