= Loose Music =

Loose
- Founded: 1998
- Founder: Tom Bridgewater
- Distributor(s): The Orchard; Rough Trade
- Genre: Americana; Country; Folk; Alt-country; Alternative, Singer/Songwriter
- Country of origin: England
- Location: Ladbroke Grove, London
- Official website: http://www.loosemusic.com

Loose is a British independent record label based in Ladbroke Grove, London.

In 1998, Loose was formed from the vinyl only record label, Vinyl Junkie, which was set up in 1994 by Tom Bridgewater.

Since 1998, Loose has released music by the following artists: Sturgill Simpson, Giant Sand, Townes Van Zandt, Steve Earle, M Ward, Mark Mulcahy, Neko Case, The Handsome Family, The Felice Brothers, Dawes, Deer Tick, Hurray for the Riff Raff, Justin Townes Earle and Grand Drive.

== Current artists ==
- The Americans
- Barna Howard
- Brown Horse
- Carson McHone
- Courtney Marie Andrews
- Damien Jurado
- Danny and the Champions of the World
- Frankie Lee
- Frontier Ruckus
- Gill Landry
- The Handsome Family
- Ian Felice (The Felice Brothers)
- Israel Nash
- Jim White
- Joana Serrat
- Native Harrow
- Sons of Bill
- Treetop Flyers
- Vetiver
- Willard Grant Conspiracy
- William The Conqueror
