= Third Eye Blind discography =

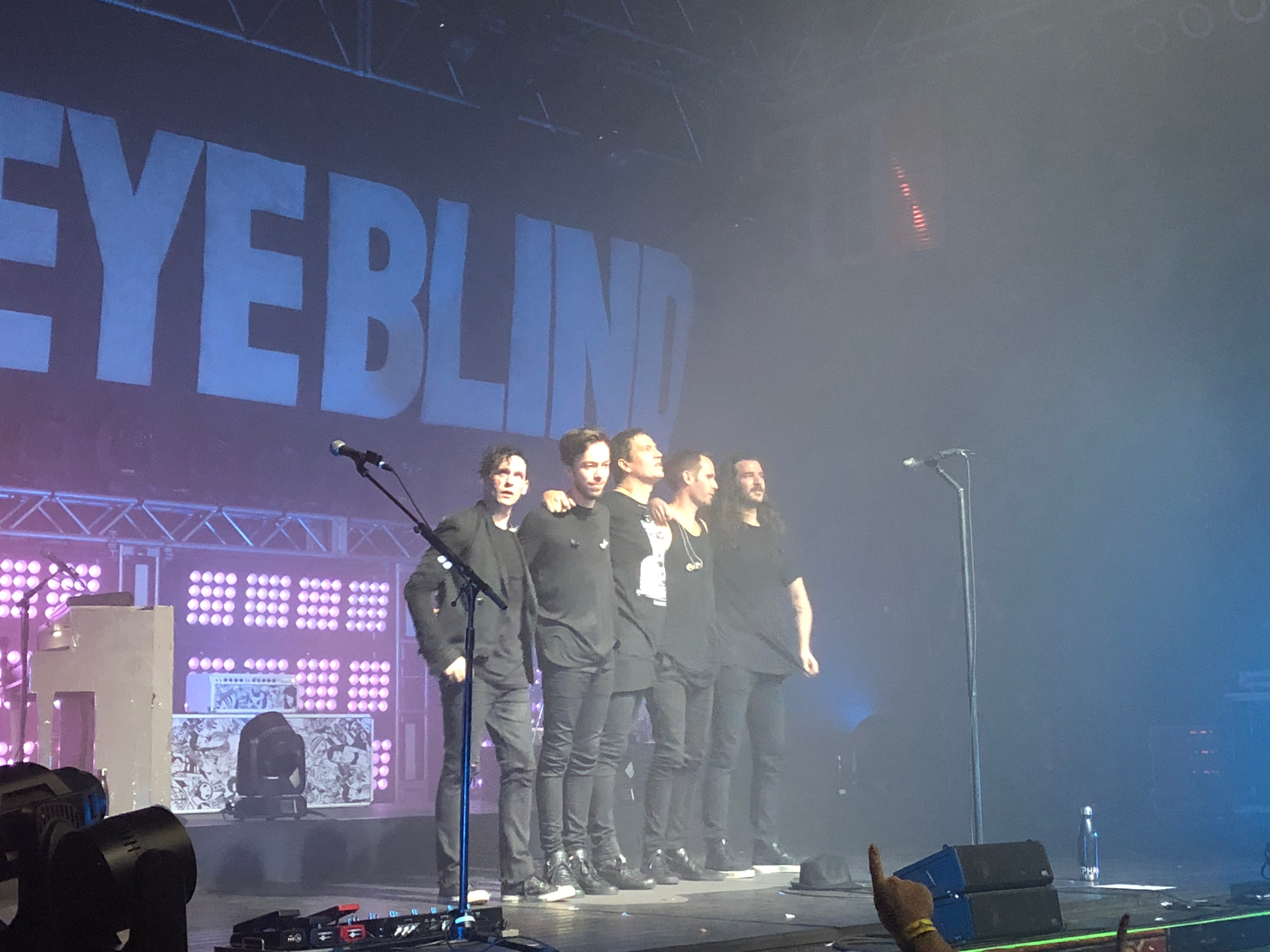
- Third Eye Blind on stage in Orlando on October 28, 2017
- Studio albums: 7
- Extended plays: 3
- Live albums: 2
- Compilation albums: 3
- Singles: 31
- Promotional singles: 3
- Music videos: 42

Third Eye Blind is an American alternative rock band formed in San Francisco, California, in 1993. The group's discography consists of seven studio albums, two live albums, three compilation albums, three extended plays, 31 singles, three promotional singles, and 42 music videos. The current line-up consists of Stephan Jenkins, Brad Hargreaves, Kryz Reid, Colin Creev, and Alex LeCavalier. They have amassed worldwide album sales of over 12 million units.

After signing with Elektra Records, Third Eye Blind released their self-titled debut album in 1997. Helped by the singles "Semi-Charmed Life", "Graduate", "How's It Going to Be", "Losing a Whole Year", and "Jumper", the album peaked at number 25 on the Billboard 200 chart, sold six million copies, and went six times platinum in the United States. "Semi-Charmed Life" peaked at number four on the Billboard Hot 100. Their second album, 1999's Blue, included "Anything", "Never Let You Go", "10 Days Late", and "Deep Inside of You". Blue peaked at number 40 and went platinum in the US.

Third Eye Blind released their third album, Out of the Vein, after a three-year hiatus. It peaked at number 12, but only one single from the album ("Blinded") charted, and the album has not been certified. In 2004, the band's record label ceased to exist. They released the compilation album A Collection in 2006 and the extended play Red Star in 2008. In 2009, their fourth studio album, Ursa Major, was released. It peaked at number three in the US but did not have any singles that charted. Their fifth studio album, Dopamine, was released six years later in 2015 and peaked at number 13 in the US. Jenkins announced that the band would cease making full-length albums in favor of making smaller EP releases. In 2016 the band released the EP We Are Drugs, which was followed two years later by Thanks for Everything. Despite Jenkins' previous statement that they wouldn't release any more full-length albums, Third Eye Blind released their sixth album, Screamer, in 2019 and seventh album, Our Bande Apart, in 2021.

== Albums ==
=== Studio albums ===
List of studio albums, with selected chart positions, sales figures and certifications
Title	Details	Peak chart positions				Sales	Certifications
Title	Details	US	AUS	CAN	NZ	Sales	Certifications
Third Eye Blind	Released: April 8, 1997; Label: Elektra; Formats: CD, LP, cassette, digital download, streaming	25	51	34	20	World: 6,107,050	RIAA: 6× Platinum; MC: Platinum; RMNZ: Gold
Blue	Released: November 23, 1999; Label: Elektra; Formats: CD, LP, cassette, digital download, streaming	40	—	—	34	World: 2,000,000	RIAA: Platinum
Out of the Vein	Released: May 13, 2003; Label: Elektra; Formats: CD, LP, cassette, digital download, streaming	12	—	29	—		
Ursa Major	Released: August 18, 2009; Label: Mega Collider; Formats: CD, LP, digital download, streaming	3	—	—	—		
Dopamine	Released: June 16, 2015; Label: Mega Collider; Formats: CD, LP, digital download, streaming	13	—	—	—		
Screamer	Released: October 18, 2019; Label: Mega Collider; Formats: CD, LP, digital download, streaming	— (Note: Screamer did not enter the US Billboard 200, but peaked at number 18 on the Top Album Sales chart.)	—	—	—		
Our Bande Apart	Released: September 24, 2021; Label: Mega Collider; Formats: CD, LP, digital download, streaming	— (Note: Our Bande Apart did not enter the US Billboard 200, but peaked at number 64 on the Top Current Album Sales chart.)	—	—	—		
"—" denotes a recording that did not chart or was not released in that territory.

=== Live albums ===
List of live albums
Title	Details
Summer Gods Tour Live 2017	Released: November 24, 2017; Label: Mega Collider; Formats: CD, LP, digital download, streaming
Live at Red Rocks	Released: June 25, 2024; Label: Mega Collider; Formats: Digital download, streaming

=== Compilation albums ===
List of compilation albums, with selected chart positions
Title	Details	Peak chart positions
Title	Details	US
A Collection	Released: July 11, 2006; Label: Elektra; Formats: CD, digital download, streaming	103
The Third Eye Blind Collection	Released: November 11, 2013; Label: Elektra, Rhino; Formats: CD, digital download	—
Unplugged	Released: June 24, 2022; Label: Mega Collider; Formats: CD, LP, digital download, streaming	—
"—" denotes a recording that did not chart or was not released in that territory.

== Extended plays ==
List of extended plays, with selected chart positions
Title	Details	Peak chart positions
Title	Details	US
Red Star	Released: November 18, 2008; Label: MRI; Formats: CDr, digital download	—
We Are Drugs	Released: October 7, 2016; Label: Mega Collider; Formats: EP, digital download, streaming	175
Thanks for Everything	Released: August 24, 2018; Label: Mega Collider; Formats: CD, EP, digital download, streaming	— (Note: Thanks for Everything did not enter the US Billboard 200, but peaked at number 56 on the Top Album Sales chart.)
"—" denotes a recording that did not chart or was not released in that territory.

== Singles ==
=== As lead artist ===
List of singles as lead artist, with selected chart positions and certifications, showing year released and album name
Title	Year	Peak chart positions										Certifications	Album
Title	Year	US	US Adult	US Alt.	US Pop	AUS	CAN	ICE	NZ	SCO	UK	Certifications	Album
"Semi-Charmed Life"	1997	4	3	1	1	8	2	20	—	26	33	RIAA: 4× Platinum; ARIA: Gold; BPI: Silver; RMNZ: 3× Platinum	Third Eye Blind
"Graduate"	1997	—	—	14	—	87	—	—	—	—	83		Third Eye Blind
"How's It Going to Be"	1997	9	5	5	14	93	6	32	—	47	51	RIAA: 2× Platinum; RMNZ: Gold	Third Eye Blind
"Losing a Whole Year"	1997	—	—	13	—	—	—	—	—	—	—		Third Eye Blind
"Jumper"	1998	5	5	9	2	—	10	—	—	—	—	RIAA: 3× Platinum; RMNZ: Gold	Third Eye Blind
"Anything"	1999	—	—	11	—	—	—	—	—	—	—		Blue
"Never Let You Go"	2000	14	3	4	5	63	1	26	15	—	195	RIAA: Platinum; RMNZ: Gold	Blue
"10 Days Late"	2000	—	—	21	—	—	—	—	—	—	—		Blue
"Deep Inside of You"	2000	69	18	39	26	—	43	—	—	—	—		Blue
"Blinded (When I See You)"	2003	— (Note: "Blinded (When I See You)" did not enter the Billboard Hot 100, but peaked at number 16 on the Bubbling Under Hot 100 Singles chart.)	17	35	34	—	—	—	—	—	—		Out of the Vein
"Crystal Baller"	2003	—	—	—	—	—	—	—	—	—	—		Out of the Vein
"Don't Believe a Word"	2009	—	—	—	—	—	—	—	—	—	—		Ursa Major
"Bonfire"	2009	—	—	—	—	—	—	—	—	—	—		Ursa Major
"Everything Is Easy"	2015	—	39	—	—	—	—	—	—	—	—		Dopamine
"Get Me Out of Here"	2015	—	—	—	—	—	—	—	—	—	—		Dopamine
"Cop vs. Phone Girl"	2016	—	—	—	—	—	—	—	—	—	—		We Are Drugs
"Fuck Forever"	2018	—	—	—	—	—	—	—	—	—	—		Thanks for Everything
"Joke"	2018	—	—	—	—	—	—	—	—	—	—		Thanks for Everything
"10"	2018	—	—	—	—	—	—	—	—	—	—		Thanks for Everything
"Screamer" (featuring Alexis Krauss)	2019	—	—	—	—	—	—	—	—	—	—		Screamer
"Walk Like Kings"	2019	—	—	—	—	—	—	—	—	—	—		Screamer
"The Kids Are Coming (To Take You Down)"	2019	—	—	—	—	—	—	—	—	—	—		Screamer
"Disorder"	2020	—	—	—	—	—	—	—	—	—	—		Non-album single
"Box of Bones"	2021	—	—	—	—	—	—	—	—	—	—		Our Bande Apart
"Again"	2021	—	—	—	—	—	—	—	—	—	—		Our Bande Apart
"To the Sea"	2021	—	—	—	—	—	—	—	—	—	—		Our Bande Apart
"Like a Lullaby"	2025	—	—	—	—	—	—	—	—	—	—		Non-album single
"—" denotes a single that did not chart or was not released in that territory.

=== As featured artist ===
List of singles as featured artist, showing year released and album name
Title	Year	Album
"Traffic Light" (Justine Bennett featuring Third Eye Blind)	2012	Non-album single

=== Promotional singles ===
List of promotional singles, showing year released and album name
Title	Year	Album
"Cry, Cry, Cry" (featuring Merle Haggard)	2003	Non-album single
"If There Ever Was a Time"	2011	Occupy This Album
"Mine"	2015	Non-album single

== Other appearances ==
List of non-single other appearances, showing year released and album name
Title	Year	Album
"Tattoo of the Sun"	1996	Live 105 10 Year Anniversary: 1986–1996
"One of Those Christmas Days"	1997	Best of Kevin & Bean: A Family Christmas in Your Ass
"Horror Show"	1999	Varsity Blues: Music from & Inspired by the Motion Picture
"Train in Vain"	1999	Burning London: The Clash Tribute
"New Girl"	1999	American Pie: Music from the Motion Picture
"Eye Conqueror"	2001	A Knight's Tale: Music from the Motion Picture
"There's No Hurry to Eternity"	2011	Live from Nowhere Near You, Vol. II

== Music videos ==
List of music videos, showing year released and directors
Title	Year	Director(s)
"Semi-Charmed Life"	1997	Jamie Morgan
"How's It Going to Be"	1997	Nigel Dick
"Losing a Whole Year"	1997	Francis Lawrence
"Jumper"	1998	Yariv Gaber
"Never Let You Go"	2000	Chris Hafner
"10 Days Late"	2000	Francis Lawrence
"Deep Inside of You"	2000	Chris Applebaum
"Blinded (When I See You)"	2003	Stephan Jenkins
"Don't Believe a Word"	2009	Jay Blakesberg and Dave Alexander
"Non-Dairy Creamer"	2009	—N/a
"Bonfire"	2010	Stephan Jenkins
"Slow Motion" (Live)	2011	—N/a
"If There Ever Was a Time"	2012	Jeff Brissette
"Mine"	2015	Samuel Davenport
"Everything Is Easy"	2015	—N/a
"Get Me Out of Here"	2015	Gavin Michael Booth
"All the Souls"	2016	—N/a
"Company of Strangers"	2017	—N/a
"Weightless"	2017	Gavin Michael Booth
"Joke"	2018	Kryz Reid
"Blood Bank"	2018	Kryz Reid
"Song to the Siren"	2019	Kryz Reid
"Screamer"	2019	—N/a
"The Kids Are Coming (To Take You Down)"	2019	Stephan Jenkins
"Who Am I"	2019	—N/a
"Tropic Scorpio"	2019	Kryz Reid
"2X Tigers"	2020	—N/a
"Ways"	2020	Stephan Jenkins
"Disorder"	2020	Kryz Reid
"Horror Show"	2021	Kryz Reid
"Box of Bones"	2021	—N/a
"Again"	2021	—N/a
"To the Sea"	2021	Ryan Olson
"Goodbye to the Days of Ladies and Gentlemen"	2021	—N/a
"The Dying Blood"	2021	—N/a
"Dust Storm (How We Hold Each Other Right Now)"	2021	Juan Aguas Media & Dylan DeMarko
"Time in Berlin"	2021	Javier Blanco Chiocchio
"Funeral Singers"	2021	Kryz Reid
"Silverlake Neophyte"	2021	Kryz Reid
"Second Born"	2022	—N/a
"Funeral Singers (Live at Red Rocks)"	2024	Kryz Reid
"Like a Lullaby"	2025	Evan B. Stone
