= Symphony of Decay =

EP by Third Eye Blind
- Released: Unreleased
- Recorded: 2000–2004
- Genre: Rock
- Label: Elektra
- Producer: Stephan Jenkins

Symphony of Decay is an unreleased EP by American alternative rock band Third Eye Blind. The EP started off under the working title Black as a companion to their platinum selling 1999 album Blue. Its creation was a result of a compromise over the release method of the track "Slow Motion"; the band had wanted it on Blue, while their record label, Elektra Records, opposed its inclusion on such a high-profile full-length album release due to its controversial lyrics. The EP would go through years of delays for a multitude of reasons, including extensive touring, prioritizing the completion of their third studio album Out of the Vein, and complications arising from parting ways with Elektra in 2004. The EP itself was never collectively released, though many of the tracks were eventually released elsewhere.

== Background ==
After the band's six times platinum-selling self-titled Third Eye Blind album, the band reconvened to record a follow-up album, Blue, in early 1999. During the Blue sessions, the band recorded a track called "Slow Motion" which had been used in their 1994 demo tape. However, Elektra, the band's record label, did not approve of the song's lyrical content about a student who shoots a teacher's son, with the Columbine High School massacre having just occurred the same year. The band argued with the label for over four months over the content and its inclusion on the album. The final agreement between the two parties was that the song could only be on the album as an instrumental, but in return, Elektra would finance a separate EP where the song could be placed with its full controversial lyrics.

While the arrangement was made just prior to the release of Blue, work on the EP, tentatively titled Black as a companion release to Blue, wasn't set to begin until late 2000, upon completion of the "Red Summer Sun Tour" in support of Blue. However, in 2000, frontman Stephan Jenkins fell into a state of depression, which led him to recluse himself into a productive period of writing, resulting in over 40 new songs. This activity led the band to focus on releasing another full-length album first - what would become Out of the Vein - with intentions of releasing an EP afterwards. After the Out of the Vein sessions, the band started referring to the EP title as Symphony of Decay. A month after the release of Out of the Vein, in June 2003, Jenkins stated to VH1 that the band planned on releasing the EP as soon as September of the same year. However, the EP was later delayed into 2004, and then again into 2005. Drummer Brad Hargreaves, in late 2004, indicated that the EP had become tied up with difficulties with their record label, with Elektra dropping the band after the low sales of Out of the Vein.

== Concept ==
The terms of the compromise resulting in the EP's conception gave the band considerable freedom in their work; it was financed by Elektra, but ultimately treated as an independent release, allowing the band creative control. The EP was envisioned as a seven to eight song release where the songs would flow together and collectively have a run-time of about 50 minutes, resulting in lengthier run-times for some songs. Jenkins described the band's intent as wanting to "perform like a little symphony" to ultimately "make something really beautiful", while the band's manager at the time, Eric Godtland, stated that they would be "stringing together songs" to create "more of a cohesive vision that flows."

== Aftermath ==
While the EP was never officially released, a number of the tracks eventually found release in various forms. The full-lyrics version of "Slow Motion" finally found a vehicle for its official release in the band's 2006 greatest hits album A Collection. The vocals and piano recording of "My Time in Exile" was also included on A Collection. The track "Carnival Barker", in its entirety, was released as a free download by the band in 2006, while a brief clip of it was included as the closing track of the band's fourth album, Ursa Major. The track "There's No Hurry to Eternity" was eventually released on the charity benefit compilation album Live from Nowhere Near You Vol. II in 2011. The track had previously been titled as "Elliott Smith". "Knife in the Water", "Animal", and the full band version of "My Time in Exile" all unofficially leaked onto the internet between 2005 and 2006. No versions of "Star Wars" or "Swimming" have ever been released or leaked, although the latter was temporarily listed as a potential track for Ursa Major.

In 2008, the band would finally release an EP, the unrelated, politically-themed three track EP Red Star.

== Track list ==
Symphony of Decay

No.	Title	Length
1.	"Animal"	2:52
2.	"My Time in Exile (full band version)"	3:40
3.	"Star Wars"	-
4.	"Carnival Barker"	7:11
5.	"Slow Motion"	4:34
6.	"Swimming"	-
7.	"Elliott Smith/There's No Hurry to Eternity"	6:16
8.	"Knife in the Water"	4:27

== Personnel ==
- Stephan Jenkins – lead vocals, drums on "There's No Hurry to Eternity"
- Tony Fredianelli – lead guitar
- Arion Salazar – bass, guitar on "There's No Hurry to Eternity"
- Brad Hargreaves – drums, percussion
