= Anything (Third Eye Blind song) =

1999 single by Third Eye Blind

Single by Third Eye Blind

from the album Blue
- Released: November 2, 1999
- Genre: Pop-punk
- Length: 2:00
- Label: Elektra
- Songwriter: Stephan Jenkins
- Producers: Stephan Jenkins; The Mud Sisters; Arion Salazar; Third Eye Blind

Third Eye Blind singles chronology
"Jumper" (1998)	"Anything" (1999)	"Never Let You Go" (1999)

"Anything" is a song by American rock band Third Eye Blind from their second studio album, Blue (1999). It was released to radio as the lead single from the album on November 2, 1999, by Elektra Records.

== Background ==
Frontman Stephan Jenkins is credited as the sole writer of the song, whilst production was collectively helmed by Jenkins, the Mud Sisters, Arion Salazar, and Third Eye Blind. The song peaked at number 11 on the Billboard Modern Rock chart and number 35 on the Mainstream Rock chart. Upon release, reviews were mostly positive.

Jason Carmer stated during a discussion that Jenkins was adamant about "Anything" being the lead single despite its length, and that the radio edit (which was included on the single release) was created at Elektra's request. It is the only single released from the first three studio albums that did not appear on the band's greatest hits compilation album A Collection.

== Critical reception ==
Elysa Gardner of Entertainment Weekly commented that the song "hints at the band's growing sophistication." AllMusic's Stephen Thomas Erlewine and The A.V. Club writer Stephen Thompson both praised the song, with the latter describing it as "two minutes of pop joy".

== Live performances ==
Third Eye Blind first performed the song on August 19, 1999, during a performance at the Maritime Hall in San Francisco, California.

== Charts ==
Weekly chart performance for "Anything"
Chart (1999)	Peak position
US Alternative Airplay (Billboard)	11
US Mainstream Rock (Billboard)	35

== Release history ==
Region	Date	Formats(s)	Label(s)	Ref.
United States	November 2, 1999	Mainstream rock; active rock; alternative radio	Elektra; EEG	
