= Deep Inside of You =

2000 single by Third Eye Blind

Single by Third Eye Blind

from the album Blue
- B-side: "Anything" (acoustic); "1000 Julys"
- Released: July 10, 2000
- Studio: The Mud Room and Toast (San Francisco); The Plant (Sausalito)
- Length: 4:11
- Label: Elektra
- Songwriter: Stephan Jenkins
- Producers: Stephan Jenkins; The Mud Sisters; Arion Salazar; Third Eye Blind

Third Eye Blind singles chronology
| "10 Days Late" (2000) | "Deep Inside of You" (2000) | "Blinded" (2003) |

Music video
- "Deep Inside of You" on YouTube

"Deep Inside of You" is a song by American rock band Third Eye Blind from their second studio album, Blue (1999). It was released as the fourth and final single from the album on July 10, 2000, by Elektra Records. According to frontman Stephan Jenkins, the song is about "suicidal tendencies". The song received positive reviews from music critics. The song peaked at number 69 on the US Billboard Hot 100.

== Background and release ==
"Deep Inside of You" was written solely by frontman Stephan Jenkins. Jenkins explained that the song was written about "life's messier moments", commenting that he was inspired by the same woman who had inspired him to write the band's debut studio album, Third Eye Blind (1997). Despite the song's inclusion on Blue (1999) and eventual single release, guitarist Kevin Cadogan strongly objected to the commercial release of the song in addition to "Never Let You Go".

The song was released as a single on July 10, 2000, to US triple A and adult contemporary-oriented radio; the following day, it was sent to contemporary hit and alternative radio. Following the scrapping of Symphony of Decay, an extended play that was intended to be a companion to Blue, "Deep Inside of You" was included on Third Eye Blind's first greatest hits album, A Collection (2006). The song was also included on the soundtrack to the 2000 American comedy film Me, Myself & Irene.

== Chart performance ==
In the United States, "Deep Inside of You" debuted at number 80 on the Billboard Hot 100 chart, earning the title of "Hot Shot Debut". The song spent a total of 12 weeks in the top 100, peaking at number 69 on October 7, 2000. On both the Triple-A Tracks and Mainstream Top 40 charts, the single peaked at number 26. It was also a top-40 hit on the Adult Top 40 and Modern Rock Tracks listings, reaching number 18 and 39, respectively. In Canada, "Deep Inside of You" climbed to number 43 on the RPM 100 Hit Tracks chart on the issue dated September 18, 2000. On the RPM Top 30 Rock Report, it peaked at number 26.

== Music video ==
The song's music video was directed by Chris Applebaum and premiered in August 2000.

== Track listing ==
- Australian CD single
1. "Deep Inside of You" – 4:11
2. "Anything" (acoustic version) – 1:47
3. "1000 Julys" (live at the X-Lounge) – 3:47

== Credits and personnel ==
Credits and personnel are adapted from "Deep Inside of You" CD single liner notes.

- Stephan Jenkins – vocals, guitar, Memory Moog
- Kevin Cadogan – guitar
- Arion Salazar – bass, vocals, guitar, Wurlitzer, piano
- Brad Hargreaves – drums, vocals
- Jason Carmer – engineering
- Mike Cresswell – assistant engineer
- Tom Lord-Alge – mixing at Encore Studios (Burbank)
- Mauricio Iragorri – assistant engineer at Encore Studios

== Charts ==
=== Weekly charts ===
| Chart (2000) | Peak position |
|---|---|
| Canada Top Singles (RPM) | 43 |
| Canada Rock/Alternative (RPM) | 26 |
| US Billboard Hot 100 | 69 |
| US Adult Alternative Airplay (Billboard) | 26 |
| US Adult Pop Airplay (Billboard) | 18 |
| US Alternative Airplay (Billboard) | 39 |
| US Pop Airplay (Billboard) | 26 |

=== Year-end charts ===
| Chart (2000) | Position |
|---|---|
| US Adult Top 40 (Billboard) | 54 |
| US Mainstream Top 40 (Billboard) | 91 |

| Chart (2001) | Position |
|---|---|
| US Adult Top 40 (Billboard) | 96 |

== Release history ==
Release dates and formats for "Deep Inside of You"
| Region | Date | Formats(s) | Label | Ref. |
|---|---|---|---|---|
| United States | July 10, 2000 | Hot adult contemporary; modern adult contemporary; triple A radio | Elektra | |
| United States | July 11, 2000 | Contemporary hit; alternative radio | Elektra | |
