= List of Radio & Records number-one singles of the 1990s =

This is a list of songs in the music industry that have peaked at number-one on the Radio & Records singles chart in the 1990s.

== 1990 ==
Issue Date	Song	Artist(s)	Reference
January 5	"Another Day in Paradise" (Note: "Another Day in Paradise" spent an additional four weeks at number one in 1989.)	Phil Collins	
January 12	"How Am I Supposed to Live Without You"	Michael Bolton	
January 19	"How Am I Supposed to Live Without You"	Michael Bolton	
January 26	"Downtown Train"	Rod Stewart	
February 2	"Opposites Attract"	Paula Abdul and The Wild Pair	
February 9	"Opposites Attract"	Paula Abdul and The Wild Pair	
February 16	"Opposites Attract"	Paula Abdul and The Wild Pair	
February 23	"Escapade"	Janet Jackson	
March 2	"Escapade"	Janet Jackson	
March 9	"Escapade"	Janet Jackson	
March 16	"Escapade"	Janet Jackson	
March 23	"Love Will Lead You Back"	Taylor Dayne	
March 30	"Love Will Lead You Back"	Taylor Dayne	
April 6	"Don't Wanna Fall in Love"	Jane Child	
April 13	"Don't Wanna Fall in Love"	Jane Child	
April 20	"Nothing Compares 2 U"	Sinéad O'Connor	
April 27	"Nothing Compares 2 U"	Sinéad O'Connor	
May 4	"Nothing Compares 2 U"	Sinéad O'Connor	
May 11	"Vogue"	Madonna	
May 18	"Vogue"	Madonna	
May 25	"Vogue"	Madonna	
June 1	"Vogue"	Madonna	
June 8	"U Can't Touch This"	MC Hammer	
June 15	"It Must Have Been Love"	Roxette	
June 22	"Step by Step"	New Kids on the Block	
June 29	"Step by Step"	New Kids on the Block	
July 6	"She Ain't Worth It"	Glenn Medeiros featuring Bobby Brown	
July 13	"She Ain't Worth It"	Glenn Medeiros featuring Bobby Brown	
July 20	"She Ain't Worth It"	Glenn Medeiros featuring Bobby Brown	
July 27	"Vision of Love"	Mariah Carey	
August 3	"Vision of Love"	Mariah Carey	
August 10	"Vision of Love"	Mariah Carey	
August 17	"Come Back to Me"	Janet Jackson	
August 24	"If Wishes Came True"	Sweet Sensation	
August 31	"Release Me"	Wilson Phillips	
September 7	"Release Me"	Wilson Phillips	
September 14	"Release Me"	Wilson Phillips	
September 21	"Something Happened on the Way to Heaven"	Phil Collins	
September 28	"Something Happened on the Way to Heaven"	Phil Collins	
October 5	"Praying for Time"	George Michael	
October 12	"Praying for Time"	George Michael	
October 19	"Black Cat"	Janet Jackson	
October 26	"I Don't Have the Heart"	James Ingram	
November 2	"Ice Ice Baby"	Vanilla Ice	
November 9	"Ice Ice Baby"	Vanilla Ice	
November 16	"Love Takes Time"	Mariah Carey	
November 23	"Love Takes Time"	Mariah Carey	
November 30	"I'm Your Baby Tonight"	Whitney Houston	
December 7	"Because I Love You (The Postman Song)"	Stevie B	
December 14	"Because I Love You (The Postman Song)"	Stevie B	
December 21	"Justify My Love"	Madonna	

== 1991 ==
Issue Date	Song	Artist(s)	Reference
January 11	"Love Will Never Do (Without You)"	Janet Jackson	
January 18	"Love Will Never Do (Without You)"	Janet Jackson	
January 25	"Love Will Never Do (Without You)"	Janet Jackson	
February 1	"The First Time"	Surface	
February 8	"All the Man That I Need"	Whitney Houston	
February 15	"All the Man That I Need"	Whitney Houston	
February 22	"Someday"	Mariah Carey	
March 1	"Someday"	Mariah Carey	
March 8	"Someday"	Mariah Carey	
March 15	"Someday"	Mariah Carey	
March 22	"Coming Out of the Dark"	Gloria Estefan	
March 29	"I've Been Thinking About You"	Londonbeat	
April 5	"I've Been Thinking About You"	Londonbeat	
April 12	"You're in Love"	Wilson Phillips	
April 19	"Baby Baby"	Amy Grant	
April 26	"Baby Baby"	Amy Grant	
May 3	"Baby Baby"	Amy Grant	
May 10	"Touch Me (All Night Long)"	Cathy Dennis	
May 17	"I Don't Wanna Cry"	Mariah Carey	
May 24	"I Don't Wanna Cry"	Mariah Carey	
May 31	"I Don't Wanna Cry"	Mariah Carey	
June 7	"Rush Rush"	Paula Abdul	
June 14	"Rush Rush"	Paula Abdul	
June 21	"Rush Rush"	Paula Abdul	
June 28	"Rush Rush"	Paula Abdul	
July 5	"Rush Rush"	Paula Abdul	
July 12	"Unbelievable"	EMF	
July 19	"Right Here, Right Now"	Jesus Jones	
July 26	"(Everything I Do) I Do It for You"	Bryan Adams	
August 2	"(Everything I Do) I Do It for You"	Bryan Adams	
August 9	"(Everything I Do) I Do It for You"	Bryan Adams	
August 16	"(Everything I Do) I Do It for You"	Bryan Adams	
August 23	"(Everything I Do) I Do It for You"	Bryan Adams	
August 30	"(Everything I Do) I Do It for You"	Bryan Adams	
September 6	"The Promise of a New Day"	Paula Abdul	
September 13	"I Adore Mi Amor"	Color Me Badd	
September 20	"I Adore Mi Amor"	Color Me Badd	
September 27	"I Adore Mi Amor"	Color Me Badd	
October 4	"Emotions"	Mariah Carey	
October 11	"Emotions"	Mariah Carey	
October 18	"Emotions"	Mariah Carey	
October 25	"Romantic"	Karyn White	
November 1	"Romantic"	Karyn White	
November 8	"Cream"	Prince and The New Power Generation	
November 15	"When a Man Loves a Woman"	Michael Bolton	
November 22	"When a Man Loves a Woman"	Michael Bolton	
November 29	"When a Man Loves a Woman"	Michael Bolton	
December 6	"It's So Hard to Say Goodbye to Yesterday"	Boyz II Men	
December 13	"Black or White"	Michael Jackson	
December 20	"Black or White"	Michael Jackson	

== 1992 ==
Issue Date	Song	Artist(s)	Reference
January 10	"Can't Let Go"	Mariah Carey	
January 17	"Can't Let Go"	Mariah Carey	
January 24	"Can't Let Go"	Mariah Carey	
January 31	"Diamonds and Pearls"	Prince and The New Power Generation	
February 7	"Diamonds and Pearls"	Prince and The New Power Generation	
February 14	"I Love Your Smile"	Shanice	
February 21	"I Love Your Smile"	Shanice	
February 28	"Remember the Time"	Michael Jackson	
March 6	"Remember the Time"	Michael Jackson	
March 13	"Remember the Time"	Michael Jackson	
March 20	"Save the Best for Last"	Vanessa Williams	
March 27	"Save the Best for Last"	Vanessa Williams	
April 3	"Save the Best for Last"	Vanessa Williams	
April 10	"Save the Best for Last"	Vanessa Williams	
April 17	"Make It Happen"	Mariah Carey	
April 24	"Make It Happen"	Mariah Carey	
May 1	"My Lovin' (You're Never Gonna Get It)"	En Vogue	
May 8	"My Lovin' (You're Never Gonna Get It)"	En Vogue	
May 15	"My Lovin' (You're Never Gonna Get It)"	En Vogue	
May 22	"My Lovin' (You're Never Gonna Get It)"	En Vogue	
May 29	"Under the Bridge"	Red Hot Chili Peppers	
June 5	"Under the Bridge"	Red Hot Chili Peppers	
June 12	"I'll Be There"	Mariah Carey featuring Trey Lorenz	
June 19	"I'll Be There"	Mariah Carey featuring Trey Lorenz	
June 26	"I'll Be There"	Mariah Carey featuring Trey Lorenz	
July 3	"I'll Be There"	Mariah Carey featuring Trey Lorenz	
July 10	"I'll Be There"	Mariah Carey featuring Trey Lorenz	
July 17	"I'll Be There"	Mariah Carey featuring Trey Lorenz	
July 24	"This Used to Be My Playground"	Madonna	
July 31	"This Used to Be My Playground"	Madonna	
August 7	"This Used to Be My Playground"	Madonna	
August 14	"This Used to Be My Playground"	Madonna	
August 21	"End of the Road"	Boyz II Men	
August 28	"End of the Road"	Boyz II Men	
September 4	"End of the Road"	Boyz II Men	
September 11	"End of the Road"	Boyz II Men	
September 18	"End of the Road"	Boyz II Men	
September 25	"End of the Road"	Boyz II Men	
October 2	"Sometimes Love Just Ain't Enough"	Patty Smyth & Don Henley	
October 9	"Sometimes Love Just Ain't Enough"	Patty Smyth & Don Henley	
October 16	"Sometimes Love Just Ain't Enough"	Patty Smyth & Don Henley	
October 23	"I'd Die Without You"	P.M. Dawn	
October 30	"I'd Die Without You"	P.M. Dawn	
November 6	"I'd Die Without You"	P.M. Dawn	
November 13	"How Do You Talk to an Angel"	The Heights	
November 20	"How Do You Talk to an Angel"	The Heights	
November 27	"I Will Always Love You"	Whitney Houston	
December 4	"I Will Always Love You"	Whitney Houston	
December 11	"I Will Always Love You"	Whitney Houston	
December 18	"I Will Always Love You"	Whitney Houston	

== 1993 ==
Issue Date	Song	Artist(s)	Reference
January 8	"I Will Always Love You"	Whitney Houston	
January 15	"I Will Always Love You"	Whitney Houston	
January 22	"I Will Always Love You"	Whitney Houston	
January 29	"Deeper and Deeper"	Madonna	
February 5	"A Whole New World"	Peabo Bryson & Regina Belle	
February 12	"A Whole New World"	Peabo Bryson & Regina Belle	
February 19	"A Whole New World"	Peabo Bryson & Regina Belle	
February 26	"Ordinary World"	Duran Duran	
March 5	"Ordinary World"	Duran Duran	
March 12	"I'm Every Woman"	Whitney Houston	
March 19	"That's What Love Can Do"	Boy Krazy	
March 26	"That's What Love Can Do"	Boy Krazy	
April 2	"I Have Nothing"	Whitney Houston	
April 9	"I Have Nothing"	Whitney Houston	
April 16	"I Have Nothing"	Whitney Houston	
April 23	"I Have Nothing"	Whitney Houston	
April 30	"Love Is"	Vanessa Williams & Brian McKnight	
May 7	"Looking Through Patient Eyes"	P.M. Dawn	
May 14	"Looking Through Patient Eyes"	P.M. Dawn	
May 21	"That's the Way Love Goes"	Janet Jackson	
May 28	"That's the Way Love Goes"	Janet Jackson	
June 4	"That's the Way Love Goes"	Janet Jackson	
June 11	"That's the Way Love Goes"	Janet Jackson	
June 18	"That's the Way Love Goes"	Janet Jackson	
June 25	"That's the Way Love Goes"	Janet Jackson	
July 2	"Weak"	SWV	
July 9	"Weak"	SWV	
July 16	"Weak"	SWV	
July 23	"Weak"	SWV	
July 30	"(I Can't Help) Falling in Love with You"	UB40	
August 6	"(I Can't Help) Falling in Love with You"	UB40	
August 13	"(I Can't Help) Falling in Love with You"	UB40	
August 20	"Dreamlover"	Mariah Carey	
August 27	"Dreamlover"	Mariah Carey	
September 3	"Dreamlover"	Mariah Carey	
September 10	"Dreamlover"	Mariah Carey	
September 17	"Dreamlover"	Mariah Carey	
September 24	"Dreamlover"	Mariah Carey	
October 1	"Dreamlover"	Mariah Carey	
October 8	"Dreamlover"	Mariah Carey	
October 15	"Dreamlover"	Mariah Carey	
October 22	"Again"	Janet Jackson	
October 29	"Again"	Janet Jackson	
November 5	"Again"	Janet Jackson	
November 12	"Again"	Janet Jackson	
November 19	"Again"	Janet Jackson	
November 26	"Hero"	Mariah Carey	
December 3	"Hero"	Mariah Carey	
December 10	"Hero"	Mariah Carey	
December 17	"Hero"	Mariah Carey	

== 1994 ==
Issue Date	Song	Artist(s)	Reference
January 7	"Hero"	Mariah Carey	
January 14	"All for Love"	Bryan Adams, Rod Stewart & Sting	
January 21	"All for Love"	Bryan Adams, Rod Stewart & Sting	
January 28	"All for Love"	Bryan Adams, Rod Stewart & Sting	
February 4	"All for Love"	Bryan Adams, Rod Stewart & Sting	
February 11	"The Sign"	Ace of Base	
February 18	"The Sign"	Ace of Base	
February 25	"The Sign"	Ace of Base	
March 4	"The Sign"	Ace of Base	
March 11	"The Sign"	Ace of Base	
March 18	"The Sign"	Ace of Base	
March 25	"The Sign"	Ace of Base	
April 1	"The Sign"	Ace of Base	
April 8	"The Most Beautiful Girl in the World"	Prince	
April 15	"The Most Beautiful Girl in the World"	Prince	
April 22	"The Sign"	Ace of Base	
April 29	"Mr. Jones"	Counting Crows	
May 6	"Mr. Jones"	Counting Crows	
May 13	"Mr. Jones"	Counting Crows	
May 20	"I'll Remember"	Madonna	
May 27	"I'll Remember"	Madonna	
June 3	"I'll Remember"	Madonna	
June 10	"I'll Remember"	Madonna	
June 17	"I Swear"	All-4-One	
June 24	"I Swear"	All-4-One	
July 1	"Don't Turn Around"	Ace of Base	
July 8	"Don't Turn Around"	Ace of Base	
July 15	"Don't Turn Around"	Ace of Base	
July 22	"Don't Turn Around"	Ace of Base	
July 29	"Don't Turn Around"	Ace of Base	
August 5	"Don't Turn Around"	Ace of Base	
August 12	"Stay (I Missed You)"	Lisa Loeb & Nine Stories	
August 19	"Stay (I Missed You)"	Lisa Loeb & Nine Stories	
August 26	"Stay (I Missed You)"	Lisa Loeb & Nine Stories	
September 2	"Stay (I Missed You)"	Lisa Loeb & Nine Stories	
September 9	"I'll Make Love to You"	Boyz II Men	
September 16	"I'll Make Love to You"	Boyz II Men	
September 23	"I'll Make Love to You"	Boyz II Men	
September 30	"I'll Make Love to You"	Boyz II Men	
October 7	"All I Wanna Do"	Sheryl Crow	
October 14	"All I Wanna Do"	Sheryl Crow	
October 21	"All I Wanna Do"	Sheryl Crow	
October 28	"All I Wanna Do"	Sheryl Crow	
November 4	"All I Wanna Do"	Sheryl Crow	
November 11	"All I Wanna Do"	Sheryl Crow	
November 18	"Another Night"	Real McCoy	
November 25	"Another Night"	Real McCoy	
December 2	"Another Night"	Real McCoy	
December 9	"Another Night"	Real McCoy	
December 16	"On Bended Knee"	Boyz II Men	

== 1995 ==
Issue Date	Song	Artist(s)	Reference
January 6	"On Bended Knee"	Boyz II Men	
January 13	"On Bended Knee"	Boyz II Men	
January 20	"On Bended Knee"	Boyz II Men	
January 27	"On Bended Knee"	Boyz II Men	
February 3	"On Bended Knee"	Boyz II Men	
February 10	"Take a Bow"	Madonna	
February 17	"Take a Bow"	Madonna	
February 24	"Take a Bow"	Madonna	
March 3	"Take a Bow"	Madonna	
March 10	"Take a Bow"	Madonna	
March 17	"I Know"	Dionne Farris	
March 24	"I Know"	Dionne Farris	
March 31	"I Know"	Dionne Farris	
April 7	"I Know"	Dionne Farris	
April 14	"I Know"	Dionne Farris	
April 21	"I Know"	Dionne Farris	
April 28	"I Know"	Dionne Farris	
May 5	"I Know"	Dionne Farris	
May 12	"I Know"	Dionne Farris	
May 19	"I Believe"	Blessid Union of Souls	
May 26	"I Believe"	Blessid Union of Souls	
June 2	"Let Her Cry"	Hootie & the Blowfish	
June 9	"I'll Be There for You"	The Rembrandts	
June 16	"I'll Be There for You"	The Rembrandts	
June 23	"I'll Be There for You"	The Rembrandts	
June 30	"I'll Be There for You"	The Rembrandts	
July 7	"I'll Be There for You"	The Rembrandts	
July 14	"I'll Be There for You"	The Rembrandts	
July 21	"I'll Be There for You"	The Rembrandts	
July 28	"I'll Be There for You"	The Rembrandts	
August 4	"Kiss from a Rose"	Seal	
August 11	"Kiss from a Rose"	Seal	
August 18	"Kiss from a Rose"	Seal	
August 25	"Kiss from a Rose"	Seal	
September 1	"Kiss from a Rose"	Seal	
September 8	"Kiss from a Rose"	Seal	
September 15	"Kiss from a Rose"	Seal	
September 22	"Kiss from a Rose"	Seal	
September 29	"Only Wanna Be with You"	Hootie & the Blowfish	
October 6	"Only Wanna Be with You"	Hootie & the Blowfish	
October 13	"Only Wanna Be with You"	Hootie & the Blowfish	
October 20	"Fantasy"	Mariah Carey	
October 27	"Fantasy"	Mariah Carey	
November 3	"Fantasy"	Mariah Carey	
November 10	"Fantasy"	Mariah Carey	
November 17	"Fantasy"	Mariah Carey	
November 24	"Fantasy"	Mariah Carey	
December 1	"Name"	Goo Goo Dolls	
December 8	"One Sweet Day"	Mariah Carey & Boyz II Men	
December 15	"One Sweet Day"	Mariah Carey & Boyz II Men	
December 22	"One Sweet Day"	Mariah Carey & Boyz II Men	

== 1996 ==
Issue Date	Song	Artist(s)	Reference
January 12	"One Sweet Day"	Mariah Carey & Boyz II Men	
January 19	"One Sweet Day"	Mariah Carey & Boyz II Men	
January 26	"One Sweet Day"	Mariah Carey & Boyz II Men	
February 2	"One Sweet Day"	Mariah Carey & Boyz II Men	
February 9	"One Sweet Day"	Mariah Carey & Boyz II Men	
February 16	"Missing"	Everything but the Girl	
February 23	"Missing"	Everything but the Girl	
March 1	"Missing"	Everything but the Girl	
March 8	"Missing"	Everything but the Girl	
March 15	"Nobody Knows"	Tony Rich Project	
March 22	"Nobody Knows"	Tony Rich Project	
March 29	"Ironic"	Alanis Morissette	
April 5	"Ironic"	Alanis Morissette	
April 12	"Ironic"	Alanis Morissette	
April 19	"Ironic"	Alanis Morissette	
April 26	"Because You Loved Me"	Celine Dion	
May 3	"Because You Loved Me"	Celine Dion	
May 10	"Because You Loved Me"	Celine Dion	
May 17	"Because You Loved Me"	Celine Dion	
May 24	"Because You Loved Me"	Celine Dion	
May 31	"Because You Loved Me"	Celine Dion	
June 7	"Because You Loved Me"	Celine Dion	
June 14	"Give Me One Reason"	Tracy Chapman	
June 21	"Give Me One Reason"	Tracy Chapman	
June 28	"Killing Me Softly"	Fugees	
July 5	"You Learn"	Alanis Morissette	
July 12	"You Learn"	Alanis Morissette	
July 19	"You Learn"	Alanis Morissette	
July 26	"You Learn"	Alanis Morissette	
August 2	"You Learn"	Alanis Morissette	
August 9	"You Learn"	Alanis Morissette	
August 16	"I Love You Always Forever"	Donna Lewis	
August 23	"I Love You Always Forever"	Donna Lewis	
August 30	"I Love You Always Forever"	Donna Lewis	
September 6	"I Love You Always Forever"	Donna Lewis	
September 13	"I Love You Always Forever"	Donna Lewis	
September 20	"I Love You Always Forever"	Donna Lewis	
September 27	"I Love You Always Forever"	Donna Lewis	
October 4	"I Love You Always Forever"	Donna Lewis	
October 11	"I Love You Always Forever"	Donna Lewis	
October 18	"I Love You Always Forever"	Donna Lewis	
October 25	"I Love You Always Forever"	Donna Lewis	
November 1	"I Love You Always Forever"	Donna Lewis	
November 8	"Head over Feet"	Alanis Morissette	
November 15	"Head over Feet"	Alanis Morissette	
November 22	"Head over Feet"	Alanis Morissette	
November 29	"Head over Feet"	Alanis Morissette	
December 6	"Don't Speak"	No Doubt	
December 13	"Don't Speak"	No Doubt	
December 20	"Don't Speak"	No Doubt	

== 1997 ==
Issue Date	Song	Artist(s)	Reference
January 10	"Don't Speak"	No Doubt	
January 17	"Don't Speak"	No Doubt	
January 24	"Don't Speak"	No Doubt	
January 31	"Don't Speak"	No Doubt	
February 7	"Don't Speak"	No Doubt	
February 14	"Don't Speak"	No Doubt	
February 21	"Lovefool"	The Cardigans	
February 28	"Lovefool"	The Cardigans	
March 7	"Lovefool"	The Cardigans	
March 14	"Lovefool"	The Cardigans	
March 21	"Lovefool"	The Cardigans	
March 28	"Lovefool"	The Cardigans	
April 4	"You Were Meant for Me"	Jewel	
April 11	"You Were Meant for Me"	Jewel	
April 18	"You Were Meant for Me"	Jewel	
April 25	"You Were Meant for Me"	Jewel	
May 2	"You Were Meant for Me"	Jewel	
May 9	"I Want You"	Savage Garden	
May 16	"MMMBop"	Hanson	
May 23	"MMMBop"	Hanson	
May 30	"MMMBop"	Hanson	
June 6	"MMMBop"	Hanson	
June 13	"MMMBop"	Hanson	
June 20	"MMMBop"	Hanson	
June 27	"MMMBop"	Hanson	
July 4	"MMMBop"	Hanson	
July 11	"MMMBop"	Hanson	
July 18	"Bitch"	Meredith Brooks	
July 25	"Bitch"	Meredith Brooks	
August 1	"Bitch"	Meredith Brooks	
August 8	"Semi-Charmed Life"	Third Eye Blind	
August 15	"Semi-Charmed Life"	Third Eye Blind	
August 22	"Semi-Charmed Life"	Third Eye Blind	
August 29	"Semi-Charmed Life"	Third Eye Blind	
September 5	"Semi-Charmed Life"	Third Eye Blind	
September 12	"Semi-Charmed Life"	Third Eye Blind	
September 19	"Foolish Games"	Jewel	
September 26	"Foolish Games"	Jewel	
October 3	"Foolish Games"	Jewel	
October 10	"Foolish Games"	Jewel	
October 17	"Fly"	Sugar Ray	
October 24	"Fly"	Sugar Ray	
October 31	"Fly"	Sugar Ray	
November 7	"Fly"	Sugar Ray	
November 14	"Fly"	Sugar Ray	
November 21	"Fly"	Sugar Ray	
November 28	"Tubthumping"	Chumbawamba	
December 5	"Tubthumping"	Chumbawamba	
December 12	"Tubthumping"	Chumbawamba	
December 19	"Tubthumping"	Chumbawamba	

== 1998 ==
Issue Date	Song	Artist(s)	Reference
January 9	"Tubthumping"	Chumbawamba	
January 16	"Tubthumping"	Chumbawamba	
January 23	"Truly Madly Deeply"	Savage Garden	
January 30	"Truly Madly Deeply"	Savage Garden	
February 6	"My Heart Will Go On"	Celine Dion	
February 13	"My Heart Will Go On"	Celine Dion	
February 20	"My Heart Will Go On"	Celine Dion	
February 27	"My Heart Will Go On"	Celine Dion	
March 6	"My Heart Will Go On"	Celine Dion	
March 13	"My Heart Will Go On"	Celine Dion	
March 20	"My Heart Will Go On"	Celine Dion	
March 27	"My Heart Will Go On"	Celine Dion	
April 3	"My Heart Will Go On"	Celine Dion	
April 10	"Truly Madly Deeply"	Savage Garden	
April 17	"Torn"	Natalie Imbruglia	
April 24	"Torn"	Natalie Imbruglia	
May 1	"Torn"	Natalie Imbruglia	
May 8	"Torn"	Natalie Imbruglia	
May 15	"Torn"	Natalie Imbruglia	
May 22	"Torn"	Natalie Imbruglia	
May 29	"Torn"	Natalie Imbruglia	
June 5	"Torn"	Natalie Imbruglia	
June 12	"Torn"	Natalie Imbruglia	
June 19	"Torn"	Natalie Imbruglia	
June 26	"Torn"	Natalie Imbruglia	
July 3	"Uninvited"	Alanis Morissette	
July 10	"Uninvited"	Alanis Morissette	
July 17	"Iris"	Goo Goo Dolls	
July 24	"Iris"	Goo Goo Dolls	
July 31	"Iris"	Goo Goo Dolls	
August 7	"Iris"	Goo Goo Dolls	
August 14	"I Don't Want to Miss a Thing"	Aerosmith	
August 21	"I Don't Want to Miss a Thing"	Aerosmith	
August 28	"I Don't Want to Miss a Thing"	Aerosmith	
September 4	"I Don't Want to Miss a Thing"	Aerosmith	
September 11	"I Don't Want to Miss a Thing"	Aerosmith	
September 18	"I Don't Want to Miss a Thing"	Aerosmith	
September 25	"I Don't Want to Miss a Thing"	Aerosmith	
October 2	"I Don't Want to Miss a Thing"	Aerosmith	
October 9	"One Week"	Barenaked Ladies	
October 16	"One Week"	Barenaked Ladies	
October 23	"One Week"	Barenaked Ladies	
October 30	"One Week"	Barenaked Ladies	
November 6	"One Week"	Barenaked Ladies	
November 13	"One Week"	Barenaked Ladies	
November 20	"Thank U"	Alanis Morissette	
November 27	"Jumper"	Third Eye Blind	
December 4	"Lullaby"	Shawn Mullins	
December 11	"Lullaby"	Shawn Mullins	
December 18	"Lullaby"	Shawn Mullins	

== 1999 ==
Issue Date	Song	Artist(s)	Reference
January 8	"Lullaby"	Shawn Mullins	
January 15	"Lullaby"	Shawn Mullins	
January 22	"Save Tonight"	Eagle-Eye Cherry	
January 29	"Slide"	Goo Goo Dolls	
February 5	"Slide"	Goo Goo Dolls	
February 12	"...Baby One More Time"	Britney Spears	
February 19	"...Baby One More Time"	Britney Spears	
February 26	"...Baby One More Time"	Britney Spears	
March 5	"...Baby One More Time"	Britney Spears	
March 12	"...Baby One More Time"	Britney Spears	
March 19	"Every Morning"	Sugar Ray	
March 26	"Every Morning"	Sugar Ray	
April 2	"Every Morning"	Sugar Ray	
April 9	"Every Morning"	Sugar Ray	
April 16	"Every Morning"	Sugar Ray	
April 23	"Every Morning"	Sugar Ray	
April 30	"Every Morning"	Sugar Ray	
May 7	"Kiss Me"	Sixpence None the Richer	
May 14	"Kiss Me"	Sixpence None the Richer	
May 21	"Livin' la Vida Loca"	Ricky Martin	
May 28	"Livin' la Vida Loca"	Ricky Martin	
June 4	"Livin' la Vida Loca"	Ricky Martin	
June 11	"Livin' la Vida Loca"	Ricky Martin	
June 18	"Livin' la Vida Loca"	Ricky Martin	
June 25	"Livin' la Vida Loca"	Ricky Martin	
July 2	"Livin' la Vida Loca"	Ricky Martin	
July 9	"I Want It That Way"	Backstreet Boys	
July 16	"I Want It That Way"	Backstreet Boys	
July 23	"I Want It That Way"	Backstreet Boys	
July 30	"All Star"	Smash Mouth	
August 6	"All Star"	Smash Mouth	
August 13	"All Star"	Smash Mouth	
August 20	"All Star"	Smash Mouth	
August 27	"All Star"	Smash Mouth	
September 3	"Genie in a Bottle"	Christina Aguilera	
September 10	"Genie in a Bottle"	Christina Aguilera	
September 17	"Genie in a Bottle"	Christina Aguilera	
September 24	"Genie in a Bottle"	Christina Aguilera	
October 1	"Mambo No. 5 (A Little Bit of...)"	Lou Bega	
October 8	"Mambo No. 5 (A Little Bit of...)"	Lou Bega	
October 15	"Mambo No. 5 (A Little Bit of...)"	Lou Bega	
October 22	"Mambo No. 5 (A Little Bit of...)"	Lou Bega	
October 29	"Mambo No. 5 (A Little Bit of...)"	Lou Bega	
November 5	"Smooth"	Santana featuring Rob Thomas	
November 12	"Smooth"	Santana featuring Rob Thomas	
November 19	"Smooth"	Santana featuring Rob Thomas	
November 26	"Smooth"	Santana featuring Rob Thomas	
December 3	"Smooth"	Santana featuring Rob Thomas	
December 10	"Smooth"	Santana featuring Rob Thomas	
December 17	"Smooth"	Santana featuring Rob Thomas	

== See also ==
- List of record charts
