= Blinded (song) =

Single by Third Eye Blind

from the album Out of the Vein
- Released: March 25, 2003
- Studio: Mourningwood Studio and Skywalker Sound (San Francisco)
- Genre: Pop rock
- Length: 4:26 (album version); 3:55 (single version)
- Label: Elektra
- Songwriters: Stephan Jenkins; Arion Salazar; Tony Fredianelli
- Producer: Stephan Jenkins

Third Eye Blind singles chronology
"Deep Inside of You" (2000)	"Blinded" (2003)	"Crystal Baller" (2003)

Music video
- "Blinded" on YouTube

"Blinded" (also known as "Blinded (When I See You)") is a song by American rock band Third Eye Blind. It was released in March 2003 as the lead single from their 2003 album, Out of the Vein. It was written by Stephan Jenkins, Arion Salazar, and Tony Fredianelli. The song received positive reviews from music critics and peaked at number 34 on the Billboard Pop Songs chart.

== Background ==
"Blinded" was written by Stephan Jenkins, Arion Salazar, and Tony Fredianelli and was produced by Jenkins.

The protagonist of the song is a man who goes to his ex-lover's apartment and spies on her through the bathroom door, illustrated in lyrics such as "I see you fogging up the mirror / Vapor round your body glistens from the shower."

According to Entertainment Weekly's Tom Sinclair, the song seems to reference The Who's "Pinball Wizard".

== Release ==
"Blinded"

"Blinded" was released as a single in April 2003. It was the second track on Third Eye Blind's 2003 album, Out of the Vein, which was released the following month.

The song also appeared on Third Eye Blind's 2006 compilation album, A Collection.

== Critical reception ==
"Blinded" received positive critical reviews. Billboard's Chuck Taylor wrote that the song was "a jangly, pop-rooted rocker that reflects the signature style of the band: lyric-loaded, a big chorus, hearty, organic instrumentation, and more than a smattering of sexual innuendo. Adult top 40 and modern rock should take this baby in and give it a happy home." Billboard's Larry Flick thought that the song would "easily stand the test of time." While comparing Out of the Vein to Third Eye Blind's previous work, the Record-Journal's Alan Sculley wrote, "Frisky songs like 'Blinded (When I See You)' and 'Crystal Baller' sit comfortably alongside past hits like 'Semi-Charmed Life' and 'Never Let You Go.'"

== Chart performance ==
"Blinded" was the first single released off of Out of the Vein. It spent 15 weeks on the Billboard Adult Pop Songs chart and peaked at number 17 on July 5, 2003. It also peaked at number 35 on the Billboard Alternative Songs chart and at number 34 on the Billboard Pop Songs chart. It was the only single from Out of the Vein to appear on the charts.

== Music video ==
The song's music video was directed by Stephan Jenkins and features the band members fooling around and performing onstage.

== Credits and personnel ==
Credits and personnel are adapted from the "Blinded (When I See You)" CD single liner notes.

- Stephan Jenkins – vocals, writer, producer
- Arion Salazar – writer, producer
- Tony Fredianelli – writer
- Jason Carmer – producer, engineering
- Sean Beresford – engineering
- Sean Coleman – assistant engineer
- Tom Lord-Alge – mixing at Southbeach Studio (Miami)
- Emily Lazar – mastering at The Lodge (New York)

== Charts ==
Chart (2003)	Peak position
US Bubbling Under Hot 100 (Billboard)	16
US Adult Pop Airplay (Billboard)	17
US Alternative Airplay (Billboard)	35
US Pop Airplay (Billboard)	34

== Release history ==
Release history and formats for "Blinded"
Region	Date	Formats(s)	Label(s)	Ref(s).
United States	March 25, 2003	Modern rock radio	Elektra	
United States	April 14, 2003	Contemporary hit radio	Elektra; EEG	
