= Art of Revenge =

- Directed by: Simon Gornick
- Written by: Simon Gornick
- Produced by: Stephanie Kime; Simon Gornick; Nancy Babka; Mark Binder; Linda Carolei
- Starring: Stephan Jenkins; Joyce Hyser
- Cinematography: Patrice Lucien Cochet
- Edited by: Larry Madaras; Melissa Remenarich-Aperlo
- Music by: Viktor Phoenix; Rossano Totino
- Production company: Broad Beach Productions
- Distributed by: Trans World Associates (Japan); Trinity Home Entertainment (International)
- Release date: February 25, 2003
- Running time: 88 minutes
- Country: United States

Art of Revenge is a 2003 drama thriller film written and directed by Simon Gormick. The film was released straight to video, starring Joyce Hyser and Stephan Jenkins of Third Eye Blind.

== Plot ==
When Matthew Kane (Stephan Jenkins) becomes a successful architect, he leaves his wife of seven years, Lara (Joyce Hyser), to nurture his newfound taste for younger and prettier women. Bent on revenge, Lara hires a beautiful con artist named Tuesday (Nichole Hiltz) to seduce and emotionally destroy her ex-husband. When the two women become more involved with Matt as well as each other, a story of loyalty, vengeance, and betrayal begins to unfold as the situation becomes more dangerous than expected for all parties involved.

== Cast ==
- Stephan Jenkins as Matthew Kane
- Joyce Hyser as Lara Kane
- Nicole Hiltz as Tuesday Arcatur
- Tembi Locke as Isabel "Izzy" Bloom
- David DeLuise as Benjamin Bloom
- Tony Denison as John Ravich

== Reception ==
Writing for The A.V. Club, Nathan Rabin referred to the film as "hilariously awful," specifically criticizing Jenkins's "inexplicably effeminate performance that throws the film off balance."
