= A Collection (Third Eye Blind album) =

Greatest hits album by Third Eye Blind
- Released: July 18, 2006
- Recorded: 1997–2003, various locations
- Genre: Alternative rock
- Length: 79:11
- Label: Rhino/WEA
- Producers: Stephan Jenkins; Eric Valentine; Arion Salazar; Third Eye Blind

Third Eye Blind chronology
Out of the Vein (2003)	A Collection (2006)	Red Star (2008)

A Collection is a greatest hits album by Third Eye Blind, released July 18, 2006. The album contains all of their singles (with the exception of "Anything"), a handful of fan and band favorites, as well as three unreleased-via-LP songs: "Tattoo of the Sun", "My Time in Exile" and "Slow Motion" (with lyrics). The package also includes liner notes from renowned rock writer James Hunter and track-by-track commentary from Stephan Jenkins.

== Critical reception ==
Professional ratings
Review scores
Source	Rating
Allmusic	4/5 stars

Stephen Thomas Erlewine of AllMusic was critical of the length of the album, commenting that the album captures Third Eye Blind's "early way with a hook as skillfully as their descent into unbearable pomposity".

== Commercial performance ==
A Collection peaked at #103 on the Billboard 200, staying on the chart for three weeks.

== Track listing ==
No.	Title	Writer(s)	Producer(s)	Length
1.	"Semi-Charmed Life" (From Third Eye Blind, 1997)	Stephan Jenkins	Eric Valentine	4:28
2.	"Losing a Whole Year" (From Third Eye Blind)	Jenkins; Kevin Cadogan	Jenkins; Valentine	3:20
3.	"How's It Going to Be" (From Third Eye Blind)	Jenkins; Cadogan	Jenkins; Valentine; Ren Klyce	4:12
4.	"Jumper" (From Third Eye Blind)	Jenkins	Jenkins; Valentine	4:32
5.	"Graduate" (From Third Eye Blind)	Jenkins; Cadogan	Jenkins; Valentine	3:11
6.	"Never Let You Go" (From Blue, 1999)	Jenkins	Jenkins; The Mud Sisters; Arion Salazar; Third Eye Blind	3:57
7.	"Deep Inside of You" (From Blue)	Jenkins	Jenkins; The Mud Sisters; Salazar; Third Eye Blind	4:12
8.	"10 Days Late" (From Blue)	Jenkins; Arion Salazar	Jenkins; Salazar	3:06
9.	"Blinded" (From Out of the Vein, 2003)	Jenkins; Salazar; Tony Fredianelli	Jenkins	4:23
10.	"Crystal Baller" (From Out of the Vein)	Jenkins	Jenkins; Salazar; Jason Carmer	4:15
11.	"Forget Myself" (From Out of the Vein)	Jenkins; Salazar	Jenkins	4:13
12.	"Can't Get Away" (From Out of the Vein)	Jenkins; Salazar	Jenkins	3:46
13.	"Motorcycle Drive By" (From Third Eye Blind)	Jenkins	Jenkins; Valentine	4:24
14.	"My Time in Exile" (From Out of the Vein (Japanese Issue))	Jenkins; Salazar	Jenkins	3:17
15.	"Palm Reader" (From Out of the Vein)	Jenkins; Fredianelli	Jenkins	4:55
16.	"Tattoo of the Sun" (B-side of "Semi-Charmed Life")	Jenkins; Salazar; Cadogan	Jenkins; Valentine	4:16
17.	"Wounded" (From Blue)	Jenkins; Cadogan	Jenkins	4:52
18.	"God of Wine" (From Third Eye Blind)	Jenkins; Cadogan	Jenkins; Valentine	5:19
19.	"Slow Motion" (From Blue)	Jenkins; Cadogan	Jenkins; David Gleeson; Klyce	4:33
Total length:				79:11

== Rejected options ==
An acoustic version of "Anything" (the only single that did not make the cut) was replaced by "Can't Get Away", likely due to its short-length and to even the number of songs from each album. Remixes of "Losing a Whole Year" and "Graduate" and a 1995 demo of "Semi-Charmed Life" were dropped in favor of the original studio recordings, likely done in order to appeal to a traditional audience. The track list was also in a different order:

1. "Semi-Charmed Life (1995 Demo)"
2. "Losing A Whole Year (Remix - Strings Up)"
3. "How's It Going To Be"
4. "Jumper"
5. "Graduate (Remix)"
6. "Tattoo Of The Sun"
7. "Never Let You Go"
8. "Deep Inside Of You"
9. "Anything (Acoustic)"
10. "10 Days Late"
11. "Blinded"
12. "Crystal Baller"
13. "My Time In Exile"
14. "God Of Wine"
15. "Motorcycle Drive By"
16. "Forget Myself"
17. "Wounded"
18. "Palm Reader"
19. "Slow Motion (With Lyrics)"
