= Blue (Third Eye Blind album) =

Studio album by Third Eye Blind
- Released: November 23, 1999
- Recorded: 1999
- Genres: Alternative rock; post-grunge
- Length: 69:03
- Label: Elektra
- Producers: Stephan Jenkins, Arion Salazar, and Third Eye Blind

Third Eye Blind chronology
Third Eye Blind (1997)	Blue (1999)	Out of the Vein (2003)

Singles from Blue
- 1. "Anything" Released: November 2, 1999; 2. "Never Let You Go" Released: January 4, 2000; 3. "10 Days Late" Released: April 11, 2000; 4. "Deep Inside of You" Released: July 10, 2000

Blue is the second studio album by American rock band Third Eye Blind, released on November 23, 1999. The album's creation was difficult, mainly due to power struggles and arguments between frontman Stephan Jenkins and lead guitarist Kevin Cadogan, leading to a quick but isolated recording experience between members. The album was generally well received by critics, and was certified platinum by the RIAA, but performed below the band's prior album, the multi-platinum Third Eye Blind. While managing to stay together for the creation of the album, shortly after its release, the band fired Cadogan, touring in support of the album with replacement guitarist Tony Fredianelli.

== Background ==
=== Writing and recording ===
The band enjoyed extensive success in 1997 with their first album, Third Eye Blind, which eventually went platinum six times. The band maintained popularity into 1998 through extensive touring and a number of singles that performed well in the charts, including "Semi-Charmed Life", "How's It Going to Be", "Graduate", "Losing a Whole Year", and "Jumper", but by the end of the year, the band looked to start working on new material. Dedicated work on the album began right away in January 1999.

In promoting the album, frontman and lead vocalist Stephan Jenkins recounted a pleasant experience in recording the album, referring to it as "too much fun and feeling like...a complete recording group for the first time...We had these jam sessions that were fun". He also commented that it had been more collaborative than their prior album; bassist Arion Salazar became more involved in the writing and production, while drummer Brad Hargreaves was involved in the creative process for the first time, as he had joined the band late into their sessions for the first album. However, in retrospect, Jenkins painted a much more grim picture, citing time constraints, label pressure from Elektra Records, and isolation between members, stating:

"We did the last album in six months, we just whipped it out, and there's some things on that album, on the second album, that I'm so proud of...but the second album suffered from a kind of coldness almost. That's done in part because we were never in the studio at the same time, never rehearsed the songs together, never played them together. I did my best to, to produce that record and it was very hard to do. Then we succumbed to the time pressures from Elektra to get the album out in six months which we did."

A major issue of the recording sessions was internal strife between band members, namely between Jenkins and lead guitarist and co-founding member Kevin Cadogan. The two actively fought for ownership of the band; Cadogan, under the impression that the band was made as an equal partnership, was outraged to find that Jenkins had made legal changes to make Jenkins the sole owner of the band. Cadogan was further frustrated by Salazar's and Hargreaves' lack of understanding and indifference to the arrangement. The album was almost not made at all, as the band manager informed Cadogan that Jenkins was attempting to remove Cadogan from the band prior to even starting work on the album. Cadogan did everything he could to stay in the band, including trying to push issues aside in order to just work on the album, having the band and sound engineer over to his home in order to record rough album ideas for two weeks. The sessions worked, but were very difficult, and ended up being the only period where the band worked together with one another. The rest of the album was recorded in solitude, with each member coming into the studio to record his parts of the album alone. The recording process spread itself across multiple other studios over time, one of which being one of the studios where Fleetwood Mac's Rumours had been recorded.

=== Song selection ===
The tension and isolation in the recording process led to complications in the song selection, which would, in turn create further tensions within the band. Firstly was the song "Slow Motion", a controversial ballad written by Jenkins about a student shooting a teacher's son. While Jenkins insisted that the song was satirical parody, and actually anti-violence, Elektra disapproved of the track being on the album, feeling it could cause controversy due to the proximity of the Columbine High School massacre, which had just happened in April of that year. The band and the label fought over the song's inclusion for four months, with the label proposing a compromise that would allow only the instrumental to be on the album, and in return, the label would finance an EP to be released after the album, where the band could release the song in its entirety and have complete creative freedom, without restriction. Cadogan, already unhappy with his lack of ownership over the band, was the sole member of the band to object to the deal, knowing he would not have any control over the deal's terms of a cash advance and imprint label creation for the EP.

With the members of the band not working together at the same time in the studio, the band's manager Eric Godtland set up a voting system for each member of the band to vote for the rest of the songs they wanted included on the album. A list of twenty songs were recorded during Blue's sessions, with Godtland instructing each member of the band to vote for their top fifteen. In addition to the twelve tracks that made the final track list of Blue (The thirteenth track, "Slow Motion" was not voted upon, as they had already come to a conclusion on what to do with the song.), were an additional eight songs, "Walk with the Devil", "Alright Caroline", "Lipstick", "Light That Hits the Room/Separation", "Sorry", "Gorgeous", "No One Home", and "Pack a Halo". Adding to the tension between Cadogan and the rest of the band was that many of the songs Cadogan had written, such as "Light That Hits the Room", received no votes for inclusion beside his own, and "Gorgeous" received only the support of himself and Hargreaves, ultimately leading to the songs being left off the album. Conversely, Cadogan was the sole objector to the tracks "Never Let You Go" and "Deep Inside of You", which were not only included on the album, but eventually made singles. Elektra spokesman Joel Amsterdam revealed that "Horror Show", a track the band had recorded and released originally on the "How's It Going to Be" single and for the Varsity Blues soundtrack, was also in contention for the album, but ultimately left off.

== Sound, composition, and themes ==
Not wanting to be pigeonholed into the pop rock genre after the success of "Semi-Charmed Life" from their debut, the band aimed to have a more experimental and harder-edged rock sound on their second album. Cadogan personally aimed for the album's sound to reflect all of the music he had encountered, due to it always being planned as one of the last albums released in the 20th century. As such, the individual songs spanned many genre and lyrical themes. The album's opening track and first single, "Anything", was described as pop punk. "Wounded" was described by Jenkins as "a chronicle of a friend's sexual assault", while "10 Days Late" was described as an "ambiguous [song] about abortion". However, when Jenkins was interviewed by Billboard, he claimed the song was about a friend of his who had gotten his girlfriend pregnant at a young age; Jenkins was the baby's godfather. "Slow Motion" was Jenkins' satirical commentary on how the media and Hollywood glorifies violence. While the lyrics were seen as controversial due to the album's release close to the Columbine High School massacre, they were not about the incident, and were actually written years prior, in 1995, though the label still requested their removal for the final release of the album.

== Release and aftermath ==
The album debuted at number 40 on the US Billboard 200, selling about 75,000 copies in its first week of release. Blue was certified platinum by the RIAA by April 2000, and had sold over 1.25 million copies in the U.S. as of May 2003. Two variants of the album were released: a first pressing with "Slow Motion" with a chorus as track 11, and later pressings with it as an instrumental at the very end of the album. Four singles were released to pop and rock radio: "Anything", "Never Let You Go", "10 Days Late", and "Deep Inside of You". The band also toured vigorously in support of the album, including their "Dragons and Astronauts" tour.

Just after the touring in support of Blue began, on January 25, 2000, Cadogan was fired from the band. Tony Fredianelli, who had some limited experience with the band previously, joined the band shortly thereafter, filling in for the rest of the touring cycle. Cadogan subsequently sued Third Eye Blind for breach of contract, with a settlement of an undisclosed amount permanently ending the relationship. Third Eye Blind would go on to put out two more albums with Fredianelli, albeit with very long delays, Out of the Vein (2003) and Ursa Major (2009), until similar power struggles between Fredianelli and Jenkins led to similar firings and lawsuits between the two in 2010. Cadogan mostly kept to low-profile projects, largely three solo albums: 12 Nights in Studio A (2002), Wunderfoot (2003), and Thousand Yard Stare (2006). Notably, a number of versions of his songs written, but ultimately rejected for, Blue ended up on the album Wunderfoot, including "Lipstick", "Pack a Halo" (reworked into "Palpatations"), and "Walk With the Devil" (reworked into "Waiting for Me").

The contentious full lyric version of "Slow Motion" never appeared on a later EP, as the Black EP, later re-titled Symphony of Decay, was never released, but the song was eventually released in 2006 on the greatest hits album A Collection. Despite the difficult recording sessions and strife among members, in a 2015 Vice retrospective, Jenkins rated the album as his favorite of the band's releases, feeling that the album marked a sweet spot in the band's career, where they had freedom due to the prior album's success, but had not developed a fear of failing to create a followup yet.

== Critical reception ==
Professional ratings
Review scores
Source	Rating
AllMusic	3/5 stars
The A.V. Club	(mixed)
Christgau's Consumer Guide	(choice cut)
Entertainment Weekly	B+
Kerrang!	4/5 stars
Rolling Stone	3/5 stars
Spin	6/10

The album was generally well received by critics. AllMusic's Stephen Thomas Erlewine praised the album for proving that they were "stronger and more serious than many of their post-grunge peers" and concluding that "there's not quite enough of it this time around to make Blue the equal of its predecessor, but it should be enough to please devoted fans." The A.V. Club writer Stephen Thompson agreed, noting that "its second half is particularly aimless and dire—but it's got its moments, particularly the sparkly, hitworthy single 'Never Let You Go' and 'Anything,' which opens the album with two minutes of pop joy." In a mixed review from Spin, Mark Lepage remarked that the band were "lightweights trying their hooks out on the heavy bag", noticing influences from the Rolling Stones, U2, and Kiss.

James Hunter of Rolling Stone praised the album for its "finely worked-out chunks of serious gun-metal rockcraft that depend on the San Francisco band's restless, edgy electric guitars" and concluded that the album was a rarity in the way it "works best as either background rock or intimate headphone material." Elysa Gardner of Entertainment Weekly noted Jenkins's lyrics and vocal delivery and Cadogan's guitar-work as standout elements of the album.

== Track listing ==
All tracks are produced by Stephan Jenkins, The Mud Sisters, Arion Salazar, and Third Eye Blind; except "Slow Motion", produced by Jenkins, David Gleeson, and Ren Klyce.

No.	Title	Writer(s)	Length
1.	"Anything"	Stephan Jenkins	1:59
2.	"Wounded"	Jenkins; Kevin Cadogan	4:51
3.	"10 Days Late"	Jenkins; Arion Salazar	3:05
4.	"Never Let You Go"	Jenkins	3:57
5.	"Deep Inside of You"	Jenkins	4:10
6.	"1000 Julys"	Jenkins; Cadogan	3:53
7.	"An Ode to Maybe"	Jenkins; Cadogan	2:36
8.	"The Red Summer Sun"	Jenkins; Cadogan	5:25
9.	"Camouflage"	Jenkins; Cadogan	4:35
10.	"Farther"	Jenkins	4:02
11.	"Slow Motion" (instrumental)	Jenkins	4:34
12.	"Darkness"	Jenkins; Cadogan	5:10
13.	"Darwin"	Jenkins; Salazar	20:55
Total length:			69:03

- "Darwin" ends at 3:50. After 15 minutes of silence, hidden song "The Red Summer Sun (Extended Coda)" begins 18 minutes 50 seconds into Track 13.
- Most streaming services have "Slow Motion" as the last (thirteenth) track instead of the eleventh.

Japanese edition bonus track
No.	Title	Writer(s)	Length
14.	"New Girl"	Jenkins	2:14

== Personnel ==
Personnel taken from Blue liner notes.

Third Eye Blind

- Stephan Jenkins – vocals (all tracks), guitar (tracks 1, 3–5, 7, 10, 11), percussion (tracks 2, 3, 6, 10), Hammond B3 (track 4), Memory Moog (track 5), keyboards (track 13), string arrangements
- Kevin Cadogan – guitar (tracks 1–10, 12, 13), backing vocals (tracks 6, 8, 12), electric sitar (track 9), piano (track 12)
- Arion Salazar – bass (tracks 1–10, 12, 13), guitar (tracks 1, 3–5, 7, 10, 13), backing vocals (tracks 2, 3, 5, 7, 8, 10), Prophet T8 (track 1), Univox (track 2), theremin (track 3), Wurlitzer (track 5), piano (track 5), Mellotron (track 8), electric sitar (track 13), Optigan (track 13), string arrangements
- Brad Hargreaves – drums (tracks 1–10, 12, 13), backing vocals (tracks 5, 12), piano (track 12)

Additional musicians

- Caitlin Cornwell, Ledisi, Teal Collins, Mauri Skinfill, Chris Manning, Golden Gate Boys Choir – additional vocals
- Marc Capelle – piano, clavinet
- Carla Kihlstedt, Marika Hughes – strings
- Ben Kramer – trumpet (track 1)
- D.J. Chutney – tamboura box (track 9)
- Steve Cohen – piano (track 11)
- Ren Klyce – keyboards (track 11)

Technical personnel

- Albert Beltran Jr. – assistant engineer (tracks 1–10, 12, 13)
- Jason Carmer – engineer (tracks 1–10, 12, 13), mixing (tracks 9, 10, 12)
- Mike Cresswell – additional engineering (tracks 1–10, 12, 13)
- Brian Gardner – mastering
- David Gleeson – engineer (track 11)
- Femio Hernandez – assistant engineer (tracks 3, 6, 7, 12)
- Mauricio Iragorri – assistant engineer (tracks 1, 2, 4, 5, 13)
- Jacquire King – Pro Tools editing
- Tom Lord-Alge – mixing (tracks 1–7, 11, 13)
- Alex Osbourne – assistant engineer (tracks 1–10, 12, 13)
- Clint Roth – Pro Tools editing
- Kevin Scott – assistant engineer (tracks 9, 10, 12)
- Toby Wright – mixing (track 8)

== Charts ==
=== Weekly charts ===
Weekly chart performance
Chart (1999–2000)	Peak position
New Zealand Albums (RMNZ)	34
UK Rock & Metal Albums (Official Charts)	20
US Billboard 200	40

=== Year-end charts ===
Year-end chart performance
Chart (2000)	Position
US Billboard 200	71

== Certifications ==
Certifications
Region	Certification	Certified units/sales
United States (RIAA)	Platinum	1,000,000^{^}
^{^} Shipments figures based on certification alone.
