= 10 Days Late =

Single by Third Eye Blind

from the album Blue
- Released: April 11, 2000
- Length: 3:05
- Label: Elektra
- Songwriters: Stephan Jenkins; Arion Salazar
- Producers: Stephan Jenkins; The Mud Sisters; Arion Salazar; Third Eye Blind

Third Eye Blind singles chronology
"Never Let You Go" (2000)	"10 Days Late" (2000)	"Deep Inside of You" (2000)

Music video
- "10 Days Late" on YouTube

"10 Days Late" is a song by the American alternative rock band Third Eye Blind. It was released on April 11, 2000, as the third single from the band's second studio album, Blue (1999). The song peaked at number 21 on the US Billboard Modern Rock Tracks chart. A music video was shot for the single.

== Background ==
"10 Days Late" was written by band members Stephan Jenkins and Arion Salazar. The song is about a friend of Jenkins who had impregnated his girlfriend at a young age; Jenkins was the baby's godfather.

According to Jenkins: "This [song] is more than just a modern rock hit about menstruation. It's sort of acknowledging how life is going to come along, and your status quo will be interrupted. It's gonna happen."

== Release ==
"10 Days Late" was released as the third single from Third Eye Blind's 1999 album, Blue. It was also included on the band's 2006 compilation album, A Collection. "10 Days Late" spent 10 weeks on the US Billboard Modern Rock Tracks chart, peaking at number 21 on June 17, 2000.

== Music video ==
The song's music video was directed by Francis Lawrence and was shot in March 2000. It features the band performing the song in a living room.

== Charts ==
=== Weekly charts ===
Chart (2000)	Peak position
US Alternative Airplay (Billboard)	21

=== Year-end charts ===
Chart (2000)	Position
US Modern Rock Tracks (Billboard)	87

== Release history ==
Release dates and formats for "10 Days Late"
Region	Date	Format(s)	Label(s)	Ref.
United States	April 11, 2000	Alternative radio	Elektra	
United States	April 25, 2000	Mainstream rock; active rock radio	Elektra	
