= Red Star (EP) =

Red Star EP

EP by Third Eye Blind
- Released: November 18, 2008
- Genre: Power pop
- Length: 14:07
- Labels: MRI; Assembly

Third Eye Blind chronology
A Collection (2006)	Red Star EP (2008)	Ursa Major (2009)

Professional ratings
Review scores
Source	Rating
AbsolutePunk.net	(78%)
Punktastic	3.5/5 stars

Red Star is a digital-only EP by Third Eye Blind released in 2008 in anticipation of their fourth studio album Ursa Major. Previews of the songs on the EP were posted to the band's Myspace page on November 12, 2008, and it was released officially on November 18, 2008 through all major digital music outlets. Also released with the EP was a music video for "Non-Dairy Creamer", with featured footage from Third Eye Blind's Japan tour that year.

All three tracks were set to be released on Ursa Major, however, only "Why Can't You Be" made the final album.

== Track listing ==
All music is composed by Third Eye Blind.

No.	Title	Writer(s)	Length
1.	"Non-Dairy Creamer"	Stephan Jenkins; Tony Fredianelli	4:26
2.	"Red Star"	Jenkins; Arion Salazar	4:00
3.	"Why Can't You Be?" (Live)	Jenkins	5:41
Total length:			14:07

== Personnel ==
- Stephan Jenkins – vocals, guitar
- Tony Fredianelli – guitar, backing vocals
- Arion Salazar – bass guitar
- Brad Hargreaves – drums, percussion
