= Out of the Vein =

Studio album by Third Eye Blind
- Released: May 13, 2003
- Recorded: 2002–2003
- Studio: Skywalker Sound; Mourning Wood
- Genre: Rock
- Length: 61:08
- Label: Elektra
- Producer: Stephan Jenkins

Third Eye Blind chronology
Blue (1999)	Out of the Vein (2003)	A Collection (2006)

Third Eye Blind studio chronology
Blue (1999)	Out of the Vein (2003)	Ursa Major (2009)

Singles from Out of The Vein
- 1. "Blinded (When I See You)" Released: March 24, 2003; 2. "Crystal Baller" Released: August 25, 2003

Out of the Vein is the third studio album by American rock band Third Eye Blind. Released on May 13, 2003, Out of the Vein is the band's first album with guitarist Tony Fredianelli, who replaced longtime guitarist Kevin Cadogan in 2000. It would also be Third Eye Blind's final album with Elektra Records as well as their final album with bassist Arion Salazar.

== Writing and recording ==
Out of the Vein was recorded at the group's own Mourning Wood Studios in downtown San Francisco and at Skywalker Sound. Frontman Stephan Jenkins felt that Out of the Vein would mark "a new period for the band", and added that "The first two albums were like two parts of the same piece. We've had a hiatus. This is a new beginning." Jenkins reported having written over 40 songs for the album as of August 2001, just prior to starting the recording process for the album. Out of the Vein was originally scheduled to be released in early 2002, but was delayed several times before its release in May 2003. According to Jenkins, some of the reasons for the delay stemmed from a self-imposed pressure to live up to Third Eye Blind's previous successes, leading him to rewrite lyrics.

The material went over many changes before finally being released. Jenkins originally wanted the album to be titled Crystal Baller, after the song of the same name, but it was renamed to Out of the Vein because the other members hated the name. The single "Blinded" was originally titled "When I See You". A scrapped collaboration with hard rock artist Andrew W.K. was still set to be on the album less than two months before the album's final release date. Their collaboration was titled "Messed Up Kid". Jenkins and Salazar were motivated to work with him after having attended a live show of Andrew W.K.'s, and coming away from the experience equal parts baffled and impressed by his style of music. The song featured Andrew W.K. performing backup vocals; Jenkins noted that "his voice is so hilarious because it sounds like it's doubled and compressed, but it's not."

The song "Misfits" initially started as a collaboration between Jenkins and Limp Bizkit frontman Fred Durst. Jenkins spoke about a Third Eye Blind collaboration with Durst in 2000, after Durst invited Jenkins to collaborate on their 2000 album Chocolate Starfish and the Hot Dog Flavored Water, although neither collaboration ever surfaced. Jenkins had visited Durst while he was recording Chocolate Starfish in 2000, and the two had co-written a track together in between Limp Bizkit recording sessions. Jenkins reported the song featured Durst on guitar and Jenkins on vocals, with a "funky" sound atypical of either band's work. Per Jenkins in 2002, this iteration of the song credited Durst with writing the chords, Jenkins with writing the melody and lyrics, and Salazar with writing the bridge; the final version of the song that made the album lacks a Durst performance or writing credit.

As of May 2002, Jenkins reported that they had almost 26 completed songs, and had narrowed it down to 12 songs they felt would make the final tracklist. Jenkins revised and tweaked lyrics for the album through April 2003 - a month prior to the album's release - at which point he had settled on the final 14 song tracklist.

== Themes and composition ==
Much of the music on the album was written while Jenkins was suffering through an extended period of depression in late 2000 and 2001. Jenkins noted in 2001 that he wished for the album to have more complex, layered compositions. He wanted to make a rock album, motivated to provide a counterpoint to Radiohead's Thom Yorke's then-recent assertion that rock was no longer interesting to him.

== Promotion and release ==
By the time the album was completed and released, Elektra Records was in the midst of being absorbed into Atlantic Records, and Jenkins contends the group was not a priority: "Our record company ceased to exist the month the record was released ... Elektra Records imploded. It was just letterhead." The album cover is by photographer Mick Rock, and according to Jenkins screams "rock joy". The first 100,000 copies of the CD included a DVD documenting the making of the album.

== Reception ==
Professional ratings
Aggregate scores
Source	Rating
Metacritic	59/100
Review scores
Source	Rating
AllMusic	3/5 stars
Blender	2/5 stars
E!	B−
Entertainment Weekly	B
Now	3/5 stars
Rolling Stone	2/5 stars
Slant Magazine	3/5 stars
Spin	C+

The album debuted at #12 on the Billboard 200 with 63,000 copies sold in its first week. By 2004, the album had sold 192,000 copies in the US.

While Out of the Vein has yet to be certified by the RIAA, the album had sold about 500,000 copies as of March 2007.

== Track listing ==
No.	Title	Writer(s)	Length
1.	"Faster"	Stephan Jenkins	3:32
2.	"Blinded"	Jenkins · Arion Salazar · Tony Fredianelli	4:22
3.	"Forget Myself"	Jenkins · Salazar	4:11
4.	"Danger"	Jenkins · Salazar · Fredianelli · Brad Hargreaves	3:12
5.	"Crystal Baller"	Jenkins	4:15
6.	"My Hit and Run"	Jenkins · Fredianelli	4:21
7.	"Misfits"	Jenkins	4:19
8.	"Can't Get Away"	Jenkins · Salazar	3:44
9.	"Wake for Young Souls"	Jenkins	4:38
10.	"Palm Reader"	Jenkins · Fredianelli	4:53
11.	"Self Righteous"	Jenkins · Salazar	6:18
12.	"Company"	Jenkins · Fredianelli	3:53
13.	"Good Man"	Jenkins	4:07
14.	"Another Life" (hidden track)	Jenkins · Salazar	4:29
Total length:			01:00:53

Japanese bonus track
No.	Title	Writer(s)	Length
15.	"My Time in Exile"	Jenkins · Salazar	3:17
Total length:			01:04:10

== Personnel ==
Personnel taken from Out of the Vein CD booklet.

Third Eye Blind

- Stephan Jenkins – vocals, guitar
- Arion Salazar – bass, guitar, vocals
- Tony Fredianelli – guitar, vocals
- Brad Hargreaves – drums, percussion

Additional musicians

- Hrundi V. Bakshi
- Sam Bass
- Vanessa Carlton
- Kimya Dawson
- DJ Flair
- Kim Shattuck

Artwork

- Mick Rock – cover photo, photography
- Third Eye Blind – art direction

Production

- Stephan Jenkins – producer
- Arion Salazar – co-producer
- Jason Carmer – co-producer and engineer (all except "Danger"); mixing (5, 6, 8, 10–13)
- Sean Beresford – engineer
- Tom Lord-Alge – mixing (1–4, 7, 9)
- Emily Lazar – mastering
- Dann Michael Thompson – second engineer (Skywalker Sound)
- Judy Kirschner – second engineer (Skywalker Sound)
- Femio Hernandez — second engineer (Southbeach Studios)
- Sarah Register – assistant engineer (The Lodge)

== Charts ==
Chart performance
Chart (2003)	Peak position
Canadian Albums (Nielsen SoundScan)	29
US Billboard 200	12
