= Jumper (Third Eye Blind song) =

1998 single by Third Eye Blind

Single by Third Eye Blind

from the album Third Eye Blind
- Released: August 4, 1998
- Studio: Toast, Skywalker Ranch, H.O.S. (San Francisco)
- Genre: Alternative rock; power pop
- Length: 4:33 (album version); 4:06 (single version)
- Label: Elektra
- Songwriter: Stephan Jenkins
- Producers: Stephan Jenkins; Eric Valentine

Third Eye Blind singles chronology
"Losing a Whole Year" (1997)	"Jumper" (1998)	"Anything" (1999)

Music video
- "Jumper" on YouTube

"Jumper" is a song by American rock band Third Eye Blind from their eponymous debut studio album (1997). The song was written and produced by frontman Stephan Jenkins, with additional production by Eric Valentine. Elektra Records released it as the fifth and final single from the album on August 4, 1998. An alternative rock and acoustic power pop song, the lyrics concern an act of suicide, as Jenkins urges for a greater amount of human compassion.

Music critics praised the track's overall composition. In the United States, the song peaked at number five on the Billboard Hot 100 in addition to peaking in the top ten for several genre-specific charts. It also reached the top ten in Canada. The song was recorded and mixed in and around San Francisco at Toast Studios, Skywalker Ranch, H.O.S., and The Site by Valentine. "Jumper" is a lament centrally inspired by the suicide of a bullied gay teenager. However, Jenkins also was inspired by his own dysfunctional experiences when growing up. The instrumentation used in the song includes guitars and a piano.

The song is notable for its diegetic use by Jim Carrey's character in the movie Yes Man, whereby Carrey's character plays a spontaneous cover of the song on an acoustic guitar to persuade a would-be jumper from taking their own life.

== Writing and inspiration ==
"My parents divorced, and that hurt me. We were poor and I went to a rich high school. I was dyslexic and had attention deficit disorder, which I still have. So I carried all these things with me. One afternoon, I had this epiphany. I said 'You know what? I don't have it all together. I come from stuff that was really difficult, and that's me. That's who I am.' I embraced that. There's a line in the song that says, 'Everyone's got to face down the demons/Maybe today we can put the past away.' It's very much a song about putting the past away."

— Stephan Jenkins talking to Teen People about the song's inspiration.

"Jumper" was written solely by frontman Stephan Jenkins. Jenkins intended to write a song about the perils of bullying, with the song's narrative focusing on a "friend who’s gay jumping off a bridge and killing themselves." This narrative was inspired by a friend of band manager Eric Godtland who committed suicide in high school due to bullying he endured for his sexuality. In an interview with SongFacts, Jenkins said that the concept of the song was further developed through his own alienating childhood experiences. Despite being written as a lament, Jenkins expressed that a broader message of "Jumper" is to have an understanding and compassion for one another. He further explained the meaning of the song:

"Jumper" is about a guy who jumped off the Coronado Bridge and killed himself. It's kind of a noir-inspired story, and the point was if we have more understanding for each other, then we might give each other credit. And if you don’t want to see me again, I'd understand. Sometimes when you really help people and you make yourself vulnerable and they can’t really see you [afterwards]. I had a friend who was raped and she needed money for medical care. [A]nd she was ashamed and couldn’t talk to her parents about it... basically, after I helped her she didn’t want to see me. She gave a bit too much of herself. I understood that.

Since the release of "Jumper," Jenkins has identified that the meaning of the song has changed for many listeners. He felt that the song's meaning was not entirely understood upon release, although "[n]ow it has this real levity. It's this huge moment of release for the audience." Lyndsey Parker from Yahoo! Entertainment designated the song as an "anti-bullying anthem," which prompted Jenkins to acknowledge that he believes "Jumper" has resonated among many LGBT listeners.

== Recording and mixing ==
Speaking on the recording of "Jumper", Jenkins commented: "I was looking for a real thud in the drums… I wanted a thickness in midrange, so we put the drums in a smaller room and opened the doors so it had a sense of breathing. For 'Jumper,' I gave Brad — who uses these big sticks — I gave him some small sticks, and put the riser in the middle of the room and did it with no reverb, like a Beatles thing." Eric Valentine was responsible for the mixing of the track, which was made at The Site, H.O.S, and Toast Studios. Ted Jensen mastered the track at Sterling Sound Studios in New York City.

== Composition ==
"Jumper" is an alternative rock and acoustic power pop song. According to the sheet music published at Musicnotes.com by Alfred Publishing, the song is written in the key of C major and is set in time signature of common time with a tempo of 88 beats per minute. Jenkins' vocal range spans one octave, from C_{4} to A_{5}.

== Critical reception ==
Justin Joffe of Observer referred to the song as a "catchy acoustic jangle" that addresses suicide. Mark Jenkins of The Washington Post believed the song's lyrical content of "potential suicide" treaded familiar territory.

== Chart performance ==
In the United States, "Jumper" debuted at number 16 on the Billboard Hot 100 chart for the issue dated December 5, 1998. The song spent a total of 20 weeks on the chart, peaking at number five for the issue dated January 30, 1999.

== Music video ==
=== Background ===
The music video was directed by Yariv Gaber. As a friend of drummer Brad Hargreaves, American model Anna Nicole Smith visited the set on the day of shooting, which led to her making an appearance in the video.

=== Synopsis ===
The video primarily takes place in a crowded club and focuses on a young man who wanders in and around the surrounding area of the city; interacting with various people. Stephan Jenkins primarily sings while Kevin Cadogan is seen making out with various women, some of whom are implied to be escorts. A pregnant street walker, a promiscuous and flirtatious hustler, and a free-spirited partier are those shown frequently throughout the video. Eventually, Jenkins sings directly to the young man who seems empowered by the message. As the video ends, Jenkins briefly transforms into a little boy playing a snare drum to match with the ending of the song.

== Live performances ==
In September 2015, Jenkins joined Demi Lovato on their iHeartRadio Music Festival set for a performance of "Jumper". The song was performed at a charity concert at the Rock and Roll Hall of Fame to a crowd of 2016 Republican National Convention attendees. The band performed "Jumper" and "Non-Dairy Creamer" in protest of the Republican Party's party platform, with Jenkins speaking out in support of LGBT rights and science.

== Track listings and formats ==
- 7-inch and cassette single
1. "Jumper" (radio edit) – 4:06
2. "Graduate" (remix) – 3:26
- US and Australian CD single
1. "Jumper" (radio edit)
2. "Graduate" (remix)
3. "Jumper" (video)

== Credits and personnel ==
Credits and personnel are adapted from the Third Eye Blind album liner notes.

- Kevin Cadogan – guitar, vocals
- Brad Hargreaves – drums
- Stephan Jenkins – writer, vocals, guitars, percussion, keyboard arrangements, producer
- Arion Salazar – bass, vocals, piano
- Eric Valentine – engineering, producer, mixing
- Ted Jensen – mastering

== Charts ==
=== Weekly charts ===
Weekly chart performance for "Jumper"
Chart (1998–1999)	Peak position
Canada Top Singles (RPM)	10
US Billboard Hot 100	5
US Adult Alternative Airplay (Billboard)	17
US Adult Pop Airplay (Billboard)	5
US Alternative Airplay (Billboard)	9
US Pop Airplay (Billboard)	2

=== Year-end charts ===
1998 year-end chart performance for "Jumper"
Chart (1998)	Position
US Adult Top 40 (Billboard)	54
US Mainstream Top 40 (Billboard)	43
US Modern Rock Tracks (Billboard)	32

1999 year-end chart performance for "Jumper"
Chart (1999)	Position
Canada Top Singles (RPM)	89
US Billboard Hot 100	40
US Adult Top 40 (Billboard)	11
US Mainstream Top 40 (Billboard)	28
US Modern Rock Tracks (Billboard)	99

== Certifications ==
Certifications and sales for "Jumper"
Region	Certification	Certified units/sales
New Zealand (RMNZ)	Gold	15,000^{‡}
United States (RIAA)	3× Platinum	3,000,000^{‡}
^{‡} Sales+streaming figures based on certification alone.

== Release history ==
Release dates and formats for "Jumper"
Region	Date	Format(s)	Label(s)	Ref.
United States	August 4, 1998	Contemporary hit radio	Elektra	
United States	January 12, 1999	7-inch vinyl; CD; cassette	Elektra	

== See also ==
- List of Radio & Records number-one singles of 1998
