= Never Let You Go (Third Eye Blind song) =

2000 single by Third Eye Blind

Single by Third Eye Blind

from the album Blue
- B-side: "Anything" (extended); "New Girl"
- Released: January 4, 2000
- Genre: Power pop; pop rock
- Length: 3:57
- Label: Elektra; Eastwest
- Songwriter: Stephan Jenkins
- Producers: Stephan Jenkins; The Mud Sisters; Arion Salazar; Third Eye Blind

Third Eye Blind singles chronology
"Anything" (1999)	"Never Let You Go" (2000)	"10 Days Late" (2000)

Music video
- "Never Let You Go" on YouTube

"Never Let You Go" is a song by American rock band Third Eye Blind. It was released on January 4, 2000, as the second single from their second album, Blue. The song peaked at number 14 on the US Billboard Hot 100 and spent three weeks at number one in Canada. It also reached number 26 in Iceland, number 15 in New Zealand, and number six on the UK Rock Singles Chart.

== Content ==
The writing credits of the song are a subject of debate among frontman Stephan Jenkins and former bassist Arion Salazar. Despite Jenkins being credited as the sole writer of the song, Salazar claims to have written the bass melodies, bridge, and chord progressions. In an interview with RIFF Magazine, Salazar claimed that Jenkins approached him, stating, "I really want to get the credit on [Never Let You Go]. Maybe if I give you a little more percentage [of the song's profit] I could just leave my name on it?".

Jenkins commented in the liner notes of the band's compilation album A Collection that it was written about a muse of his at the time (allegedly Charlize Theron), and it was written to "freak her out" when she heard it on the radio.

== Composition ==
According to the sheet music published at Musicnotes.com by Alfred Publishing, the song is written in the key of E major and is set in time signature of common time with a tempo of 112 beats per minute.

== Critical reception ==
Billboard music reviewer and editor Chuck Taylor said that the song "packs in the hooks; a compelling opening guitar riff, a celebratory party ambience, an end-of-song spoken part that kids everywhere will be reciting ad-nauseam, and lead singer/writer/co-producer Stephan Jenkins' dead-on vocals, delivered in a pleasing falsetto at times". He continued to praise the song, calling the chorus "easy, spirited, memorable — the stuff that hits are made of." Elysa Gardner of Entertainment Weekly called the song "crackling, power-pop", commenting that it is nearly as captivating as "Semi-Charmed Life". Stephen Thomas Erlewine of AllMusic praised the song's hook, referring to "Never Let You Go" as the album's highlight. Stephen Thompson of The A.V. Club declared that the song is a standout on Blue, calling it a "sparkly, hitworthy single". Julie River of Punknews.org praised the "beautiful chord-based hook", favorably comparing the song to lead single "Anything".

== Commercial performance ==
On the US Billboard Hot 100, "Never Let You Go" first at appeared at number 65 on the week dated January 22, 2000, becoming that issue's "Hot Shot Debut". Ten weeks later, on April 1, 2000, the song reached its peak of number 14 on the Hot 100, and it stayed on the listing for 22 weeks, last charting at number 46 on June 17. The song became a top-five hit on four other Billboard charts, reaching number three on the Adult Top 40, number four on the Triple-A and Modern Rock Tracks charts, and number five on the Mainstream Top 40. At the end of 2000, Billboard ranked the song as the 43rd-most-successful hit of the year, and it was certified platinum by the Recording Industry Association of America (RIAA) for selling and streaming over 1,000,000 units. "Never Let You Go" became a number-one hit on Canada's RPM 100 Hit Tracks chart, debuting at number 39 on January 24, 2000, and rising to the top position on the issue of March 27. In addition, the song peaked at number two on the RPM Top 30 Rock Report and number 37 on the Adult Contemporary Tracks ranking.

Outside North America, "Never Let You Go" first charted on New Zealand's RIANZ Singles Chart on February 13, 2000, debuting at number 44. Over the next four weeks, the song rose up the chart, peaking at number 15 on March 5, 2000. It spent the next eight weeks rising and falling in the top 30 and remained in the top 50 for a total of 19 weeks. In August 2026, Recorded Music NZ (RMNZ) awarded the song a gold certification for sales and streaming units exceeding 15,000. In Australia, the song stalled at number 63 after debuting on the ARIA Singles Chart in late February 2000. The following month, the song debuted on the Icelandic Singles Chart at number 32 and reached its peak of number 26 on April 28. Despite failing to reach the top 100 in the United Kingdom, "Never Let You Go" debuted and peaked at number six on the UK Rock Singles Chart on June 11, 2000.

== Music video ==
A music video for the song was released in January 2000, directed by Chris Hafner. It features the band performing on a metal platform high in a sunset-filled sky. Interspersed with the platform scenes are scenes of the band eating in a dimly-lit Chinese restaurant with several girls, going to a nightclub, and lead singer Stephan Jenkins meeting a girl backstage at a concert. During the first verse, Jenkins hangs from the bottom of the platform while his bandmates and several girls hang onto him, looking down apprehensively. In the first chorus, another girl dressed in a black latex outfit and matching thigh-high boots appears and climbs this human ladder up to the platform. Meredith Gottlieb of MTV News referred to the video as "abstract".

== Track listings ==
- Australian CD single
1. "Never Let You Go" (radio version) – 3:58
2. "Anything" (extended version) – 2:48
3. "New Girl" – 2:17
- European maxi-CD single
1. "Never Let You Go" (radio version) – 3:57
2. "Never Let You Go" (LP version) – 3:57
3. "Anything" (extended version) – 2:46

== Credits and personnel ==
Credits and personnel are adapted from the "Never Let You Go" CD single liner notes and the Blue album booklet.

- Stephan Jenkins – vocals, guitar, Hammond B-3 organ
- Kevin Cadogan – guitar
- Arion Salazar – bass
- Brad Hargreaves – drums
- Jason Carmer – engineering
- Tom Lord-Alge – mixing at South Beach Studios (Miami)
- Brian Gardner – mastering at Bernie Grundman Mastering

== Charts ==
=== Weekly charts ===
Weekly chart performance for "Never Let You Go"
Chart (2000)	Peak position
Australia (ARIA)	63
Canada Top Singles (RPM)	1
Canada Adult Contemporary (RPM)	37
Canada Rock/Alternative (RPM)	2
Iceland (Íslenski Listinn Topp 40)	26
New Zealand (Recorded Music NZ)	15
UK Singles (OCC)	195
UK Rock & Metal (Official Charts)	6
US Billboard Hot 100	14
US Adult Alternative Airplay (Billboard)	4
US Adult Pop Airplay (Billboard)	3
US Alternative Airplay (Billboard)	4
US Pop Airplay (Billboard)	5

=== Year-end charts ===
Year-end chart performance for "Never Let You Go"
Chart (2000)	Position
US Billboard Hot 100	43
US Adult Top 40 (Billboard)	5
US Mainstream Top 40 (Billboard)	32
US Modern Rock Tracks (Billboard)	28
US Triple-A (Billboard)	8

== Certifications ==
Certifications for "Never Let You Go"
Region	Certification	Certified units/sales
New Zealand (RMNZ)	Gold	15,000^{‡}
United States (RIAA)	Platinum	1,000,000^{‡}
^{‡} Sales+streaming figures based on certification alone.

== Release history ==
Release history and formats for "Never Let You Go"
Region	Date	Format(s)	Label(s)	Ref.
United States	January 4, 2000	Alternative radio	Elektra	
United Kingdom	May 15, 2000	CD	EastWest	

== RAC, Matthew Koma, and Hilary Duff version ==
On February 12, 2020, Portuguese-American musician RAC released a cover version of "Never Let You Go" as a stand-alone single, featuring both Matthew Koma and Hilary Duff.
