= Third Eye Blind =

American rock band

- Third Eye Blind performing in 2023.

Background information
- Also known as: 3EB
- Origin: San Francisco, California, U.S.
- Genres: Alternative rock; pop rock; post-grunge; power pop; pop-punk
- Works: Discography
- Years active: 1993–present
- Labels: Warner; Elektra; Mega Collider; Megaforce
- Members: Stephan Jenkins; Brad Hargreaves; Kryz Reid; Alex LeCavalier; Colin Creev
- Past members: Kevin Cadogan; Jason Slater; Adrian Burley; Michael Urbano; Arion Salazar; Steve Bowman; Tony Fredianelli; Alex Kopp
- Website: thirdeyeblind.com

Third Eye Blind (3EB) is an American rock band formed in San Francisco, California, in 1993. After years of lineup changes in the early and mid-1990s, the songwriting duo of Stephan Jenkins and Kevin Cadogan signed the band's first major-label recording contract with Elektra Records in 1996. The band released their self-titled debut album in 1997, with the band largely consisting of Jenkins (vocals, rhythm guitar), Cadogan (lead guitar), Arion Salazar (bass guitar), and Brad Hargreaves (drums). Shortly after the release of the band's second album in 1999, Blue, Cadogan was released from the band under controversial circumstances.

The band continued, but with many lineup changes and long gaps between album releases for the next fifteen years. The band released Out of the Vein in 2003 and Ursa Major in 2009 with guitarist Tony Fredianelli, but parted ways with him shortly afterwards, leaving only Jenkins and Hargreaves as the remaining core members. The band's lineup stabilized again in the mid-2010s, adding Kryz Reid (lead guitar), Alex Kopp (keyboards), and Alex LeCavalier (bass guitar). The new lineup led to increased output with less time between releases - Dopamine (2015), and a string of EPs, We Are Drugs (2016) and Thanks for Everything (2018). After Kopp was replaced by Colin Creev, (Note: Real name Colin Holbrook) the sixth and seventh studio albums Screamer (2019) and Our Bande Apart (2021) were released.

The band found commercial success in the late 1990s, with Third Eye Blind and Blue certified platinum six times and single platinum in the United States, respectively. Several songs were commercial successes as well, with "Semi-Charmed Life", "Jumper", and "How's It Going to Be", all reaching the Top 10 of the US Billboard Hot 100, and "Never Let You Go" reaching the Top 20. Third Eye Blind has sold around twelve million records worldwide.

== History ==
=== Formation and early years: 1990–1996 ===
The band's origins trace back to the early 1990s, with frontman Stephan Jenkins writing music, but struggling to hold together a consistent musical lineup. Originally, Jenkins started his music career as one half of an interracial rap duo Puck and Natty with musician Herman Anthony Chunn, who went by the stage name Zen. The two managed to attract some attention from record labels - enough to get one of their few recorded songs "Just Wanna Be Your Friend" on a soundtrack for the television drama Beverly Hills, 90210. They were in talks to being signed with Capitol Records, but Jenkins did not agree on the label's views on the musical direction or what music producer with which they would work, and negotiations fell through. The group broke up shortly afterwards, and while short-lived, it was in the group that Jenkins developed connections in the music industry, and wrote the first iteration of what would become Third Eye Blind's biggest hit, "Semi-Charmed Life".

After the Puck and Zen experience, Jenkins moved in the direction of starting a rock band. Jenkins recounted that over the span of a few years, he recruited members, and they dropped out because of drug addiction or join other bands. Jenkins wrote and workshopped early material with musician Jason Slater for years before the band started up formally, and the two recorded the band's first demo together in 1993. Jenkins reconnected with music producer and sound engineer David Gleeson, a contact from his Puck and Natty days, to be able to record demos at professional studios like Skywalker Ranch. Gleeson assisted in the sessions, but eventually had a falling-out with Jenkins and stopped working with the band. George Earth played guitar on some demos. Much of the contents of the first demo, such as the track "Hold Me Down", were scrapped and shelved, but Jenkins continued to work on some material like "Semi-Charmed Life" or "Alright Caroline" that were eventually released. Around this time, guitarist Tony Fredianelli auditioned for the band, though according to Slater, Jenkins believed him to be "too [heavy] metal" for the band. Around the time frame of 1993 and 1994, Slater departed the band, while guitarist Kevin Cadogan and bassist Arion Salazar joined. The band cycled through a number of drummers including Adrian Burley, Steve Bowman (Counting Crows), and Michael Urbano (Smash Mouth).

Salazar noted that the band struggled to make much progress prior to the arrival of Cadogan, and felt that the songs really started to develop when Cadogan's big guitar sound was added to Jenkins' more stripped-down demos. The two became songwriting partners, with Jenkins writing lyrics and Cadogan helping him brainstorm musical ideas; together, they worked on a second set of demos. The band toured locally during 1994 and early 1995, building up a following. However, in July 1995, the band hit a significant setback with a disastrous "Battle of the Bands" performance that would see the winner be offered a record deal. Urbano (the drummer at the time) quit shortly before the show, Jenkins was sick and unable to perform well, and Cadogan blew out his guitar amp two songs into the show. They lost the contest, and with it, the potential record deal and the confidence of their management and studio team, who left the band right afterwards. On the verge of breaking up, the band instead regrouped and recruited two new key people: Drummer Brad Hargreaves and manager Eric Godtland, a long-time personal friend and confidant of Jenkins. Jenkins, Cadogan, Salazar, and Hargreaves went on to be the core lineup for the band during the recording of its first two studio albums.

Through past connections of Slater and Godtland, Third Eye Blind started recording a third demo with producer and sound engineer Eric Valentine, with some additional funding from a partially interested RCA Records, from late 1995 to February 1996. Valentine noted that he had heard the demos the band had recorded prior to his arrival, but felt they were "not ready" and needed to be reworked or discarded. He later expressed more satisfaction with material he had worked on. RCA passed on the band after hearing the material, but the demos instead attracted the attention of Arista Records. Label founder Clive Davis invited the band to perform at a band showcase in New York City in March 1996. During Third Eye Blind concerts at the time, it was customary for the band to have a piñata release candy above their mosh pits, yet at the showcase for the record executives, lead singer Jenkins released live crickets from the piñata instead. Cadogan noted that the performance was ultimately unsuccessful, and Davis passed on signing the band; but the event built hype and attention for the band, and Salazar noted that the well-developed fourteen-song demo they had recorded with Valentine still had helped the band feel more prepared to deal with record labels. In April 1996, after Jenkins had challenged Epic Records executive Dave Massey in a meeting, the band landed an opening gig for Oasis at the San Francisco Civic Auditorium. In an unlikely scenario for an opening act, the band was invited back for an encore after playing their initial set and was paid double by the concert promoter. In addition, Jenkins' production of hip-hop duo The Braids' cover of Queen's "Bohemian Rhapsody" gained major-label attention. Afterwards, the band found themselves in a bidding war among record labels, and after another showcase in June 1996 in Los Angeles, the band signed a contract with Sylvia Rhone of Elektra Records because they believed that contract offered the most artistic freedom. The contract was later reported as the largest publishing deal ever for an unsigned artist at the time.

=== Third Eye Blind: 1997–1998 ===
While the band had accomplished their goal of getting signed, troubles persisted with the band. Jenkins and Valentine clashed; Valentine was hired as a sound engineer, but felt he was tasked with duties that a full-fledged music producer would do, without the pay that would normally come with the role. Valentine ended up getting a co-production credit, but people involved felt he did far more for the album than technically credited for. Valentine criticized Jenkins's decision to buyout all of Zen's early contribution to album material. Jenkins contended that he heavily reworked any of Zen's contributions. Cadogan became disillusioned throughout the recording sessions. His understanding was that his role in the band was of an equal partnership with Jenkins, but did not feel he was treated as such. Valentine reported that while Jenkins and Cadogan recorded good material together, they were constantly at odds with one another in the studio, with their relationship deteriorating over time as they finished the album. Additionally, unbeknownst to the rest of the band until years later, Jenkins secretly set up a Third Eye Blind Inc" as a corporation and named himself the sole owner and shareholder, giving him complete control over all legal and financial matters in the band.

Despite the issues, the band's debut album, Third Eye Blind, was finished and released in April 1997. As a new artist, the album did not particularly debut high in the US all-format Billboard 200 album's chart, and only ever peaked at number 25 on the chart, but consistently sold each week, staying on the chart for over a year straight. Sales approached one million in the US by the end of 1997. The album's sales were propelled by the success of their first single, the long-worked-upon and finalized version of "Semi-Charmed Life". It performed well on rock radio, topping the Billboard Modern Rock Tracks chart for eight weeks and found crossover success, peaking at number 4 on the Billboard Hot 100 chart. Four subsequent singles - "Graduate", "How's It Going to Be", "Losing a Whole Year", and "Jumper" - kept the album selling well into 1998. "How's It Going to Be" and "Jumper" similarly succeeded "Semi-Charmed Life" as crossover hits as well, peaking at number 9 and 5, respectively, on the all-format Billboard Hot 100 chart. The album was certified platinum six times by the RIAA, indicating over six million copies sold in the US. Meanwhile, Billboard named it the number one modern rock track of the year. The band toured extensively in support of the album, including opening for large acts such as U2 and The Rolling Stones in late 1997, before quickly graduating to headlining status afterwards throughout 1998. The band toured extensively throughout the year, including a three-month tour with Smash Mouth and a larger venue amphitheater tour mid-year, and a college tour with Eve 6. The touring was seen as a success, as the band continued to book increasingly higher profile shows but the touring was not without issues, including a 1997 show where Jenkins fell unconscious after falling off the side of a stage, Salazar missing some 1997 shows because he was hospitalized by a viral infection, and an incident at a festival in 1998 where Salazar and Green Day bassist Mike Dirnt got into a physical altercation.

=== Blue and departure of Cadogan: 1999–2000 ===
The band began work on a second album in January 1999, directly after finishing their 1998 tour with Eve 6. By March, Jenkins reported that there were already 30 songs in contention for the follow-up album, and that recording would start in April. The band were given a tight deadline of six months to submit a completely recorded album by October 1999. While Jenkins would publicly state that sessions were fast and carefree at the time, both Cadogan and Jenkins would retrospectively reflect on the sessions being very difficult. Cadogan and Jenkins were already not getting along while touring in support of their self-titled album, and Cadogan was outraged to finally find out that Jenkins had secretly legally and financially put himself in charge of the band, and of Salazar and Hargreaves's indifference to it. Cadogan recounted that he later found out that Jenkins and Godtland had started to make plans to replace Cadogan prior to even beginning work on a second album, but the plans were not acted on. Cadogan stated that he and Jenkins agreed to put aside their differences and work together on further music; Cadogan set up a two-week period where the band would write and record early song ideas in Cadogan's house with sound engineer Jason Carmer. Cadogan noted that it was the only time in the six-month period where the band collaborated and worked together in the same room; the rest of the parts were written and recorded independently at separate times in the studio and then later compiled together into the finished album because of the animosity between them. A major point of contention was which songs to keep on the album and which ones to cut; Jenkins and Cadogan had each written songs individually, and each of them fought for more of his own songs to make the final track list. Godtland set up a voting system where each member could vote for a certain number of songs, and that process led to further animosity. Among particular contention was the track "Slow Motion", a controversial ballad written by Jenkins about a student shooting a teacher's son. While Jenkins insisted that the song was satirical parody, and actually anti-violence, Elektra disapproved of the track being on the album, feeling it could cause controversy because of the recent Columbine High School massacre, which had just happened in April of that year. The band and the label fought over the song's inclusion for four months, with the label proposing a compromise that would allow only the instrumental to be on the album, and in return, the label would finance an EP to be released after the album, where the band could release the song in its entirety and have complete creative freedom, without restriction. Cadogan, already unhappy with his lack of ownership over the band, was the sole member of the band to object to the deal, knowing he would not have any control over the deal's terms of a cash advance and imprint label creation for the EP.

On November 23, 1999, the band released their second album, Blue. It sold 75,000 copies in the week it was released, and by 2003 had sold 1.25 million in the U.S. Four singles were released from the album: "Anything", "Never Let You Go", "10 Days Late", and "Deep Inside of You". "Never Let You Go" came close to replicating the success of the singles from the bands first album, peaking at number 14 on the Billboard all-format US singles chart. "Deep Inside of You" also made it on to the chart, albeit peaking at 69. "Anything" and "10 Days Late" performed moderately at rock radio, hitting 11 and 21 on the Billboard Modern Rock song chart. Blue was certified platinum by the RIAA, indicating over a million sold in the US; a strong achievement, but well below their first album's six time platinum achievement.

Two months after the album release, on January 26, 2000, it was announced that Cadogan had been fired after playing a show at the Sundance Film Festival. No reason for the termination was given at the time, just a message from Godtland that Jenkins, Salazar, and Hargreaves wished him well. Cadogan was replaced by Tony Fredianelli, who had briefly jammed with the band in 1993 in the band's formative years, and had sometimes supported the band as a live keyboardist as well. The new lineup toured heavily in support of the album, including a North American tour through much of 2000, including the "Dragons and Astronauts" tour with Tonic. In June 2000, Cadogan filed a multi-million dollar federal lawsuit against Jenkins. Cadogan alleged wrongful termination, adding that his production, recording, and songwriting royalties had been withheld since being kicked out of the band. The band pushed forward with touring in the meantime, continuing to play large venues, but felt pressure from the burgeoning teen pop and nu metal musical movements of the time, which they fell in between without being part of either. In this time period, Jenkins considered working with Limp Bizkit's Fred Durst, doing some early work on collaborating on material for both of their respective bands, though none of this material ended up being released by either party.

=== Out of the Vein: 2001–2004 ===
After four straight years of recording music and touring in support of it, the next couple years were less busy for the band. Originally, the band had planned on starting work on the EP they had agreed upon making as a vehicle to release the controversial "Slow Motion" song kept off of Blue by the label. The EP was originally titled Black, as a companion piece to Blue. Recording plans were delayed from late 2000, to early 2001. By 2001 Jenkins had fallen into a deep depression. He isolated himself for almost a year, and turned his attention to writing material for a third studio album, of which he amassed over 40 songs in this time. The band only played a handful of live performances, largely one-off benefit shows. Progress on the album would be slow. The third album was originally scheduled for release in early 2002, but was delayed several times until its release in May 2003. According to Jenkins, some of the reasons for the delay stemmed from a self-imposed pressure to live up to Third Eye Blind's previous successes, leading him to rewrite lyrics. The band spent substantial time building their own recording studio in San Francisco called Morningwood Studios. During this time, the band's lawsuit with Cadogan was settled out of court, with the terms of the settlement undisclosed.

On May 13, 2003, the band released their third studio album, Out of the Vein. The album debuted on the Billboard 200 chart at number 12; while the charting placement was higher than Blue's debut at 40, sales were actually substantially down, selling 62,000 copies, compared to Blue, which sold 74,000 copies. Two singles were released from the album: "Blinded" and "Crystal Baller". Neither songs performed to the level of prior singles; neither placed on the Billboard Hot 100 chart and only "Blinded" charted at rock radio, peaking at 35 on the Billboard Modern Rock songs chart. Out of the Vein long-term sales fell behind its predecessors, with numbers estimated around 500,000 copies as of March 2007. Elektra Records was being absorbed into Atlantic Records at the time, and because of the merger, the band found themselves without label support; as Jenkins said, "Our record company ceased to exist. The month the record was released, Elektra Records imploded." In May 2004, Warner Music cut Third Eye Blind, along with over 80 other acts, from its roster. While no specific reason was given for Third Eye Blind being cut, Atlantic co-chairman Craig Kallman said the cuts were made to get Atlantic's roster down to an appropriate size where "we can give each of our acts top priority." Plans to release an EP still persisted for a time. After the Out of the Vein sessions, the band dropped the name Black and started referring to the EP as Symphony of Decay. A month after the release of Out of the Vein, in June 2003, Jenkins stated to VH1 that the band planned on releasing the EP as soon as September 2003. However, it was repeatedly delayed, and Hargreaves indicated that its release became difficult after their departure from Elektra, and the idea was eventually dropped altogether. The full lyrics version of "Slow Motion" appeared on a greatest hits collection, A Collection in 2006.

=== Ursa Major: 2005–2010 ===
With promotional efforts for Out of the Vein fizzling out in 2004, the band again was less busy the following few years. Jenkins helped with producing then-girlfriend Vanessa Carlton's album Harmonium; the experience motivated Jenkins to start writing a solo album of his own. At the same time, Fredianelli, Salazar, and Hargreaves had been working on music together, and upon hearing it, Jenkins scrapped his solo plan in favor of working on a fourth studio album with the band. Work on the album began in early 2005, but progressed slowly, and Jenkins suffered from writer's block and struggled to write lyrics for the songs that had been created for him by the rest of the band. As of mid-2006, the album was untitled and had a rough release date of 2007. Around this time, Salazar became disillusioned with the band, and left. A replacement for Salazar was not found; in the coming years, Abe Millet and Leo Kramer played bass while touring, while a variety of bass players filled in while recording in the studio. In 2007, Jenkins announced that the fourth studio album had a tentative title of The Hideous Strength, had around 35 songs written for it, and that some of the lyrics had become political in nature. The band continued to tour, with the band previewing work-in-progress versions of new songs while Jenkins continued to revise lyrics. Despite it being years since the band released an album, the band still maintained a strong following in live performances, and the band continued to tour while Jenkins struggled with writer's block. Fredianelli noted that lyrics were continually being rewritten, and as a result, songs often needed to be re-recorded to accommodate the changes, which continued to delay an album release.

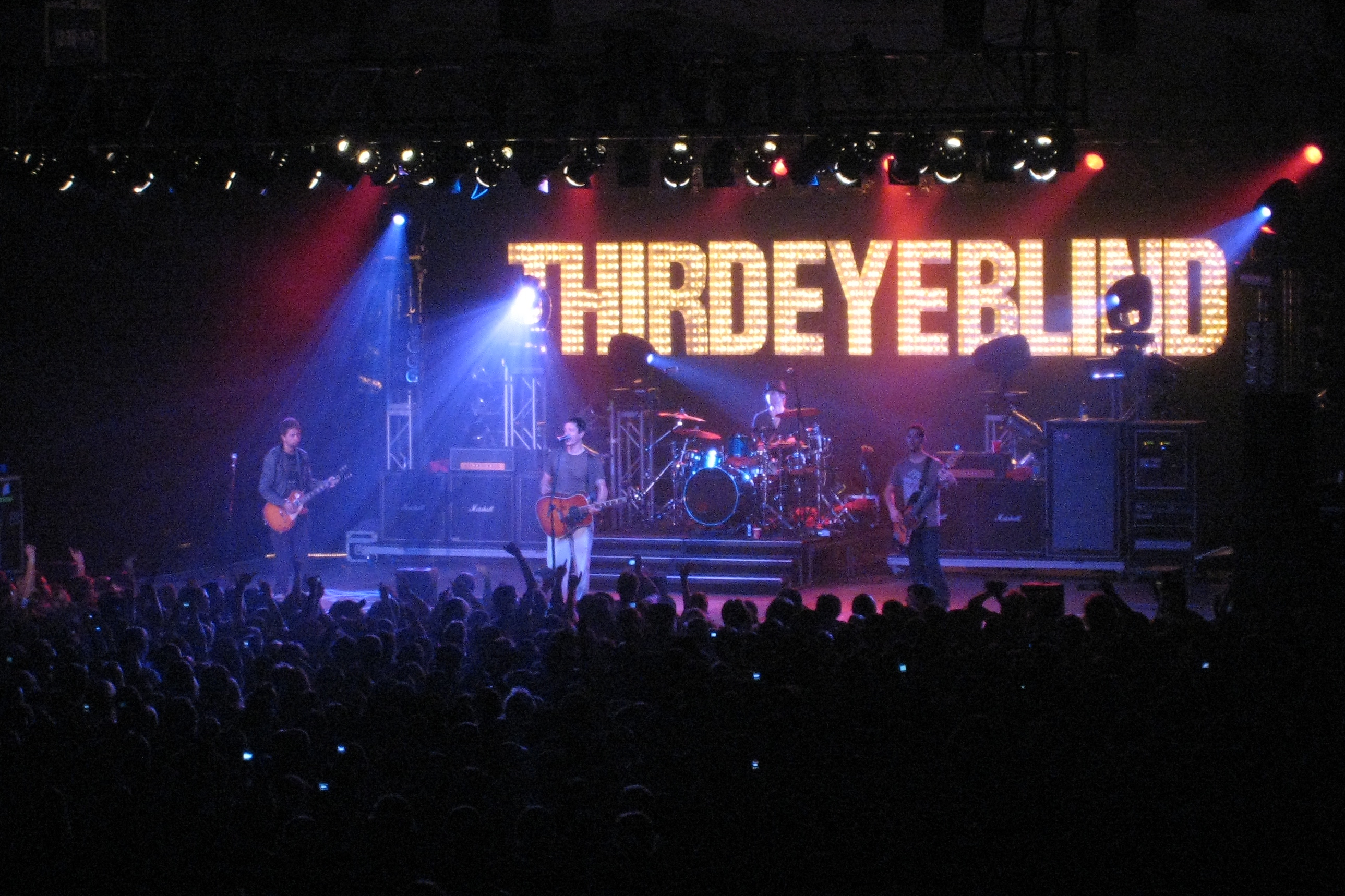
Third Eye Blind performs at SUNY Geneseo in 2007.

As the process would drag on, privately, internal strife flared up again across 2008. According to Fredianelli, morale was low at the time because of the departure of Salazar, Jenkins beginning to lose interest in the band, and tensions between Jenkins and long-time friend and band manager Eric Godtland. Jenkins fired Godtland and sued him, accusing him of not paying Jenkins enough, and Godtland in turn counter-sued him, responding that the lower pay was due to lessened productivity by the band, a fault of Jenkins himself, not Godtland, and this had caused an unfair decrease in pay for Godtland himself. Fredianelli claimed that Jenkins insisted that the rest of the band join in and file lawsuits against Godtland too, threatening to abandon the band if they did not. Fredianelli, not wanting to abandon the band after all the work done on the long-awaited album, went along with Jenkins's plan, creating a deposition against Godtland, creating friction between the two. As months passed, Fredianelli felt guilt about it, and apologized to Godtland, offering to change his deposition, then angering Jenkins in return. Jenkins's lawsuit was eventually dismissed, and Godtland settled his case out of court. The band's touring manager would unceremoniously quit shortly after.

Despite the discourse, the band persevered and by late 2008 the material they had been working on for the last five years was released. First, the band released a teaser of sorts through the three song Red Star EP. Secondly, two albums' worth of material had been written, but with struggles to finalize the recordings, the band opted against a formal double album release, in favor of potentially releasing two connected albums within a year's time. The plan would include releasing an Ursa Major album with the material that was closest to completion, and a second Ursa Minor album later on. Plans continued to change, though; Ursa Major was originally slated to a fifteen track album released on June 23, 2009. When it was released, it ended up being an eleven-song and one instrumental album released on August 18, 2009. The album, their first in six years, was released under their own independent label, Mega Collider Records. Ursa Major debuted at number three on the Billboard 200, selling 49,000 copies. This made it the band's highest-charting album, albeit with sales figures that were the lowest since their debut album. Third Eye Blind topped the Billboard Rock Albums chart, Top Alternative Albums chart, and Top Digital Albums chart. Three singles were released - "Non-Dairy Creamer" from Red Star and "Don't Believe A Word" and "Bonfire" from Ursa Major, but all failed to place on any Billboard chart.

The band toured in support of Ursa Major throughout 2009. In early 2010, Fredianelli was fired from the band. Irish musician Kryz Reid replaced Fredianelli on guitar, while Third Eye Blind continued to tour in support the album in 2010, co-headlining The Bamboozle Roadshow between May and June 2010. Both Jenkins and Hargreaves continued to mention an Ursa Minor release, but the focus remained on touring, and the release would eventually be cancelled by Jenkins because of the involvement and subsequent departure of Fredianelli. Fredianelli sued Jenkins for over eight million dollars based on many claims of breach of contract and missing writing credits and money and royalties owed from it. Many of the claims were rejected because of Fredianelli's accusations contradicting the actual contract he signed from Jenkins and Godtland. Still, the claims of lost wages from touring were supported, awarding $448,000 to Fredianelli.

=== Dopamine: 2011–2015 ===
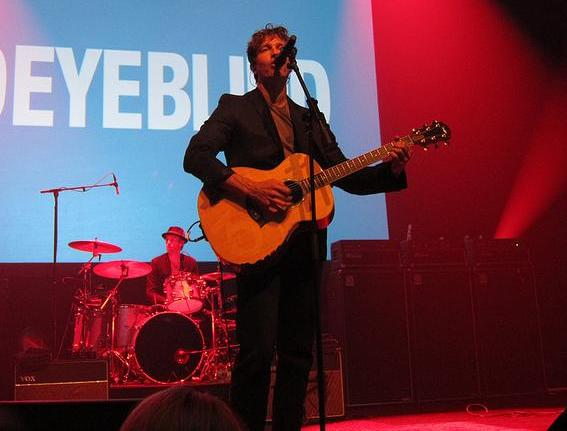
Third Eye Blind performing at The Moody Theater in 2012

The band again turned to extensive touring in the following years. In addition to Jenkins, Hargreaves, and newly recruited guitarist Reid, the band stopped relying on temporary studio and touring support for bass playing, and hiring a new permanent bassist, Alex LeCavalier. Additionally, for the first time, a fifth official member, Alex Kopp, was brought on as a dedicated keyboardist. Work on a fifth album continued, with earliest reports showing plans for a 2011 release, but writer's block continued to hamper Jenkins ability to complete lyrics for songs. The only newly recorded studio music the band would release for years was the impromptu-written "If There Ever Was a Time" song released in support of the Occupy Wall Street movement in November 2011. Moving into 2012, with writer's block continuing to hinder the process, Jenkins began to advertise the album as the band's last, feeling that the volume and structure of the album format was what made the writing process difficult for him. By the end of the year, the band did a short tour in India to help inspire the writing process; the band was far enough along to announce they were shooting a music video for a track. However, the album's release continued to be delayed from 2013 to 2014 to 2015. Writer's block continued to be cited as the reason by Jenkins, though Hargreaves noted that their past successes had afforded them the luxury of taking their time on material without having to rush it because of financial matters.

In May 2015, the band announced that their fifth studio album was completed, and on June 16, almost six years after their last album, the album, Dopamine, was released. The album debuted at No. 13 on the Billboard 200, selling just over 21,000 copies in its first week. Two singles were released - "Everything Is Easy" and "Get Me Out of Here" A non-album cover of Beyoncé song "Mine" was released to promote the album after live performances of the song received a warm reception in the touring leading up to the album's release.

=== We Are Drugs and Screamer: 2016–2019 ===
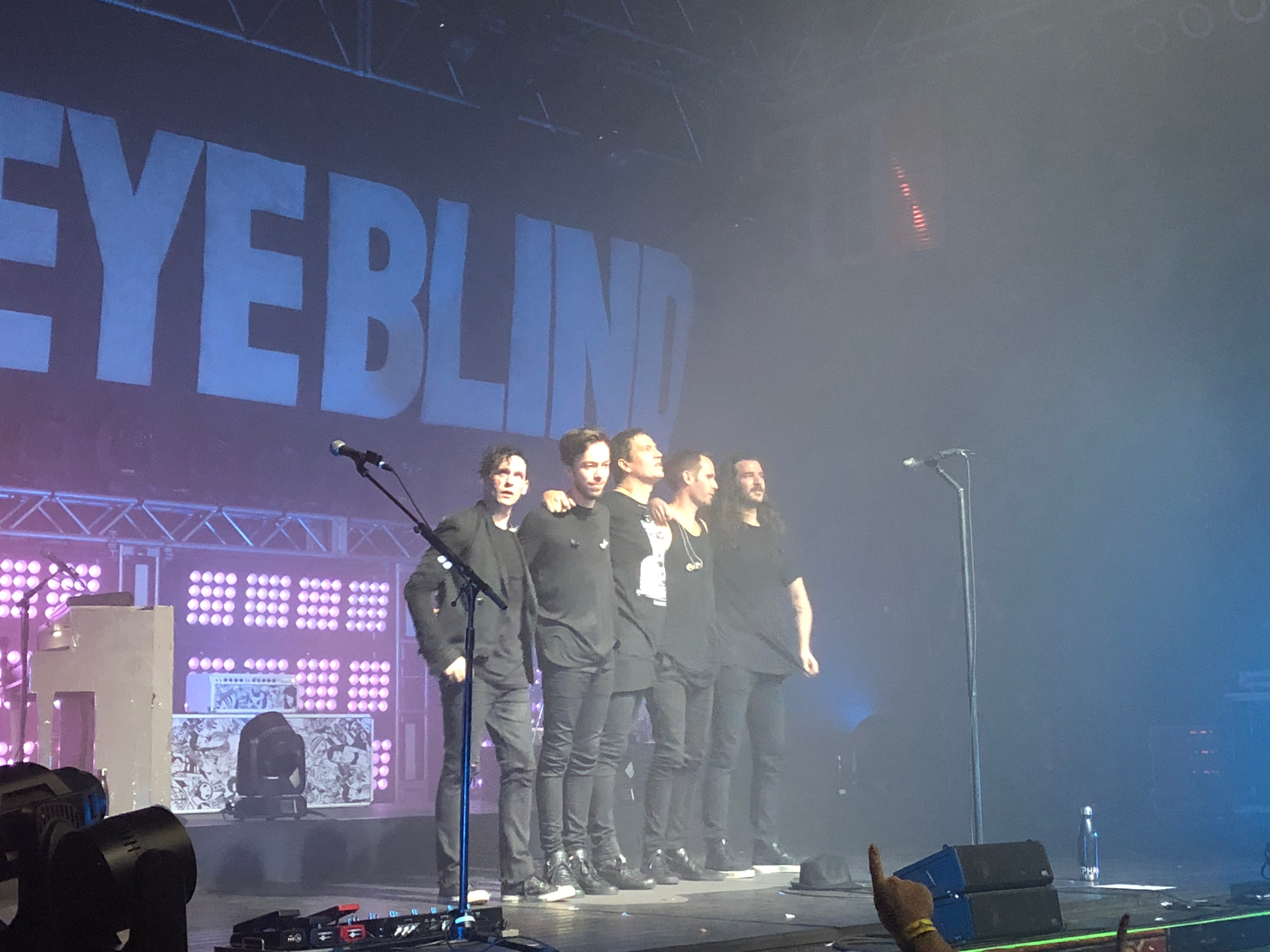
Third Eye Blind performing at the House of Blues in Orlando in October 2017

Following the release of Dopamine, the lineup of Jenkins, Hargreaves, Reid, LeCavelier, and Kopp experienced an increase in productivity not seen since the late 1990s. Jenkins announced plans for releasing an EP in 2016. On July 19, 2016, they played a benefit concert for Musicians on Call, a charity organization, in close proximity to the Republican National Convention. The band took the opportunity to speak out against the Republican Party, criticizing its views on science and LGBT rights, and playing tracks specifically critical of its stances, including "Jumper", and "Non-Dairy Creamer". The stunt received national coverage, and inspired the band to move forward with material. The EP, the seven track We Are Drugs, was released on October 7, 2016, just 16 months after the release of Dopamine. One single, the politically themed "Cop Vs. Phone Girl", was released from the EP.

Jenkins announced the next plans to release another EP titled Summer Gods in 2017 to coincide with a tour of the same name. With the EP not ready for release by the end of the tour, the idea was scrapped and the name was instead assigned to a live album release of performances from the tour. Some new music was still released in the year though, in the form of the twentieth anniversary release of their debut album. Newly recorded versions of old songs from the sessions were released, including a finalized version of the 1993 song "Alright Caroline". In June 2018, another EP was released - a collection of seven cover songs titled Thanks for Everything. Jenkins stated that the act of reinterpreting the cover songs of various genres inspired the band to create another full studio album in the process. Initially announced as another EP in late 2018, the project bloomed into the band's sixth studio album in 2019. The band continued to tour into 2019, including a major co-headlining North American tour with Jimmy Eat World from June to August, called Summer Gods Tour 2019. Prior to the tour, Kopp announced he was leaving the band to pursue other projects, He was replaced by Colin Creev. On October 18, 2019, the band released their sixth studio album, Screamer.

=== Our Bande Apart and upcoming eighth studio album: 2020–present ===
After releasing their sixth studio album Screamer, in October 2019, the band was able to complete the first leg of the tour supporting it, but was forced to cancel the second leg of it in 2020 because of the COVID-19 pandemic—the first time the band had to cancel a tour in 22 years according to Jenkins. The band instead performed live online streaming performances, and largely turned to writing more new music instead. Jenkins began writing in solitude during the initial wave of lockdowns, and began recording with the rest of the band as soon as the lockdowns ended.

On July 30, 2021, the band announced their seventh studio album, Our Bande Apart, would be released on September 24, 2021, and released the first single from it, "Box of Bones". A second song, "Again", was released ahead of the album on August 20, featuring Best Coast singer Bethany Cosentino. The band was able to tour again, in support of the album, in 2022, with a North American "Summer Gods" tour with Taking Back Sunday and Hockey Dad. The tour was advertised as a 25th anniversary tour, and the band's performance at Red Rocks Amphitheatre was recorded, eventually being released as a live album and concert film in 2024. In June 2022, the band released an acoustic album, Unplugged, which Jenkins described as "just basically any song that [he] wanted another try at." The band put on another North American tour across March and April 2023 as well; their performance in Montclair, New Jersey at the Wellmont Theater was taped for a PBS special, which aired in May.

In early 2024, a new iteration of the "Summer Gods" tour was announced, with the band touring with Yellowcard from June to August 2024. Jenkins also noted in March that the band was working on a new studio album, and that they wished to release new music prior to the tour, though he was not sure the whole album would be ready for release by then. New music did not release prior to the tour; Hargreaves noted that four to six songs were largely recorded since 2022, but still required Jenkins to finish writing and recording lyrics and vocals.

On March 13, 2025, the band released a new song "Like A Lullaby". The song was first performed during their Tiny Desk performance, which was released the same day. The track was co-produced by Jenkins and Eric Valentine, who produced the band's debut.

On January 1, 2026, the band headlined the halftime show at the 2026 Orange Bowl. The band is slated to make an appearance on the 2026 Vans Warped Tour.

== Musical style and influences ==
Third Eye Blind's musical style has been described as pop rock, alternative rock, post-grunge, pop-punk, and power pop. Jenkins noted that he was influenced by The Clash, Jane's Addiction, and Camper Van Beethoven. Hargreaves stated that his drumming style was influenced by the Ohio Players and James Brown.

== Members ==
Current members

- Stephan Jenkins – lead vocals, guitar (1993–present) keyboards (1999–present)
- Brad Hargreaves – drums, percussion (1995–present)
- Kryz Reid – guitar, backing vocals (2010–present)
- Alex LeCavalier – bass, backing vocals (2013–present)
- Colin Creev – keyboards, guitar, backing vocals (2019–present)

Former members

- Kevin Cadogan – guitar, backing vocals, keyboards (1993–2000)
- Jason Slater – bass, backing vocals (1993–1994)
- Adrian Burley – drums, percussion (1993–1994)
- Michael Urbano – drums, percussion (1994–1995)
- Arion Salazar – bass, backing vocals, guitar, piano (1994–2006)
- Steve Bowman – drums, percussion (1994)
- Tony Fredianelli – guitar, backing vocals, keyboards (2000–2010)
- Alex Kopp – keyboards, guitar, piano (2011–2019)

Former touring musicians

- Leo Kremer – bass, backing vocals (2006–2008)
- Abe Millett – bass, backing vocals, piano, keyboards (2008–2012)
- Jon Pancoast – bass, backing vocals (2012–2013)

== Awards ==
- 1997 – The band won a Billboard Music Award for Best Modern Rock Track ("Semi-Charmed Life").
- 1998 – At the California Music Awards, known as the Bammies and formerly the Bay Area Music Awards, Third Eye Blind won 3 awards (including Best Album, Best Songwriting, and Best Debut Work).
- 1998 – Jenkins and Cadogan won a California Music Award for Outstanding Songwriters.
- 1999 – Third Eye Blind were nominated for 2 American Music Awards for Favorite Pop/Rock New Artist and Favorite Alternative Artist.
- 1999 – Third Eye Blind won 3 California Music Awards for Outstanding Group, Outstanding Single ("Jumper") and Outstanding Artist of the Year (Stephan Jenkins).
- 2000 – Third Eye Blind were nominated for 7 California Music Awards.
- 2000 – Jenkins and Cadogan won a California Music Award for Outstanding Songwriters.

== Discography ==
Studio albums

- Third Eye Blind (1997)
- Blue (1999)
- Out of the Vein (2003)
- Ursa Major (2009)
- Dopamine (2015)
- Screamer (2019)
- Our Bande Apart (2021)
