= Stephan Jenkins =

American musician

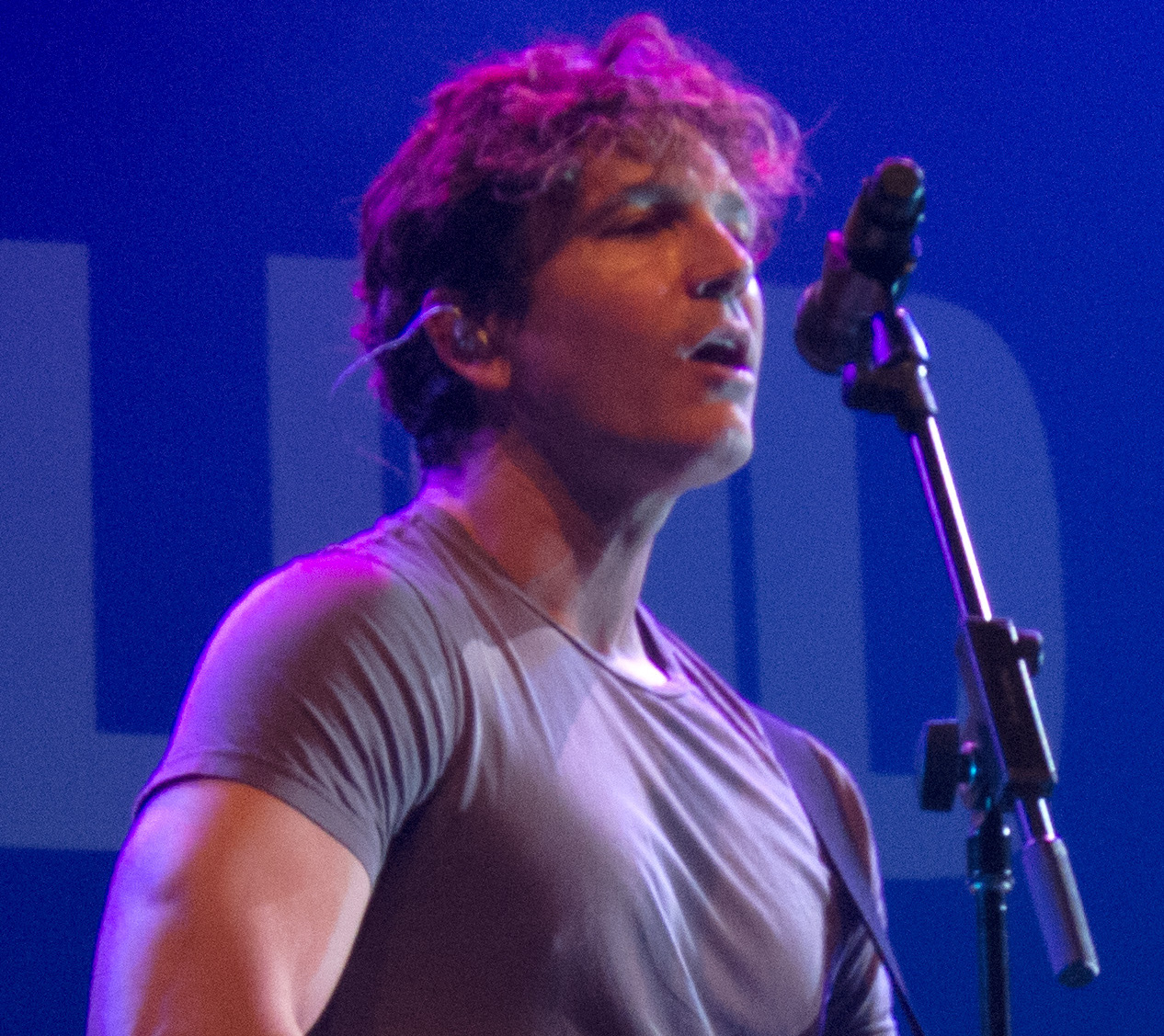
- Jenkins performing in 2012

Background information
- Born: September 27, 1964 (age 61); Indio, California, U.S.
- Genres: Alternative rock; pop rock
- Occupations: Singer; songwriter; record producer; actor
- Instruments: Vocals; guitar; keyboards; drums; percussion
- Years active: 1980s–present
- Member of: Third Eye Blind
- Formerly of: Puck and Natty
- Website: 3eb.com

Stephan Douglas Jenkins (/ˈstiːvən/ STEEV-ən) is an American singer, guitarist, and the frontman of the alternative rock band Third Eye Blind. He began his musical career in 1992 as part of the short-lived rap duo Puck and Natty, alongside Detroit rapper Herman Anthony Chunn. Following the breakup of the duo, Jenkins and guitarist Kevin Cadogan formed Third Eye Blind in 1993. The band released their eponymous debut studio album in 1997, which went multi-platinum in the United States. Since then, they have released nine more albums: Blue (1999), Out of the Vein (2003), Ursa Major (2009), Dopamine (2015), We Are Drugs (2016), Thanks for Everything (cover album) (2018), Screamer (2019), Our Bande Apart (2021), and Unplugged (2022). As part of Third Eye Blind, Jenkins has received one Billboard Music Award and eight California Music Awards.

Jenkins released a live album, Live at Amoeba, as a Record Store Day exclusive vinyl in 2016. Jenkins made his debut as a solo artist as a feature on Run-DMC's 2001 single "Rock Show". In the same year, he made his acting debut with a cameo in the film Rock Star. He also appeared in the television series All That (2003) and Punk'd (2005), in addition to pursuing his first lead role in the 2003 thriller Art of Revenge. As a producer, Jenkins helmed the production on albums by The Braids, Vanessa Carlton, and Spencer Barnett.

== Early life ==
Jenkins was born in Indio, California. Shortly after his birth, his family moved to Wisconsin where his father was a professor of political science at the University of Wisconsin-Milwaukee. They later moved to Palo Alto, California when Stephan was six. When he was seven years old, his parents divorced. His mother became an alcoholic. During elementary school, he was diagnosed with dyslexia. He had to repeat first grade due to his struggles with literacy. His father, who worked as a professor at Stanford and then the University of California, Berkeley, would help him with his dyslexia. He attended Henry M. Gunn Senior High School and graduated in 1983. Jenkins got interested in music early in life. He recalls creating original musical works at the age of five using pots and pans on the floor of his kitchen at home in northern California. In 1987, he graduated from University of California, Berkeley, with a Bachelor of Arts in English literature.

Jenkins began musical work as a drummer. During high school, he performed with Fast Forward, consisting of Jenkins on drums, Nick Dement (guitar), Ben Austin (bass), and Greg Magel (guitar). Though the precocious Jenkins was still in high school, the other three were students at neighboring Stanford University. With the breakup of Fast Forward, Austin and Magel departed; Jenkins and Dement added new bassist Scott Lockhart and formed the trio Splash. Stanford University student Lawrence Schoeffler made a music video for their song "Suzaie" as part of his graduate portfolio in film production, which was broadcast on MTV Basement Tapes (1983) and won a bronze medal at the International Film & TV Festival of New York.

== Puck and Natty ==
Jenkins then formed Puck and Natty (the name originating with the Shakespeare characters, but also serving as a playful poke at a well-known Bay Area jazz duo, Tuck & Patti), a 'funky rap masta' group, with Detroit rapper Herman Anthony Chunn in 1992. Puck and Natty was short lived; however, their track, "Just Wanna Be Your Friend" landed on a soundtrack album of the hit TV show Beverly Hills, 90210 in 1992. In a 1999 interview with the San Francisco Chronicle, Jenkins provided a synopsis of the way things went down. "'You want me to do a song for your TV show that I've never seen? No problem,' recalled Jenkins. 'It was $7,800. I bought groceries.'" The duo later changed their name to Puck & Zen because of a complaint from the jazz duo, Tuck & Patti.

== Third Eye Blind and mainstream success ==
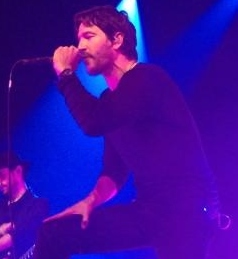
Jenkins in 2013

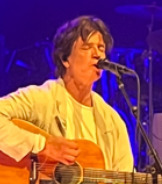
Jenkins in 2023

Jenkins formed Third Eye Blind in 1993 with Kevin Cadogan. They played small gigs around the San Francisco Bay Area for years and were, for the most part, unknown until they were signed in 1996 by Elektra Records. The band's deal with Elektra was later reported as the largest publishing deal ever for a previously unsigned artist. Jenkins has written or co-written every song on the band's five studio albums and one EP. Jenkins won two California Music Awards for Best Songwriter along with bandmate Cadogan; in addition, he was nominated three years in a row as Best Vocalist and won Artist of the Year.

== Other work ==
=== Producing ===
Jenkins has produced for Third Eye Blind and several music artists. In 1997, he co-produced Third Eye Blind's self-titled debut studio album with Eric Valentine. The duo also helmed production on The Braids' debut studio album, Here We Come (1999). He co-produced follow-up Blue (1999) and Out of the Vein (2003) with Arion Salazar and Third Eye Blind, while acting as the sole producer on Ursa Major (2009), Dopamine (2015), and We Are Drugs (2016). In 2004, Jenkins co-wrote four songs for and produced Vanessa Carlton's second studio album, Harmonium. He co-wrote five songs for Carlton's follow-up, Heroes & Thieves (2007), in addition to co-producing the effort with Irv Gotti and Linda Perry. In 2015, Jenkins produced Spencer Barnett's extended play, 13 Summers In. In 2020, Jenkins co-wrote Blackbear's "I Feel Bad".

=== Acting ===
Jenkins made his acting debut with a cameo in the film Rock Star (2001) playing Bradley, the lead singer of the fictional band Black Babylon. He has also appeared in the former Nickelodeon series All That, and he appeared on the MTV candid camera show Punk'd when Vanessa Carlton was the subject of one of Ashton Kutcher's practical jokes. He also starred as the lead role in the 2003 independent thriller, Art of Revenge.

== Personal life ==
Jenkins was diagnosed with chronic fatigue syndrome preceding the 1997 release of Third Eye Blind.

Jenkins was in a three-year relationship with actress Charlize Theron until October 2001. Some of Third Eye Blind's third album, Out of the Vein, explores the emotions Jenkins experienced as a result of their breakup. From 2002 to 2007, Jenkins dated Vanessa Carlton.

When asked about living as a high-profile musician, he stated "Am I a rock star? Yeah, I guess. I also get to live in North Beach and go to a pub and drink my pint and go to a café and drink my coffee. I carry groceries home on the tank of my motorcycle. I find pleasure in things that are simple. Is that a rock star's life? It is for me."

Jenkins is a supporter of the Black Lives Matter movement. He is an advocate for gay rights, stating that he was influenced by queer culture in San Francisco. In 2016, Jenkins voiced support for Hillary Clinton in the 2016 U.S. presidential election.

In 2024, he put his San Francisco house on the market for $3.6 million.

== Discography ==
=== Live albums ===
| Title | Details |
|---|---|
| Live at Amoeba | Released: April 16, 2016; Label: MRI; Format: LP |

=== Guest appearances ===
| Title | Year | Other performer(s) | Album |
|---|---|---|---|
| "Rock Show" | 2001 | Run-DMC | Crown Royal |
