= Water from Your Eyes discography =

Indie pop band

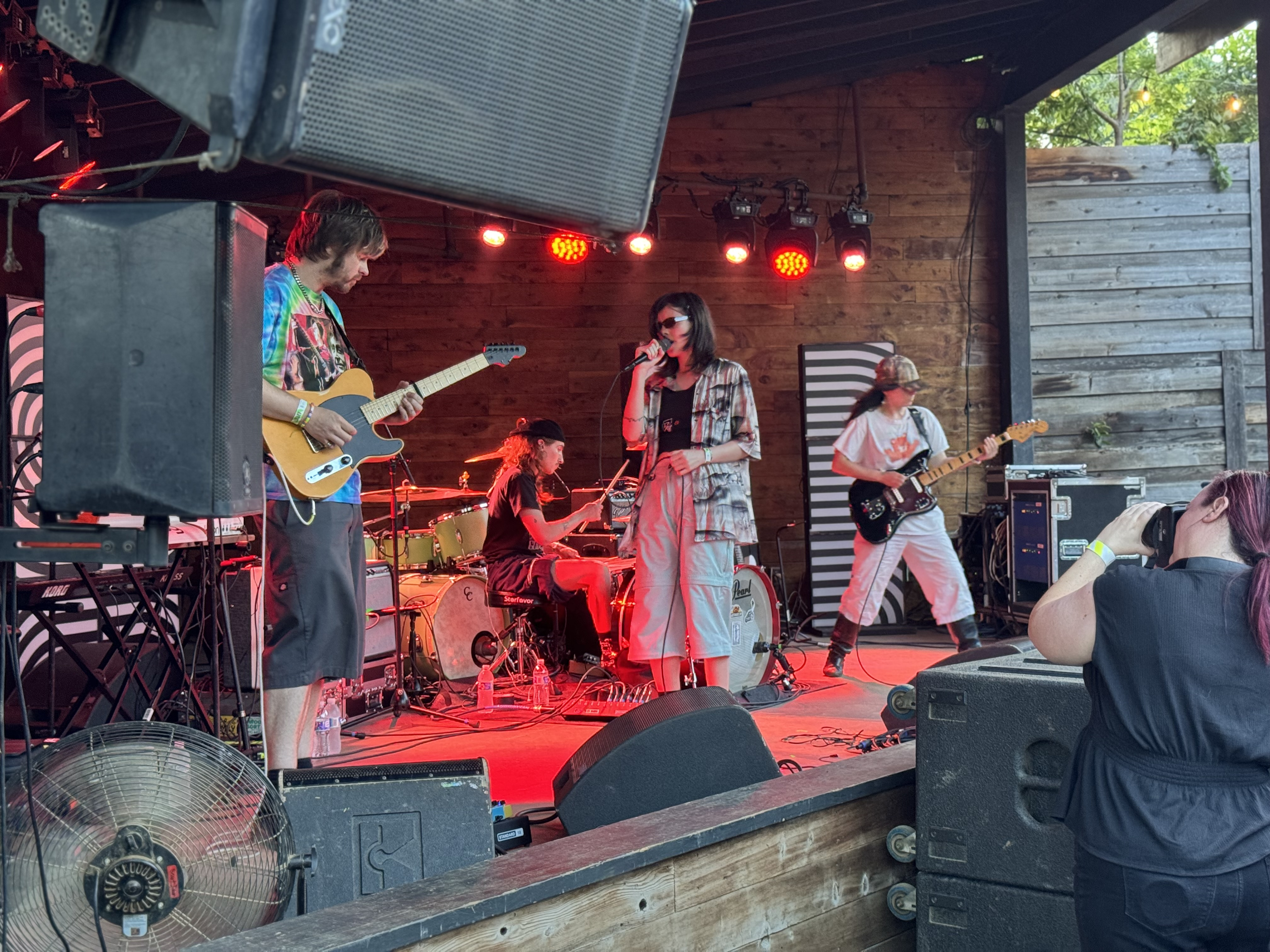
- Studio albums: 7
- EPs: 5
- Remix albums: 1
- Singles: 12
- Promotional singles: 3
- Music videos: 10

Water from Your Eyes is an American indie pop band originating from Chicago, Illinois. Water from Your Eyes has released seven studio albums, five extended plays (EPs), one remix album, 12 singles, three promotional singles and ten music videos. Water from Your Eyes would later relocate to Brooklyn, New York. They released their debut studio album album Long Days, No Dreams in 2017 through Sooper Records. A year later, in 2018, the duo released their second album titled All a Dance, with a theme described from the viewpoint of side characters. The duo released their third album Somebody Else's Song in 2019, which received a generally positive review from Pitchfork. The band would later release Structure (2021).

In 2022, Al Nardo joined as second guitarist, followed by Bailey Wollowitz as drummer in 2023. Water from Your Eyes had signed with Matador Records in 2023 and recorded their sixth album Everyone's Crushed, later releasing it in May 2023. They would later release a remix version titled Crushed by Everyone in November 2023. In August 2025, their seventh album It's a Beautiful Place would be released.

== Albums ==
=== Studio albums ===
List of studio albums, with selected chart positions
Title	Album details	Peak chart positions		
Title	Album details	Scottish Albums	UK Indie	UK Downloads
Somebody Else's Song	Released: October 25, 2019; Label: Exploding in Sound; Format: Digital download, streaming	—	—	—
Structure	Released: August 27, 2021; Label: Wharf Cat Records; Format: CD, digital download, LP, streaming	—	—	—
Everyone's Crushed	Released: May 26, 2023; Label: Matador Records; Format: CD, digital download, LP, streaming	—	—	—
It's a Beautiful Place	Released: August 22, 2025; Label: Matador; Formats: CD, digital download, LP, streaming	74	21	53

=== Remix albums ===
Title	EP details
Crushed by Everyone	Released: November 17, 2023; Label: Matador; Format: Digital download, streaming

== Extended plays ==
Title	EP details
All a Dance	Released: January 19, 2018; Label: Exploding in Sound; Format: Digital download, streaming
MP3 Player 1	Released: July 12, 2024; Label: Matador; Format: Digital download, streaming
It's Beautiful	Released: December 3, 2025; Label: Matador; Format: Digital download, streaming

== Singles ==
Title	Year	Album
"Quotations"	2021	Structure
"Track Five"	2021	Structure
"When You're Around"	2021	Non-album single
"Barley"	2023	Everyone's Crushed
"True Life"	2023	Everyone's Crushed
"14"	2023	Everyone's Crushed
"Warm Storm"	2024	Non-album single
"The Good Ship Lifestyle"	2024	MP3 Player 1
"Life Signs"	2025	It's a Beautiful Place
"Playing Classics"	2025	It's a Beautiful Place
"Nights in Armor"	2025	It's a Beautiful Place

== Music videos ==
Song	Year	Director	Ref
"Barley"	2023	Rachel Brown	
"Life Signs"	2025	Rachel Brown	
"Playing Classics"	2025	James Dayton	
"Nights in Armor"	2025	Jo Shaffer	
