= MP3 Player 1 =

EP by Water from Your Eyes
- Released: July 12, 2024
- Recorded: 2023
- Length: 14:46
- Label: Matador
- Producer: Nate Amos

Water from Your Eyes chronology
Everyone's Crushed (2023)	MP3 Player 1 (2024)	It's a Beautiful Place (2025)

Singles from MP3 Player 1
- 1. "The Good Ship Lifestyle" Released: July 9, 2024

MP3 Player 1 is a cover extended play (EP) by American indie pop band Water from Your Eyes, released on July 12, 2024 through Matador Records. Consisting of four tracks and a duration of around fourteen minutes, it was entirely produced by Nate Amos. The EP was co-written by Amos and Brown after the release of their sixth album, Everyone's Crushed (2023).

The single "The Good Ship Lifestyle," a cover of Chumbawamba's song of the same name preceded MP3 Player 1 on July 9, 2024, three days before the EP was released.

== Background and recording ==
MP3 Player 1 was recorded around the same time as Everyone's Crushed (2023), according to Nate Amos and Rachel Brown, and acts the follow up to their earlier EP Somebody Else's Song (2019). Consisting of four tracks that are covers of songs by Chumbawamba, Adele, Al Green and Third Eye Blind, it has a runtime of around fourteen minutes.

== Critical reception ==
David Renshaw of The Fader would write that the EP is "playful" and "free like a good time at the karaoke bar". Renshaw would feel that the album "maintains both the stoner humor and disorientingly addictive take on DIY indie rock that made Everyone’s Crushed a breakout album". Caroline Nieto of Post-Trash said the album "portrays an erratic picture of the band's identity when they're not the writers, instead putting their style on display."

== Track listing ==
No.	Title	Writer(s)	Producer(s)	Length
1.	"The Good Ship Lifestyle"	Anne Holden; Duncan Bruce; James Darren Hamer; Judith Abbott; Louise Watts; Mark Allan Whalley; Nigel Hunter; Paul Alexis Greco	Nate Amos	4:06
2.	"Someone Like You"	Adele Adkins; Dan Wilson	Amos	3:45
3.	"Tired of Being Alone"	Al Green	Amos	2:47
4.	"Motorcycle Drive By"	Kevin Rene Cadogan; Arion Gabriel Salazar; Stephan Douglas Jenkins	Amos	4:08
Total length:				14:46

Notes

- "The Good Ship Lifestyle" is a cover of "The Good Ship Lifestyle" written by Chumbawamba.
- "Someone Like You" is a cover of "Someone like You" written by Adele.
- "Tired of Being Alone" is a cover of "Tired of Being Alone" written by Al Green.
- "Motorcycle Drive By" is a cover of "Motorcycle Drive By" written by Third Eye Blind.

== Personnel ==
Credits adapted from Tidal.

- Rachel Brown – vocals
- Nate Amos – vocals (2), production
- JJ Golden – mastering engineer
- Louis Watts – songwriting (1)
- Judith Abbott – songwriting (1)
- Mark Allan Whalley – songwriting (1)
- Anne Holden – songwriting (1)
- Duncan Bruce – songwriting (1)
- Nigel Hunter – songwriting (1)
- Paul Alexis Greco – songwriting (1)
- James Darren Hamer – songwriting (1)
- Adele Adkins – songwriting (2)
- Al Green – songwriting (3)
- Kevin Rene Cadogan – songwriting (4)
- Arion Gabriel Salazar – songwriting (4)
- Stephan Douglas Jenkins – songwriting (4)

== Release history ==
Release dates and formats for MP3 Player 1
Region	Date	Format(s)	Label	Ref.
Various	July 12, 2024	Digital download; streaming	Matador Records	
