= It's Beautiful (EP) =

EP by Water from Your Eyes
- Released: December 3, 2025
- Length: 17:27
- Label: Matador Records
- Producer: Nate Amos

Water from Your Eyes chronology
It's a Beautiful Place (2025)	It's Beautiful (2025)

It's Beautiful is the third extended play (EP) by the American indie pop band Water from Your Eyes. It was released by Matador Records on December 3, 2025. Consisting of three tracks and a duration of around seventeen minutes, it was entirely produced by Nate Amos. After recording music in Amos' bedroom for their studio album It's a Beautiful Place (2025), they would embark on a tour for the album. During the European leg of the tour, the band would release a three track EP featuring reworked versions of their previous songs, “Born 2,” “Nights in Armor,” and “Playing Classics”.

== Background and composition ==
Water from Your Eyes released their debut studio album, It's a Beautiful Place (2025), to critical acclaim. The EP was surprise-released on December 3, 2025 through Matador during the European leg for the band's It's a Beautiful Place Tour. It features the reworks of 3 tracks from the band's previous successful album It's a Beautiful Place (2025), “Born 2,” “Nights in Armor,” and “Playing Classics”. Amos would state: “The new versions of ‘Born 2’ and ‘Nights in Armor’ are actually just closer to how the songs existed in their original form”. Further going into detail, “People were asking me about the original 10+ minute version of playing classics and I can’t find it anymore, so I made a new one. Thought it would be funny if it was faster, too. I added car sound effects because cars are fast.”

== Release and promotion ==
In August 2025, Water from Your Eyes would release their seventh studio album It's a Beautiful Place (2025), subsequently announcing a new project. During the European leg for the It's a Beautiful Place Tour, Water from Your Eyes would reveal a new extended play (EP) on December 3.

== Critical reception ==
Abby Jones writing for Stereogum felt the reworked versions of the songs were "expectedly sick".

== Track listing ==
No.	Title	Length
1.	"Born 4"	4:41
2.	"Nights In Armor (FKA Love Song)"	2:10
3.	"Driving Classics, Playing Cars"	10:35

== Personnel ==
Credits adapted from Tidal.

- Nate Amos – songwriting, production, engineering
- Rachel Brown – songwriting
- JJ Golden – mastering, engineering
