= Rachel Brown (musician) =

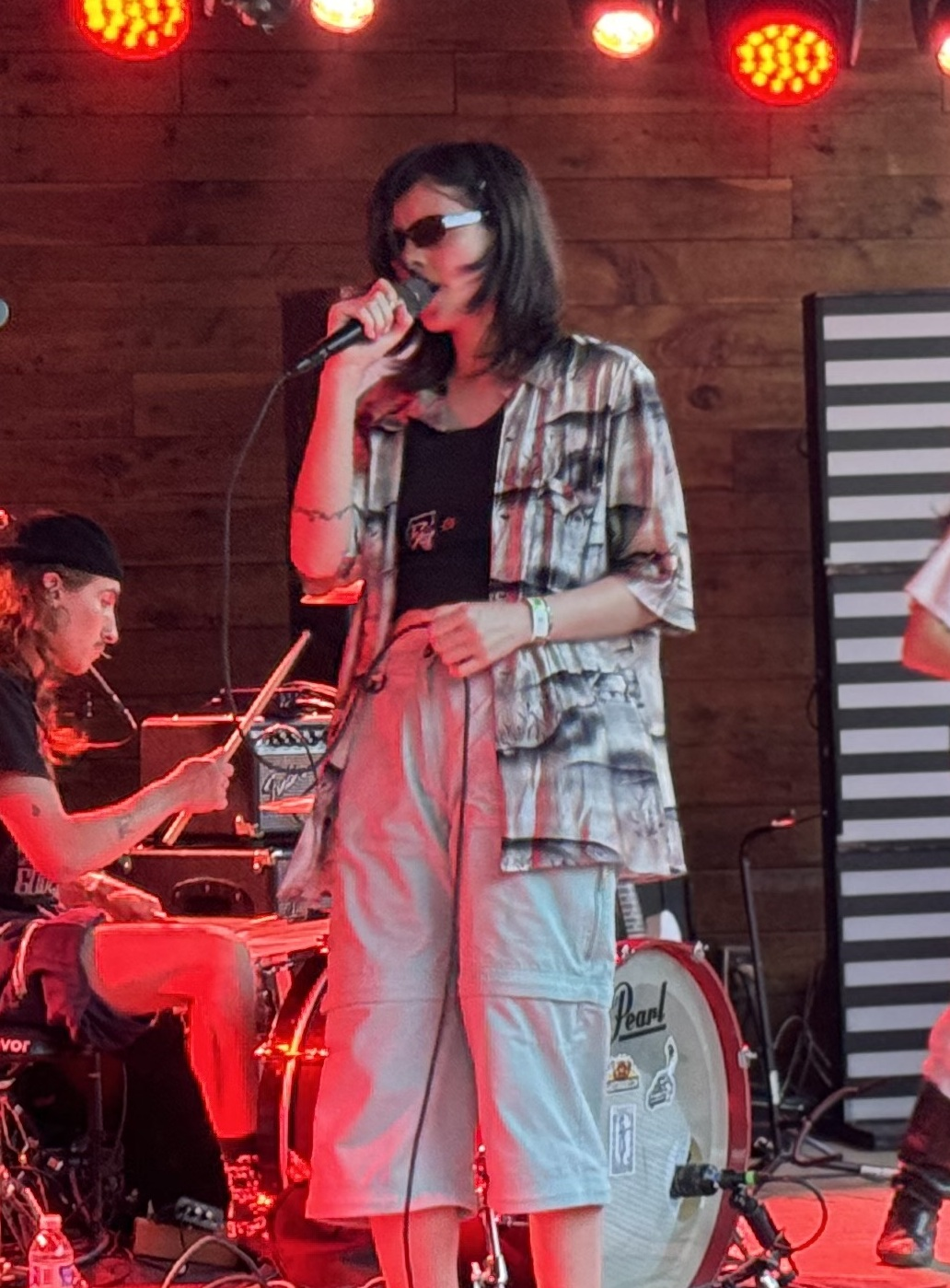
- Brown playing with Water from Your Eyes in 2024
- Occupations: Musician; singer; songwriter; record producer
- Years active: 2015–present
- Musical career
- Origin: Chicago, Illinois, U.S.
- Genres: Indie pop; indie rock; dream pop; experimental pop; lo-fi
- Instruments: Vocals; guitar
- Label: Danger Collective Records
- Member of: Water from Your Eyes
- Website: www.heretonetwork.com

Rachel Brown, also known as Thanks for Coming, is an American musician, and singer. They are the lead vocalist of indie pop band Water from Your Eyes.

== Life and career ==
Brown is from Chicago, and resides in New York City. They are of Chinese American and Irish Catholic ancestry. They began recording as Thanks for Coming (stylized in all lowercase) in 2015, while still attending high school in Chicago.

Brown graduated in 2019 with a Bachelor of Fine Arts in Film and Television from New York University.

Brown is non-binary and uses they/them pronouns.

Brown was in a relationship with musician MJ Lenderman starting in 2024. The two broke up in November 2025.

== Discography ==
thanks for coming

- attic (2012)
- therapy session (2013)
- i have to go to work today ep (2014)
- thank you (2015)
- r u sad? bc i am (2015)
- i'm so sick bruh (2015)
- say it 2 my b*tch (2015)
- down comforter blues (2015)
- flowers r cool, love is dumb (2015)
- empty parking lots (2015)
- if you're reading this i am drakechel (2015)
- let's pretend our feelings don't exist (2015)
- any party's tonight (2015)
- drunk & on the floor (2015)
- i don't care but u know i'm lying (2015)
- dude just shut up (2015)
- yoooooo (a selected discography) (2015)
- i h8 college (2015)
- i don't want to do my homework ep (2015)
- the east river told me to drown (2015)
- dance bc yr sad (2015)
- well yr gone again (2015)
- favorite songs//people (2015)
- i just want to get high & die (2015)
- the aftermath of happiness (2015)
- i'll sleep when i want (2016)
- drakechel in: hotline bling (2016)
- brand new anxiety (2016)

Water from Your Eyes

- Long Days, No Dreams (self-released, 2017)
- Somebody Else's Song (Exploding in Sound, 2019)
- Somebody Else's Songs (self-released, 2021)
- Structure (Wharf Cat, 2021)
- Everyone's Crushed (Matador, 2023)
- It's a Beautiful Place (Matador, 2025)
