= How's It Going to Be =

1997 single by Third Eye Blind

Single by Third Eye Blind

from the album Third Eye Blind
- B-side: "Horror Show"; "Semi-Charmed Life"
- Released: October 20, 1997
- Studio: Toast; Skywalker Ranch; H.O.S. (San Francisco)
- Genre: Alternative rock
- Length: 4:13
- Label: Elektra
- Songwriters: Stephan Jenkins; Kevin Cadogan
- Producers: Stephan Jenkins; Eric Valentine; Ren Klyce

Third Eye Blind singles chronology
"Graduate" (1997)	"How's It Going to Be" (1997)	"Losing a Whole Year" (1997)

Music video
- "How's It Going to Be" on YouTube

"How's It Going to Be" is a song by the American rock band Third Eye Blind from their debut album Third Eye Blind (1997). It was released to radio as the third single from the album on October 20, 1997, by Elektra Records. Frontman Stephan Jenkins and guitarist Kevin Cadogan are credited as writers of the song. Production on the song was helmed by Jenkins, Eric Valentine, and Ren Klyce, with additional production and arrangement by Arion Salazar and Cadogan. According to Jenkins, the song is about the end of a relationship and the transition to acquaintanceship.

The song was recorded in and around San Francisco at Toast Studios, Skywalker Ranch, and H.O.S. by Valentine. Tom Lord-Alge was responsible for the mixing of the track, which was made at South Beach Studios in Miami Beach. "How's It Going to Be" was one of the first demos recorded for Third Eye Blind, being recorded alongside the first iteration of "Semi-Charmed Life". The song's concept was developed after Cadogan played an autoharp, which inspired feelings of nostalgia among the band members. The instrumentation used in the song also includes guitars, drums, and a cello.

"How's It Going to Be" received positive reviews from music critics, who praised Cadogan's distinct use of an autoharp in the instrumentation. The song peaked at number nine on the US Billboard Hot 100, giving Third Eye Blind their second entry on the chart and their second top-10 hit. Internationally, "How's It Going to Be" was a top-40 hit in three countries. On the 1998 year-end charts, the song peaked at number 67 on the Canadian RPM 100 Hit Tracks chart and number 11 on the US Billboard Hot 100 chart.

== Writing and inspiration ==
"How's It Going to Be" was written by Stephan Jenkins and Kevin Cadogan. In an interview with Jenkins published in Billboard, he explained:

The song’s inspiration came about when Third Eye guitarist Kevin Cadogan was tinkering around with an autoharp, ‘which is a vintage-sounding instrument that you can’t really play without it having a sort of nostalgic sound to it. That inspired this emotional condition in me,’ Jenkins says. That condition surrounds the idea of lost love, of realizing that there may come a despairing day when the two meet and no longer know each other. ‘I think we all feel violated when we find that a relationship actually has time limits, that it’s not unconditional. That’s the thing that aches in people,’ he explains. ‘That’s something everybody can relate to, even when you know you have no business being with this person anymore.’

== Recording and mixing ==
The recording sessions for "How's It Going to Be" took place in and around San Francisco, California at Toast Studios, Skywalker Ranch, and H.O.S. Production on the song was helmed by Jenkins, Eric Valentine, and Ren Klyce, with additional production and arrangement by Arion Salazar and Kevin Cadogan. The song was engineered by David Gleeson, with additional engineering by Valentine. Tom Lord-Alge was responsible for the mixing of the track, which was made at South Beach Studios in Miami Beach, Florida.

== Composition ==
"How's It Going to Be"
A 29-second sample of Third Eye Blind's "How's It Going to Be" song where the bridge is played.

"How's It Going to Be" is an alternative rock song. According to the sheet music published at Musicnotes.com by Alfred Publishing, the song is written in the key of F major and is set in time signature of common time with a tempo of 78 beats per minute. Jenkin's vocal range spans one octave, from C_{4} to A_{5}.

== Critical reception ==
Arielle Gordon of Pitchfork praised Kevin Cadogan's use of an autoharp on the song's opening chords.

== Chart performance ==
In the United States, "How's It Going to Be" debuted at number 36 on the Billboard Hot 100 chart for the issue dated December 6, 1997. The song reached its peak after eleven weeks, peaking at number nine for the issue dated February 14, 1998. The song spent a total of fifty-two weeks on the chart, with the week of November 28, 1998, being its final appearance on the chart.

== Music video ==
The music video was directed by Nigel Dick and was filmed in 1997 on September 6 and 7 on Spring Street, Los Angeles. In the video, the band members are in a car parked on a city street. On the opposite sidewalk, they spot a woman carrying many items (implied as an ex-girlfriend) enter a nearby building and immediately bring their instruments inside. They follow her to her office. As the band performs in front of the office, the woman hides behind a divider as another employee calls building security.

== Live performances ==
The song was regularly performed on Third Eye Blind's debut headlining tour, The Bonfire Tour (1998).

== Cover versions ==
In 2011, P.T. Walkley sang a cover of this song for the romantic film Something Borrowed.

In 2015, American indie rock band Widowspeak released a cover of "How's It Going to Be" on their single Two Covers.

== Track listings and formats ==
- US and Australian CD, US cassette
1. "How's It Going to Be" – 4:16
2. "Horror Show" – 4:10
- European maxi and French CD 1
1. "How's It Going to Be" – 4:13
2. "Graduate" (Remix) – 3:25
3. "Horror Show" – 4:10
- French CD 2
1. "How's It Going to Be" – 4:12
2. "Semi-Charmed Life" – 4:27
3. "Horror Show" – 4:10

== Credits and personnel ==
Credits and personnel are adapted from Third Eye Blind album liner notes.

- Stephan Jenkins – vocals, producer
- Kevin Cadogan – guitar, vocals, autoharp
- Arion Salazar – bass, vocals
- Michael Urbano – drums
- Ari Gorman – cello
- Eric Valentine – engineer, producer
- Ren Klyce – producer

== Charts ==
=== Weekly charts ===
Weekly chart performance for "How It's Going to Be"
Chart (1997–1998)	Peak position
Australia (ARIA)	93
Canada Top Singles (RPM)	6
Canada Rock/Alternative (RPM)	4
Iceland (Íslenski Listinn Topp 40)	32
Scottish Singles Sales (Official Charts)	47
UK Singles (Official Charts)	51
US Billboard Hot 100	9
US Adult Alternative Airplay (Billboard)	6
US Adult Pop Airplay (Billboard)	5
US Alternative Airplay (Billboard)	5
US Pop Airplay (Billboard)	14

=== Year-end charts ===
Year-end chart performance for "How It's Going to Be"
Chart (1998)	Position
Canada Top Singles (RPM)	67
US Billboard Hot 100	11
US Adult Top 40 (Billboard)	14
US Mainstream Top 40 (Billboard)	34
US Modern Rock Tracks (Billboard)	15
US Triple-A (Billboard)	21

== Certifications ==
Certifications and sales for "How's It Going to Be"
Region	Certification	Certified units/sales
New Zealand (RMNZ)	Gold	15,000^{‡}
United States (RIAA)	2× Platinum	2,000,000^{‡}
^{‡} Sales+streaming figures based on certification alone.

== Release history ==
Release history and formats for "How It's Going to Be"
Region	Date	Format(s)	Label(s)	Ref.
United States	October 20, 1997	Alternative radio	Elektra	
United States	October 21, 1997	Contemporary hit radio	Elektra	
United States	November 1997	CD; cassette	Elektra	
United Kingdom	March 9, 1998	CD; cassette	Elektra	
