= Box for Buddy, Box for Star =

Studio album by This Is Lorelei
- Released: June 14, 2024
- Recorded: Mid-2022
- Genre: Indie rock
- Length: 42:20
- Label: Double Double Whammy
- Producer: Nate Amos

This Is Lorelei chronology
Falls Like Water Falls (2022)	Box for Buddy, Box for Star (2024)	Holo Boy (2025)

Singles from Box For Buddy, Box For Star
- 1. "Dancing in the Club" Released: March 4, 2024; 2. "I'm All Fucked Up" Released: April 17, 2024; 3. "Where's Your Love Now" Released: May 15, 2024; 4. "Perfect Hand" Released: June 12, 2024

Box for Buddy, Box for Star is a 2024 studio album by indie rock artist Nate Amos, of the band Water from Your Eyes, recording as This Is Lorelei. The album has received positive reviews from critics. It is the first release under this moniker that Amos has prepared as a traditional album release, including distribution by Double Double Whammy and a renewed focus on music-making after getting sober.

== Critical reception ==
Professional ratings
Review scores
Source	Rating
Paste	8.4/10
Pitchfork	7.8/10
Under the Radar	8.5/10 stars

Box for Buddy, Box for Star was shortlisted at BrooklynVegan as one of the most notable of the week, where Amanda Hatfield wrote that "[Amos'] solo work has veered in different sonic directions, and this time he's fully in singer-songwriter mode", comparing the music to Elliott Smith and Neutral Milk Hotel. Editors at Paste chose Box for Buddy, Box for Star as a Paste Pick and critic Sam Rosenberg scored it an 8.4 out of 10, writing that "the endless exuberance and unpredictability that define Amos's style are especially prominent on his latest record" and that with this album, "Amos unlocks the key to his creative potential, drawing from the archive of great American sounds and songwriting and filtering what he discovers through his special, singular lens". Editors at Pitchfork included this among the best albums of the week and scored this release 7.8 out of 10; critic Marissa Lorusso praised the variety of musical influences, from bluegrass to pop, as well as "plaintive lyrics about romance and heartache [that] have a surprisingly straightforward emotional quality". Claire Brown of WXPN saw this music as a mix of heartland rock and hyperpop that "is the work of an auteur; the product of someone who knows how to use the studio as an instrument, sure, but also knows how to use their own guitar and voice as one".

"I was writing tons of stuff, and the songs that I liked more were the ones that ended up being more brutal self-examinations. That seemed to be where I was getting the most catharsis out of the situation."

— Nate Amos on Box for Buddy, Box for Star being "a recovery album" and writing music while sober.

== Box for Buddy, Box for Star (Super Deluxe) ==
On March 9, 2026, a "super deluxe" version of the album was announced that would feature both new and previously released covers of songs from the original album. The version also contains the original tracks, thereby serving as a double album. It was released on April 17, 2026.

== Track listing ==
All tracks are written by Nate Amos.

No.	Title	Length
1.	"Angel's Eye"	3:51
2.	"Perfect Hand"	4:08
3.	"I'm All Fucked Up"	4:33
4.	"Dancing in the Club"	4:47
5.	"My Boy Limbo"	2:36
6.	"Where's Your Love Now"	6:10
7.	"Box for Buddy, Box for Star"	3:37
8.	"A Song That Sings About You"	3:21
9.	"Two Legs"	4:09
10.	"An Extra Beat For You and Me"	5:08
Total length:		42:20

Super Deluxe CD 2
No.	Title	Length
11.	"Angel's Eye (Bob and Sarah Amos Version)"	3:50
12.	"Perfect Hand (Power Snatch Version)"	3:33
13.	"I'm All Fucked Up (SASAMI Version)"	4:11
14.	"Dancing in the Club (MJ Lenderman Version)"	4:58
15.	"My Boy Limbo (fantasy of a broken heart Version) (featuring Jeff Tweedy)"	3:19
16.	"Where's Your Love Now (Waxahatchee Version)"	5:21
17.	"Box for Buddy, Box for Star (Lucy (Cooper B. Handy) Version)"	3:43
18.	"A Song That Sings About You (Momma Version)"	3:25
19.	"Two Legs (Snail Mail Version)"	4:11
20.	"An Extra Beat For You and Me (Tim Heidecker Version)"	5:18
Total length:		41:19

== Personnel ==
- Nate Amos – instrumentation, vocals, production
- Chris Adams – layout
- Al Nardo – photography
- Howie Weinberg – audio mastering
