= Losing a Whole Year =

1997 single by Third Eye Blind

Single by Third Eye Blind

from the album Third Eye Blind
- B-side: "Horror Show"
- Released: December 15, 1997
- Studio: Toast; Skywalker Ranch; H.O.S. (San Francisco)
- Genre: Alternative rock; shoegaze
- Length: 3:21 (album version); 3:18 (single version)
- Label: Elektra
- Songwriters: Stephan Jenkins; Kevin Cadogan
- Producers: Stephan Jenkins; Eric Valentine

Third Eye Blind singles chronology
"How's It Going to Be" (1997)	"Losing a Whole Year" (1997)	"Jumper" (1998)

Music video
- "Losing a Whole Year" on YouTube

"Losing a Whole Year" is a song by American rock band Third Eye Blind from their eponymous debut studio album (1997). Elektra Records released the song in Japan as the album's second single on December 15, 1997, and in the United States on February 23, 1998, as the album's fourth single. The song was written by frontman Stephan Jenkins and guitarist Kevin Cadogan, while production was helmed by Jenkins and Eric Valentine. According to Jenkins, the song is about lamentation due to the end of a relationship.

The song was recorded in and around San Francisco at Toast Studios, Skywalker Ranch, and H.O.S. by Valentine. Tom Lord-Alge was responsible for the mixing of the track, which was made at South Beach Studios in Miami Beach. An alternative rock song, the song's concept was quickly developed after a band member jokingly used the phrase "losing a whole beer." The instrumentation used in the song includes guitars, drums, and percussion. Third Eye Blind initially planned to release the song as their debut single, although they opted for "Semi-Charmed Life" at the suggestion of Elektra Records.

== Background ==
"I'm really proud of my contributions to the different voices on the guitar on that one. I just messed around and got these chords that would made this lush sound. I had this little Tascam four-track and we were at Stephan's having some beers and working on it acoustically and this beer spilled on the recorder and we had a bit of "Losing" with this warped falsetto and someone said, "Losing a whole beer," which became "Losing a Whole Year."

— Kevin Cadogan talking to Billboard about the origin of the song.

"Losing a Whole Year" was written by Stephan Jenkins and Kevin Cadogan. The song originated from a guitar riff that Cadogan had written, with Jenkins commenting that "the words were how that riff made me feel". Jenkins further discussed the meaning of the song, stating that it is about "a rich girl from Bernal Heights" and that it is "just lamenting the end of a relationship and all of its wasted time".

The band intended to release "Losing a Whole Year" as the lead single from Third Eye Blind (1997), although "Semi-Charmed Life" was released instead at the suggestion of Elektra Records.

== Composition ==
"Losing a Whole Year"
A 29-second sample of Third Eye Blind's "Losing a Whole Year" song.

"Losing a Whole Year" is an alternative rock and shoegaze song. According to the sheet music published at Musicnotes.com by Alfred Publishing, the song is written in the key of E major and is set at a tempo of 108 beats per minute with a time signature of 4/4 for most of the song except for two measures of 11/8 before the guitar solo and four during the ending. Jenkin's vocal range spans one octave, from F#_{4} to A_{5}.

== Critical reception ==
"Losing a Whole Year" was released as a single from Third Eye Blind's 1997 self-titled album. The song received a positive reaction from music critics. Chuck Eddy of Spin magazine called it one of the band's "catchiest" songs. Allmusic's Mike DeGagne agreed, writing that "its pop-friendly makeup of frolicking guitar and a welcoming tempo make it one of the band's most catchiest tunes."

== Chart performance ==
"Losing a Whole Year" stayed on the Billboard Modern Rock Tracks chart for 14 weeks and peaked at number 13 on May 2, 1998. The song also appeared on the Mainstream Rock Tracks chart in 1998, peaking at number 36.

== Music video ==
Third Eye Blind planned to make two music videos for "Losing a Whole Year", but ultimately only one was released. The video, directed by Francis Lawrence, features the band performing the song in front of an audience of three laughing women. At the end of the video, two cars crash into each other right in front of the band members.

== Cover versions ==
In 2009, American post-hardcore band A Lot Like Birds, on their album Plan B, included a cover of "Losing A Whole Year" at the end of their song "Sesame Street is No Place for Vengeance" as a hidden track.

== Track listings and formats ==
- Japanese CD single and German CD 1
1. "Losing a Whole Year" (LP version) – 3:21
2. "Horror Show" – 4:02
3. "Graduate" (remix) – 3:26
- Australian CD single and German CD 2
1. "Losing a Whole Year" (remix - Strings Up) – 3:01
2. "Losing a Whole Year" (radio mix) – 3:18
3. "Losing a Whole Year" (remix) – 3:12

== Credits and personnel ==
Credits and personnel are adapted from the Third Eye Blind album liner notes.

- Kevin Cadogan – writer, guitar, vocals
- Stephan Jenkins – writer, vocals, percussion, producer
- Arion Salazar – bass
- Michael Urbano – drums
- Eric Valentine – engineering, producer
- Tom Lord-Alge – mixing
- Ted Jensen – mastering

== Charts ==
Weekly chart performance for "Losing a Whole Year"
Chart (1998)	Peak position
US Alternative Airplay (Billboard)	13
US Mainstream Rock (Billboard)	36

== Release history ==
Release history and formats for "Losing a Whole Year"
Region	Date	Format(s)	Label(s)	Ref.
Japan	December 15, 1997	CD	Elektra	
United States	February 23, 1998	Alternative radio	Elektra	
