= It's a Beautiful Place =

Studio album by Water from Your Eyes
- Released: August 22, 2025
- Recorded: 2024–2025
- Genres: Experimental pop; indie rock
- Length: 29:11
- Label: Matador
- Producer: Nate Amos

Water from Your Eyes chronology
MP3 Player 1 (2024)	It's a Beautiful Place (2025)	It's Beautiful (2025)

Singles from It's a Beautiful Place
- 1. "Life Signs" Released: June 4, 2025; 2. "Playing Classics" Released: July 15, 2025; 3. "Nights in Armor" Released: August 18, 2025

It's a Beautiful Place is the seventh studio album by American band Water from Your Eyes. It was released on August 22, 2025, through Matador Records, as the follow-up to their sixth studio album, Everyone's Crushed (2023). After gaining attention with their previous studio albums, Water from Your Eyes signed a deal with Matador. It was supported by three singles and a tour across North America and Europe. Water from Your Eyes would begin working on new material in 2024, recording in Nate Amos' bedroom and in New York.

It's a Beautiful Place is an experimental pop and indie rock album that explores themes of cosmic insignificance versus human importance, the nature of meaning, and the challenges of optimism in a difficult world. Upon release, the album received critical acclaim from multiple publications. The project was promoted through three singles—"Life Signs", "Playing Classics" and "Nights in Armor"—as well as an accompanying tour. Between September and December 2025, Water from Your Eyes would embark on the headlining tour for the album.

== Background and composition ==
Most of the recording of It's a Beautiful Place was done in Nate Amos's bedroom, with Amos and Rachel Brown striving to balance a worldview that holds factors of absurdity and existentialism. The album was made out to be a musically diverse album; Amos stated, "we wanted to present a wide range of styles in a way that acknowledges everything's just a tiny blip". Amos had worked on his home computer while producing the songs. It's a Beautiful Place explores themes of cosmic insignificance versus human importance, the nature of meaning, and the challenges of optimism in a difficult world alongside the darker and deeper humor. Amelie Grice of Clash wrote about the lead single "Life Signs" saying it "starts with a fast-paced, dry but stylish urgency which later erupts into a more typical Water From Your Eyes overflowing, energetic and enjoyably overstimulating style." She also had felt the track "Born 2" had exploded "with an instrumental introduction reminiscent of My Bloody Valentine." The song took inspiration from the literary works The Dispossessed (by Ursula K. Le Guin) and There Is No Unhappy Revolution (by Marcello Tarí). Described as "pop experimentalism" and an indie rock album, many of the musical themes present on It's a Beautiful Place were similar to those on their sixth studio album, Everyone's Crushed (2023). The album features 10 tracks with a combined runtime of about 29 minutes; six of which containing lyrics and the other four being instrumentals.

== Release and promotion ==
It's a Beautiful Place's lead single "Life Signs" was released on June 4, 2025; the album was announced after the release of the song. "Playing Classics" was released as the second single on July 15. It was followed by the third and final single, "Nights in Armor", on August 18. It's a Beautiful Place was released on August 22, 2025, through Matador Records, as the seventh studio album by the band. Water from Your Eyes announced the It's a Beautiful Place Tour and its 48 concert dates throughout North America and Europe. The North American leg of the tour began on September 22, 2025, in Philadelphia, Pennsylvania, and concluded on November 7, 2025, in Denver, Colorado. About a week later European leg would start on November 13 and end on December 7.

== Critical reception ==
Professional ratings
Aggregate scores
Source	Rating
AnyDecentMusic?	8.1/10
Metacritic	82/100
Review scores
Source	Rating
AllMusic	4/5 stars
Clash	8/10
Exclaim!	8/10
The Line of Best Fit	8/10
Mojo	4/5 stars
NME	4/5 stars
Paste	8.7/10
Pitchfork	8.3/10
PopMatters	8/10
The Skinny	4/5 stars

Editors at AnyDecentMusic? rated It's a Beautiful Place an 8.1 out of 10, based on 15 scores. According to the review aggregator Metacritic, It's a Beautiful Place received "universal acclaim" based on a weighted average score of 82 out of 100 from 15 critic scores.

Philip Sherburne of Pitchfork rated the album an 8.3 out of 10, writing it was "super chill and totally destabilizing." Paste's Vic Borlando would rate it 8.7 out of 10 saying the album "makes disenchantment feel as grandiose and overwhelming as falling out of love." Meanwhile, Exclaim!'s Eric Hill gave the album an 8 out of 10. Hill commented, "the duo continue their upward trajectory, finding new and casually complex ways of expressing their musical minds." Another 8 out of 10 came from Alison Ross of PopMatters who praised Brown's voice for having "a quality that draws you into its secretive sphere" and the group's "stunning" musical maturity. Matty Pywell writing for NME wrote "One of indie's most unique duos embrace sci-fi sounds, frightening existentialism and a newfound heaviness," rating the record of 4 out of 5.

Devin Birse of The Line of Best Fit wrote about It's a Beautiful Place saying it's "a screeching Hail Mary, a short self-imploding burst of infinity guitars held together by a complex web of mathy rhythms." The Skinny's Noah Barker felt that while the material is "scarce," the quality is a "renewable resource on par with a nuclear fusion plant. Choruses hum, drumlines bounce, and there's always enough subversion for leftovers". Amelie Grice writing for Clash would write that [it] is "a stylish and composed exploration of alternative musical forms." Grice would discuss that "There is a distinctive confidence as Rachel Brown and Nate Amos weave nu-metal backbeat, indie guitar twang, piano motifs and deadpan vocals together." DIY's Dylan McNally said that it is "weird–and at times disorientating in its layers–but always brilliant. Above all else, it lives up to its name."

=== Year-end lists ===
It's a Beautiful Place on year-end lists
Publication	#	Ref.
Stereogum	19	
Pitchfork	17	
Rolling Stone	55	

== Commercial performance ==
It's a Beautiful Place was released to all streaming platforms on August 22, 2025. In the United Kingdom, the album peaked at number 21 on the UK Independent Albums chart within a week of release. It also saw a peak of number 53 on the UK Album Downloads chart. In Scotland, It's a Beautiful Place peaked number 74 on the Scottish Albums chart composed by the Official Charts Company.

== Track listing ==
No.	Title	Length
1.	"One Small Step"	0:26
2.	"Life Signs"	4:32
3.	"Nights in Armor"	3:09
4.	"Born 2"	4:24
5.	"You Don't Believe in God?"	1:25
6.	"Spaceship"	4:49
7.	"Playing Classics"	5:53
8.	"It's a Beautiful Place"	0:50
9.	"Blood on the Dollar"	2:40
10.	"For Mankind"	0:59
Total length:		29:11

== Personnel ==
Credits from Tidal.

- Nate Amos – production, songwriting
- Rachel Brown – vocals, songwriting
- Howie Weinberg – mastering

== Charts ==
Chart performance for It's a Beautiful Place
Chart (2025)	Peak position
Scottish Albums (Official Charts)	74
UK Album Downloads (Official Charts)	53
UK Independent Albums (Official Charts)	21

== Release history ==
Release dates and formats for It's A Beautiful Place
Region	Date	Format(s)	Version	Label	Ref.
Various	August 22, 2025	Digital download; streaming; LP; CD	Original	Matador Records	
