= Graduate (song) =

1997 single by Third Eye Blind

Single by Third Eye Blind

from the album Third Eye Blind
- B-side: "Horror Show"; "Semi-Charmed Life"
- Released: July 15, 1997
- Studio: Toast; Skywalker Ranch; H.O.S. (San Francisco)
- Length: 3:08
- Label: Elektra
- Songwriters: Stephan Jenkins; Kevin Cadogan
- Producers: Stephan Jenkins; Eric Valentine

Third Eye Blind singles chronology
"Semi-Charmed Life" (1997)	"Graduate" (1997)	"How's It Going to Be" (1997)

"Graduate" is a song by American rock band Third Eye Blind from their eponymous debut studio album (1997). It was released to radio as the second single from the album in July 1997 by Elektra Records. Frontman Stephan Jenkins and guitarist Kevin Cadogan are credited as co-writers on the song. Production on the song was helmed by Jenkins and Eric Valentine. According to Jenkins, the song is about the band's experience after being signed to a major record label.

The song reached number 26 on the Hot Mainstream Rock Tracks chart in the U.S., and number 14 on the Hot Modern Rock Tracks chart. Additionally, it was featured in the 1998 film Can't Hardly Wait starring Seth Green and Jennifer Love Hewitt. The band played the song at the 25th Annual American Music Awards, changing some of the lyrics to "can I masturbate" in place of "can I graduate." In 2011, former Third Eye Blind members Cadogan and Arion Salazar performed the song and made an unofficial video.

== Writing and inspiration ==
"Graduate" was written by frontman Stephan Jenkins and guitarist Kevin Cadogan. According to Cadogan, the song originated from a bandmate jokingly saying the phrase "Get ready to roll!!", with Jenkins then crafting the lyrics "can I graduate?" in the same style. In an interview with Billboard, Jenkins said that the concept of the song was developed through the band's experience as they tried to get signed by a major record label. He further explained the meaning of the song:

"Graduate" is about after we got signed, and it's the process of getting signed. I'm still standing in front of some suit at a record company asking permission. I felt like some kind of lap-dancer, some student again, like I was still in high school. Can I get my grade on my paper? What it's really saying is "I'm not really asking if I can graduate. I'm not asking for your permission. I'm beyond your permission. I'm beyond your control.

== Composition ==
According to the sheet music published at Musicnotes.com by Alfred Publishing, the song is written in the key of D major and is set in time signature of common time with a tempo of 141 beats per minute. Jenkins's vocal range spans one octave, from A_{4} to B_{5}.

== Chart performance ==
In the United States, "Graduate" peaked at number 26 on Billboard's Mainstream Rock chart.

== Live performances ==
The song was performed at the 25th Annual American Music Awards, with the band substituting the lyric "can I graduate" with "can I masturbate". Third Eye Blind performed the song alongside Billy Idol at the 1998 KROQ Weenie Roast. In January 2020, the band performed the song as a duet with Yungblud at the Roxy Theatre. Jenkins has acknowledged that "Graduate" is a staple on their performance set lists, further commenting: "I'm not sick of [playing] it because the audience, they ignite off of it.". Despite being released as a B-side, "Horror Show" has been performed live by the band over 50 times as of June 2023.

== In popular culture ==
The song was featured in the film and on the soundtrack to the 1998 American teen romantic comedy film Can't Hardly Wait.

A re-recorded version was included as a playable song in the 2010 rhythm game Guitar Hero: Warriors of Rock.

== Track listings and formats ==
- European CD single
1. "Graduate" – 3:08
2. "Graduate" (remix) – 3:25
3. "Horror Show" – 4:00
- Australian CD single
1. "Graduate" – 3:12
2. "Semi-Charmed Life" (clean version) – 3:43
3. "Semi-Charmed Life" – 4:30
4. "Graduate" (remix) – 3:27
- Japanese CD single
1. "Graduate" – 3:08
2. "Semi-Charmed Life" (clean version) – 3:42
3. "Semi-Charmed Life" – 4:27
- 7–inch vinyl
1. "Graduate" – 3:08
2. "Horror Show" – 4:00

== Credits and personnel ==
Credits and personnel are adapted from the Third Eye Blind album liner notes.

- Stephan Jenkins – writer, vocals, percussion, producer
- Kevin Cadogan – writer, guitar, vocals
- Arion Salazar – bass, vocals
- Brad Hargreaves – drums
- Eric Valentine – engineering, producer, mixing
- Ted Jensen – mastering

== Charts ==
=== Weekly charts ===
Weekly chart performance for "Graduate"
Chart (1997)	Peak position
Australia (ARIA)	87
Canada Rock/Alternative (RPM)	6
UK Singles (Official Charts)	83
US Alternative Airplay (Billboard)	14
US Mainstream Rock (Billboard)	26

=== Year-end charts ===
Year-end chart performance for "Graduate"
Chart (1997)	Position
US Modern Rock Tracks (Billboard)	61

== Release history ==
Release dates and formats for "Graduate"
Region	Date	Format(s)	Label(s)	Ref.
United States	July 15, 1997	Alternative radio	Elektra	
Japan	July 25, 1997	CD	Elektra	
United Kingdom	November 24, 1997	7-inch vinyl; CD; cassette	Elektra	
