= What Is My Capacity to Love? =

EP by Thanks for Coming
- Released: September 29, 2023
- Genre: Indie rock
- Language: English
- Label: Danger Collective

Thanks for Coming chronology
You Haven't Missed Much (2022)	What Is My Capacity to Love? (2023)

I feel like I wasn't really avoiding anything. I feel like my relationship with that person, and not all of the people, but most of the people leading up to that, were all tropes. I'm not even sure it was about those people when I was like, ‘I'm in love with this person.’ I would be like, ‘Or am I?’ After a break-up I’d feel like I actually just really wanted to be in love, and then I projected all these things onto this person, and then I just kept projecting the same things on different people. I don't even think it was based on what I wanted in a partner. It was based on these tropes of romance that I think I've been seeking since I was a kid pretty much watching rom-coms.

—Rachel Brown on the themes of What Is My Capacity to Love?

What Is My Capacity to Love? is a 2023 EP by Thanks for Coming, the solo project by Rachel Brown of Water from Your Eyes. The work was released while Water from Your Eyes was on tour and was previewed with the tracks "Loop" and "Unlimited Love".

== Reception ==
This EP was a staff pick at Exclaim!, where critic Kaelen Bell wrote that it "feels just as impactful as the concrete-smashing weirdness of [Water from Your Eyes'] Everyone's Crushed". David Renshaw of The Fader wrote that this EP "represents an emotional breakthrough for Brown", by exploring personal relationships intimately. Writing for Pitchfork, Nina Corcoran rated this release a 6.0 out of 10, characterizing it as "a collection of charming, heartfelt bedroom pop songs that deserve to be more fully realized", writing that while "Brown’s mesmerizing, almost detached singing anchors the music" which she calls like a mixtape and sums up that "the homespun quality of Thanks for Coming songs draws them close to the chest, but the music deserves a more striking, realized form too". In Spill Magazine, Ljubinko Zivkovic rated this album 8 out of 10, writing that this music "kept that youthful exuberance when [Brown] start creating" in spite of having released dozens of works.

== Track listing ==
1. "Let It Be 10,000 Years (Or Just 0.01cm from Each Other)" – 2:06
2. "Unlimited Love" – 1:51
3. "Loop" – 3:40
4. "Try Again" – 3:58
5. "Depends" – 2:03
6. "Postcard" – 2:06
7. "Melted" – 2:20
8. "Spotless Mind" – 2:48

== Personnel ==
- Rachel Brown – instrumentation, vocals

== See also ==
- 2023 in American music
- List of 2023 albums
- Unlimited Love, a Red Hot Chili Peppers album
