= Semi-Charmed Life =

1997 single by Third Eye Blind

Single by Third Eye Blind

from the album Third Eye Blind
- B-side: "Tattoo of the Sun"; "London"; "God of Wine"
- Released: February 18, 1997
- Studio: Toast; Skywalker Ranch; H.O.S. (San Francisco)
- Genre: Alternative rock; power pop; rap rock
- Length: 4:27 (album version); 3:45 (single version)
- Label: Elektra
- Songwriter: Stephan Jenkins
- Producers: Stephan Jenkins; Eric Valentine

Third Eye Blind singles chronology
"Semi-Charmed Life" (1997)	"Graduate" (1997)

Music video
- "Semi-Charmed Life" on YouTube

"Semi-Charmed Life" is a song by the American rock band Third Eye Blind from their debut studio album, Third Eye Blind (1997). Elektra Records released the song to US modern rock radio on February 18, 1997, as the album's lead single. Frontman Stephan Jenkins is credited as the sole writer of the song, although guitarist Kevin Cadogan has disputed the song's authorship through litigation. The song was produced by Jenkins and Eric Valentine. An alternative rock and power pop song with a rap-influenced singing style, the lyrics of "Semi-Charmed Life" concern a crystal meth addiction and transitional periods in one's life.

"Semi-Charmed Life" was one of the first demos recorded for Third Eye Blind, in which it went through five iterations before the band settled on its final mix. Valentine recorded and mixed the song in and around San Francisco at Toast Studios, Skywalker Ranch, H.O.S., and The Site. The instrumentation used in the song includes guitars, brushes, and a drum machine. According to Jenkins, the refrain of "Semi-Charmed Life" was inspired by Lou Reed's "Walk on the Wild Side", and the band intended for it to serve as an answer song. The song was conceived after Jenkins witnessed his friends using crystal meth at a Primus concert.

The music video for "Semi-Charmed Life" was directed by Jamie Morgan and it depicted an idealistic visual of San Francisco. The song received positive reviews from music critics, who praised its instrumentation and radio-friendly nature. In retrospective reviews, some critics have cited "Semi-Charmed Life" as one of the best songs of the 1990s. In the United States, the song peaked at number four on the Billboard Hot 100. The song was certified 4× Platinum by the Recording Industry Association of America (RIAA). Internationally, "Semi-Charmed Life" was a top 40 hit in six countries.

== Writing and inspiration ==
"In terms of the dark lyrics and the catchy tune, I was just messing with whatever the paradigm was – I've always had a mischievous nature in that way. I'm not a formulaic writer – I don't have some cookie-cutter method. It's whatever is provoking me at the moment."

— Stephan Jenkins talking to Kerrang! about the writing process.

Frontman Stephan Jenkins is credited as the sole songwriter of "Semi-Charmed Life". Jenkins intended to write a song that acted as a San Francisco response to Lou Reed's "Walk on the Wild Side", with the "doo, doo, doot" chants present throughout the song being directly inspired by Reed's song. In regards to the song's style, Jenkins explained that it was meant to reflect changes that occurred in the San Francisco music scene at the time, particularly a growing interest in hip hop. In an interview with Rolling Stone, Jenkins said that the concept of the song was developed through his observations of friends using crystal meth at a Primus concert. The juxtaposition of the music and lyrical content was intentional, as Jenkins intended to illustrate the "bright, shiny feeling" one gets when using crystal meth. Jenkins, however, maintains that the meaning of the song more broadly relates to changing periods in one's life. He further explained the meaning of the song:

It's about living in the Lower Haight [in San Francisco] and all the machinations that were going on at a time where my friend group was finally out of the [educational] institutions that we'd been in our whole lives – because we’d all been in school since kindergarten and everybody now was in their early 20s and out of college. And then probably underneath that, also the weight of coming to terms with the kind of agony that your life is always about to change and never be reliable.

The song was written well before Third Eye Blind was formed. During his time as a struggling musician in San Francisco, Jenkins recalled sitting in a room with friend Linda Perry, before she found fame with 4 Non Blondes. The two played each other early versions of "Semi-Charmed Life" and "What's Up?", both of which would later become massive hits for their respective bands. Jenkins later realized the songs performed in that private session would sell a combined 17 million records. Perry, however, denied that this session ever happened.

Jenkins was initially against the decision to release "Semi-Charmed Life" as the lead single from Third Eye Blind, as he did not believe that it was representative of the work as a whole. Guitarist Kevin Cadogan was concerned with the explicit lyrical content of the song, as he feared that radio stations would refuse to play the song. Elektra Records suggested that the band release "Semi-Charmed Life" as their debut single as opposed to "Losing a Whole Year", prompting the release of several radio edits of the song. Upon the song's success, Jenkins claimed that he believed most listeners misinterpreted the song to simply be a "happy summertime jam".

=== Songwriting claims ===
Prior to the formation of Third Eye Blind, Jenkins was part of the rap duo Puck and Zen, alongside Detroit rapper Herman Anthony Chunn. With the assistance of manager Eric Godtland, Jenkins and Chunn made a $10,000 deal for Jenkins to acquire the rights to guitar riffs that Chunn wrote, which would later be incorporated into "Semi-Charmed Life". This deal gave Jenkins sole authorship of the song, with Jenkins commenting: "I kept going until it was my song. I had no idea where that song was going, but I bought [Chunn] out." In 2000, rumors circulated that guitarist Tony Fredianelli, who had previously auditioned for Third Eye Blind in 1993, had written the song's hook. When reached for comment by the San Francisco Chronicle, producer Eric Valentine claimed that "Semi-Charmed Life" had "been around for many years. There are a lot of people who contributed to that tune and didn't get credit."

On October 16, 2018, approximately a year after the 2017 reissue of Third Eye Blind, Cadogan filed a lawsuit for infringement of copyright against Third Eye Blind and Jenkins. Despite being uncredited, Cadogan alleged that he was responsible for co-writing four songs on the album, including "Semi-Charmed Life", and thus was entitled to 25 percent of their profits, for which he had not been compensated. Cadogan also sought to establish authorship over the four songs in dispute. On August 21, 2019, the lawsuit was terminated through voluntary dismissal with prejudice.

== Recording and mixing ==
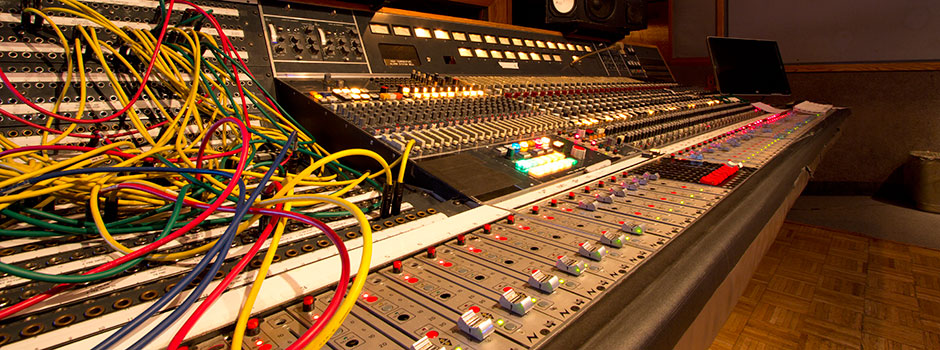
A Neve 8038 was used to record "Semi-Charmed Life".

"Semi-Charmed Life" was recorded in and around San Francisco at Toast Studios, Skywalker Ranch, and H.O.S. The song was produced by Jenkins and Eric Valentine, who also served as the song's recording and mixing engineer. Valentine recorded the song directly onto tape machines rather than using any computer assistance. It was recorded on a Neve 8038 mixing console with Studer A800 MKIII and Ampex MM1200 tape recorders. Valentine mixed the song at The Site, H.O.S., and Toast Studios, in which he used a Studer A800 tape recorder on a Neve 8078 mixing console. It was mastered by Ted Jensen at Sterling Sound Studios in New York City for a 3M 996 mastering tape.

"Semi-Charmed Life" was one of six demos first recorded for the band's debut album. According to Jenkins, five iterations of the song were recorded before the band settled on its final version. Bassist Arion Salazar described one of the demos as a "one-dimensional, acoustic guitar troubadour-y first position thing with basic guitar chords and some bohemian rapping." Cadogan provided multi-layered guitar textures using an Epiphone Casino, Hamer electric, Gibson J-200 acoustic, and a Gretsch Country Gentleman. Brad Hargreaves used a Pearl Export snare drum, with the initial recorded drum loop used in the song's final version. In 2017, one of the demos was released on the reissue of Third Eye Blind.

== Composition ==
"Semi-Charmed Life" is an alternative rock and power pop song, composed with a rap-influenced singing style. However, when writing the composition, Jenkins contends that he was more broadly influenced by hip hop music. The song incorporates "shoegazer and big guitar-chord soundscape musicality," as described by bassist Arion Salazar. Other musical instruments used are brushes and a drum machine. Reverb, wah-wah, tremolo and flange are also employed throughout the song in order to add "extra texture and sonic diversity." In "Semi-Charmed Life", Jenkins sings a refrain consisting of "doo, doo, doot" that was inspired by Lou Reed's 1972 single "Walk on the Wild Side", with Jenkins referring to "Semi-Charmed Life" as an answer song. "Semi-Charmed Life" opens with "loud guitars and a thudding rhythm section," which persists throughout the song. The verses are sung with a "hip-hop cadence," while the chorus is "[belted] out in [an] anthemic style."

According to the sheet music published at Musicnotes.com by Alfred Publishing, the song is written in the key of G major and is set in time signature of common time with a tempo of 104 beats per minute. Jenkins's vocal range spans nearly three octaves, from G_{3} to C_{6}. The song has a sequence of G–D–C in both the verses and chorus and G–D–C–G/B–Am in the bridge, as its chord progression. The lyrics of "Semi-Charmed Life" carry a message of crystal meth addiction, inspired by the drug addictions that Jenkins witnessed from several of his friends. Jenkins explained in Billboard magazine that the juxtaposition between the melody and lyrics were intentional, as it was meant to represent "the seductiveness of speed." Jenkins further explained: "Speed's a very bright, shiny drug, and I wanted the song to sound like that, but I also wanted the frustration in there. So a real poetic decision is determining the music. That's why you have that bright, melodic chorus but also that dirty guitar sound."

== Critical reception ==
James Sullivan of Rolling Stone referred to the song as "[o]ne of the most relentlessly sunshine-y songs of the Nineties." Mark Jenkins of The Washington Post referred to the song as a "rap-inflected pop-rocker." He commented: "'Semi-Charmed Life' take[s] an infectious glee in reinventing rock that's simple, direct and yet epic." David Grad of Entertainment Weekly praised the radio-friendly nature of the song, calling it a "nice taste of Third Eye Blind's formula." Conversely, David Browne of Entertainment Weekly described the song as a "less boisterous, lite-beer take on Chili Pepper frat punk" and described its "blast of guitars and drums" as "dated." Stephen Thomas Erlewine of AllMusic cited "Semi-Charmed Life" as evidence that Third Eye Blind can "craft a naggingly memorable hook." Also from AllMusic, Liana Jonas praised "Semi-Charmed Life" as an "infectious and buoyant rock song," commenting that the song's commercial success juxtaposed with its "blatant lyrics about oral sex and drug-induced highs ... goes to show the unpredictability of music-industry authorities." Glamour reviewer and senior editor Anna Moeslein cited "Semi-Charmed Life" as the best song of the 1990s, commenting that the "easy-breezy guitar and 'do do do!' intro still spark joy."

According to Justin Joffe of Observer, the song is "both poppy and addressed some heavy shit," which gave the band "an edge over their radio-ready contemporaries that many would later imitate with less sincerity." Aidin Vaziri of the San Francisco Chronicle referred to "Semi-Charmed Life" as "possibly the catchiest song about casual sex and meth addiction ever." Andrew Chow of Time designated "Semi-Charmed Life" as a classic karaoke song. In a critical review, G.M. of Spin stated that the song has "an oil-slick groove endemic to studio hacks and scene-burnouts." Arielle Gordon of Pitchfork referred to the song as an "inescapable hit," further commenting: "[the song] sounds like feeling the sun on your skin after a long winter. The opening snap of the drums, the ringing power chords, and the wordless refrain seem to beam down from some impossibly halcyon era, as if Cheap Trick suddenly became the house band for Schoolhouse Rock." At the 1997 Billboard Music Awards, "Semi-Charmed Life" garnered Third Eye Blind a win in the Modern Rock Track category.

== Chart performance ==
In the United States, "Semi-Charmed Life" debuted at number 17 on the Billboard Hot 100 chart for the issue dated July 5, 1997. The song reached its peak after five weeks, peaking at number four for the issue dated August 9, 1997. The song spent a total of 43 weeks on the chart, with the week of April 25, 1998, being its final appearance on the chart. On both the Modern Rock Tracks and Mainstream Top 40 charts, the song reached a peak of number one. The song was also a success on the US Adult Alternative Songs and Adult Top 40 charts, peaking at number six and three, respectively. On the Billboard Hot 100 year-end chart, "Semi-Charmed Life" peaked at number 17 and 57 for 1997 and 1998, respectively. The song also peaked at number one on the year-end US Modern Rock Tracks chart. Almost four months after its release, "Semi-Charmed Life" was certified gold by the Recording Industry Association of America (RIAA) for sales of five hundred thousand.

In Canada, "Semi-Charmed Life" peaked at number two on the Canada Top Singles chart for the issue dated August 4, 1997. The song placed at number 12 on the year-end chart while re-entering the chart at number 59 in 1998. On the Canada Rock/Alternative chart, "Semi-Charmed Life" peaked at number 3. The song also received considerable airplay in the country, with Nielsen Broadcast Data Systems (BDS) confirming that "Semi-Charmed Life" peaked at number 13 on the Canada Adult Contemporary chart. "Semi-Charmed Life" was also a success in Australia and the United Kingdom. The song debuted at number 49 on the Australian ARIA Singles Chart, and ascended to the number eight position nine weeks later. The song spent a total of 22 weeks on the chart in the country. "Semi-Charmed Life" was certified gold by the Australian Recording Industry Association (ARIA) for the shipment of 35,000 copies. In the United Kingdom, "Semi-Charmed Life" spent five weeks on the UK Singles Chart, peaking at number 33 for the issue dated September 27, 1997.

== Music video ==
=== Background ===
The music video was directed by Jamie Morgan in the South of Market district of San Francisco, California. Third Eye Blind recruited Morgan to direct the music video after being impressed with his work on Bush's "Swallowed" music video. Jenkins and Cadogan provided the production costs for the music video, with Jenkins commenting that "DIY's [are] very important to us." A radio edit was also used in the video, in which the majority of the bridge is omitted in addition to the phrase "crystal meth" being removed through backmasking. Regarding the idea behind the music video, the band strove to capture an idealistic visual of San Francisco. In order to accomplish this task, Morgan recruited San Francisco residents to appear in the video. Morgan also explained that the ending shot of a Moon landing was a reference to the MTV moonman logo, the MTV Generation, and "the idea of discovery and man's ability to wonder and explore." Morgan further expanded on the video's concept in an interview with Billboard, stating:

I found the scooter kids [for the video] driving around San Fran, and the same with the studio shots. [The band] told me they had friends, but when I arrived from London they didn't really have any, so I had to find them from the streets of San Francisco. They loved my first video [for Bush's "Swallowed,"] so that was the starting point for the two-day shoot. They just wanted me to come and shoot the San Francisco vibe, so I just made it up as we went along, and responded to the cast I found on the streets.

=== Synopsis ===
The video starts with a Nimbus satellite in outer space before quickly transitioning to an American flag patch on a man's leather jacket. With the refrain playing, the band members and a dog are shown driving a car on a highway. As the first verse begins, Jenkins walks down the sidewalk on Valencia Street in San Francisco while singing. He passes through an outdoor cafe as the video intercuts with scenes of people riding motorcycles. Once the first chorus begins, the video focuses on the band performing in a dimly lit room with a large spinning clock hanging behind them. As the refrain begins again, the video intercuts between scenes of the band performing and of them riding motorcycles throughout the city. Following these shots, Jenkins is shown to now be singing in front of a car parked alongside a strip, as intercuts play that focus on the faces of strangers surrounding Jenkins. The video also briefly focuses on two women kissing while walking on the sidewalk, before abruptly arguing. Once the second chorus begins, Jenkins begins to run through an alleyway while shots are also shown of the band continuing to perform. As the bridge ends, various people on scooters are shown to drive around the city. The band continues to perform while a group of young adults dance, argue, and kiss around them. The video ends with a shot of one of the women watching a moon landing on television, noticing that the American flag being planted is reminiscent of the patch in the beginning of the video.

== Live performances ==
The song was regularly performed at shows during MTV's Campus Invasion Tour and the Bonfire Tour (1998), in addition to performances at local clubs and venues following the album's release. In 1998, Third Eye Blind and Smash Mouth jointly headlined a college-theater tour, in which "Semi-Charmed Life" was regularly performed. Similarly, "Semi-Charmed Life" was performed during the band's co-headlining amphitheater tour with the Goo Goo Dolls in 2002. On December 8, 1997, Third Eye Blind performed the song at the Billboard Music Awards. Due to the commercial success of "Semi-Charmed Life" and the follow-up single "Graduate", Third Eye Blind were offered the role of being an opening act for the Rolling Stones, U2, and Foo Fighters on their respective tours. The song was performed on the Summer Gods Tour (2017–2019), with a recording of the performance subsequently included on the live album Summer Gods Tour Live 2017.

== Cultural impact ==
In 1998, Spin asked Foo Fighters frontman Dave Grohl what lyric from 1997 he wishes he would have written; Grohl cited the refrain of "Semi-Charmed Life". In January 2022, Third Eye Blind collaborated with Smith & Cult on a line of nail polish, which included a color titled "Semi-Charmed" to celebrate the 25th anniversary of their debut album. Additionally, the band released an acoustic version of "Semi-Charmed Life" on Unplugged (2022).

=== Usage in media ===
"Semi-Charmed Life" has been used in various media including film, television shows, and video games. The song had prominent appearances in Contact (1997), Excess Baggage (1997), Wild Things (1998), Dirty Work (1998), Gigli (2003), Game Night (2018), and The Lovebirds (2020). Despite not appearing on the film's soundtrack, "Semi-Charmed Life" was praised for its appearance in the 1999 teen sex comedy film American Pie. The song was also featured on the soundtrack for the 2005 film A Lot Like Love. Additionally, a mash-up of "Semi-Charmed Life" and "Call Me Maybe" circulated on the Internet in the middle of 2012. A cover version of the song was featured in the video game Alvin and the Chipmunks (2007). "Semi-Charmed Life" also appears as a playable track in the music rhythm video game Guitar Hero: Van Halen (2009) in addition to being downloadable content in Rock Band 4 (2015) and Rocksmith 2014 (2014). The song was used in the original theatrical trailer for Disney's The Tigger Movie, however it did receive backlash due to the lyrics being explicit and inappropriate for a trailer for a children's movie, despite none of the explicit lyrics even being used in the trailer. The song was also used in some trailers for Mr. Nice Guy, starring Jackie Chan.

=== Cover versions ===
Singers and bands of various genres have covered the song in their own style. American pop-rap duo Timeflies heavily sampled "Semi-Charmed Life" in their song "Semi-Charmed", which was released in November 2017. American rock band XEB, which consists of three of the founding members of Third Eye Blind, performed "Semi-Charmed Life" while touring in 2017. In October 2017, Mokita and Maty Noyes collaborated on the song "Goodbye", which repurposes the chorus of "Semi-Charmed Life". In 2018, American singer-songwriter Cassadee Pope referenced "Semi-Charmed Life" in her song "How I Feel Right Now". Dance Gavin Dance released a cover of the song on Hopeless Records' compilation album Songs That Saved My Life (2018). Four Year Strong released a cover of the song on their third studio album Explains It All (2009). Artist Machine Gun Kelly sampled the song in his record "Starman" from his album Lost Americana (2025).

== Track listings and formats ==
- United States CD and cassette single
1. "Semi-Charmed Life" (clean radio edit) – 3:42
2. "Tattoo of the Sun" – 4:15
- United Kingdom 7-inch vinyl
1. "Semi-Charmed Life" (album version) – 4:27
2. "Tattoo of the Sun" – 4:14
- Australian and German CD single, European CD 1
1. "Semi-Charmed Life" (radio edit) – 3:45
2. "London" – 3:04
3. "Tattoo of the Sun" – 4:15
- European CD 2
1. "Semi-Charmed Life" (album version) – 4:27
2. "London" – 3:04
3. "Tattoo of the Sun" – 4:15
- Japanese maxi-single and United Kingdom cassette single
1. "Semi-Charmed Life" (radio edit) – 3:45
2. "London" – 3:04
3. "Tattoo of the Sun" – 4:15
4. "God of Wine" – 5:17

== Credits and personnel ==
Credits and personnel are adapted from the "Semi-Charmed Life" CD single liner notes.

- Stephan Jenkins – vocals, guitar, acoustic guitar, brushes, programming
- Kevin Cadogan – guitar, vocals
- Arion Salazar – bass
- Brad Hargreaves – drums
- Eric Valentine – programming
- Ren Klyce – additional arrangement

== Charts ==
=== Weekly charts ===
Chart (1997)	Peak position
Australia (ARIA)	8
Canada Top Singles (RPM)	2
Canada Adult Contemporary (RPM)	13
Canada Rock/Alternative (RPM)	3
Germany (GfK)	91
Iceland (Íslenski Listinn Topp 40)	20
Scottish Singles Sales (Official Charts)	26
UK Singles (Official Charts)	33
US Billboard Hot 100	4
US Adult Alternative Airplay (Billboard)	6
US Adult Pop Airplay (Billboard)	3
US Alternative Airplay (Billboard)	1
US Mainstream Rock Airplay (Billboard)	26
US Pop Airplay (Billboard)	1

=== Year-end charts ===
Chart (1997)	Position
Australia (ARIA)	59
Canada Top Singles (RPM)	12
US Billboard Hot 100	17
US Adult Top 40 (Billboard)	7
US Mainstream Rock Tracks (Billboard)	91
US Modern Rock Tracks (Billboard)	1
US Top 40/Mainstream (Billboard)	3
US Triple-A (Billboard)	10

Chart (1998)	Position
Canada Top Singles (RPM)	59
US Billboard Hot 100	57
US Adult Top 40 (Billboard)	37
US Mainstream Top 40 (Billboard)	87

== Certifications and sales ==
Region	Certification	Certified units/sales
Australia (ARIA)	Gold	35,000^{^}
New Zealand (RMNZ)	3× Platinum	90,000^{‡}
United Kingdom (BPI)	Gold	400,000^{‡}
United States (RIAA)	4× Platinum	4,000,000^{‡}
^{^} Shipments figures based on certification alone.^{‡} Sales+streaming figures based on certification alone.

== Release history ==
Release history and formats for "Semi-Charmed Life"
Region	Date	Format(s)	Label(s)	Ref.
United States	February 18, 1997	Modern rock radio	Elektra	
United States	April 29, 1997	Contemporary hit radio	Elektra	
United States	June 17, 1997	CD	Elektra	
United Kingdom	September 8, 1997	7-inch vinyl; CD; cassette	Elektra	

== See also ==
- List of Billboard Modern Rock Tracks number-one songs of 1997
- List of Billboard Mainstream Top 40 number-one songs of 1997
- List of Hot 100 Airplay number-one singles of 1997
- List of Radio & Records number-one singles of 1997
