= Playing Classics =

Single by Water from Your Eyes

from the album It's a Beautiful Place
- Released: July 15, 2025
- Length: 5:53
- Label: Matador
- Producer: Nate Amos

Water from Your Eyes singles chronology
"Life Signs" (2025)	"Playing Classics" (2025)

"Playing Classics" is a song by American indie pop band Water from Your Eyes from their seventh studio album, It's a Beautiful Place (2025). Matador Records released it on July 15, 2025, as the album's second single. It was written by Nate Amos and Rachel Brown of Water from Your Eyes alongside audio engineer Howie Weinberg.

== Background and composition ==
The song was inspired by Charli XCX's Brat and Brat Summer. Amos would confirm that the song started as "an attempt to transform an existing guitar piece that I had stalled on into a dance number after Rachel requested that the next album have a disco song on it" and was originally 12 minutes long.

== Music video ==
The official music video for "Playing Classics" was released alongside the song on July 15, 2025. It was directed by James Dayton. The video follows a "teddy bear going for a long journey from a child’s stuffed animal, to a dog toy, to a skateboard accessory, to a star in Water From Your Eyes’ rehearsal".

== Critical reception ==
Alex Hudson of Exclaim! said that the song emerges one piece at a time, "there's a ta-tss hi-hat," a "trance-y synth bass and a steady club," followed by a breakdown where it's all replaced "clompy piano line" that sounds a bit like someone trying to play Charli XCX's "Mean Girls" using their palms. Hudson also felt that when Water from Your Eyes made the song, "[they] had made a classic of their own." Ian Gormely or Exclaim! had ranked the song as the 9th best of 2025.
