= Holo Boy =

Studio album by This Is Lorelei
- Released: December 12, 2025
- Recorded: May 2025
- Genre: Rock
- Length: 26:53
- Label: Double Double Whammy
- Producer: Nate Amos

This Is Lorelei chronology
Box for Buddy, Box for Star (2024)	Holo Boy (2025)	The Singer in My Band (2026)

Singles from Holo Boy
- 1. "Name the Band" Released: October 15, 2025; 2. "Holo Boy" Released: November 10, 2025

Holo Boy is a studio album by indie rock artist Nate Amos, of the band Water from Your Eyes, recording as This Is Lorelei. It was released on December 12, 2025, by Double Double Whammy, and consists of re-recorded songs from nine different releases on Amos' Bandcamp spanning from 2014 to 2021.

== Critical reception ==
Professional ratings
Aggregate scores
Source	Rating
AnyDecentMusic?	7.4/10
Metacritic	82/100
Review scores
Source	Rating
AllMusic	4/5 stars
Clash	8/10
The Guardian	4/5 stars
Paste	8/10
Pitchfork	7.5/10
Spectrum Culture	69%

According to the review aggregator Metacritic, Holo Boy received "universal acclaim" based on a weighted average score of 82 out of 100 from 5 critic scores.

Heather Phares of AllMusic said it "may not be as much of a statement as Box for Buddy, Box for Star, but its charms are undeniable." Robin Murray of Clash said it "is a wonderfully enjoyable cycle of straight-down-the-line songwriting." Karlie Rogers of Exclaim! called it "restless, odd and eccentric, and opens up a new chapter in the This Is Lorelei canon that also honours the journey on the way". Juan Gutierrez of Flood Magazine said that although it "doesn't possess the cohesion of Amos' previous record", it's "an interesting look at his songwriting style at different stages of his career".

Rachel Aroesti of The Guardian said it "is certainly enjoyable enough to justify its opportunistic repackaging." Manon Bushong of Paste said its tracks "feel finished and confident, allowing the record to serve as both the close of a chapter and an invigorating next step for This Is Lorelei." Sue Park of Pitchfork said it "doesn't go out of its way to experiment or provoke, but its emphasis on reinterpretation is strangely moving, particularly at this point in Amos' career." Trev Elkin of Spectrum Culture said it "has the air of an artist taking stock, as he maps the route taken while checking which parts still line up now."

== Track listing ==
All tracks are written by and produced by Nate Amos.

Track listing
No.	Title	Length
1.	"I Can't Fall"	3:02
2.	"But You Just Woke Me Up"	2:11
3.	"Dreams Away"	4:05
4.	"SF & GG"	1:41
5.	"My Friend 2"	1:47
6.	"Name the Band"	1:33
7.	"This is a Joke"	2:20
8.	"Mouth Man"	4:50
9.	"Money Right Now"	1:54
10.	"Holo Boy"	3:30
Total length:		26:53
