= Third Eye Blind (album) =

Studio album by Third Eye Blind
- Released: April 8, 1997
- Studios: Toast, Skywalker Ranch, H.O.S. (San Francisco)
- Genres: Alternative rock; post-grunge; power pop
- Length: 57:40
- Label: Elektra
- Producers: Stephan Jenkins; Eric Valentine; Ren Klyce

Third Eye Blind chronology
Third Eye Blind (1997)	Blue (1999)

Singles from Third Eye Blind
- 1. "Semi-Charmed Life" Released: February 18, 1997; 2. "Graduate" Released: July 15, 1997; 3. "How's It Going to Be" Released: October 20, 1997; 4. "Losing a Whole Year" Released: December 15, 1997; 5. "Jumper" Released: August 4, 1998

Third Eye Blind is the debut studio album by American rock band Third Eye Blind, released on April 8, 1997, by Elektra Records. The album was collectively written by Stephan Jenkins and Kevin Cadogan, while production was helmed by Jenkins and Eric Valentine. Recorded in and around San Francisco at Toast Studios, Skywalker Ranch, and H.O.S., the album incorporates elements of alternative rock, post-grunge and power pop. Thematically, the album focuses on topics such as relationships, drug addiction, suicide prevention, and the band's experience of being signed to a major record label. Third Eye Blind was promoted with five singles: "Semi-Charmed Life", "Graduate", "How's It Going to Be", "Losing a Whole Year", and "Jumper".

== Music and lyrics ==
The central theme of Third Eye Blind is loss, with the album exploring subjects such as suicide, crystal methamphetamine addiction, and sexual abuse. "Semi-Charmed Life", an alternative rock song composed with a rap-influenced singing style, was one of the first songs recorded for the album. The song focuses on a crystal methamphetamine addiction, although Jenkins contends that it more broadly relates to changing periods in one's life.

== Title and artwork ==
When developing a band name and a title for their debut record, Jenkins sought a name with "wit and a sense of punk-rock irony". The name "Third Eye Blind" is meant to refer to a metaphysical third eye; however, the band also intended to satirize the concept. Alli and Ro-Starr were responsible for the album's art direction, with the latter also crafting the band's "falling man" logo. Kate Garner was responsible for the album's photography, with the exclusion of the album cover which was shot by Christine Alicino on December 16, 1996, in San Francisco, California. The shot features model Shandra Boatwright, eyes closed with her mouth wide open, as her and Jenkins' hands are placed on her forehead. Alicino commented that she was hired to "photograph a young woman with an expressive mouth in my edgy polaroid style". In order to achieve this expressive appearance, Boatwright wore bright red lipstick and dark eyeliner by makeup artist Raul Anthony also from San Francisco. Later Raul was hired to do hair and makeup for the band's first music video.

The first pressing of Third Eye Blind in the United States featured a sepia-toned album cover with a red band logo. This pressing was limited to approximately 500,000 copies in the country. However, it was still employed in the United Kingdom and other European nations. The second pressing of the album featured these colors reverted, with a red-toned cover and yellow band logo. In Japan, the album was released with a cyan, negative photo cover. The 20th anniversary edition of the album features a black-toned version of the cover.

In April 2022, Jenkins stated on Twitter that the sepia-toned cover is "how [the artwork is] supposed to be," although the artwork was changed to a red-tone due to Elektra Records finding the latter to be "more flashy."

== Documentary ==
In December 2019, a 22-minute documentary short film titled Motorcycle Drive By was announced on Third Eye Blind's Twitter page. The documentary is directed by David Wexler and focuses on the backstory of the song of same name. The documentary was originally planned to premiere on April 17, 2020, at the 19th Tribeca Film Festival, although the film festival was indefinitely postponed due to the COVID-19 pandemic. The documentary was then released on May 29, 2020, on YouTube as part of the We Are One: A Global Film Festival.

== Touring ==
Third Eye Blind performed across the United States alongside Eve 6 on MTV's Campus Invasion tour. The band also performed as an opening act for the Rolling Stones and U2 on their respective tours. The band performed the album in its entirety during the first Summer Gods Tour in 2017.

== Reception ==
Professional ratings
Review scores
Source	Rating
AllMusic	4/5 stars
Christgau's Consumer Guide	(neither)
Encyclopedia of Popular Music	5/5 stars
Entertainment Weekly	B
Pitchfork	8.3/10
The Rolling Stone Album Guide	3/5 stars
Sputnikmusic	4.5/5

Critical reception to Third Eye Blind was generally positive. Stephen Thomas Erlewine of AllMusic described Third Eye Blind as "easy on the ears," stating that "its straight-ahead professionalism makes it a pleasurable listen for post-grungers". David Grad of Entertainment Weekly described the album as "balancing a cheery ear for harmonies with a finely honed sense of despair".

Third Eye Blind was a sleeper hit, entering the Billboard album charts at number 135 and then peaking at number 25 nearly a year after release. The album spent a total of 106 weeks on the chart, and was certified 6× platinum by the RIAA in August 2001. As of April 2017, Third Eye Blind has sold over 6 million units in the U.S., selling approximately 84,000 units in its best week. The album remains as Third Eye Blind's most successful release, accounting for the plurality of their career sales.

== Legacy ==
In 2017, the band reissued the album to celebrate its 20th anniversary, which includes three rerecorded versions of their initial unreleased songs "Alright Caroline", "Scattered", and "Tattoo Of The Sun", and five demos.

In 2022, Avril Lavigne cited the album as one of the biggest influences in her music career.

== Track listing ==
=== Standard edition ===
All tracks are written by Stephan Jenkins and Kevin Cadogan, except where noted.

No.	Title	Writer(s)	Length
1.	"Losing a Whole Year"		3:20
2.	"Narcolepsy"		3:48
3.	"Semi-Charmed Life"	Jenkins	4:28
4.	"Jumper"	Jenkins	4:32
5.	"Graduate"		3:09
6.	"How's It Going to Be"		4:13
7.	"Thanks a Lot"		4:57
8.	"Burning Man"		2:59
9.	"Good for You"		3:52
10.	"London"		3:07
11.	"I Want You"	Jenkins	4:29
12.	"The Background"		4:56
13.	"Motorcycle Drive By"	Jenkins	4:22
14.	"God of Wine"		5:17
Total length:			57:29

Third Eye Blind – Japanese edition (bonus track)
No.	Title	Writer(s)	Length
15.	"Tattoo of the Sun"	Jenkins; Cadogan; Arion Salazar	4:16
Total length:			61:45

=== 20th Anniversary edition ===
Third Eye Blind – 20th Anniversary edition (bonus disc)
No.	Title	Writer(s)	Length
1.	"Alright Caroline" (2016 recording)	Jenkins	4:50
2.	"Scattered" (2016 recording)	Jenkins	3:17
3.	"Slow Motion" (demo)	Jenkins	4:36
4.	"Semi-Charmed Life" (demo)	Jenkins	4:19
5.	"A Kiss Goodnight" (demo)		3:14
6.	"Scattered" (demo)	Jenkins	3:16
7.	"Heroin" (demo)	Lou Reed	4:44
8.	"Tattoo of the Sun" (2017 version)	Jenkins	4:30
Total length:			32:46

== Personnel ==
Personnel taken from Third Eye Blind CD booklet, except where noted.

Third Eye Blind

- Kevin Cadogan – guitar (all except 11); vocals (tracks 1–7, 10); autoharp (track 6)
- Brad Hargreaves – drums (tracks 3–5, 7–10, 12, 14)
- Stephan Jenkins – vocals (all tracks); percussion (tracks 1, 4, 5, 11, 13, 14); brushes (track 3); guitar (3, 4, 7, 11); acoustic guitar (tracks 3, 13); programming (tracks 3, 13); drums (tracks 11, 13)
- Arion Salazar – bass (all tracks except 11); vocals (tracks 2, 4–6, 9, 10, 13); piano (track 4)

Additional musicians

- Michael Urbano – drums (tracks 1, 2, 6, 13)
- Eric Valentine – programming (tracks 3, 11, 13); piano (tracks 7, 14); guitar, keyboards (track 11)
- Ari Gorman – cello (track 6)

Production

- Stephan Jenkins – production (all tracks); keyboard arrangements (tracks 4, 7, 11, 14)
- Eric Valentine – co-production (all tracks); engineering (all except 6); additional engineering (track 6); mixing (tracks 3–5, 7–14)
- Ren Klyce – production (track 6); additional arrangement (track 3)
- Dave Gleeson – engineering (6, 7, 14)
- Jaquire King – second engineer
- Kevin Scott – second engineer
- Tom Lord-Alge – mixing (tracks 1, 2, 6)
- Ted Jensen – mastering
- Kevin Cadogan – additional production, additional arrangement
- Arion Salazar – additional production, additional arrangement

Design

- Alli – art direction
- Ro-Starr – art direction, logos/design
- Christine Alicino – front cover photo
- Kate Garner – photography

== Charts ==
=== Weekly charts ===
Weekly chart performance for Third Eye Blind
Chart (1997–1998)	Peak position
Australian Albums (ARIA)	51
Canada Top Albums/CDs (RPM)	34
New Zealand Albums (RMNZ)	20
US Billboard 200	25
US Top Album Sales (Billboard)	18

2022 weekly chart performance
Chart (2022)	Peak position
US Vinyl Albums (Billboard)	6

=== Year-end charts ===
Year-end chart performance for Third Eye Blind
Chart (1997)	Position
US Billboard 200	101
Chart (1998)	Position
US Billboard 200	35
Chart (1999)	Position
US Billboard 200	138

== Certifications and sales ==
Region	Certification	Certified units/sales
Canada (Music Canada)	Platinum	100,000^{^}
New Zealand (RMNZ)	Gold	7,500^{^}
United States (RIAA)	6× Platinum	6,000,000^{^}
^{^} Shipments figures based on certification alone.

== Release history ==
Release formats for Third Eye Blind
Region	Date	Edition(s)	Format(s)	Label	Ref.
United States	April 8, 1997	Standard	CD; LP; cassette	Elektra	
Japan	May 25, 1997	Standard	CD	Elektra	
United Kingdom	July 14, 1997	Standard	CD; LP	Elektra	
Worldwide	June 9, 2017	20th Anniversary	CD; LP; digital download	Rhino	
