= Life Signs =

Single by Water from Your Eyes

from the album It's a Beautiful Place
- Released: June 4, 2025
- Recorded: 2025
- Genre: Rock; dream pop
- Length: 4:32
- Label: Matador
- Producer: Nate Amos

Water from Your Eyes singles chronology
"The Good Ship Lifestyle" (2024)	"Life Signs" (2025)	"Playing Classics" (2025)

Music video
- "Life Signs" on YouTube

"Life Signs" is a song by the American indie pop band Water from Your Eyes, from their seventh studio album, It's a Beautiful Place (2025). It was released by Matador Records on June 4, 2025, as the album's lead single. The song was written by Brown and Amos, who produced it alongside audio engineer Howie Weinberg.

"Life Signs" is a rock song that incorporates elements of dream pop. The song is characterized by its fast-paced rhythms and the deadpan vocal style. Critics had deemed it a standout track from It's a Beautiful Place. The song was released alongside a music video directed by Brown.

== Background and recording ==
Nate Amos and Rachel Brown are frequent collaborators. Brown ha met Amos at a DIY show at his house in Chicago, Illinois. They later formed Water from Your Eyes and relocated to Brooklyn, New York. In an interview with Nylon, Amos stated that "The guitar part in 'Life Signs' started as a 24-note quarter-tone series generated by a random number generator." Later in an interview with DIY, Amos noted that the song was arranged to be more of a "rock" song. Going further into detail, "but overall it didn’t have much of an effect on the album–most of it was written before we had the full live band anyway."

== Composition ==
"Life Signs" is a rock song that has also been described as dream pop. "Life Signs" is 4 minutes and 32 seconds long. Both Brown and Amos wrote the song, with production handled by the latter. The duo uses "foreboding" lyrical phrasing, for example, "Lost my reverie / It’s locked up in a prison". Post-Trash's Alex Hanse would comment on the song's "peal of electric guitar" feeling that it introduced "the dueling chug of stacked guitars".

== Critical reception ==
Rolling Stone's Jon Blistein felt that Life Signs finds the duo delving into the "crunchy riffage of late-90s, early-Y2k alt-rock, without sacrificing the "avant-garde" twists and turns that are a hallmark of [their] output." Alison Ross of PopMatters called it a hard rock song that later switches to dream pop. Amelie Grice of Clash would write about the song saying it "starts with a fast-paced, dry but stylish urgency which later erupts into a more typical Water From Your Eyes overflowing, energetic and enjoyably over-stimulating style." Pitchfork's Holden Seidlitz would say the song is "filled with unresolved tension" and "operates like language poetry, preserving the band’s freneticism and oddity in doom-scroll onomatopoeia." The reviewer had compared the song's "resultant clash" to the likes of American rock bands Metallica and Title Fight. Joseph Mastel of The Spill Magazine had commented on the "deadpan spoken word vocal style" displayed by Rachel Brown.

== Music video ==
The official music video for "Life Signs" was released alongside the song on June 4, 2025. It was directed by Rachel Brown. The video takes place in television. As described by Jon Blistein of Rolling Stone, it finds the duo "trapped in an endless loop of television as both participants in and insatiable viewers of a barrage of shows and commercials."

== Personnel ==
Credits adapted from Apple Music.

- Nate Amos – mixing, engineering, production
- Rachel Brown – vocals
- Howie Weinberg – mastering
