= Fantasy of a Broken Heart =

American art pop duo

Fantasy of a Broken Heart is an American art pop duo consisting of Al Nardo and Bailey Wollowitz. Nardo and Wollowitz are also live members in Water from Your Eyes and This Is Lorelei.

== History ==
The duo originally met in 2017. In May 2024, the duo announced their debut album and the first single, "Ur Heart Stops". The duo also released the single "Loss" ahead of the album's release. The duo released their debut album, Feats of Engineering, in 2024. In 2025, the duo released an EP titled Chaos Practitioner.

== Discography ==
Studio albums

- Feats of Engineering (2024)

EPs

- Chaos Practitioner (2025)
