= The Singer in My Band =

Studio album by This Is Lorelei
- Released: September 11, 2026
- Genres: Alternative country, folk rock
- Length: 34:36
- Label: Matador
- Producer: Nate Amos

This Is Lorelei chronology
Holo Boy (2025)	The Singer in My Band (2026)

Singles from The Singer in My Band
- 1. "Billy Came Back" Released: June 23, 2026; 2. "Oh No Now My" Released: August 5, 2026; 3. "The Kid With the Crown" Released: September 9, 2026

The Singer in My Band is the third studio album by the American musician Nate Amos, under his alias This Is Lorelei. The album was released on September 11, 2026 by Matador Records, his first release with the label.

== Background ==
Amos recorded the album at his home studio in Brooklyn. The album was completed before Amos signed with Matador, having kept the album a secret from the label. Amos submitted the finished project within half an hour of signing his contract.

Amos describes the album as his "road album", having conceived the songs "while daydreaming in the car without access to any instruments".

== Release ==
The album was announced on June 23, 2026, with the release of the lead single "Billy Came Back". A second single, titled "Oh No Now My" was released on August 5, 2026. A third single, "The Kid With the Crown", was released on September 9, 2026.

== Critical reception ==
Professional ratings
Aggregate scores
Source	Rating
Any Decent Music	7.3/10
Metacritic	82/100
Review scores
Source	Rating
AllMusic	4.5/5 stars
Exclaim!	7/10
God Is in the TV	8/10
Mojo	4/5 stars
NME	4/5 stars
Paste	B+
Pitchfork	8.0/10
Record Collector	3/5 stars
Sydney Morning Herald	4/5 stars
Uncut	7/10

Any Decent Music gave the album a weighted average score of 7.3 out of 10 from thirteen critic scores. According to Metacritic, it received "universal acclaim" based on a weighted average score of 82 out of 100 from twelve critic scores.

== Track listing ==
All tracks are written by Nate Amos.

The Singer in My Band track listing
No.	Title	Length
1.	"I Will Eat My Heart in the Morning Light"	3:17
2.	"Oh No Now My"	3:08
3.	"Billy Came Back"	3:09
4.	"Watching Heaven Fall"	3:12
5.	"Sailing (Your Baby's Down)"	3:32
6.	"The Singer in My Band"	2:25
7.	"Nitro"	1:26
8.	"Hey Sarah Is It Gonna Rain Forever"	3:27
9.	"The Kid with the Crown"	4:14
10.	"And I Haven't Seen My Love in Quite a While"	3:28
11.	"Don't You Cry in Lonesomeness"	3:18
Total length:		34:36

== Personnel ==
Credits are adapted from Tidal.

- Nate Amos – vocals, production, engineering, mixing
- Howie Weinberg – mastering
- Sarah Amos – vocals on "Billy Came Back", "Watching Heaven Fall", and "The Singer in My Band"
- Bob Amos – banjo on "The Singer in My Band"
- Al Nardo – vocals on "And I Haven't Seen My Love in Quite a While"

== Charts ==
Chart performance for The Singer in My Band
Chart (2026)	Peak position
Croatian International Albums (HDU)	33
Scottish Albums (Official Charts)	28
UK Albums Sales (Official Charts)	33
UK Americana Albums (Official Charts)	8
UK Independent Albums (Official Charts)	15
