= Kevin Cadogan =

American musician (born 1970)

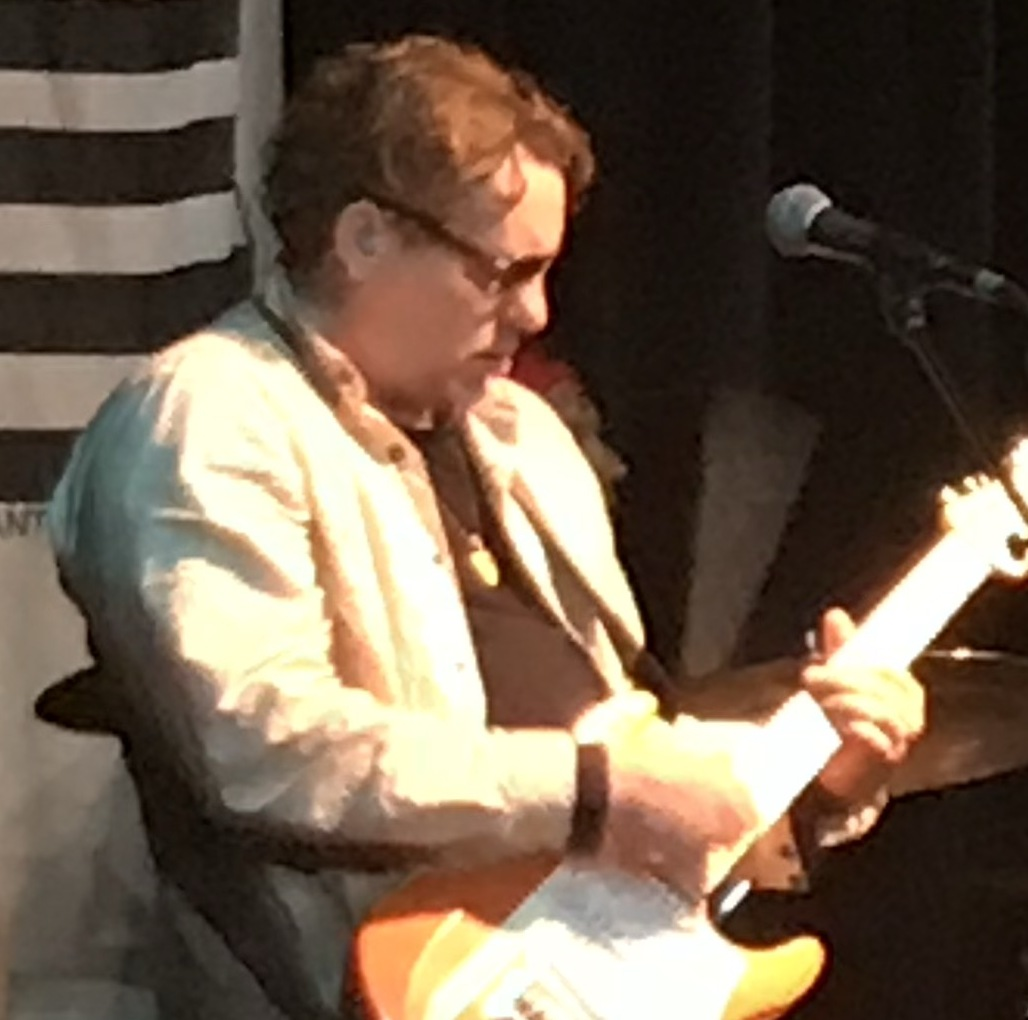
- Cadogan in 2017

Background information
- Born: Kevin Rene Cadogan; August 14, 1970 (age 55); Oakland, California, US
- Origin: Berkeley, California, US
- Genres: Alternative rock
- Occupations: Musician; singer; songwriter; record producer; guitarist
- Instruments: Guitar; vocals
- Years active: 1989–present
- Label: Elektra
- Formerly of: Third Eye Blind
- Website: kevincadogan.com

Kevin Rene Cadogan (born August 14, 1970) is an American musician, singer, songwriter, record producer, and guitarist. A founding member of the band Third Eye Blind, he performed with the band from 1993 to 2000. He co-wrote some of Third Eye Blind's most notable hits, including "How's It Going to Be", "Losing a Whole Year", and "Graduate", ten of the fourteen songs on their debut album Third Eye Blind as well as six of the thirteen tracks on his final collaboration with the band in their second album Blue.

Cadogan and Stephan Jenkins signed a recording contract with Elektra Records in May 1996 which was later reported as the largest recording deal ever for an unsigned artist and launched Third Eye Blind into stardom. In 2011, Cadogan was honored on the show Pensado's Place by record producer Eric Valentine.

== Personal life ==
Born in Oakland, California, Cadogan spent two years in England as a child, while his father taught on sabbatical. Later, the family returned to the United States and settled in Berkeley, California. The Cadogan family maintains their Irish heritage, and Cadogan holds dual American and Irish citizenship. Cadogan's song "Waiting For Me" refers to his close ties to Ireland.

Cadogan attended Berkeley public schools up to his graduation in 1988. Cadogan later attended San Francisco State University, graduating in 1993 with a Bachelor of Arts degree in broadcast communications.

Kevin Cadogan lives with his wife and three children in Berkeley.

== Third Eye Blind ==
Cadogan began learning the guitar at age 12 and began playing in bands shortly after. Like many other guitarists in the Bay Area, Cadogan was a student of guitar virtuoso Joe Satriani. Cadogan was introduced to Stephan Jenkins, who would become his songwriting partner in Third Eye Blind, at a concert in San Francisco in 1993. The two began jamming together before starting to perform as Third Eye Blind in shows around the Bay Area. Cadogan won two California Music Awards for best songwriter along with bandmate Jenkins and was nominated three years in a row as best guitarist in California along with Kirk Hammett from Metallica and Tom Morello of Rage Against the Machine.

According to a New York Times interview, it was Cadogan's understanding that Third Eye Blind was an equal partnership.

Having signed to Elektra Records in 1996, the band released their self-titled debut album the following year. Cadogan co-wrote ten of the 14 songs on the album. The album spawned a number of Billboard Top 10 singles, and the album has sold in excess of six million copies to date. Cadogan was awarded, along with Jenkins, the award for best songwriter at the 1998 California Music Awards. On March 13, 1999, Cadogan presented at the California Music Awards at the Bill Graham Civic Auditorium, San Francisco, California. Third Eye Blind had also won that year for outstanding group.

Cadogan co-wrote six of the thirteen songs on Third Eye Blind's second album, Blue. Subsequently, Cadogan and Jenkins jointly received the award for best songwriter at the 2000 California Music Awards.

=== Departure from Third Eye Blind ===
Cadogan and Third Eye Blind parted ways in January 2000.

According to Cadogan, he was ousted without warning because he did not agree to a deal that would have yielded a $1 million advance to record an EP and start an Elektra Records imprint for which Stephan Jenkins would have full ownership and control.

A major point of contention between Cadogan and Jenkins was an alleged understanding that they were to be equal partners in Third Eye Blind. Despite this alleged understanding, Jenkins established Third Eye Blind Inc. on the eve of the signing of the band's original record deal with Elektra Records in 1996. The contract directed all payments to be paid to Third Eye Blind Inc., effectively making Jenkins the sole "owner" of the band. Cadogan says he was unaware that this change had been made in the contract. Cadogan has stated that upon learning that Jenkins owned 100% of the band, he (Cadogan) refused to sign off on any more recording contracts or loans until shares were also issued to him. In January 2000, Cadogan and Third Eye Blind parted ways after a concert in Utah. Cadogan filed suit alleging wrongful termination, adding that his production, recording, and songwriter royalties were withheld after he was fired from the band. The lawsuit was settled out of court in June 2002, with the terms of the settlement undisclosed.

In 2006, Third Eye Blind released A Collection on Rhino Records. The collection included songs that were co-written by Cadogan from their first two albums. Cadogan was omitted from the band's history in the biography section of the liner notes, and credit for his work was falsely given to Tony Fredianelli, the guitarist who had replaced him. Jude Gold from Guitar Player magazine wrote in his review of the album that omitting Cadogan from the band's history is "like saying Guns N Roses music always profited from the interplay between Axl Rose and guitarist Buckethead". (When Buckethead joined Guns N' Roses, that band already had a well-known history and numerous hit recordings with Slash as lead guitarist.)

== New bands and solo career ==
Cadogan released three solo albums titled Wunderfoot, 12 Nights in Studio A, and Thousand Yard Stare.

In April 2007, Cadogan, Steve Harwell of Smash Mouth and Eric Stock of Stroke 9 formed the band Radio Angel. Eric Valentine agreed to be a producer of their music. They have not performed together since May 2014, but did release two singles, "Come Together" and "Never Turn You Down."

Cadogan made a guest appearance on a recording of Third Eye Blind closing track "God of Wine" with Lovedrug for the band's fan-chosen covers album from the I Am Lovedrug campaign. The album, titled Best of I Am Lovedrug was released June 28, 2011.

On December 19, 2011, Cadogan and original Third Eye Blind bassist Arion Salazar reunited for an opportunity to perform on the television program Backline. Cadogan, Salazar, and Neve's John Stephens performed 12 of their original Third Eye Blind compositions under the new band name "XEB". While audio recordings of this music have surfaced through the band's social media sites, Backline did not include their performance in the show. XEB created a music video for "Graduate" and released a single titled "Out of My Mind" with Cadogan on vocals.

In May 2013, Cadogan and brothers Collin and Chris Livingston formed the alternative rock band Seven Cinematic. Cadogan left the project shortly after its inception following an unsuccessful crowdfunding campaign to help pay for the recording of an album.

On February 1, 2016, Cadogan announced he and Salazar were forming a new band named Cadogan & Salazar. They performed a 20th anniversary concert at the Annex celebrating 20 years since the creation of Third Eye Blind's self titled debut album.

In October 2016, Cadogan & Salazar reverted to the name "XEB" when former Third Eye Blind guitarist, Tony Fredianelli, joined the band as their permanent singer. A number of shows were announced, including an opening slot on a one-off show with Everclear and Tonic.

In 2017, XEB announced a spring and summer tour connected with the 20th anniversary of Third Eye Blind's debut album.

== Discography ==
With Third Eye Blind

- Third Eye Blind (1997)
- Blue (1999)

With Bully

- Bully (2002)

Solo albums

- Bully for You – as Cousin Kevin (2000)
- Coming Back from Yesterday – as Cousin Kevin (2001)
- 12 Nights in Studio A (2002)
- Wunderfoot (2004)
- Thousand Yard Stare (2006)

Solo EPs

- Million Times the Sky (2008)
- All the High Castles (2017)
