= Structure (Water from Your Eyes album) =

Studio album by Water from Your Eyes
- Released: August 27, 2021
- Recorded: 2020
- Genre: Indie pop
- Length: 34:09
- Language: English
- Label: Wharf Cat Records
- Producer: Nate Amos

Water from Your Eyes chronology
33:44 (2020)	Structure (2021)	Everyone's Crushed (2023)

Structure is the fifth studio album by American indie pop band Water from Your Eyes, released on August 27, 2021, through Wharf Cat Records. The album has received positive reviews from critics.

== Recording and release ==
“Structure is the first album we’ve ever been entirely happy with. We think it successfully captures the odd juxtaposition of seriousness and lightheartedness that’s always been at the core of Water From Your Eyes. The album consists of two matching halves, each being a ‘movie’ song, followed by a banger, followed by a spoken word piece, followed by a version of ‘Quotations.’ The whole Structure concept is a funny but functional working mechanism.”

—Nate Amos on recording Structure

Recording for this album was completed immediately before the COVID-19 pandemic and coincided with the two musicians from Water from Your Eyes ending a romantic relationship. The songs on the recording are arranged in a deliberate pattern, inspired by Scott Walker's Climate of Hunter.

== Reception ==
In Paste, Max Freedman scored this album a 7.8 out of 10, stating that this release "finds the band in its catchiest state yet" and characterizing the work "as though Amos and Brown are saying that both sides of the coin have equal weight, that all the pieces of their increasingly complex and exciting puzzle are just as important as one another". Phillipe Roberts of Pitchfork rated this album an 8.0 out of 10, calling the music "cryptic indie pop that hits like a sugar rush" and praising the ability of the band to balance nonsense and sincerity.

== Track listing ==
All lyrics and music written by Nate Amos and Rachel Brown, except where noted.

1. "When You’re Around" (lyrics: Amos) – 3:35
2. "My Love’s" – 6:49
3. "You’re the Embers" – 0:33
4. "Quotations" – 7:06
5. "Monday (lyrics: Amos) – 3:30
6. "Track Five" – 5:54
7. "You’re the Watching Fly" – 0:30
8. "“Quotations”" – 6:16

== Personnel ==
Water from Your Eyes

- Nate Amos – instrumentation, production
- Rachel Brown – vocals, artwork

Additional personnel

- Arthur Grunenberg – illustration
- Matt Norman – horn
- Dan Walker – mastering

== See also ==
- List of 2021 albums
