= Somebody Else's Song =

Studio album by Water from Your Eyes
- Released: October 25, 2019
- Genre: Post-punk; indie pop
- Length: 34:38
- Label: Exploding in Sound
- Producer: Nate Amos; Rachel Brown

Water from Your Eyes chronology
All a Dance (2018)	Somebody Else's Song (2019)	33:44 (2020)

Somebody Else's Song is the second studio album by American indie pop band Water from Your Eyes. It was released on October 25, 2019, through Exploding in Sound.

== Background and composition ==
The title track is a combination of two unfinished This Is Lorelei tracks from summer 2017. “Break” was composed in October 2018 with lyrics finalized and recorded in February 2019. Following the release of Water from Your Eyes' first EP All a Dance in 2018, they released Somebody Else's Song.

== Critical reception ==
Quinn Moreland of Pitchfork would comment on the album saying the songs "focus on the push and pull between the comfort of dreams and a hazy reality.” Tom Alexander writing for Post-Trash described it as more "nuanced" and "radical" than [their] previous work.

Professional ratings
Review scores
Source	Rating
Pitchfork	7.6/10 stars

== Track listing ==
All tracks are written by Nate Amos and Rachel Brown.

No.	Title	Length
1.	"Somebody Else's Song"	3:37
2.	"Break"	9:48
3.	"No Better Now"	5:21
4.	"Look"	0:57
5.	"Adeleine"	4:16
6.	"This Is Slow"	2:36
7.	"Bad in the Sun"	6:38
8.	"Look Again"	1:22

== Release history ==
Release dates and formats for Somebody Else's Song
Region	Date	Format(s)	Label	Ref.
Various	October 25, 2019	Digital download; streaming	Exploding in Sound	
Various	May 10, 2024	Vinyl; LP	Exploding in Sound	
