= Everyone's Crushed =

Studio album by Water from Your Eyes
- Released: May 26, 2023
- Genre: Indie pop
- Length: 31:25
- Language: English
- Label: Matador
- Producer: Nate Amos

Water from Your Eyes chronology
Structure (2021)	Everyone's Crushed (2023)	Crushed by Everyone (2023)

Singles from Everyone's Crushed
- 1. "Barley" Released: 2023

Nate Amos (as This Is Lorelei) chronology
Falls Like Water Falls (2022)	Everyone's Crushed (2023)	Box for Buddy, Box for Star (2024)

Rachel Brown (as Thanks for Coming) chronology
Everyone's Crushed (2023)	What Is My Capacity to Love? (2023)

Everyone's Crushed is the sixth studio album by American indie pop band Water from Your Eyes, released on May 26, 2023. Their debut on Matador Records, the album has received positive reviews from critics.

== Reception ==
Professional ratings
Aggregate scores
Source	Rating
AnyDecentMusic?	8.1/10
Metacritic	84/100
Review scores
Source	Rating
AllMusic	4/5 stars
Exclaim!	8/10
The Guardian	4/5 stars
The Line of Best Fit	8/10
Mojo	4/5 stars
Paste	8.3/10
Pitchfork	8.3/10
PopMatters	9/10
The Skinny	4/5 stars
Under the Radar	8/10

Editors at AnyDecentMusic? rate this release an 8.1 out of 10, based on 14 scores. According to the review aggregator Metacritic, Everyone's Crushed received "universal acclaim" based on a weighted average score of 84 out of 100 from 14 critic scores.

Editors at AllMusic rated this album 4 out of 5 stars, with critic Heather Phares writing the band "level[s] up their genre-mashing sound" with each new album and sums up that this release is their "most consistently gripping music, the cohesion of Everyone's Crushed lends a new vantage point to their music—and it's an exciting one". In Exclaim!, Tom Piekarski rated Everyone's Crushed an 8 out of 10, writing that it has "inescapable charm" and "there isn't a single moment on Everyone's Crushed that isn't crafted to perfection". In The Guardian's 4-out-of-5 star review, Alexis Petridis writes that the band has been able to refine their sound over the past several albums to produce "the only recent album that sounds the way it does". Joshua Mills of The Line of Best Fit exhorts listeners that this album "demands close attention" writing that the band's vulnerability and lyrics "keep us at arm's length, but eager to burrow deep and discover everything this album has to offer". In Paste, Grant Sharples rated this work an 8.3 out of 10 and discussed the band's evolving genres and the chemistry between the two band members, calling them "one of the most innovative, exciting creative partnerships of the moment".

Another 8.3 out of 10 came from Cat Zhang of Pitchfork, where this album was chosen as Best New Music of the week and the reviewer writes that the "music sounds awesome" with "its livewire sound". Marc Hogan at that site also chose alternative Grammy Award nominees and proposed "Barley" for Grammy Award for Record of the Year and the band for Grammy Award for Best New Artist. A 9 out of 10 came from Christopher J. Lee of PopMatters who praised the band for being "inescapably singular" and for the group's high musicianship and ability to experiment. Rolling Stone's editors gave this release the "Hear This" label to highlight it and critic Kory Grow writes that the "chaos" in the band's experimentation "frequently works in the duo's favor". In The Skinny, Tony Inglis gave this work 4 out of 5 stars, stating that "it's pleasingly hard to decipher if the band are at any point saying anything with any sincerity" in a "panoply of wrongfooting sounds". At Stereogum, this was the Album of the Week and reviewer James Rettig wrote that this release digs "more into the abstract side of their sound" than previous albums. In a June round-up of the best albums of 2023, the publication placed this at 14, with Chris DeVille characterizing it as "somewhere between cyberpunk and indie-pop, held together by Brown's bewildered humanity amidst the clatter". Mark Moody of Under the Radar considers Everyone's Crushed "the summer soundtrack for those that hate summery soundtracks" and Water from Your Eyes "one of the most interesting acts in music these days"; he rates this album an 8 out of 10.

In June 2023, Alternative Press published an unranked list of the top 25 albums of the year to date and included this release, calling it "an impeccable balance between leaning into their absurdist sense of humor while creating music that is not only easy to take seriously but is even easier to fall in love with". Editors of Vogue included this in an unranked list of the 22 best albums of the year, published on October 23, 2023, with critic Laia Garcia-Furtado stating that the album is made up of "perfectly messed-up pop music that veers—sometimes sweetly, sometimes violently—from the angelic melodies... to... chaotic beats... and lyrics that reflect modern life's signature disjointedness".

Everyone's Crushed in best-of lists
Outlet	Listing	Rank
AllMusic	AllMusic Best of 2023	—
AllMusic	Favorite Alternative & Indie Albums	—
NME	The 50 Best Albums of 2023	28
Paste	The 50 Best Albums of 2023	36
Paste	The 30 Best Rock Albums of 2023	—
Pitchfork	The 50 Best Albums of 2023	27
Pitchfork	The 37 Best Rock Albums of 2023	—
PopMatters	The 30 Best Rock Albums of 2023	8
Rolling Stone	The 100 Best Albums of 2023	36
Rolling Stone	The 40 Best Indie-Rock Albums of 2023	—
Stereogum	The 50 Best Albums Of 2023	29
Under the Radar	Under the Radar's Top 100 Albums of 2023	36

== Track listing ==
All lyrics and music written by Nate Amos and Rachel Brown, except where noted.

1. "Structure" (music: Amos, lyrics: Brown) – 1:49
2. "Barley" – 3:29
3. "Out There" – 3:20
4. "Open" – 2:54
5. "Everyone's Crushed" – 4:01
6. "True Life" – 3:46
7. "Remember Not My Name" – 3:19
8. "14" – 5:53
9. "Buy My Product" – 2:55

== Personnel ==
Water from Your Eyes

- Nate Amos – instrumentation, production
- Rachel Brown – vocals

Additional personnel

- Ana Fangayen – photography
- Nicole Rifkin – cover illustration
- Molly Styslinger – layout
- Howie Weinberg – mastering

== Crushed by Everyone ==
Crushed by Everyone is a 2023 remix album with outside artists remixing tracks from Everyone's Crushed set for release by Matador on November 17, 2023.

1. "Structure" (The Cradle Version)
2. "Crushed Barley"
3. "Out There" (The Dare Version)
4. "Open" (Sword II Version)
5. "Everyone's Crushed" (Kassie Krut Version)
6. "True Life" (Nourished by Time Version)
7. "Remember Not My Name" (Mandy, Indiana Version)
8. "14" (Jute Gyte Version)
9. "Buy My Product" (fantasy of a broken heart Version)

== See also ==
- 2023 in American music
- List of 2023 albums
