= Skywalker Sound =

Sound and music division of Lucasfilm

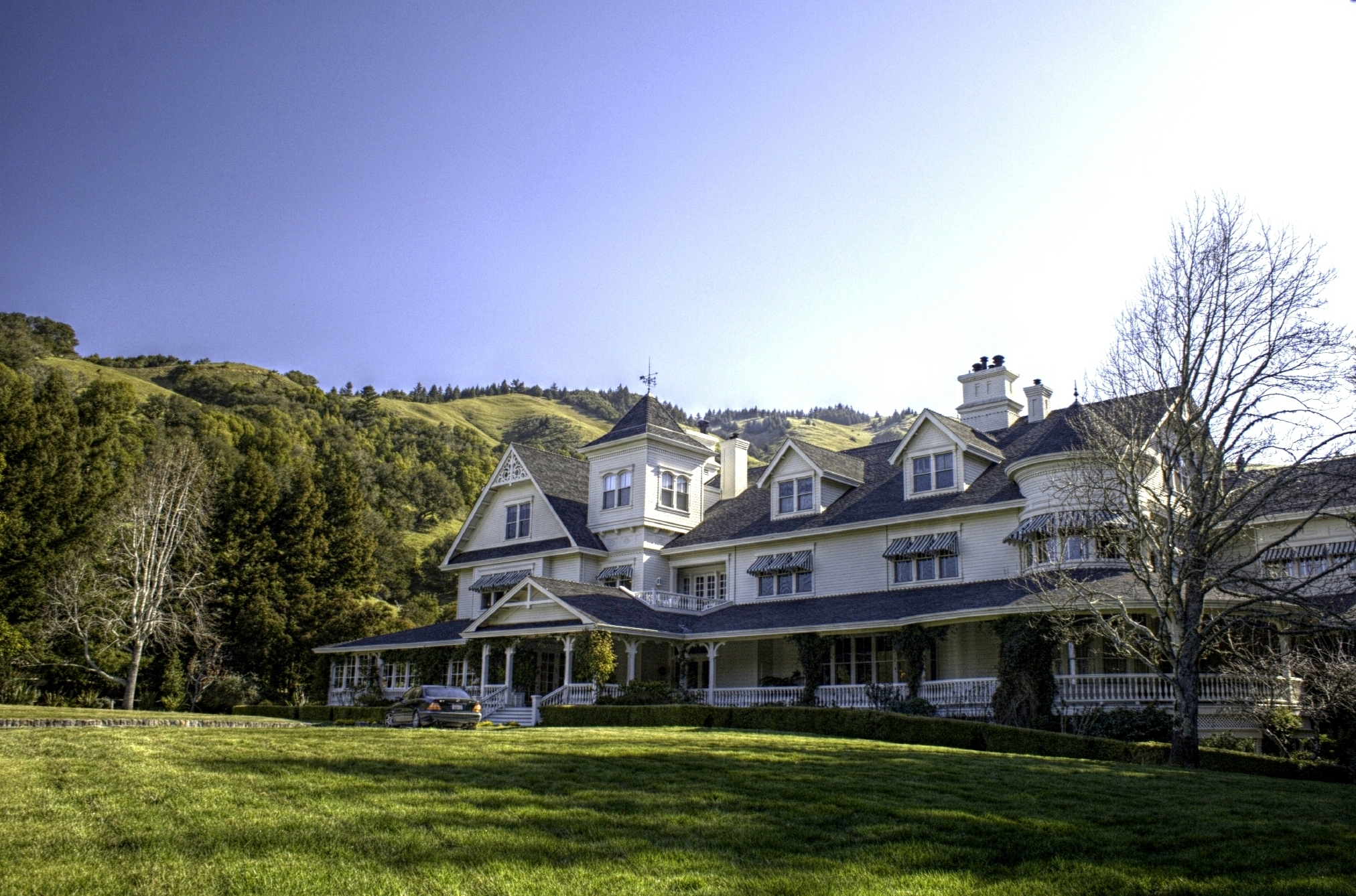
- Skywalker Sound headquarters at the Skywalker Ranch
- Formerly: Sprocket Systems (1975–1987)
- Type: Division
- Industry: Sound effects, Sound editing and Remastering
- Founded: September 7, 1975; 51 years ago
- Founder: George Lucas
- Headquarters: Skywalker Ranch, Lucas Valley, California, United States
- Key people: Josh Lowden (General Manager of Skywalker Sound); Leslie Ann Jones
- Number of employees: 160
- Parent: Lucasfilm
- Website: skysound.com

Skywalker Sound (formerly known as Sprocket Systems) is an American company devoted to sound effects, sound editing, sound design, sound mixing and music recording. Founded in 1975 as a division of Lucasfilm, the company's main facilities are located at George Lucas's Skywalker Ranch in Lucas Valley, near Nicasio, California.

== History ==
Skywalker Sound was founded in 1975 as Sprocket Systems in San Anselmo, California.

While located in San Anselmo, Sprocket Systems occasionally came into contact with residents. For instance, Kentfield resident Pat Welsh was "discovered" while shopping at a camera store and went on to provide the voice for E.T. During the sound recording of Raiders of the Lost Ark, Harrison Ford practiced his bullwhip technique in the parking lot.

Sprocket Systems moved from San Anselmo following a dangerous flood in January 1982. The company changed its name to Skywalker Sound in 1987 after the company moved to Skywalker Ranch.

Skywalker Sound's staff of sound designers and re-recording mixers have either won or been nominated for an Academy Award for Best Sound and Best Sound Editing every year since Star Wars in 1977; in that year, Ben Burtt was given a Special Achievement Award, since the category for Sound Editing had not yet been established. Skywalker Sound has won 15 Academy Awards and received 62 nominations.

Mixing stages, editorial services, and scoring stages are all located in a central "Tech Building", with dining areas and living quarters in the vicinity but separate from the main work area.

In 2012, The Walt Disney Company acquired Skywalker Sound as part of its purchase of Lucasfilm.

== Staff ==
- David Acord
- Christopher Barnett
- Richard Beggs
- Tom Bellfort
- Steve Boeddeker
- Christopher Boyes
- Ben Burtt
- Frank E. Eulner
- Andre Fenley
- Lora Hirschberg
- Richard Hymns
- Leslie Ann Jones
- Ren Klyce
- Dennis Leonard
- Tom Myers
- Gary A. Rizzo
- Gary Rydstrom
- Christopher Scarabosio
- Tom Johnson
- Michael Semanick
- Michael Silvers
- Gary Summers
- Randy Thom
- Gwendolyn Yates Whittle
- Matthew Wood

== Filmography ==
=== 1970s ===
- Star Wars (1977)
- More American Graffiti (1979)

=== 1980s ===
- The Empire Strikes Back (1980)
- Raiders of the Lost Ark (1981)
- E.T. the Extra-Terrestrial (1982)
- Willow (1988)
- Tucker: The Man and His Dream (1988)

=== 1990s ===
- Terminator 2: Judgment Day (1991)
- The Young Indiana Jones Chronicles (1992-1993)
- Jurassic Park (1993)
- Super Mario Bros. (1993)
- True Romance (1993)
- Thumbelina (1994)
- Forrest Gump (1994)
- Baby's Day Out (1994)
- Radioland Murders (1994)
- The Crow (1994)
- Speed (1994)
- A Troll in Central Park (1994)
- Home for the Holidays (1995)
- Casper (1995)
- Se7en (1995)
- Under Siege 2: Dark Territory (1995)
- Species (1995)
- Strange Days (1995)
- My Family (1995)
- Toy Story (1995)
- Jumanji (1995)
- Broken Arrow (1996)
- Mission: Impossible (1996)
- Mars Attacks! (1996)
- Romeo + Juliet (1996)
- The Rock (1996)
- The Frighteners (1996)
- Beverly Hills Ninja (1997)
- Con Air (1997)
- Contact (1997)
- Geri's Game (1997)
- Speed 2: Cruise Control (1997)
- The Lost World: Jurassic Park (1997)
- Titanic (1997)
- Hercules (1997)
- Volcano (1997)
- A Bug's Life (1998)
- Saving Private Ryan (1998)
- Armageddon (1998)
- Quest for Camelot (1998)
- Enemy of the State (1998)
- Stepmom (1998)
- Halloween H20: 20 Years Later (1998)
- Star Wars: Episode I – The Phantom Menace (1999)
- The Iron Giant (1999)
- The 13th Warrior (1999)
- Toy Story 2 (1999)
- Bicentennial Man (1999)
- Fight Club (1999)
- Office Space (1999)
- Galaxy Quest (1999)

=== 2000s ===
- Titan A.E. (2000)
- For the Birds (2000)
- Dinosaur (2000)
- What Lies Beneath (2000)
- Cast Away (2000)
- 102 Dalmatians (2000)
- Chicken Run (2000)
- X-Men (2000)
- Spy Kids (2001)
- Atlantis: The Lost Empire (2001)
- Osmosis Jones (2001)
- Jay and Silent Bob Strike Back (2001)
- Pearl Harbor (2001)
- A.I. Artificial Intelligence (2001)
- Final Fantasy: The Spirits Within (2001)
- Jurassic Park III (2001)
- Monkeybone (2001)
- Monsters, Inc. (2001)
- The Lord of the Rings: The Fellowship of the Ring (2001)
- Ice Age (2002)
- Punch-Drunk Love (2002)
- Minority Report (2002)
- Harry Potter and the Chamber of Secrets (2002)
- The Ring (2002)
- Hart's War (2002)
- The Emperor's Club (2002)
- Lilo & Stitch (2002)
- Mike's New Car (2002)
- Panic Room (2002)
- Star Wars: Episode II – Attack of the Clones (2002)
- Spy Kids 2: The Island of Lost Dreams (2002)
- Adaptation (2002)
- The Lord of the Rings: The Two Towers (2002)
- Maid in Manhattan (2002)
- Boundin' (2003)
- Daredevil (2003)
- Finding Nemo (2003)
- Hulk (2003)
- Star Wars: Clone Wars (2003–2005)
- Pirates of the Caribbean: The Curse of the Black Pearl (2003)
- Peter Pan (2003)
- The Lord of the Rings: Return of the King (2003)
- Shrek 2 (2004)
- The Incredibles (2004)
- The Polar Express (2004)
- Hellboy (2004)
- The Island (2005)
- Star Wars: Episode III – Revenge of the Sith (2005)
- War of the Worlds (2005)
- Charlie and the Chocolate Factory (2005)
- Jack-Jack Attack (2005)
- Munich (2005)
- Lorelei: The Witch of the Pacific Ocean (2005)
- Harry Potter and the Goblet of Fire (2005)
- One Man Band (2005)
- King Kong (2005)
- Cars (2006)
- Monster House (2006)
- Lifted (2006)
- Mater and the Ghostlight (2006)
- Perfume: The Story of a Murderer (2006)
- Charlotte's Web (2006)
- Pirates of the Caribbean: Dead Man's Chest (2006)
- Talladega Nights: The Ballad of Ricky Bobby (2006)
- Zoom (2006)
- Ice Age: The Meltdown (2006)
- Over the Hedge (2006)
- Eragon (2006)
- Open Season (2006)
- Mission: Impossible III (2006)
- Lady in the Water (2006)
- Barnyard (2006)
- Ratatouille (2007)
- Transformers (2007)
- Pirates of the Caribbean: At World's End (2007)
- We Own the Night (2007)
- The Simpsons Movie (2007)
- Aqua Teen Hunger Force Colon Movie Film for Theaters (2007)
- Bee Movie (2007)
- Enchanted (2007)
- Beowulf (2007)
- Surf's Up (2007)
- The Kite Runner (2007)
- Alvin and the Chipmunks (2007)
- Your Friend the Rat (2007)
- Cloverfield (2008)
- WALL-E (2008)
- Hellboy II: The Golden Army (2008)
- Star Wars: The Clone Wars (2008)
- Bolt (2008)
- Indiana Jones and the Kingdom of the Crystal Skull (2008)
- The Incredible Hulk (2008)
- Dr. Seuss' Horton Hears a Who! (2008)
- Zack and Miri Make a Porno (2008)
- Journey to the Center of the Earth 3-D (2008)
- Iron Man (2008)
- Madagascar: Escape 2 Africa (2008)
- Presto (2008)
- The Curious Case of Benjamin Button (2008)
- BURN-E (2008)
- Aliens in the Attic (2009)
- Up (2009)
- Cloudy with a Chance of Meatballs (2009)
- G.I. Joe: The Rise of Cobra (2009)
- Star Trek (2009)
- Avatar (2009)
- A Christmas Carol (2009)
- Terminator Salvation (2009)
- Ice Age: Dawn of the Dinosaurs (2009)
- Coraline (2009)
- Astro Boy (2009)
- Dug's Special Mission (2009)
- Transformers: Revenge of the Fallen (2009)

=== 2010s ===
- Alice in Wonderland (2010)
- Iron Man 2 (2010)
- Percy Jackson & the Olympians: The Lightning Thief (2010)
- Despicable Me (2010)
- How to Train Your Dragon (2010)
- Toy Story 3 (2010)
- The Last Airbender (2010)
- Tron: Legacy (2010)
- Mars Needs Moms (2011)
- Rango (2011)
- Rio (2011)
- Super 8 (2011)
- La Luna (2011)
- Cars 2 (2011)
- Pirates of the Caribbean: On Stranger Tides (2011)
- Mr. Popper's Penguins (2011)
- Rise of the Planet of the Apes (2011)
- Cowboys & Aliens (2011)
- The Adventures of Tintin (2011)
- War Horse (2011)
- Transformers: Dark of the Moon (2011)
- Ice Age: A Mammoth Christmas (2011)
- The Smurfs (2011)
- Journey 2: The Mysterious Island (2012)
- Dr. Seuss' The Lorax (2012)
- ParaNorman (2012)
- Brave (2012)
- The Avengers (2012)
- Ice Age: Continental Drift (2012)
- Madagascar 3: Europe's Most Wanted (2012)
- Flight (2012)
- Red Tails (2012)
- Wreck-It Ralph (2012)
- The Croods (2013)
- Epic (2013)
- Cloudy with a Chance of Meatballs 2 (2013)
- Despicable Me 2 (2013)
- Monsters University (2013)
- The Lone Ranger (2013)
- Iron Man 3 (2013)
- Free Birds (2013)
- Thor: The Dark World (2013)
- The Smurfs 2 (2013)
- Dawn of the Planet of the Apes (2014)
- Rio 2 (2014)
- The Boxtrolls (2014)
- Gone Girl (2014)
- Maleficent (2014)
- Captain America: The Winter Soldier (2014)
- How to Train Your Dragon 2 (2014)
- Lava (2014)
- Lucy (2014)
- Guardians of the Galaxy (2014)
- Big Hero 6 (2014)
- Strange Magic (2015)
- Home (2015)
- The Divergent Series: Insurgent (2015)
- The Little Prince (2015)
- Sanjay's Super Team (2015)
- Inside Out (2015)
- Tomorrowland (2015)
- Avengers: Age of Ultron (2015)
- The Peanuts Movie (2015)
- Jurassic World (2015)
- Minions (2015)
- Bridge of Spies (2015)
- Ant-Man (2015)
- Creed (2015)
- The Good Dinosaur (2015)
- The Walk (2015)
- Star Wars: The Force Awakens (2015)
- The Revenant (2015)
- Pixels (2015)
- The Divergent Series: Allegiant (2016)
- Finding Dory (2016)
- Captain America: Civil War (2016)
- Ice Age: Collision Course (2016)
- The Jungle Book (2016)
- The Secret Life of Pets (2016)
- Zootopia (2016)
- The Angry Birds Movie (2016)
- The BFG (2016)
- Allied (2016)
- Alice Through the Looking Glass (2016)
- Mars (2016–present)
- Moana (2016)
- Doctor Strange (2016)
- Sing (2016)
- Rogue One (2016)
- Native (2016)
- Monster Trucks (2017)
- A Cure for Wellness (2017)
- Lou (2017)
- Kong: Skull Island (2017)
- Guardians of the Galaxy Vol. 2 (2017)
- War for the Planet of the Apes (2017)
- Pirates of the Caribbean: Dead Men Tell No Tales (2017)
- Cars 3 (2017)
- Despicable Me 3 (2017)
- Star Wars Forces of Destiny (2017-2018)
- Only the Brave (2017)
- Mindhunter (2017)
- Thor: Ragnarok (2017)
- Coco (2017)
- Newly Single (2017)
- Ferdinand (2017)
- Star Wars: The Last Jedi (2017)
- The Post (2017)
- Phantom Thread (2017)
- Black Panther (2018)
- A Wrinkle in Time (2018)
- Ready Player One (2018)
- Avengers: Infinity War (2018)
- Bao (2018)
- Solo: A Star Wars Story (2018)
- Incredibles 2 (2018)
- Jurassic World: Fallen Kingdom (2018)
- Ant-Man and the Wasp (2018)
- The Front Runner (2018)
- Next Gen (2018)
- The Old Man & the Gun (2018)
- High Life (2018)
- Dr. Seuss' The Grinch (2018)
- Ralph Breaks the Internet (2018)
- Vice (2018)
- How to Train Your Dragon: The Hidden World (2019)
- Io (2019)
- Alita: Battle Angel (2019)
- The Last Black Man in San Francisco (2019)
- Triple Frontier (2019)
- Captain Marvel (2019)
- Unicorn Store (2019)
- Avengers: Endgame (2019)
- Bolden (2019)
- A Hidden Life (2019)
- Brightburn (2019)
- The Secret Life of Pets 2 (2019)
- Toy Story 4 (2019)
- The Lion King (2019)
- Haunt (2019)
- The Angry Birds Movie 2 (2019)
- 6 Underground (2019)
- Ad Astra (2019)
- Knives Out (2019)
- Star Wars: The Rise of Skywalker (2019)
- Frozen 2 (2019)
- Spies in Disguise (2019)

=== 2020s ===
- Onward (2020)
- The Croods: A New Age (2020)
- Raya and the Last Dragon (2021)
- 22 vs. Earth (2021)
- Luca (2021)
- Shang-Chi and the Legend of the Ten Rings (2021)
- The Green Knight (2021)
- The Suicide Squad (2021)
- Vivo (2021)
- Black Widow (2021)
- Eternals (2021)
- Ciao Alberto (2021)
- Encanto (2021)
- Don't Look Up (2021)
- Sing 2 (2021)
- The Book of Boba Fett
- Turning Red (2022)
- The Ice Age Adventures of Buck Wild (2022)
- Doctor Strange in the Multiverse of Madness (2022)
- Chip 'n Dale: Rescue Rangers (2022)
- Jurassic World Dominion (2022)
- Lightyear (2022)
- Thor: Love and Thunder (2022)
- Paws of Fury: The Legend of Hank (2022)
- Luck (2022)
- Spin Me Round (2022)
- She-Hulk: Attorney at Law (2022)
- Cars on the Road (2022)
- Pinocchio (2022)
- Wendell & Wild (2022)
- Black Panther: Wakanda Forever (2022)
- The Fabelmans (2022)
- Glass Onion: A Knives Out Mystery (2022)
- Strange World (2022)
- Avatar: The Way of Water (2022)
- Ant-Man and the Wasp: Quantumania (2023)
- The Super Mario Bros. Movie (2023)
- Peter Pan & Wendy (2023)
- Guardians of the Galaxy Vol. 3 (2023)
- Elemental (2023)
- Indiana Jones and the Dial of Destiny (2023)
- Ruby Gillman, Teenage Kraken (2023)
- Haunted Mansion (2023)
- The Marvels (2023)
- Wish (2023)
- Migration (2023)
- Inside Out 2 (2024)
- Ultraman: Rising (2024)
- Despicable Me 4 (2024)
- Twisters (2024)
- Deadpool & Wolverine (2024)
- Transformers One (2024)
- The Wild Robot (2024)
- Piece by Piece (2024)
- Here (2024)
- Hitpig! (2024)
- Spellbound (2024)
- Moana 2 (2024)
- Captain America: Brave New World (2025)
- The Electric State (2025)
- Thunderbolts* (2025)
- Lilo & Stitch (2025)
- How to Train Your Dragon (2025)
- Elio (2025)
- F1 (2025)
- Jurassic World Rebirth (2025)
- Superman (2025)
- The Fantastic Four: First Steps (2025)
- One Battle After Another (2025)
- Plainclothes (2025)
- Tron: Ares (2025)
- In Your Dreams (2025)
- Wake Up Dead Man: A Knives Out Mystery (2025)
- Zootopia 2 (2025)
- Avatar: Fire and Ash (2025)
- Hoppers (2026)
- Daredevil: Born Again (season 2) (2026)
- The Super Mario Galaxy Movie (2026)
- Pizza Movie (2026)
- Star Wars: Maul – Shadow Lord (2026)
- Mother Mary (2026)
- Swapped (2026)
- I Love Boosters (2026)
- The Mandalorian and Grogu (2026)
- Disclosure Day (2026)
- Toy Story 5 (2026)
- Minions & Monsters (2026)
- X-Men '97 (season 2) (2026)
- Moana (2026)
- Avatar Aang: The Last Airbender (2026)
- Buddy (2026)
- Forgotten Island (2026)

=== Upcoming ===
- Hexed (2026)
- Behemoth! (2026)
- Ray Gunn (2026)
- Avengers: Doomsday (2026)
- Ahsoka (season 2) (2027)
- Ice Age: Boiling Point (2027)
- Gatto (2027)
- Not Alone (2027)
- Spaceballs: The New One (2027)
