= Nate Amos =

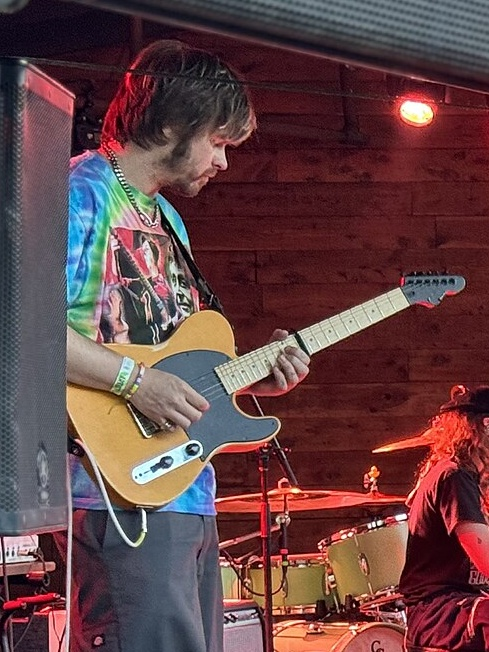
- Nate Amos performing with Water from Your Eyes in 2025

Background information
- Also known as: This Is Lorelei
- Born: Nate Amos; January 8, 1991 (age 35)
- Origin: St. Johnsbury, Vermont, U.S.
- Genres: Rock; electropop
- Occupations: Songwriter; record producer
- Years active: 2012–present
- Label: Matador Records
- Member of: Water from Your Eyes
- Website: thisislorelei.com

Nate Amos (born January 8, 1991), also known as This Is Lorelei, is an American singer, songwriter, record producer, and the lead guitarist and producer of indie pop band Water from Your Eyes.

== Career ==
Amos began using the name This Is Lorelei around 2013, after he relocated to Chicago. In 2015, he met Rachel Brown and formed Water from Your Eyes. Amos released his studio album Box for Buddy, Box for Star (2024), through Double Double Whammy under the name This Is Lorelei. He later announced a deluxe version, which was released on April 25, 2025. He released a follow-up, Holo Boy, on December 12, 2025. The album consists of newly-rerecorded versions of songs he wrote and released between 2014 and 2021. On April 17, 2026, Amos released a "super deluxe" version of Box for Buddy, Box for Star, which includes new covers of the original album's songs. He then signed to Matador Records and announced new tour dates on May 12, 2026. On September 11, 2026, Amos released a new album, The Singer in My Band.

== Personal life ==
Amos lived with his family on a rural mountainside in St. Johnsbury, Vermont. His father Bob Amos and sister Sarah Amos perform as a bluegrass duo, and were featured on the 2026 "Super Deluxe" version of Box for Buddy, Box for Star. As of 2025, Amos is in a relationship with his Water from Your Eyes bandmate Al Nardo.

== Musical style ==
Jake Nevins, writing for Interview Magazine, felt that for Box for Buddy, Box for Star, Amos had decided to "let his stylistic tendencies run free", including "Postal Service-esque electro-pop" on "Perfect Hand", and, in his own words, a "Bruce Hornsby-ass piano" hook on the '80s synth-pop banger "Dancing in the Club”; while Alex Hudson of Exclaim! felt that Box for Buddy, Box for Star had incorporated influences of classic country.

== Discography ==
=== Studio albums ===
Title	Album details
Box for Buddy, Box for Star	Released: June 14, 2024; Label: Double Double Whammy; Format: Digital download, streaming
Holo Boy	Released: December 12, 2025; Label: Double Double Whammy; Format: Digital download, streaming, CD, vinyl
The Singer in My Band	Released: September 11, 2026; Label: Matador; Format: Digital download, streaming, CD, vinyl

=== Mixtapes ===
- This Is This Is Lorelei (2012)
- I You I I You You I (2015)
- Did You Dream It or Did You See It in a Photograph (2016)
- From Static Comes Motion (2017)
- Haystacks! (2018)
- The Mall, the Country (2019)
- The Dirt, the Dancing (2019)
- Move Around (2019)
- Shakes and Stays (2020)
- VII. Seven No. 7 (2020)
- OK N8 (2020)
- Dance (2020)
- Bad Forever (2021)
- Money Right Now (2021)
- Falls like Water Falls (2022)
- Pa$$ion Threshold (2022)

=== EPs ===
- Haystacks! (Light Bringing) (2018)
- Pop 40 Town (2020)
- Jimmy Buffett Tape (2021)
- Love Is Everywhere (2021)
- Stop Making Music (2021)
- EP #19 (2021)
- EP #20 (2021)
- EP #21 (2021)
- EP #31 (2022)
- EP #32 (2022)
- EP #33 (2023)
