= Water from Your Eyes =

American experimental rock band

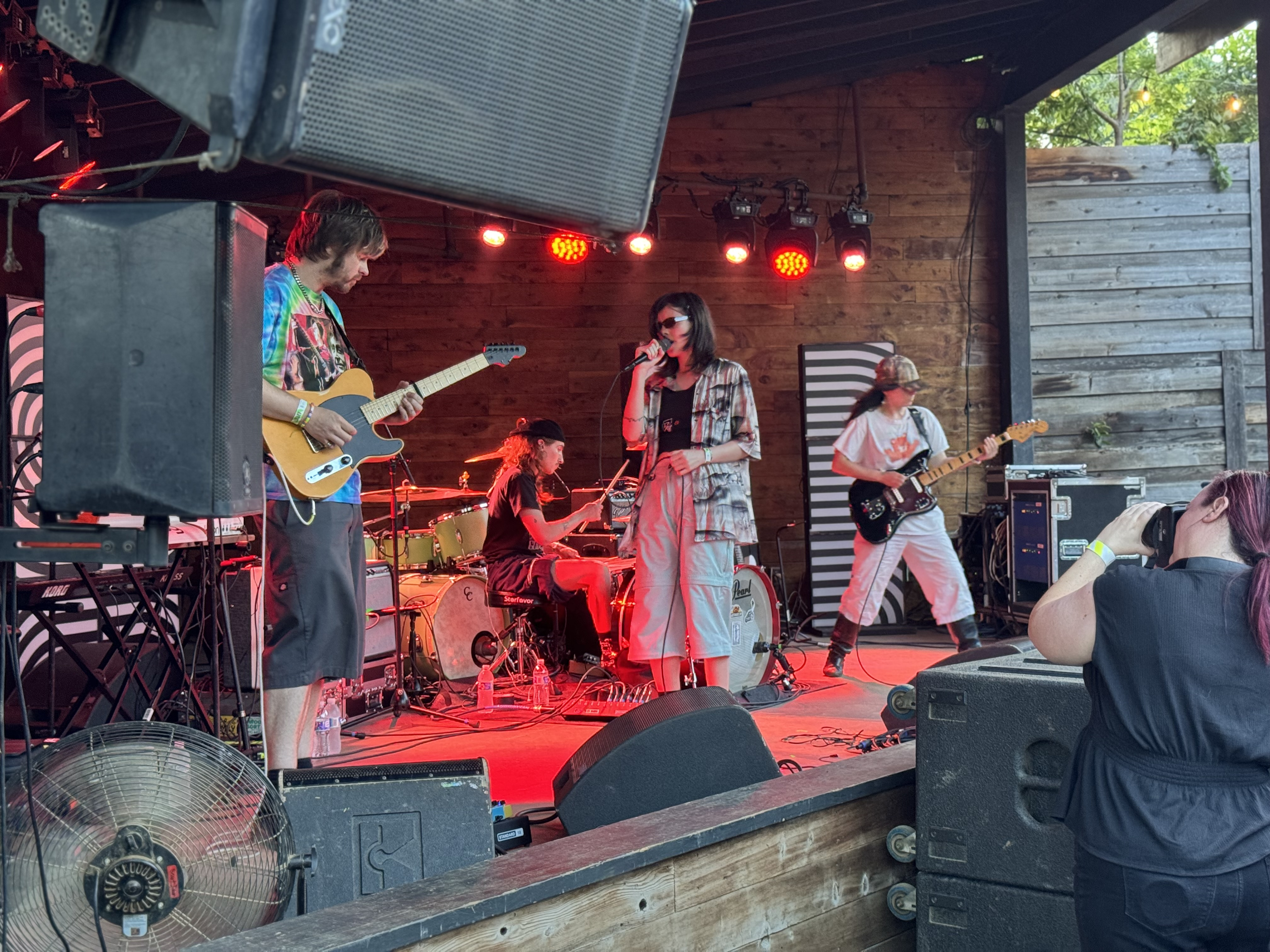
- Water from Your Eyes in 2024

Background information
- Origin: Chicago, Illinois, U.S.
- Genres: Alt pop; art rock; alternative rock; dance punk; experimental pop; experimental rock; indie pop; synth-pop; shoegaze
- Years active: 2016–present
- Labels: Matador; Exploding in Sound
- Members: Nate Amos; Rachel Brown; Bailey Wollowitz (live); Al Nardo (live)
- Past members: Michael Kolb
- Website: waterfromyoureyes.com

Water from Your Eyes are an American experimental rock band formed in Chicago, Illinois in 2016, later relocating to Brooklyn, New York. Their music has been variously described as electro pop, alternative pop, art rock, and indie pop. The group is composed of vocalist Rachel Brown and producer and multi-instrumentalist Nate Amos, and joined in live performances by guitarist/bassist Al Nardo and drummer Bailey Wollowitz, both members of fantasy of a broken heart.

Water from Your Eyes debuted with their eponymous studio album, released in 2016. They would rise to prominence following the release of their album Structure (2021), with a surge in recognition following their signing to Matador Records, which released their albums Everyone's Crushed (2023) and It's a Beautiful Place (2025). In support of the latter album, the band embarked on their first headlining tour in late 2025.

== History ==
=== 2016–2018: Formation, Long Days, No Dreams, Somebody Else's Song ===
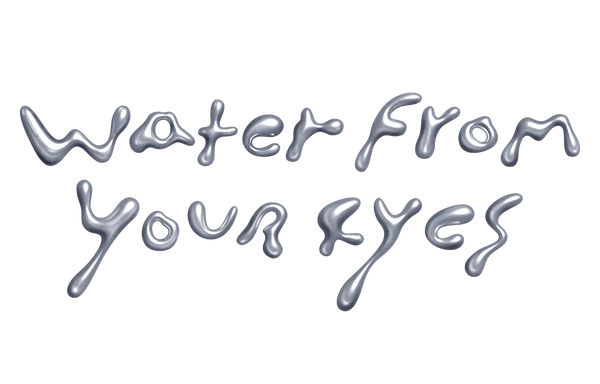
Logo of Water from Your Eyes

Rachel Brown attended New York University in New York City. While on summer break, Brown met Nate Amos at a DIY show occurring in Amos' house in Chicago, Illinois. In an interview, Brown stated the band's name was inspired by English rock band New Order, saying "Nate showed me New Order, and we wanted to make New Order kinds of songs." The duo relocated to Brooklyn, New York. The duo released their debut studio album Long Days, No Dreams in 2017. In 2018, they would release their debut extended play (EP) All a Dance (2018). Later releasing their sophomore studio album Somebody Else's Song in 2019. Which was met with critical acclaim, with Pitchfork's Quinn Moreland commenting on the album's "impressionistic storytelling, dreamy melodies, and Brown’s bittersweet warble." During the pandemic, Water from Your Eyes wrote and released 33:44 (2020), which they noted was different from their other albums.

=== 2021–present ===
The band's fourth album, Structure, was released in 2021. Structure received generally positive reviews from critics. In 2022, Al Nardo joined as second guitarist, followed by Bailey Wollowitz as drummer in 2023. In January 2023, the band announced they had signed to Matador Records. Their album through Matador Records, Everyone's Crushed, was released on May 26, 2023, followed by the remix album Crushed by Everyone that November. On April 20, 2024, Water from Your Eyes opened for Interpol at Mexico City's Zócalo, which was the indie pop band's largest concert ever, having around 160,000 attendees. On June 4, 2025, they released the single "Life Signs" and announced their seventh album, It's a Beautiful Place, which released on August 22, 2025 through Matador Records.

== Musical style and influences ==
Water From Your Eyes cited their influences as American rock band Ween, Scott Walker's 1984 album Climate of Hunter, and the paintings of Mark Rothko. Water from Your Eyes' musical style often covers topics of personal introspection with cynical, often humorous, observations of the modern world. While their genre has been described as alt pop, art rock, post punk, experimental pop, dance-punk, bedroom pop, indie rock, synth-pop, shoegaze, and indie pop.

== Band members ==
Current

- Rachel Brown – vocals
- Nate Amos – guitar, production
- Al Nardo – guitar, bass (2022–present; live performances only)
- Bailey Wollowitz – drums (2023–present; live performances only)

Former

- Michael Kolb – guitar, keyboard (2018–2022; live performances only)

== Discography ==
Studio albums

- Long Days, No Dreams (self-released, 2017)
- Somebody Else's Song (Exploding in Sound, 2019)
- Somebody Else's Songs (self-released, 2021)
- Structure (Wharf Cat, 2021)
- Everyone's Crushed (Matador, 2023)
- It's a Beautiful Place (Matador, 2025)

== Tours ==
- It's a Beautiful Place Tour (2025)
