= Thanks for Everything (EP) =

EP by Third Eye Blind
- Released: August 24, 2018
- Recorded: 2018
- Label: Mega Collider

Third Eye Blind chronology
Summer Gods Tour Live (2017)	Thanks for Everything (2018)	Screamer (2019)

Singles from Thanks for Everything
- 1. "Fuck Forever" Released: June 30, 2018; 2. "Joke" Released: July 13, 2018

Professional ratings
Review scores
Source	Rating
Pitchfork	4/10

Thanks for Everything is an EP by Third Eye Blind. It consists of seven cover songs and was released on August 24, 2018.

== Background ==
After extensive gaps in album releases by the band between their last studio albums, six years between Out of the Vein (2003) and Ursa Major (2009), followed by another six years until Dopamine (2015), Third Eye Blind frontman Stephan Jenkins announced the band would be moving away from full-album releases in favor of more frequent, smaller EP releases moving forward. Jenkins made good on the promise, just a year later releasing the seven-track EP We Are Drugs. The band's next plans included releasing a 2017 EP called Summer Gods, to coincide with a tour of the same name, and would have explored a variety of new sounds for the band, including trap music. However, the EP was not finished in time to be released during the tour, and was instead changed into simply a live album of performances from the tour. In June 2018, it was announced that the next EP was instead to be titled Thanks for Everything, and to consist of seven cover versions of various songs of Jenkins' selection. The change in plans was attributed to, and inspired by, the band's trips to local museums and galleries during the Summer Gods touring, and the proceeds from the EP go towards the Andy Warhol Museum. Jenkins stated that the act of reinterpreting and recording cover songs of various genres that had influenced the band over the years was done to help find inspiration for the creation of a future studio album.

== Composition and themes ==
The EP consists of the band's reinterpretations of seven vastly different musical artists: Happy Diving's "10", Babyshambles's "Fuck Forever", Santigold's "This Isn't Our Parade", Tim Buckley's "Song to the Siren", Chastity Belt's "Joke", Queens of the Stone Age's "In the Fade", and Bon Iver's "Blood Bank". "Blood Bank" is a song the band had previously been performing at live concerts as early as 2012. Consequence of Sound described their version of "Fuck Forever" as "less consciously sloppy than [Babyshamble's frontman Pete] Doherty's original cut" but still having "an anthemic, cathartic feel that's no doubt born from his views on the US's current political climate."

== Release and promotion ==
The EP was first announced on June 22, 2018, alongside the release of the first single, "Fuck Forever". It was released on August 24, 2018.

== Track listing ==
No.	Title	Length
1.	"10" (Happy Diving cover)	3:42
2.	"Fuck Forever" (Babyshambles cover)	3:41
3.	"This Isn't Our Parade" (Santigold cover)	3:40
4.	"Song to the Siren" (Tim Buckley cover)	3:13
5.	"Joke" (Chastity Belt cover)	3:47
6.	"In the Fade" (Queens of the Stone Age cover)	3:45
7.	"Blood Bank" (Bon Iver cover)	3:43
Total length:		26:00

== Personnel ==
Band

- Stephan Jenkins – lead vocals, rhythm guitar
- Kryz Reid – lead guitar
- Alex LeCavalier – bass guitar
- Alex Kopp – keyboards
- Brad Hargreaves – drums

== Charts ==
Chart (2018)	Peak position
US Independent Albums (Billboard)	12
US Top Album Sales (Billboard)	56
US Top Current Album Sales (Billboard)	44
