= Screamer (album) =

Studio album by Third Eye Blind
- Released: October 18, 2019
- Recorded: 2019
- Genre: Pop rock
- Length: 38:43
- Labels: Mega Collider; Megaforce
- Producers: Stephan Jenkins; Colin CreeV; Ryan Olson; Chad Copelin; Jackson Morgan (co.); Fraser McCulloch (co.); Brian Fennell; (co.); P. Cruz (co.)

Third Eye Blind chronology
Thanks for Everything (2018)	Screamer (2019)	Our Bande Apart (2021)

Third Eye Blind studio chronology
Dopamine (2015)	Screamer (2019)	Our Bande Apart (2021)

Singles from Screamer
- 1. "Screamer" Released: July 25, 2019; 2. "Walk Like Kings" Released: September 13, 2019; 3. "The Kids Are Coming (To Take You Down)" Released: October 4, 2019

Professional ratings
Aggregate scores
Source	Rating
Metacritic	49/100
Review scores
Source	Rating
AllMusic	2.5/5 stars
Exclaim!	8/10
Kerrang!	1/5 stars
Pitchfork	6.9/10
Vinyl Chapters	3/5 stars

Screamer is the sixth studio album by the American alternative rock band Third Eye Blind. It was released on October 18, 2019 by Mega Collider Records.

== Background ==
Frontman Stephan Jenkins had made many different comments about the prospect of the band recording a sixth studio album prior to the release of Screamer. As far back as 2012, Jenkins stated that the band would not ever make a sixth studio album, stating that after the release of their fifth studio album, 2015's Dopamine, they would cease recording full albums in favor of touring and recording smaller EP releases. In the coming years, the band would focus on EP releases, including We Are Drugs in 2016, a cancelled EP entitled Summer Gods that was supposed to explore trap music in 2017, and an EP of cover songs, Thanks for Everything, in 2018. Jenkins' stance on recording an album wavered at times in this era, sometimes referring to Summer Gods as an album and explaining that the recording of Thanks for Everything was to find inspiration for recording a future studio album.

As late as November 2018, Jenkins was still referring to the release as an EP, though by May 2019, Jenkins announced it had grown from an EP to a full 10-song studio album. In July 2019, Jenkins announced that it had expanded into an 11-song album titled Screamer, scheduled for release on October 18, 2019.

== Writing and recording ==
Jenkins noted that the album features far more outside collaborations than prior Third Eye Blind albums, with the band adopting an "open door policy" for various artists to contribute ideas to songs. Billy Corgan of Smashing Pumpkins was described as the album's "musical consigliere" (advisor). Jenkins began communicating with Corgan in 2017 after hearing him say on MTV that Third Eye Blind was one of his favorite bands. Jenkins played some song ideas to Corgan, who helped shape some songs. Corgan co-wrote the track "Light It Up" and helped Jenkins with the track "Who Am I".

The album's title track features Alexis Krauss of Sleigh Bells, "Who Am I" contains a contribution from Ryan Olson of Marijuana Deathsquads, and "Got So High" features a contribution from Poliça. Jenkins stated the album's sound deviated from the sound of prior albums as well, aiming for a rougher, less polished sound and emphasizing a mantra of "Keep the edge, keep it weird". Thematically, the album explores the idea of personal revelation and passion in the face of an oncoming dystopia, being inspired by social and political activism of recent years.

== Release and promotion ==
The album was initially planned to be released prior to the band's North American tour with Jimmy Eat World in June 2019, but the album was stuck at only 90% complete at the time and was held back. While the band was unable to promote the album itself on the tour, they still teased the album's upcoming release at live shows and debuted new songs live at various shows, including "Screamer", "The Kids Are Coming", and "Ways". The studio recording of "Screamer" was released on July 25, 2019, the same day as the album's name and release date announcement. The album was one of ten grouped together in the "Ten Albums, One Cause" breast cancer awareness campaign, which involved it receiving a special pink vinyl release.

A music video for "Ways" was released on April 22, 2020, featuring skater and transgender icon Cher Strauberry.

== Track listing ==
No.	Title	Writer(s)	Producer(s)	Length
1.	"Screamer" (featuring Alexis Krauss)	Stephan Jenkins; Colin CreeV	Jenkins; CreeV	2:58
2.	"The Kids Are Coming (To Take You Down)"	Jenkins; Alex Kopp; Kryz Reid	Jenkins; CreeV	2:45
3.	"Ways" (featuring Carlie Hanson)	Jenkins; Jackson Morgan	Jenkins; Morgan (co.); CreeV (co.); Fraser McCulloch (co.)	2:53
4.	"Tropic Scorpio"	Jenkins; Kopp; CreeV	Jenkins; CreeV	3:12
5.	"Walk Like Kings"	Jenkins; CreeV	Jenkins; CreeV	3:26
6.	"Turn Me On"	Jenkins; CreeV	Jenkins; CreeV	4:05
7.	"Got So High"	Ari Ingber; Jenkins	Jenkins; Ryan Olson	3:29
8.	"Who Am I"	Jenkins	Jenkins; Chad Copelin; Olson (co.)	2:32
9.	"Light It Up"	Jenkins; CreeV; Billy Corgan	Jenkins; CreeV	3:48
10.	"2X Tigers"	Jenkins; Brian Fennell	Jenkins; Fennel (co.); P. Cruz (co.)	3:49
11.	"Take a Side"	Jenkins; CreeV	Jenkins; CreeV	2:53
12.	"Who Am I" (acoustic)	Jenkins	Jenkins	2:53
Total length:				38:43

== Personnel ==
Credits are adapted from the liner notes of Screamer.

Third Eye Blind

- Stephan Jenkins – vocals
- Brad Hargreaves – drums
- Kryz Reid – guitar, backing vocals
- Alex LeCavalier – bass, backing vocals
- Colin CreeV – keys, guitar, backing vocals

Other musicians

- Charith Premawardhana – viola
- Kris Donegan – guitars
- Alex Kopp – keys
- Chad Copelin – keys guitar
- Ryan Olson – keys, beats

Technical

- Mitch Allan – vocal production, mixing (12)
- Charles Godfrey – engineering
- Chris Gehringer – mastering
- Chad Copelin – additional engineering
- Bryce Goggin – additional engineering
- Ari Rios – additional engineering
- Sean Beresford – additional engineering
- Ryan Olson – arrangement
- Curtis Peoples – vocal arrangement
- Billy Corgan – song arrangement
- Eric Valentine – mixing (1)
- Neal Avron – mixing (2, 3)
- Tom Lord-Alge – mixing (4–6, 9, 11)
- Jeff Juliano – mixing (7, 8)
- Hector "The Wrks" Merejo – mixing (10)
- Kryz Reid – arrangement (12)

Design

- Daniel Nolan – front and back cover photo/design, additional photos
- Douglas Heusser – album layout
- Ryan Olson – Screamer concept
- Stephan Jenkins – Screamer concept
- Stephen Albanese – additional photos
- Michael Wilson – additional photos

== Charts ==
Chart (2019)	Peak position
UK Album Downloads (Official Charts)	80
US Independent Albums (Billboard)	4
US Top Album Sales (Billboard)	18
US Top Current Album Sales (Billboard)	17
