= Ursa Minor (disambiguation) =

Ursa Minor (little bear) is a constellation of stars.

Ursa Minor may also refer to:

- Ursa Minor (cave), a cave in Sequoia National Park, discovered in August 2006
- Ursa Minor (Third Eye Blind album)
- Ursa Minor (Nana Grizol album), 2017
