= Cop vs. Phone Girl =

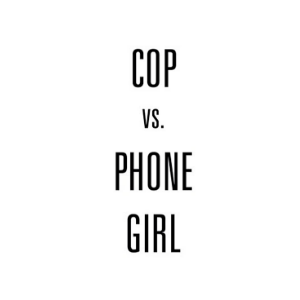

Single by Third Eye Blind

from the album We Are Drugs
- Released: July 25, 2016
- Studio: Sonic Ranch (El Paso)
- Length: 3:26
- Label: Mega Collider; Megaforce
- Songwriter: Stephan Jenkins
- Producers: Stephan Jenkins; Chad Copelin

Third Eye Blind singles chronology
"Get Me Out of Here" (2015)	"Cop vs. Phone Girl" (2016)	"Company of Strangers" (2016)

"Cop vs. Phone Girl" is a song by American rock band Third Eye Blind from their second extended play, We Are Drugs (2016). It was released as the lead single from the extended play on July 25, 2016, by MegaForce Records. The song addresses the issues of racism and police brutality, specifically focusing on a 2015 incident at South Carolina's Spring Valley High School.

Following a viral performance near the Republican National Convention, the band was inspired to release a political song. Frontman Stephan Jenkins helmed the writing and production of the song, with recording and mixing taking place in Texas in the span of a week. "Cop vs. Phone Girl" received mixed reviews from music critics, who praised the message of song but criticized the blunt lyrics.

== Background ==
The song was first released on July 25, 2016, as a means of capitalizing on the band's nationwide publicity the week prior from their comments regarding the Republican Party. On July 19, 2016, the band had played a benefit concert for "Musicians on Call", a charity organization, in close proximity to the Republican National Convention. Band frontman Stephan Jenkins took the opportunity to speak out against the Republican Party, criticizing their views on science and LGBT rights between songs, and performing songs with the band that were specifically critical of their stances, including "Jumper" and "Non-Dairy Creamer". The video of the event went viral, inspiring the band to release a political single as a response.

== Writing and recording ==
The song was written and recorded as part of their We Are Drugs EP, where the band locked themselves in a studio for a week in Texas in mid 2016. The song was one of many that went from inception to finish in that week, in stark contrast to the band's usual approach of recording albums over the course of 4–6 years. The sessions were not particularly politically or socially charged on a whole, but rather, the only theme to the sessions was that there were no boundaries or preconceived notions about the direction of the music.

== Composition ==
The song's lyrics touch on the topics of social justice, police brutality, Black Lives Matter, and racism. The song makes many allusions to a 2015 incident at South Carolina's Spring Valley High School, where a police officer violently removed an African American student from class. Specifically, the song takes a pro-Black Lives Matter stance, with lyrics of "On the classroom floor, there's a little blood splatter / Why's it so hard to say Black Lives Matter? / Doesn't mean that you're anti-white / Take it from me, I'm super fucking white." Jenkins, the band's principal lyricist, stated that the incident had hit him particularly hard due his time prior to being in Third Eye Blind, when he held a job caring for mentally disturbed children at a school. The Spring Valley incident horrified him, because he was always instructed to be cautious and calm with students, even during violent outbursts, in stark contrast to the events at Spring Valley. Despite this, Jenkins still asserts that the song is not meant to be "anti-police", also citing the lines "I am all for the good fight / And if the cops roll by, throw a peace sign."

"Cop vs. Phone Girl" is a mid-tempo, rhythmic singalong-type song.

== Critical reception ==
The music website Stereogum was critical of style of the lyrics, calling them as "handled so bluntly that what should be a meaningful declaration of support ends up sounding like a joke", but ended up conceding that the song's lyrics were a net positive "if it convinces one person to forsake their willfully ignorant and/or racist All Lives Matter rhetoric in favor of empathy." New Noise Magazine described the track as the most "incendiary" song of the summer, calling the lyrics both "nightmarish and uplifting", concluding that it was "a testament to Jenkins' songwriting mastery, he still finds a way to chide hope into a dark narrative, and creates something anthemic out of viscously specific details."

== Credits and personnel ==
Credits and personnel are adapted from the We Are Drugs album liner notes.

- Stephan Jenkins – writer, vocals, guitar, producer
- Brad Hargreaves – drums
- Alex LeCavalier – bass, backing vocals
- Alex Kopp – programming, keyboards
- Kris Donegan – guitar
- Taylor Guarisco – backing vocals
- Tiffany Lamson – backing vocals
- Chad Copelin – keyboards, producer, engineering
- Brian Fennell – keyboards, programming
- Curtis Peoples – additional arrangement
- Sean Beresford – engineering
- Charles Godfrey – assistant engineer
- Mario Ramirez – assistant engineer
- Manny Marroquin – mixing
- Emerson Mancini – mastering
