= Natural Pleasure =

Studio album by Broncho
- Released: April 25, 2025
- Recorded: 2020–2025
- Studios: Norman, Oklahoma
- Genres: Shoegaze, indie rock
- Length: 41:43
- Label: Kung Fu
- Producers: Chad Copelin, Broncho

Broncho chronology
Bad Behavior (2018)	Natural Pleasure (2025)

Professional ratings
Review scores
Source	Rating
AllMusic	4/5 stars
Pitchfork	6.9/10
New Noise Magazine	4.5/5 stars
The Spill Magazine	9/10

Natural Pleasure is the fifth studio album by American indie rock band Broncho, released on April 25, 2025, through Kung Fu Records. It is the band's first album in seven years following Bad Behavior (2018).

== Background and recording ==
Work on Natural Pleasure began around 2020 and continued over several years. The extended timeline was partly influenced by the COVID-19 pandemic and frontman Ryan Lindsey becoming a father.

The album was recorded with longtime collaborator Chad Copelin at his studio in Norman, Oklahoma. The band worked without strict deadlines, allowing songs to develop gradually, with some remaining close to their original forms and others evolving over time.

Several songs originated years earlier; Lindsey stated that "Original Guilt" dated back to sessions around the band's second album before being completed for Natural Pleasure. Lindsey also said that "Save Time" went through an earlier working version before being reworked into the version that appeared on the album.

== Music and style ==
Natural Pleasure represents a stylistic shift from the more rock-oriented sound of Bad Behavior toward a softer, more atmospheric approach. The album has been described as hazy and dreamlike, featuring Lindsey's falsetto vocals alongside layered guitars and a prominent rhythm section.

Critics characterized the album as incorporating elements of shoegaze and indie rock, with reverb-heavy production, described as continuing the sonic direction from the band's earlier album Double Vanity (2016).

Lindsey identified "Imagination", "I Swear", "Surely", and "Way into Magic" as tracks featuring an acoustic guitar that had belonged to his father.

== Release and promotion ==
Natural Pleasure was released on April 25, 2025. The band released the single "Funny" ahead of the album, accompanied by a music video inspired by early 2000s MTV aesthetics.

The album's cover artwork features a grainy image of a bee pollinating a flower. In support of the album, Broncho announced a U.S. tour beginning in June 2025.

== Critical reception ==
Glide Magazine described the album as a "shoegaze-inspired modern pop" release, calling it "consistently entertaining and hypnotic" with layered textures and melodic songwriting.

The Indy Review characterized the album as "a reimagined, grounded, lo-fi dreamscape" and noted its immersive, full-album listening experience.

== Track listing ==
All tracks are written by Broncho.

No.	Title	Length
1.	"Imagination"	4:08
2.	"Funny"	3:57
3.	"Cool"	3:17
4.	"Get Gone"	2:48
5.	"I Swear"	3:23
6.	"Original Guilt"	2:51
7.	"Save Time"	3:05
8.	"You Got Me"	3:36
9.	"Think I Pass"	3:12
10.	"Surely"	3:14
11.	"Way into Magic"	4:46
12.	"Dreamin"	3:26
Total length:		41:43

== Personnel ==
- Broncho
  - Ryan Lindsey
  - Nathan Price
  - Ben King
  - Penny Pitchlynn
- Chad Copelin – production
- Broncho – production
