= Thanks for Everything =

Thanks for Everything may refer to:

- Thanks for Everything (1938 film), a 1938 film by William A. Seiter,
- Thanks for Everything (2019 film), a 2019 film by Louise Archambault,
- Thanks for Everything (EP), a 2018 EP by Third Eye Blind.
