= Xolelwa Nhlabatsi =

Swazi born South African film director

- Born: c. 1987; Mbabane, eSwatini
- Education: University of the Witwatersrand
- Occupations: Film director, producer
- Notable work: Lost in the World (2015)

Xolelwa "Ollie" Nhlabatsi (born c. 1987) is a Swazi born South African film director and producer.

== Biography ==
Nhlabatsi was born in Mbabane, eSwatini. He has a twin sister. Nhlabatsi moved to Washington, D.C. at the age of three, then to Ottawa at age eight. When he was a teenager, he moved with his family to Johannesburg. Nhlabatsi earned a Bachelor of Arts degree in Film & Television from the University of the Witwatersrand. After graduation, he was a post-production assistant at Clive Morris & Bonngoe Productions. Nhlabatsi found a job at the BBC as a production coordinator, then founded his own production company, Blackweather. He has edited several reality TV shows and produced some commercials, as well as making corporate videos for clients such as E! and BET. Nhlabatsi directed a TV film, Ke’Jive for the broadcasting channel Mzansi Magic.

In 2015, Nhlabatsi directed the dark comedy Lost in the World. It focuses on a police officer, played by Honey Makwakwa, whose life is upended when her girlfriend is raped and murdered, and her struggle to find the perpetrators. Nhlabatsi was inspired by Kanye West's song "Lost in the World" from his album My Beautiful Dark Twisted Fantasy. Nhlabatsi based his main character, Whitney, off Helen Mirren's performance as Jane Tennison in the Prime Suspect TV series. The film was screened at the Independent Mzansi Short Film Festival and the Thessaloniki International LGBTQ Film Festival, and was nominated for the Baobab Award for Best Short Film at Film Africa in London. Originally, the film dealt with a heterosexual couple, but Nhlabatsi felt it did not have much meaning. While writing the film's script, Nhlabatsi assisted several foreign journalists who were investigating corrective rape, or the rape of a lesbian in order to make them heterosexual.

In 2019, Nhlabatsi produced the science fiction film Into Infinity. The film tackles the subject of life after death, through the efforts of student Katherine “Kit” Makena to prove its existence. "We are idealists. We want to show the local unique tales and struggles," said Nhlabatsi.

== Filmography ==
- 2012: Ke’Jive
- 2015: Lost in the World
- 2016: New Queer Visions: Lust in Translation
- 2019: Into Infinity (producer, actor)
