= We Are Drugs =

EP by Third Eye Blind
- Released: October 7, 2016
- Recorded: 2016
- Studio: Sonic Ranch (El Paso); Hyde Street Studios (San Francisco); Filthy Hands (Cleveland); Southern Ground (Nashville)
- Genre: Alternative rock
- Length: 26:26
- Label: Mega Collider
- Producer: Stephan Jenkins

Third Eye Blind chronology
Dopamine (2015)	We Are Drugs (2016)	Summer Gods Tour Live (2017)

Singles from We Are Drugs
- 1. "Cop vs. Phone Girl" Released: July 25, 2016; 2. "Company of Strangers" Released: September 8, 2016

We Are Drugs is a studio EP by American alternative rock band Third Eye Blind. Preceded by the singles "Cop vs. Phone Girl" and "Company of Strangers", We Are Drugs was released on October 7, 2016.

== Background ==
As early as 2012, Third Eye Blind frontman Stephan Jenkins stated that following the release of their fifth album, they would cease releasing full albums, in favor of smaller EP releases. After the band released their fifth album, Dopamine, in June 2015, Jenkins stated there were five to six songs from the Dopamine sessions that—once he had time to finish them after the band finished touring to support Dopamine—he would want to release. Several months later, Jenkins began discussing plans for a new EP release in mid-2016.

== Writing and recording ==
Contrary to the band's previous few albums—Out of the Vein (2003), Ursa Major (2009), and Dopamine (2015), which were recorded over the course of four to six years—the band was limited to only one week in a studio in Texas in early 2016 to record We Are Drugs. Jenkins stated that the success of Dopamine finally allowed him to stop obsessing over perfecting lyrics, something he had done in the past. The band focused on continuous sessions that would take a song from conception to completion. No guidelines or definitions of what the music should be or sound like were permitted during the sessions; this allowed the band to create the music they felt in the time they were working on it. Lyrics and vocals for the track "Weightless," however, were completed outside of the initial sessions: Jenkins did not complete either until September 13, 2016—only three weeks before the EP was released.

== Themes and composition ==
Jenkins states that the EP's name is meant to tie into their preceding album Dopamine, with drugs being something that affects one's dopamine levels. Containing lyrics referencing Black Lives Matter, police brutality, and racism, the EP's first single, "Cop vs. Phone Girl," was strongly socially conscious and politically themed. Its lyrics were based on the events of the "Spring Valley High School Incident" in 2015 when a campus police officer violently yanked a Black American student from her seat during class.

The EP's cover art, inspired by Salvador Dalí's Un Chien Andalou, was a collaboration between Jenkins and photographer Travis Shinn.

The EP has musically been described as alternative rock.

== Release and promotion ==
The EP's first single—"Cop vs. Phone Girl"—was released on July 25, 2016 on the heels of the band's entering the national spotlight over their comments about the Republican Party: On July 19, 2016, the band played a benefit concert, in proximity to the Republican National Convention, for Musicians on Call (a charity organization). The band took the opportunity to speak out against the GOP, criticizing the party's views on science and LGBT rights; they played tracks specifically critical of Republican Party stances, including "Jumper" and "Non-Dairy Creamer." The event inspired the band to release a political single. In tandem with the announcement of the EP's track listing and release date, "Company of Strangers," the opening song on We Are Drugs, was released for streaming on September 8, 2016.

The band played the 2016 iteration of Lollapalooza to promote the EP as well.

== Track listing ==
All tracks are written and produced by Stephan Jenkins, except where noted.

No.	Title	Writer(s)	Producer(s)	Length
1.	"Company of Strangers"			3:11
2.	"Queen of Daydreams"		Jenkins; Chad Copelin	4:02
3.	"Don't Give In"		Jenkins; Copelin	3:39
4.	"Isn't It Pretty"	Jenkins; Copelin; Brian Fennell	Jenkins; Copelin	4:05
5.	"Sherri Is a Stoner"	Jenkins; Kryz Reid; Alex LeCavalier		4:12
6.	"Weightless"	Jenkins; Reid		3:51
7.	"Cop vs. Phone Girl"		Jenkins; Copelin	3:26
Total length:				26:26

== Personnel ==
Third Eye Blind

- Stephan Jenkins – lead vocals, guitar (1–4, 7), drums (2, 5), percussion (2)
- Kryz Reid – guitar (1–3, 5, 6), backing vocals (1–3, 5, 6)
- Alex LeCavalier – bass guitar, backing vocals
- Alex Kopp – keyboards (1–3, 5–7), backing vocals (1–3, 5, 6), programming (3, 5, 7)
- Brad Hargreaves – drums (1–5, 7), drum programming (1, 3, 6), backing vocals (5)

Additional musicians

- Chad Copelin – keyboards (2, 4, 7)
- Kris Donegan – guitar (1–3, 5–7)
- Brian Fennell – keyboards (2–4, 6, 7), drum programming (4, 6), programming (7)
- Taylor Guarisco – backing vocals (7)
- Kimiko Joy – backing vocals (5)
- Tiffany Lamson – backing vocals (7)
- Curtis Peoples – additional arrangements (1, 3, 6, 7)

Technical personnel

- Sean Beresford – engineer
- Chad Copelin – engineer (2–4, 7)
- Charles Godfrey – assistant engineer (6, 7)
- Ryan Hewitt – engineer (1, 5, 6), mixing (1–6)
- Michelle Mancini – mastering (7)
- Manny Marroquin – mixing (7)
- Mario Ramirez – assistant engineer (6, 7)
- Dan Shike – mastering (1–6)

== Charts ==
Chart (2016)	Peak position
US Billboard 200	175
US Independent Albums (Billboard)	22
US Top Album Sales (Billboard)	53
US Top Alternative Albums (Billboard)	17
US Top Current Album Sales (Billboard)	57
US Top Rock Albums (Billboard)	27
