= Lost in the World =

Song by Kanye West featuring Bon Iver

from the album My Beautiful Dark Twisted Fantasy
- Released: November 22, 2010
- Recorded: 2010
- Genre: Art pop; worldbeat; hip house; experimental
- Length: 4:16 (album version); 5:55 (full version)
- Label: Roc-A-Fella; Def Jam
- Songwriters: Kanye West; Jeff Bhasker; Malik Jones; Justin Vernon
- Producers: Kanye West; Jeff Bhasker

Music video
- "Lost in the World" on YouTube

"Lost in the World" is a song by American hip hop recording artist Kanye West from his fifth studio album, My Beautiful Dark Twisted Fantasy (2010). The song features vocals by Justin Vernon of indie folk band Bon Iver, as well as sampling his 2009 song "Woods". It also contains portions of "Soul Makossa" written by Manu Dibango, and samples of "Comment No. 1", performed by Gil Scott-Heron. It was produced by West and Jeff Bhasker, who wrote the track with Vernon and Malik Jones. "Lost in the World" was initially leaked on September 29, 2010, and was 5 minutes and 55 seconds long. The version on the album was divided into two parts, with the outro becoming a new track entitled "Who Will Survive in America".

The song received critical acclaim, with praise for its atmospheric production, the appearance of Vernon, and West's verse. The verse by West was described as one of the most poetic of his career, with the song being cited as one of the strongest on My Beautiful Dark Twisted Fantasy. "Lost in the World" was featured during the closing credits of Runaway, a 35-minute short film directed by West set with music from the album. The song peaked at number 104 on the South Korean Gaon Chart. A music video was directed by West and Ruth Hogben, featuring black and white cinematography, frantic dancing by models and a brief cameo by West. The music video received positive reviews from critics.

"Lost in the World" was sampled in a freestyle by West's GOOD Music labelmate Pusha T, and a remix produced by DJ Tiësto. West first performed the song live at Macy's Thanksgiving Day Parade. He notably performed the song with Justin Vernon at both Coachella Festival and Glastonbury Festival. Additionally, the song was performed by West at the funeral of Gil Scott-Heron in 2011.

== Background ==
Kanye West initially wrote the verses of "Lost in the World" as a love poem emailed to American model Kim Kardashian, who he would later begin dating in 2012 and married in 2014. West previewed "Lost in the World" in July 2010 at the offices of Facebook. West performed production-free versions of several songs at the event, standing on top of a table. Rolling Stone writer Daniel Kreps, who reported the event, wrote "in an unorthodox move, Kanye West debuted verses from three new songs, a cappella for employees at Facebook's headquarters in Palo Alto, California." Before launching into a performance of "Lost in the World", West mused that "this is actually a bit more like a poem" and described it as more of a "serious rap". A version of the song leaked online on September 29, 2010; the version was unfinished, with a length of approximately 6 minutes. At this time, it was unknown whether or not the song would appear on West's upcoming fifth studio album. Later, in October 2010, it was confirmed that "Lost in the World" would indeed appear on My Beautiful Dark Twisted Fantasy, but that the leaked version had subsequently been split into two different songs. The first part of the track remained titled "Lost in the World", while the end became another song, titled "Who Will Survive in America".

=== Recording ===
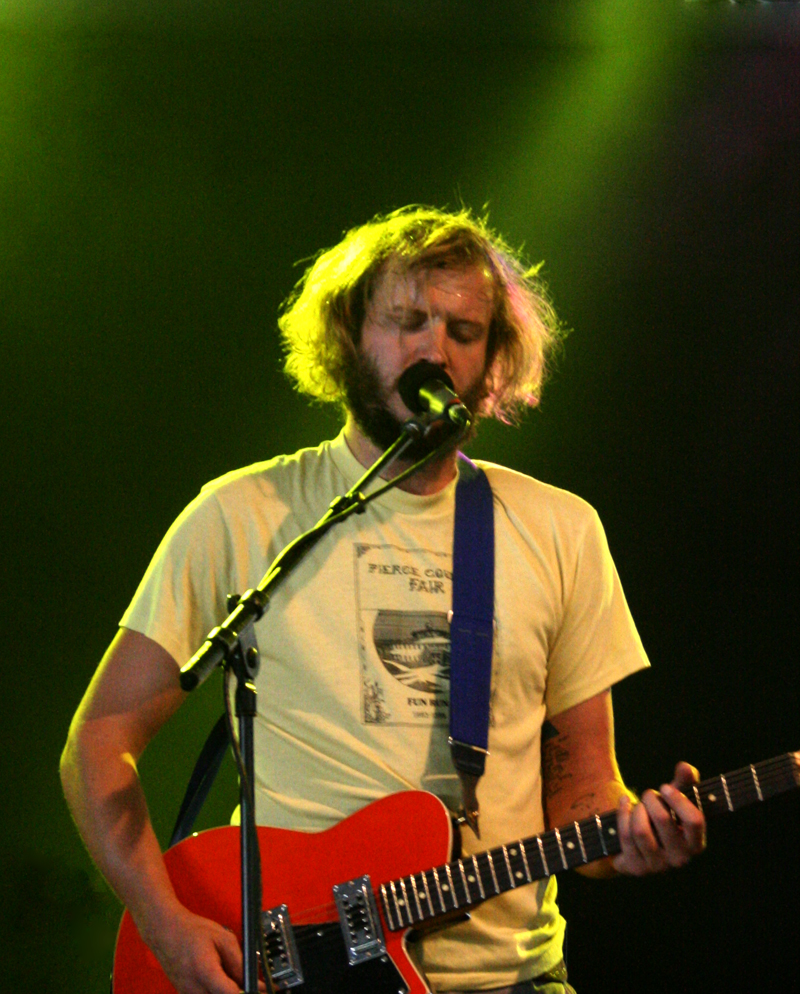
Bon Iver's Justin Vernon was invited by West to his recording studio in Hawaii. Vernon described West as demanding, but mused that the recording process was creative and enjoyable.

Following some media controversies, West chose to record My Beautiful Dark Twisted Fantasy in a reclusive manner in Oahu, Hawaii. Like the majority of the album, "Lost in the World" was composed there. West attempted to shy away from working with artists he didn't consider himself familiar with; however, he made an exception for Justin Vernon, singer of the band Bon Iver. Vernon's involvement in the project stemmed from a phone call by West. West had gotten into contact with Vernon and described his intention of sampling the song "Woods" from Bon Iver's Blood Bank EP. After the phone message, West invited Vernon down to his record studio in Hawaii to appear on the album.

West also cited the Bon Iver album For Emma, Forever Ago as something he was a fan of, and admitted an admiration of the unique aesthetic of Vernon's music. The two quickly became friends through discussions of music and games of basketball. While at Hawaii, Vernon collaborated extensively, reportedly producing a total of ten tracks together, including the album cuts "Dark Fantasy" and "Monster". Vernon told Pitchfork Media about the composition of the song, stating:

"So I head out there and he plays me the track and it sounds exactly like how you want it to sound: forward moving, interesting, light-hearted, heavy-hearted, fucking incredible sounding jam. It was kind of bare so I added some choir-sounding stuff and then thicked out the samples with my voice. That whole first week I was there we worked on the 'Woods' song, which is called 'Lost in the World'. We were just eating breakfast and listening to the song on the speakers and he's like, 'Fuck, this is going to be the festival closer.' I was like, 'Yeah, cool.' It kind of freaked me out."

Vernon recorded his lines in a separate recording studio than most of the album. Vernon described the studio as a "tiny black room". He would record a line in the room, and then shortly later West would come in and play back what was recorded, and then discuss what needed to be changed. They repeated that process a few times until the song was finished. Vernon expressed a positive opinion of working with West, and though he called West demanding in some ways, he appreciated West's enthusiasm for music and the creativity produced by the recording sessions. The song was recorded around the death of Michael Jackson and the event had an effect on the recording crew of the song, and certain aspects of the song are influenced by personal events that affected West throughout the years. In an interview with MTV, West said that the song was going to be the last featured on the album, and commented that "emotionally it just fit the crescendo of everything that I was saying and what I wanted to say to this girl. And it's also my favorite eight bars that I've ever written in my life. I think it's one of the greatest pieces of writing."

== Composition ==
"Lost in the World"
A sample of a bombastic portion of the song's production featuring heavy choirs and tribal drums.

"Lost in the World" is 4 minutes and 16 seconds long and has been described as a "moody meditation". It features tribal drums and samples Bon Iver's "Woods", a song originally written about alienation, applied by West "as the centerpiece of a catchy, communal reverie" on the album. The song manipulates the original Bon Iver sample and incorporates influences from both house music, dance music, jersey club music with its two quarter note kicks, followed by two dotted eighth note kicks and then an eighth note, as well as adding tribal chants and percussion. During the duration of the song, there are several distinct production changes. The song begins with faint vocals delivered by Vernon, which are reinforced by drums, gospel-styled chorus, an increased tempo, and a final measured tempo. The song continues to build at a slow pace, until a choir explodes into a bombastic roar, boasting the line "run from the lights."

West delivers a short, 40 second verse, which appears over two and a half minutes into the song. West's verse contains an interpolation of the "Mama-say mama-sah ma-ma-coo-sah" hook from Michael Jackson's song "Wanna Be Startin' Somethin'". The song features West's comment on his fans and his fame, with additional references to Jackson. Embling of Tiny Mix Tapes viewed that the track points out a paralleled with West and Jackson, commenting:

"Life in the spotlight is perilous, and West knows that what happened to the King of Pop could just as easily happen to him. [...] A disembodied chorus urges West to 'run from the lights/ run for your life' on 'Lost in the World,' the record's frenzied penultimate track; but even as we listen, we know there's little chance that he'll leave the spotlight behind. West is telling us, over the course of 11 songs, that he's willing to die for our amusement, our respect."

"Lost in the World" transitions into the closing track "Who Will Survive in America". The song ends with a very long sample of Gil Scott-Heron's "Comment No. 1", a speech which served as a comment on the 1960s Revolutionary Youth Movement for failing to recognize the more basic needs of the African-American community. It is edited to a smaller version on the track that, according to Chicago Tribune writer Greg Kot, "retains its essence, that of an African-American male who feels cut off from his country and culture". Ann Powers of Los Angeles Times described "Woods" as a "Wisconsin death trip that becomes a testimonial to rebirth through isolation" and noted a significant difference from "Lost in the World", commenting that the song was more about West's "exhausted cry of one who's always new in town, chasing whatever goal or girl is in the room, fueled by consumer culture's relentless buzz, but finally left unsatisfied."

== Reception ==
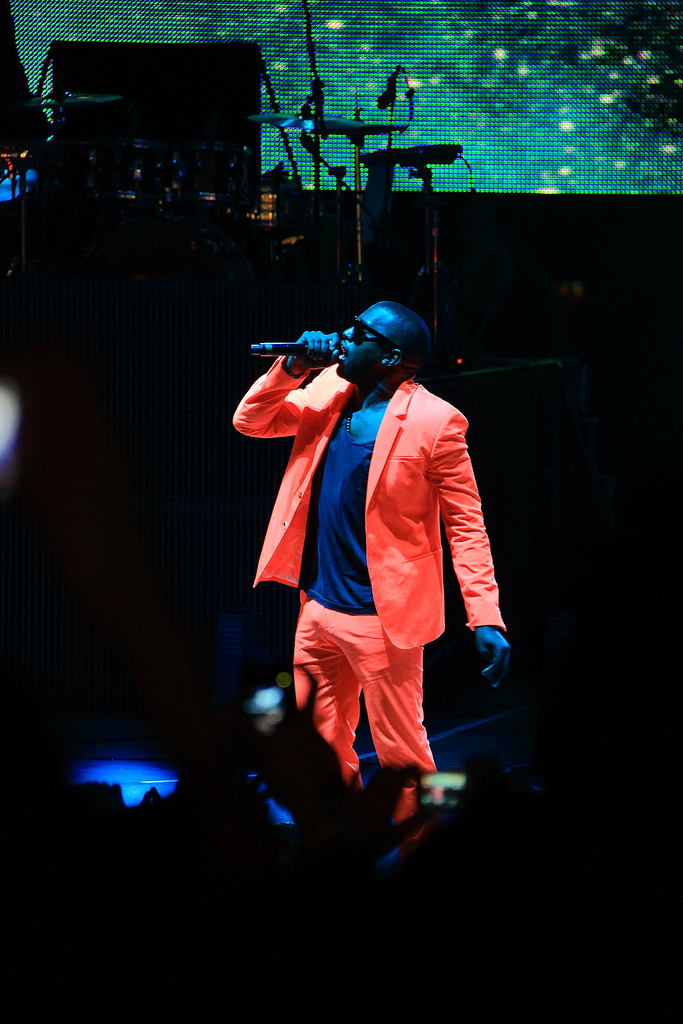
The production by West received acclaim from critics, with several writers commenting that West included production styles not commonly associated with rap music.

The song received widespread acclaim from music critics. Alex Denney NME called the song the "heart-rending highlight" of My Beautiful Dark Twisted Fantasy and cited the vocal performance by Vernon as a "quite brilliant effect." Denney commented "it frames Kanye's inner demons in a universal way, recasting Vernon's semi-mythical woodland retreat as his own cipher for spiritual replenishment". Los Angeles Times writer Ann Powers called the song an important piece of the album, saying that the sampling of Bon Iver was both surprising and inspired, and noted the differences between "Woods" and "Lost in the World". David Amidon of PopMatters viewed that the track contained "glass-shattering bass", and viewed that the track "storms out of all this dreariness with a thunderous, plodding house bass and Kanye taking Bon Iver in every which direction as the song exudes nothing but triumph." Chris Martins of Spin stated that West managed to transform Iver's "melancholic 'Woods' into a perversely bright experimental dance track." Sasha Frere-Jones of The New Yorker commented that the song was difficult to classify as purely a rap song, noting that "West's music is born of hip-hop, but it now includes so many varieties that it feels most accurate to call it simply Kanye." Jones noted than in less than the six minutes of the song's running time, West "moves from a loner in the woods to his own isolation and on to the entire African-American experience."

Andy Gill of The Independent stated that he was impressed that the song was West's only use of autotune on the album, describing the song as both "lovely" and "poignant" in nature. David Browne of Time stated that the song, much like "Runaway", feature "shimmering soundscapes that pinpoint a common ground between the hardness of hip-hop and the sweetness of indie rock." AbsolutePunk's Drew Beringer cited the song as an example of West's growth as a producer, noting that he was sampling unexpected songs to unique results, including the "haunting" song "Woods". Beringer felt that the most interesting take of this on the album was "Lost in the World", describing it as a "as an auto-tuned medley of Vernon and West that soars over pounding drums and a frantic backing choir". HipHopDX writer Jake Paine felt that the track utilized "pounding drums", and commented that it was "an intense tapestry of ever-changing sound that includes several genres and decades of inspiration."

Channing Freeman of Sputnikmusic viewed that track, along with "All of the Lights" and "Power" have "a certain zest of life" to them, adding that all three tracks were "beautiful". He also commented that "it is great to see that Kanye is still able to have plenty of fun without losing any of his creativity." Dan Vidal of URB commented "sonically, the joy comes from the triumphant, painstaking arrangement that undoubtedly went into the production". The Washington Post's Chris Richards mused that "the drums come avalanching on Lost in the World", calling it "the grand finale this album deserves." He continued that "West serves up high drama at a breakneck tempo, with pining melodies crying out for a redemptive moment. But there's no final act of contrition. West is too 'lost in this plastic life.'" Cole Mathew of Slant Magazine described the track as "Kanye's much-anticipated reworking of Bon Iver's "Woods" from his classic EP", and wrote that "it's astounding how he takes the strangest sample on the album and crafts it into a defiantly giddy dance number, complete with tribal drumming in the verses and group choruses that sound massive. It's a mad stroke of brilliance to take Justin Vernon's solitary ode to alienation and use it as the centerpiece of a catchy, communal reverie. It's experimental, to be sure, but it's also the closest the album comes to pure pop indulgence." The song peaked on the South Korean Gaon Music Chart at position 104. In 2017, critics writing for Billboard named the song the fourth best deep cut by a 21st Century Pop Star. In 2019, MTV named it among the best overlooked songs of the decade.

== Marketing ==
=== Live performances ===
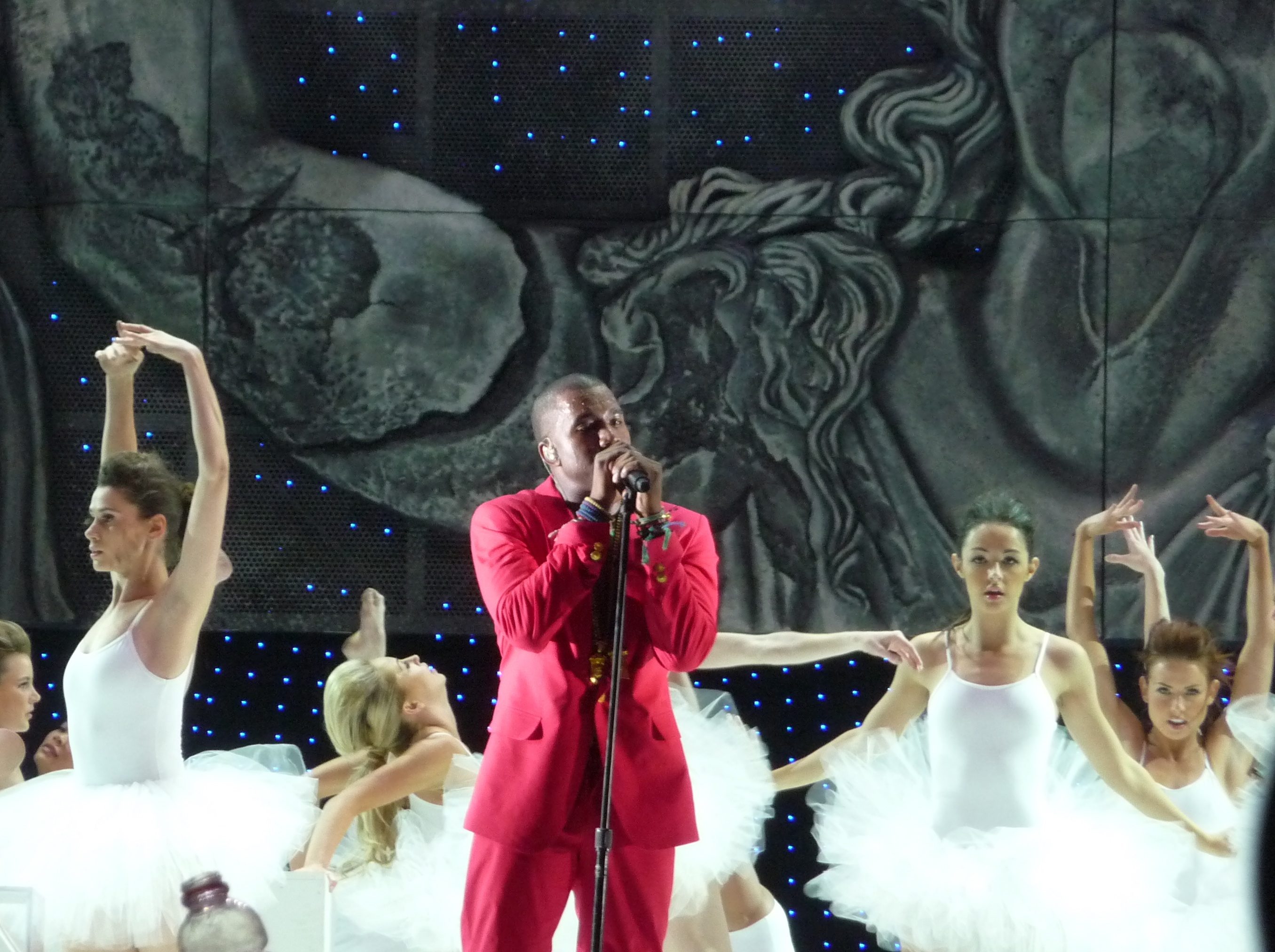
West performing at Coachella in 2011.

To promote My Beautiful Dark Twisted Fantasy, West performed the song at Macy's Thanksgiving Day Parade. During the performance, West wore black peacoat, fur vest, shiny gold shirt, gold chains, and a headband. According to a reviewer from Rap-Up, he was lip syncing the song during the performance. Due to the controversy stemming from the MTV Video Music Awards, it was reported that West was booed during the performance. The booing garnered press coverage and was reported by several publications. During his set at the Coachella Valley Music and Arts Festival, West performed "Lost in the World" towards the end of his performance. Justin Vernon joined Kanye during the performance, and it was described as "one of the most memorable performances in Coachella history." The track was featured during West's set at the Big Chill music festival. At the festival, West announced plans for the song to be the fifth single from the album, however plans to do so never surfaced. West performed "Lost in the World at Gil Scott-Heron's funeral in 2011.

=== Miscellaneous ===
The song appears in West's short film Runaway, an extended 35-minute-long music video which features a majority of the tracks featured on My Beautiful Dark Twisted Fantasy. The song plays during the video's climax, and features West frantically running through the forest. Rapper Pusha T released a promotional remix of the track with verses provided by him. A dance remix by Grammy nominated DJ Tiësto was produced in 2011, that was "apparently been sitting around Tiësto's hard drive for the past year", and was finally put up to download as part of a podcast in April 2012. The remix took over a year to be released, but was finally allowed to be released for undisclosed reasons. Consequence of Sound writer Chris Coplan reported that the remix had a duration of around eight minutes, commenting that "the formerly artsy number is chopped and screwed into a bass-heavy club anthem, with the emotionally-frozen vibe melting to the sheer heat produced by random samples and various chunky synth lines."

== Music video ==
A screenshot of West's cameo appearance in the video. West dances around in the video, which has been noted for its sharp black and white cinematography.

A music video was made by fashion film director Ruth Hogben in collaboration with West, who appears in a cameo in the video. The video was shot during the summer of 2011 during a two-day shoot. Hogben and West had brainstorming sessions deciding what the video was going to be conceptually, finally deciding something that would aesthetically fit the song the best. About collaborating with West, Hogben commented that the process was very organic and creative in nature, musing that the two went back and forth with ideas for visuals. The dancers in the video were not instructed to dance in any particular way by Yemi A.D. who was in charge of the dance choreography; and according to Ruth Hogben, they "wanted an interpretation of how they felt about the song to be portrayed instead." The video was eventually released May 4, 2012. The video was described as "belated" because it was premiered nearly a year and a half after the initial release of the album "Lost in the World" accompanies.

The black-and-white clip opens with a warning that "strobe effects are used in this video" and features a group of models dressed in sheer fabric dancing while West poses during his verse. West's face is actually not shown anywhere in the video, which mostly showcases "tortured and slick mirrors and skylines, with a well-placed dancer depicting the heaven and hell in which the rapper wallows." According to Belinda White of The Daily Telegraph, it features designers Gareth Pugh and Rick Owens, stylists Katie Grand and Katie Shillingford and "brands such as Louis Vuitton, Barneys, Mac Cosmetics and Selfridges." Director Hogben mused that ultimately people "are supposed to come up with their individual interpretations of the clip." Kia Makarechi of The Huffington Post offered her interpretation of the video, writing:

"In the black and white video -- which West made with filmmaker Ruth Hogben -- post-rocker Bon Iver's haunting intro plays over images of a model in sheer fabric. When the rapper appears, he's standing on a mirrored platform -- seeing only himself when he looks down. He's 'lost in the world,' grounded by a reality that's isolated and clouded (via wind and fog machines)."

HitFix's Katie Hasty viewed that video played out more like a fashion clip than an actual music video, but mused that it was a probable result considering the past of the director. Hasty commented that it was a "gorgeous way to sell the song." Robbie Daw of website Idolator compared the Nick Knight cinematography to the style featured in the music video for Lady Gaga's single "Born This Way" (which was directed by Nick Knight) and wrote that "the black-and-white extravaganza is a rap video unlike any others released in recent memory — well, unless you count Kanye's last off-the-wall clip." Luis Tovar of Pretty Much Amazing compared the video to the trailer of The Dark Knight Rises, and called it "totally Kanye". Popdust writer Katherine St Asaph described the video as an artistic "black-and-white cut that disorients you with lots of falling and flailing and flailing-called-interpretive-dance, with billowing smoke and sudden shifts in art direction", commenting that the video was a welcome change of pace.

== Personnel ==
- Produced By: Kanye West
- Co-Produced By: Jeff Bhasker
- Recorded By: Andrew Dawson, Mike Dean, Noah Goldstein, Anthony Kilhoffer at Avex Recording Studio, Honolulu, Hi; Electric Lady Studios, NYC
- Engineer: Brent Kolatalo
- Mix Engineer: Anthony Kilhoffer
- Assistant Mix Engineers: Pete Bischoff, Alex Graupera, Christian Mochizuki
- Keyboard: Jeff Bhasker
- Additional Drum Programming: Mano
- Chant Vocals: Ken Lewis and Alvin Fields
- Additional vocals: Elly Jackson, Alicia Keys, Tony Williams, Kaye Fox, Charlie Wilson, and Justin Vernon

== Charts ==
Chart (2011)	Peak position
South Korea (Gaon Chart)	104

== Certifications ==
Region	Certification	Certified units/sales
United States (RIAA)	Gold	500,000^{‡}
^{‡} Sales+streaming figures based on certification alone.
