= Dinah Johnson =

American children's writer (born 1960)

Dinah Johnson (born Dianne Johnson, August 6, 1960), also known as Dianne Johnson-Feelings, is an author and professor of English. She has written books on the history of Black children's literature, and is most notable for her own children's books, which focus on African-American culture and her home state of South Carolina.

== Early life and education ==
Johnson was born in Charleston and graduated from Spring Valley High School in Columbia, South Carolina. She earned her undergraduate degree in English and creative writing from Princeton University and master's and doctoral degrees from Yale University, in Afro-American Studies and American Studies, respectively.

== Career ==
Johnson's first published book was called Telling Tales: The Pedagogy and Promise of African American Literature for Youth and was published in 1990 by Greenwood Press. In it, Johnson writes about the history of children's literature aimed at young Black readers, as well as Black authors. A review for the African American Review called it "a much needed resource for children's literature". Her book was also considered for several years as "the only book-length critical study of early black children's literature". She also edited The Best of The Brownies' Book, an anthology published in 1996 with texts from The Brownies' Book, a 1920s magazine aimed at African-American children. While critics commented some children might enjoy reading it, they noted it was "a major contribution to the field of children's literature."

Johnson's children's books have been generally praised by critics. Quinnie Blue, published in 2000, was featured in a Time Magazine list as one of the year's best books, as well as in the Black Caucus of the American Library Association's top 20 books. Her 2022 book, H is For Harlem, received starred reviews from several publications, and was praised for its historical representation of the Harlem and some of its monuments and notable people.

She currently works as a professor of English at the University of South Carolina.

== Personal life ==
Johnson was the second wife of illustrator Tom Feelings, with whom she had a daughter.
