= Ursa Minor (Third Eye Blind album) =

Unreleased studio album

Studio album by Third Eye Blind
- Released: Unreleased
- Recorded: 2004–2011
- Genre: Alternative rock
- Producer: Stephan Jenkins

Ursa Minor is an unreleased studio album by American alternative rock band Third Eye Blind. Initially conceived as the second part of a double album to their 2009 release Ursa Major, the album was delayed, and eventually shelved, due to legal issues between frontman Stephan Jenkins and then-guitarist of the band Tony Fredianelli. The subsequent re-staffing the band with mostly new members in 2011 and 2012 led Jenkins to shy away from releasing the material, stating that it no longer represented the current band lineup - though comments from as recent as 2015 have alluded to releasing some of the music online eventually as well.

== Background ==
Information on an album titled Ursa Minor arose as early as March 2009, from Billboard magazine. The band later revealed more upon discussing the release of their then upcoming fourth studio album, Ursa Major, in May 2009 with Billboard. The band had been working on material sporadically since their prior album, Out of the Vein, had been released in 2003, and had accumulated a wealth of material, leading to the plan of releasing it all as a double album; Ursa Major and Ursa Minor. Fredianelli described the original concept:

"It's kind of like the big dipper and the little dipper. It's not necessarily like the big songs on Ursa Major. There's going to be some great songs on Ursa Minor, too. It's just a matter of how they fit together in the collage. Certain songs share certain spots on the record. Records are kind of like a piece of art, you don't want to add too much blue, ebbing and flowing through. It seems like the two records are fitting together in a certain way.

However, with work on Ursa Minor material not being complete, plans changed to releasing them as two separate but companion type fourth and fifth albums. Ursa Major was released on August 18, 2009, with Ursa Minor having a tentative release scheduled for later in the same year. However, focus on touring in support of Ursa Major pushed the release back, while work on the album continued through 2010 and 2011. In April 2010, Brad Hargreaves stated that they were continuing to flesh out the material for it, and in July 2010, the band announced they had re-entered the studio to continue work on the album. By January 2011, the band had returned to touring, though Jenkins continued to state at concerts that the band was planning on returning to the material to complete Ursa Minor.

== Aftermath and future ==
By the end of 2012, it was reported that Jenkins had ultimately dropped the Ursa Minor album idea. Jenkins revealed that the change in plans had been a result of changes in band members since the release of Ursa Major. Much of Ursa Major and Ursa Minor had been written with guitarist Tony Fredianelli, who after the release of Ursa Major, sued the band for missing song-writing credits and publishing royalties for Ursa Major and the Red Star EP. Fredianelli had many of the claims dismissed, but ultimately still won over $400,000 from the band for lost wages in touring in support of Ursa Major. With his departure stemming from the lawsuits, he was replaced with guitarist Kryz Reid. The band also recruited new bassist Alex LeCavalier - the position had previously been filled by various session and touring members - and Alex Kopp, the band's first dedicated keyboardist. In 2013, Jenkins stated that, after all the said events, the material no longer reflected the current state of the band, and declared it "shelved" at the time, with the possibility of release in the future. The band's eventual fifth album, Dopamine, released in June 2015, had no connection to any material from Ursa Minor. In July 2015, Jenkins reiterated this stance, stating that although the material no longer represented the band's current form, he also felt that the individual songs were so strong, that he intends on potentially releasing them online on a track by track basis.

== Track listing ==
No.	Title	Length
1.	"Now I Don't Know"
2.	"Stevie Ray Vaughan"
3.	"Carnival Barker (full)"
4.	"In the Skin"
5.	"Second Born"
6.	"Lay Back"
7.	"Away"
8.	"Standing Up For You"
9.	"Captains of Emo"
10.	"Swimming"

== Personnel ==
Band

- Stephan Jenkins - lead vocals, rhythm guitar
- Tony Fredianelli - lead guitar, backing vocals
- Brad Hargreaves - drums
