= Blood Bank (EP) =

EP by Bon Iver
- Released: January 20, 2009
- Recorded: December 2006 – June 2008
- Studios: Hunting lodge (Dunn County, WI); Ticonderobics (Raleigh, NC); Chris and Jesse's apartment (Montreal, QC); Otter Creek Rd. (Fall Creek, WI); Small house (Eau Claire, WI)
- Genre: Indie folk
- Length: 16:54
- Label: Jagjaguwar
- Producer: Justin Vernon

Bon Iver chronology
| For Emma, Forever Ago (2007) | Blood Bank (2009) | Bon Iver (2011) |

Singles from Blood Bank
- 1. "Blood Bank" Released: 2009

Professional ratings
Review scores
| Source | Rating |
|---|---|
| AbsolutePunk | 91% |
| AllMusic | 3.5/5 stars |
| The A.V. Club | B+ |
| Drowned in Sound | 8/10 |
| The Observer | (favorable) |
| Paste | 85% |
| Pitchfork | 7.9/10 |

Blood Bank is a 2009 EP by Bon Iver. It was released on January 20, 2009, and features four tracks, three of them recorded for the release. The EP is a follow-up to the band's award-winning debut album For Emma, Forever Ago, self-released in 2007 by Bon Iver frontman and founder Justin Vernon, and re-released in 2008.

== Information ==
The title track was written with the previous album but didn't "feel right" and was not released.

"Woods" was sampled in Kanye West's single "Lost in the World" from his 2010 album My Beautiful Dark Twisted Fantasy, and re-recorded as "Still" by Justin Vernon's side-project, Volcano Choir, for their debut album Unmap. It was featured in a Series 3 episode of Skins.

Jagjaguwar has said the following about the content of the EP:

As much as Emma is about the cold, the Blood Bank collection is about the warmth that gets you through it. You can feel the air move. Like a fire you've been stoking for hours and finally got to sustain itself, the heat blisters your face while your back is frozen solid.

The EP entered the Billboard 200 at No. 16 with 23,000 copies sold. 79 percent of the sales were digital. As of October 2009 it has sold 89,000 copies in United States according to Nielsen SoundScan.

A reissue of the EP with both the original songs and their live versions was released on March 27, 2020.

== Track listing ==
All tracks are written by Justin Vernon.

| No. | Title | Length |
|---|---|---|
| 1. | "Blood Bank" | 4:45 |
| 2. | "Beach Baby" | 2:40 |
| 3. | "Babys" | 4:44 |
| 4. | "Woods" | 4:45 |
| Total length: | | 16:54 |

Tenth anniversary reissue
| No. | Title | Length |
|---|---|---|
| 5. | "Blood Bank (Live from Ericsson Globe, Stockholm SE, Oct 31 2018)" | 5:45 |
| 6. | "Beach Baby (Live from The Bomb Factory, Dallas TX, Jan 23 2018)" | 3:04 |
| 7. | "Babys (Live from Eventim Apollo Hammersmith, London UK, Mar 4 2018)" | 6:21 |
| 8. | "Woods (Live from Pitchfork Paris Presented by La Blogothèque, Nov 3 2018)" | 3:27 |

== Personnel ==
Bon Iver

- Justin Vernon

Additional personnel

- Mark Paulson — nylon guitar (track 3), recording
- Lauren Hudgins — front cover photo
- Ashley Farland — back and inside photos

== Charts ==
| Chart (2009) | Peak position |
|---|---|
| Australia (ARIA Hitseekers) | 8 |
| Irish Singles Chart | 24 |
| UK Singles Chart | 37 |
| UK Indie Chart | 1 |
| US Billboard 200 | 16 |

== Certifications ==
| Region | Certification | Certified units/sales |
|---|---|---|
| United Kingdom (BPI) "Blood Bank" | Silver | 200,000^{‡} |
^{‡} Sales+streaming figures based on certification alone.

== Cover versions ==
The Tallest Man on Earth recorded a version of "Blood Bank" for his 2022 album of covers, Too Late for Edelweiss.

Architects (UK band) recorded a version of “Blood Bank” for their 2013 deluxe edition release of their album Daybreaker.

The Mountain Goats recorded a version of "Blood Bank" on their 2018 EP for an Aquarium Drunkard "Lagniappe Session".

Third Eye Blind recorded a version of "Blood Bank" for their 2018 EP Thanks for Everything (EP).
