= For Emma, Forever Ago =

Studio album by Bon Iver
- Released: July 8, 2007
- Recorded: November 2006 – January 2007
- Studios: Hunting cabin in Northwestern Wisconsin; Fairall, Raleigh, North Carolina (add.)
- Genres: Indie folk; alt-country; country folk; ambient
- Length: 37:14
- Labels: Jagjaguwar; 4AD
- Producer: Justin Vernon

Bon Iver chronology
For Emma, Forever Ago (2007)	Blood Bank (2009)

Initial self-released cover

Singles from For Emma, Forever Ago
- 1. "Skinny Love" Released: April 28, 2008; 2. "For Emma" Released: September 15, 2008; 3. "re: Stacks" Released: December 15, 2008

For Emma, Forever Ago is the debut studio album by American indie folk band Bon Iver. It was first self-released in July 2007, and later saw wide release on the Jagjaguwar label in February 2008. The album is principally the work of singer-songwriter Justin Vernon. While living in Raleigh, North Carolina, Vernon fell ill with mononucleosis and a liver infection, and grew frustrated with his songwriting and life. He left Raleigh and drove to his father's remote hunting cabin an hour northwest of his hometown, Eau Claire, Wisconsin, hoping to be alone.

The album was recorded at the cabin between late 2006 to early 2007. Vernon abandoned his old songwriting methods and instead focused on wordless melodies that he later set to words, which he felt evoked a more subconscious meaning. The record's lyrical subjects include lost love and mediocrity. His folk-infused songs include heavy choral arrangements, featuring Vernon's falsetto, and horns. He hunted his own food and spent much of his time isolated. Though he did not intend to make an album, he received strong encouragements from friends and decided to self-release For Emma, Forever Ago in July 2007. After several performances and online exposure, he was signed to Jagjaguwar later that year.

For Emma, Forever Ago attracted wide acclaim from music critics, achieving a spot on dozens of end-of-the-year lists, as well as several awards. It became a major commercial success for Jagjaguwar, an independent label, and has been certified platinum by the Recording Industry Association of America (RIAA), for combined sales, streaming and track-sales equivalent of over one million units. "Skinny Love" became the album's best-performing single and also went gold. Vernon gathered together several musicians to form a band to tour with. The album's touring cycle lasted two years, ending in late 2009, and visited several countries and music festivals worldwide. In 2020, it was ranked 461 on Rolling Stone's list of the greatest albums of all time.

== Background ==
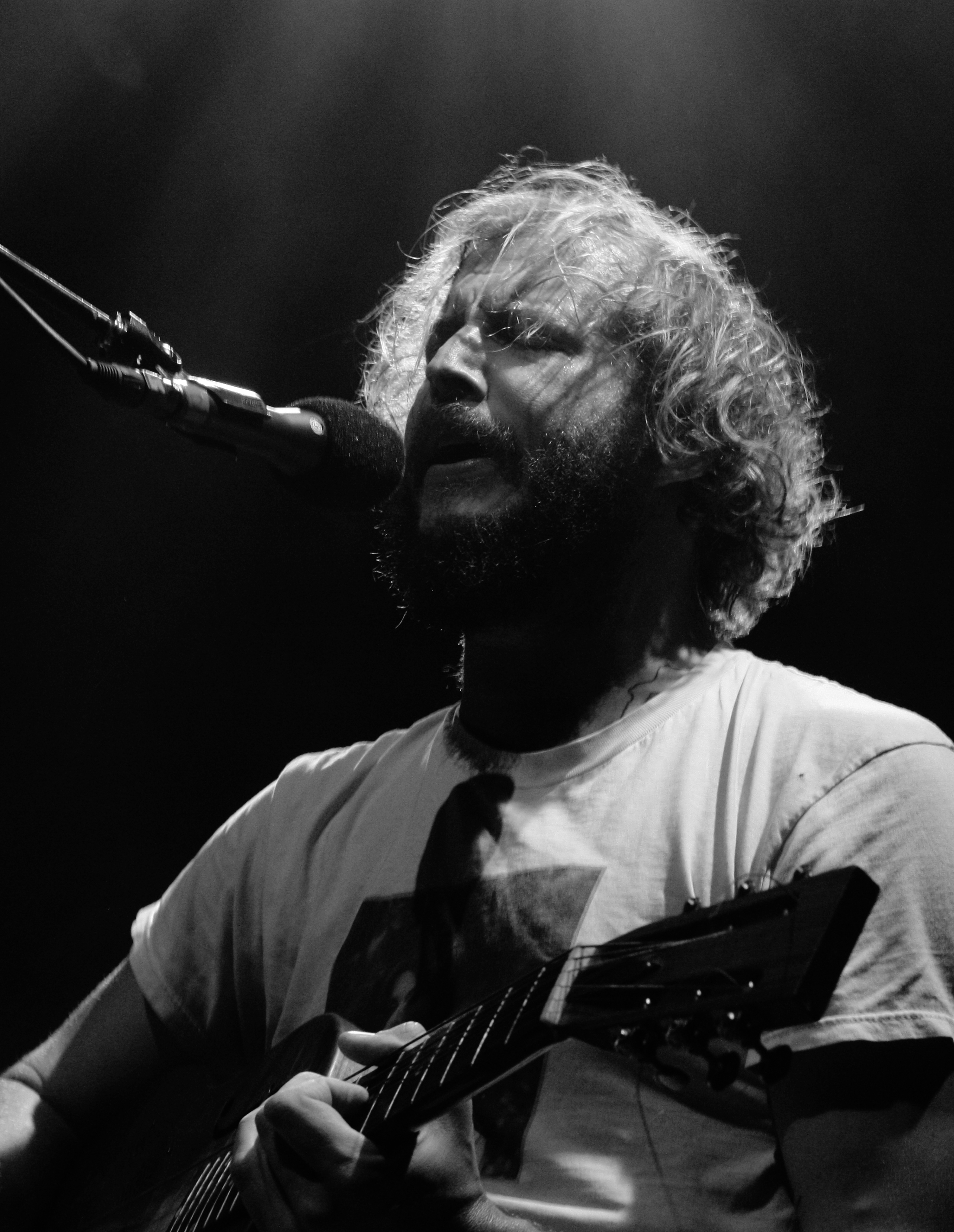
Justin Vernon performing in 2009.

Justin Vernon was born in Eau Claire, Wisconsin, and grew up pursuing music. He saw the folk duo Indigo Girls in concert in middle school and it proved formative on his life. He attended the University of Wisconsin–Eau Claire (UW–Eau Claire), where he played in a number of bands. One such group, Mount Vernon, consisted of ten members, including saxophonist Sara Jensen, who became his first love. He and Jensen broke up in the middle of his college years, but would remain friends. He studied music theory for a time, as well as jazz, but ended up with a degree in religious studies. DeYarmond Edison became his next musical project, as he graduated from college and relocated to Raleigh, North Carolina, in August 2005. The group chose Raleigh hoping for an adventure and a more vibrant musical scene.

Over the course of his time in Raleigh, he became frustrated with his songwriting as well as his personal life. He worked at a local sandwich shop that he felt took too much time from him. He started to have health problems: he first contracted pneumonia, then mononucleosis, which developed into a liver infection that kept him bedridden for three months. Members of the band began to fight, and Vernon was kicked out of the group. Many of his bands had held similar members—some he had known since his adolescence—which amplified the pain of breaking apart. Afterwards, he spent time as a band member for The Rosebuds; his contributions feature on their third album, Night of the Furies. Vernon also recorded a solo EP, Hazeltons, which he distributed in 100 self-made CD-Rs. He lost his money playing online poker, which he viewed as a microcosm for his other problems.

Vernon, then 25, felt his life had spiraled into mediocrity, as though he had lost the sense of purpose he had a lustrum prior. He sensed he had compromised with bandmates and in his personal life. His depression was fueled by indifference, and he decided to get away from Raleigh and return to his hometown. He broke up with his then-girlfriend, Christy Smith, and tossed his recording equipment into the trunk of his car. He drove home to Eau Claire over eighteen hours through the night. He first stopped at his parents' home while they were out. He sat on their couch and felt "claustrophobic" and "super-empty." He returned to the road, in search of silence and hoping to be alone.

== Recording and production ==
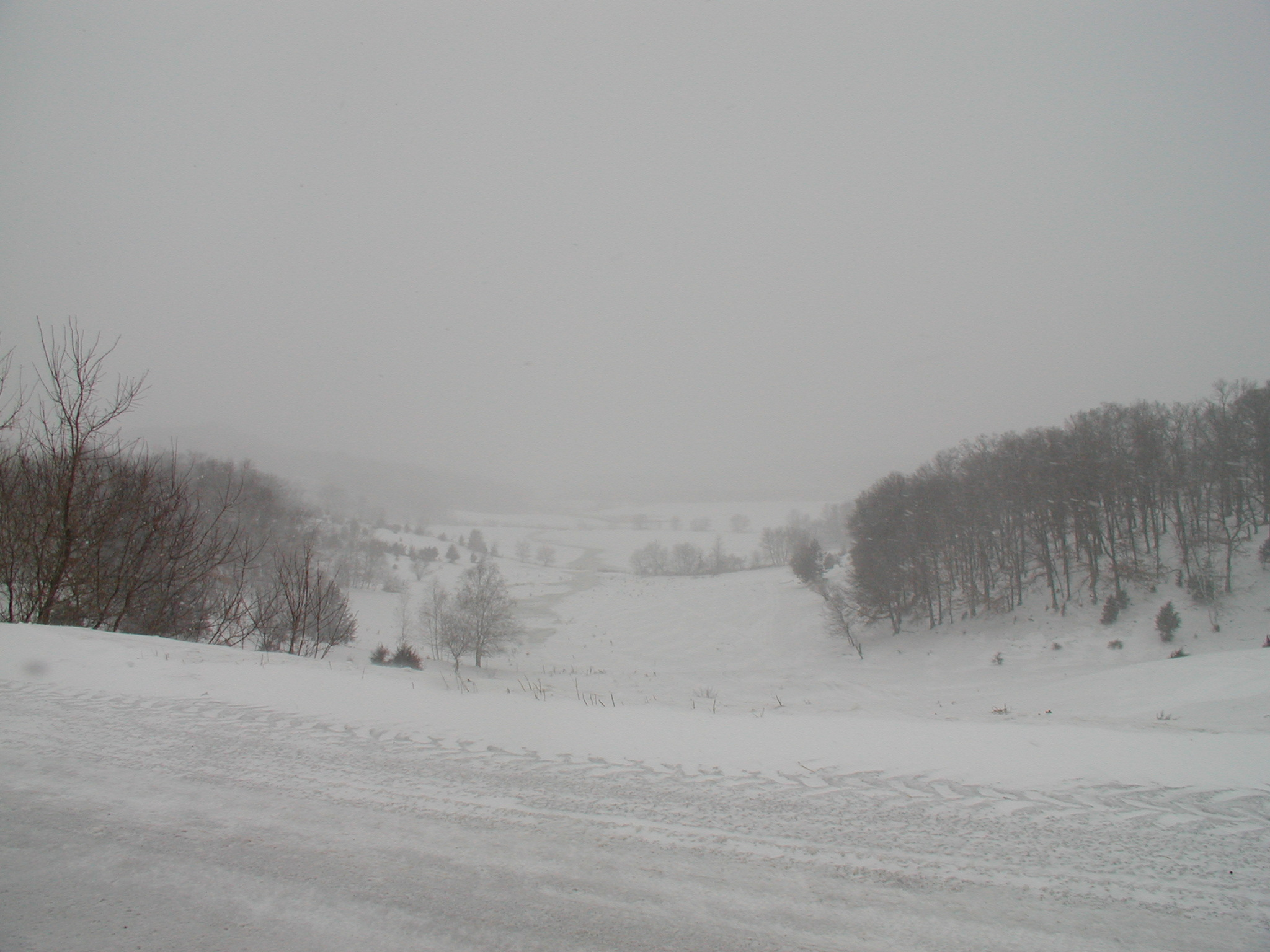
Snow scenery in Eau Claire County, Wisconsin.

Vernon drove to his father's hunting cabin, roughly an hour's drive northwest of his hometown. He and his father had often spent weekends at the 80-acre rural property—an area they dubbed "the land"—when he was growing up. In an interview, he described it as "a little Alpine style, timber-frame cabin." The cabin was not necessarily ramshackle; his father had replaced its dirt floor and installed plumbing years before. For roughly three weeks, Vernon sat alone in the shack, drinking beer and watching television. He mulled over thoughts about his relationship with Jensen, a break-up he had struggled to get over. He hunted his food, a practice that he had learned from his father. He killed two deer in his period at the property, which lasted the entire three months "and then some," according to Vernon. At one point, he faced a wild bear that entered the cabin late one night, enticed by his stew. His father would drop by "every 10 days or so," supplying his son with beer, eggs, and cheese. Vernon completed tasks for him, such as stripping wood, clearing brush, and stacking lumber. He did not intend to stay for long, viewing the excursion as "an opportunity to escape the trap of society, to not pay bills, to play music and live really cheaply." Instead, he stayed for three months in the harsh Wisconsin winter.

I arrived at the cabin in November, so there's a very big winter theme for everything when I was there. On a physical level, I would wake up to stoke the fire or get wood chopped to get it in the house to keep warm. Just winter in general was kind of a part of where I was physically and metaphysically as well. It bled into the music naturally. I had nothing but the sound of my own thoughts, and they were really loud when that's all that was going on.

— Justin Vernon on his isolated winter

After three weeks, Vernon grew tired of his "self-indulgent, lazy behavior" and began forming song ideas. He had an idea for a song and brought inside his musical equipment, which consisted of several guitars, microphones, and a Power Mac G4 with Pro Tools LE. Shortly before exiting Raleigh, he had developed song ideas but ceased working on them in his depression. He began recording songs and layering his vocals atop more vocals, imitating a choir. He sang in falsetto, which he had first tried with his previous band. He gained freedom in singing in a higher register, feeling he accessed "painful melodies" unattainable in his previous work. He further manipulated his recorded vocals using the software Auto-Tune. Soon, he began developing more songs, which were worked on in 12-hour "bursts" of productivity. "I would work for 14 hours a day and start to feel a little insane," he later commented. The work was "labor-intensive," as he often merged eight or more tracks of vocals on each song. He likened the singularity of the process to his teenage years, where he worked alone with an eight-track. According to Vernon, days were hazy and began to run together for him. He would wake each morning at sunrise, due to the light reflecting from the snow. To help repair his 1964 Sears Silvertone guitar, he traded venison in the nearby town. By February, with winter drawing to a close, Vernon emerged from the cabin with nine songs. He left still feeling physically sick from the infection, and did not feel "renewed" from his creative catharsis. Before heading back to Raleigh, he broke out some whiskey with a couple friends and put the finishing touches on the record, recording brass on "For Emma."

While stories of the "cabin" would become oft-repeated and mythologized, Vernon never viewed it that way: "It's sort of odd to look back and see it as magical, because it felt like a lonely few months at the cabin, where I plugged in the laptop and fucked around." Rolling Stone's Josh Eells later summarized its romanticized story as "part Into the Wild, part Basement Tapes, part Walden, part Unabomber." Vernon later viewed the album as a victory for his mental health, a metaphor for taking "personal steps" to improve his life. He characterized his growth as a "small internal dialogue between me and the microphone." The album's title comes from Jensen's middle name, though he refrained from confirming that she was the central inspiration behind the album. He felt the titular "Emma" was evocative of "a statement, a sentiment and a closing of my own history." He went more in-depth in a later remark: "Emma isn't a person. Emma is a place that you get stuck in. Emma's a pain that you can't erase."

== Composition and music ==
This lonesome post-break-up album is drenched in the kind of melancholy that feels a lot like joy, and sounds just as vivid. Rather than wallowing in loss, Vernon’s otherworldly falsetto and warm acoustic guitar provide a hopeful contrast to lyrics like "Saw death on a sunny snow." It was less like the end of a relationship and more like the promise of a new beginning.

— Josh Jackson of Paste Magazine (May 20, 2020)

For Emma, Forever Ago is a summation of Vernon's life events at the time, ranging from "lost love and longing" to mediocrity. His lyrics on the album aspire to tell stories, which was inspired by musician Bruce Springsteen, and the song structures are unorthodox. He discarded his old method of songwriting, both metaphorically and literally: on one occasion, an old PowerBook crashed, losing dozens of unfinished old songs. Vernon buried the laptop in the snow, later remarking, "They were taken from me but it was good that they were, as it really gave me a new face." Music came first, after which he would create wordless vocal lines. He felt this process brought forth "weird, subconscious melodies and sounds." He considered this method a "back-door way," as they fit more to his unintelligible syllables than words.

He expanded upon this process in a 2008 interview:

I'd go back and record a melody, and then if I liked the first line but didn't like the second line, I'd go back and record syllables of a melody. So I'd have the melody, then I'd double that with the new syllables. And it kinda sounds like jargon: two people saying different things. And I'd do that for all the songs, then I'd go back and listen to them about 20 times and write down what I thought I heard. It would be different every time. I compiled them and, at the end, it was very interesting for me; it was very freeing. I found all this shit, all this grudge and meaning in what I was singing, these syllables.

"Flume"
"Flume", the first completed song from the album, showcases quiet, acoustic guitar and Vernon's falsetto singing.

Vernon listened to little music while creating the album, but was inspired by myriad sources. He had listened to Vienna Boys' Choir recordings months prior, which inspired him to incorporate choral arrangements into his work. He also felt inspired by Appalachian folk singers who employed the falsetto register, which inspired him to use his. As a result, he felt more comfortable singing certain complicated phrases, as though he could express pain or joy more clearly. He suggested in one interview it could have been a reaction to his favorite black singers, such as the Staple Singers, Mahalia Jackson, and Sam Cooke. "Flume" was written at his girlfriend Christy Smith's house in Raleigh, preceding his trip to the cabin. He later dubbed "Flume" as the "catalyst" for his move to the cabin and creation of Bon Iver: "that was the song that made me leave." While "Skinny Love" has been considered a reference to his relationship with Smith, Vernon countered this as "not entirely accurate [...] it's about that time in a relationship that I was going through; you're in a relationship because you need help, but that's not necessarily why you should be in a relationship. And that's skinny." "re: Stacks", meanwhile, concerns a period of problem gambling Vernon underwent.

== Release ==
After completing the recordings, Vernon returned to North Carolina to play guitar on tour with The Rosebuds, who toured through that spring. It took several months for him to have thoughts on his recordings, which he viewed as potential demos that he would later re-record. However, Ivan Howard of The Rosebuds convinced him to leave them as is, commenting "This is your record." He consulted friends to listen first before deciding to self-release it. He mixed his recordings himself and with Nick Peterson of Track & Field studios in Chapel Hill, NC then hoping to send them out to labels who would give him an advance to record a "real" album. While at the cabin, Vernon had written to Kelly Crisp of The Rosebuds, concluding his letter with "bon iver," a misspelling of "bon hiver," which is French for "good winter." Its origins lie in an episode of Northern Exposure, wherein two characters greet one another. Crisp encouraged him to name the project Bon Iver. While on tour with the Rosebuds, he asked to play a small solo set, his first, prior to a performance at that year's South by Southwest (SXSW). Encouraged, more performances followed in New York and in Wisconsin.

For Emma, Forever Ago was first self-distributed on MySpace on June 1, 2007, and gradually became an independent hit throughout that year. My Old Kentucky Blog was the first to popularize the record. A release party was held at the House of Rock in Eau Claire on July 8, 2007, marking the album's CD debut. It was a limited run of 500 copies, as Vernon had no idea who would be interested. He intended to send out 100 copies to press outlets. Positive reviews increased within weeks, from music blogs such as BrooklynVegan and Pitchfork. An appearance at the CMJ Music Marathon in New York increased Vernon's popularity among music blogs such as Stereogum, and he began to see offers to release the album from record labels. According to Vernon, major labels were "desperate" to sign him, offering contracts in which he chose the deal. He chose to sign with independent label Jagjaguwar in late October 2007 because he liked the label's president, Chris Swanson, who had first opened communication in the summer, and its Midwest roots. 4AD would distribute the album in Europe.

== Critical reception ==
Professional ratings
Aggregate scores
Source	Rating
Metacritic	88/100
Review scores
Source	Rating
AllMusic	5/5 stars
The A.V. Club	A−
The Guardian	4/5 stars
Mojo	5/5 stars
MSN Music (Consumer Guide)	C+
Pitchfork	8.1/10
Q	4/5 stars
Rolling Stone	3.5/5 stars
Spin	4/5 stars
Uncut	5/5 stars

For Emma, Forever Ago received widespread acclaim from critics. It scored an 88 on review aggregate site Metacritic, based on 27 critics. One of the earliest reviews came from Pitchfork's Stephen M. Deusner, who praised Vernon's "soulful performance," describing the record as "a ruminative collection of songs full of natural imagery and acoustic strums—the sound of a man left alone with his memories and a guitar." Rob Sheffield for Rolling Stone christened it a "quiet marvel," praising Vernon's "light touch, with zero interest in narrative or confessional lyrics." The Guardian's Jude Rogers praised Vernon's restraint, noting, "nothing is overplayed, but nothing feels throwaway either." Steven Hyden of The A.V. Club characterized it as "quietly startling," opining, "The power is in how these songs sound rather than what the opaque lyrics don't quite spell out." Tim Sendra of AllMusic wrote that "For Emma captures the sound of broken and quiet isolation, wraps it in a beautiful package, and delivers it to your door with a beating, bruised heart. It's quite an achievement for a debut and the promise of greatness in the future is high."

David Marchese, writing for Spin, suggested Vernon's "sturdy folk chords, earthy melodies, and plainspoken, pastoral lyrics prevent the album from descending into self-pity." Uncut's John Mulvey deemed the record "a hermetically sealed, complete and satisfying album" that "operates so securely and intensely in its own world that to listen sometimes seem like an intrusive act." Darcie Stevens of the Austin Chronicle described the record as a "paradigm of uninhibited closure, a gentle touch on a sad day," writing, "[Vernon]'s pain is so visceral it provides warmth, the therapeutic definition of music." The New York Times called the record "irresistible." On the other hand, Robert Christgau, in his review for MSN Music, stated that the album ultimately had little to say about "shared aloneness", comparing Vernon unfavorably to Robert Creeley and writing that Vernon's "solitary meditations ... lose definition faster than an angel's breath on a January morn".

=== Accolades ===
Year	Rank	Country	Publication	List
2008	4	UK	Mojo	Top 50 Albums of 2008
2008	24	UK	NME	Top 50 Albums of 2008
2008	1	UK	Observer Music Monthly	50 Albums of the Year
2008	4	US	Paste	Signs of Life 2008: Best Music
2008	8	US	Pazz & Jop	Album Winners
2007	29	US	Pitchfork	Top 50 Albums of 2007
2008	34	UK	Q	50 Best Albums of the Year
2008	2	UK	The Skinny	Top Ten Albums of 2008
2008	31	US	Spin	The 40 Best Albums of 2008
2008	1	UK	Rough Trade	Top 50 Albums of 2008
2008	4	UK	Rockfeedback	Top 100 Albums of 2008
2008	4	UK	Uncut	Top 50 Albums of 2008
2008	19	US	Under the Radar	Top 50 Albums of 2008
2009	87	UK	NME	The Top 100 Greatest Albums of the Decade
2009	29	US	Pitchfork	Top 200 Albums of The 2000s
2009	17	US	Rhapsody	100 Best Albums of the Decade
2009	8	US	Rhapsody	Alt/Indie's Best Albums of the Decade
2011	92	US	Rolling Stone	100 Best Albums of the 2000s
2011	92	US	NME	The Top 100 Greatest Albums of the Decade
2020	461	US	Rolling Stone	The 500 Greatest Albums of All Time

== Commercial performance ==
Upon its February 2008 release, For Emma, Forever Ago sold 4,000 copies in its debut week. That placed it on several US album sales charts, including at number 182 on the Billboard 200 and a number five entry on the Top Heatseekers chart. Sales for For Emma were "slow-building," according to music publication Billboard, but eventually became a "commercial smash" for Jagjaguwar. The album eventually peaked at number 64 on the Billboard 200 in the issue dated January 24, 2009. Prior to its official release on Jagjaguwar, the album was widely available online. The label offered sales incentives in response, including a free poster with pre-ordered copies, a bonus track on the iTunes Store edition, as well as purchasing a copy required for in-store performances. The album was mostly successful among triple-A radio stations in the US, including many public stations in the Midwest, where the label focused their marketing campaign.

In the United Kingdom, the album debuted at number 42 on the UK Albums Chart; it was later certified gold by the British Phonographic Industry (BPI) for sales of over 100,000 copies. It achieved its largest international success in Ireland, where it debuted at number 16; it was also a top 40 hit album in Flanders, Portugal, Australia, and Denmark. In Australia, the album was eventually certified platinum by the Australian Recording Industry Association (ARIA), denoting shipments of 70,000 copies, and it was also certified gold by IFPI Denmark, denoting shipments of 10,000 copies.

For Emma, Forever Ago has been a top-selling title on vinyl for many years during the format's revival in the US; it sold over 102,000 copies on vinyl in the first half of the 2010s. "If you'd told me when we put out For Emma, Forever Ago that we would sell almost 100,000 copies on vinyl, I would think that was just absolutely insane," said Nick Blandford, managing director of the Secretly Label Group. Its overall sales were last estimated at 335,000 copies in the United States, according to Nielsen SoundScan, in June 2011, but the album was certified gold by the Recording Industry Association of America (RIAA) in 2013 for shipments of 500,000 copies, and later, platinum in 2017 for combined sales, streaming and track-sales equivalent of 1,000,000 units.

== Touring ==
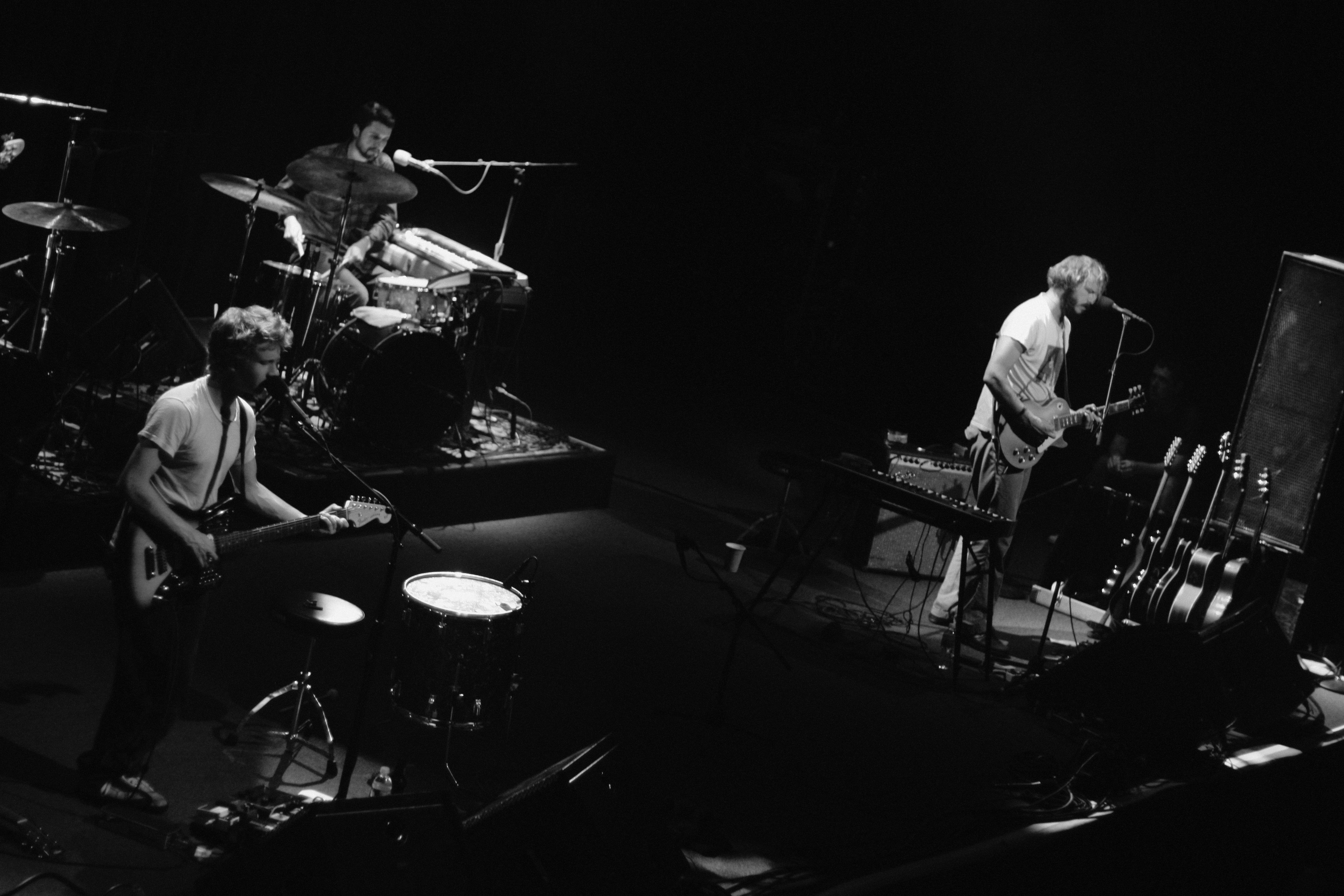
Bon Iver performing at The Fillmore in September 2009.

Vernon first toured as Bon Iver along the East Coast, supporting Elvis Perkins, in late 2007. One of the biggest concerts came in December 2007, when the band performed at the Bowery Ballroom. For the major touring cycle after the album's official release, he gathered together several musicians for the trek, including former guitar student Mike Noyce and drummer Sean Carey. Carey, a jazz drummer from UW–Eau Claire, was a fan of the album, and had approached Vernon at one of his first performances. Vernon felt comfortable performing the album live, though it was very personal: "It's weird that I'm still behind these songs," he told PopMatters. "It's weird that I'm still able to float with them and be with them and find new and old pain in the song. The fact that they haven't just run their course, that they're not old hat after a year is really exciting." The band toured with label-mates Black Mountain, which allowed the two groups to attract a "diverse crowd," according to Billboard. In summer 2009, the band played various festivals, including Bonnaroo, Lollapalooza, and Austin City Limits. Some shows were performed with support from the Indigo Girls, one of Vernon's favorite groups. He held one memorable show at Hollywood Forever Cemetery at six in the morning. The album's main touring cycle was complete by late 2009.

== Track listing ==
=== Original release ===
All tracks are written by Justin Vernon.

For Emma, Forever Ago
No.	Title	Length
1.	"Flume"	3:40
2.	"Lump Sum"	3:20
3.	"Skinny Love"	4:00
4.	"The Wolves (Act I and II)"	5:22
5.	"Blindsided"	5:30
6.	"Creature Fear"	3:06
7.	"Team"	1:56
8.	"For Emma"	3:40
9.	"re: Stacks"	6:40
Total length:		37:14

=== iTunes release ===
Bonus track
No.	Title	Length
10.	"Wisconsin"	5:24
Total length:		42:38

== Personnel ==
Information in this section is adapted from the album's liner notes, with additional info from taken from Tidal.

Bon Iver

- Justin Vernon – vocals, guitar, production, songwriting

Additional musicians

- John Dehaven – trumpet (track 8)
- Randy Pingrey – trombone (track 8)
- Christy Smith – drums, vocals (track 1)

Production

- Justin Vernon — recording
- Nick Petersen – mastering

Design

- Brian Moen – art direction
- Daniel Murphy – layout
- Griszka Niewiadomski – photography
- Gilbert Vernon – photography
- Deb Sorge – hand lettering

== Charts ==
Chart (2008–09)	Peak position
Australian Albums (ARIA)	32
Belgian Albums (Ultratop Flanders)	20
Danish Albums (Hitlisten)	33
Irish Albums (IRMA)	16
Dutch Albums (Album Top 100)	61
Portuguese Albums (AFP)	24
UK Albums (Official Charts)	42
US Billboard 200	64
US Top Alternative Albums (Billboard)	16
US Heatseekers Albums (Billboard)	1
US Independent Albums (Billboard)	4
US Top Rock Albums (Billboard)	20
US Indie Store Album Sales (Billboard)	5

Chart (2011)	Peak position
US Top Catalog Albums (Billboard)	9

== Certifications ==
Region	Certification	Certified units/sales
Australia (ARIA)	Platinum	70,000^{^}
Denmark (IFPI Danmark)	2× Platinum	40,000^{‡}
United Kingdom (BPI)	Platinum	300,000^{‡}
United States (RIAA)	Platinum	1,000,000^{‡}
^{^} Shipments figures based on certification alone.^{‡} Sales+streaming figures based on certification alone.

== Release history ==
Region	Date	Format	Label
United States	July 8, 2007	CD	Self-distribution
United States	February 19, 2008	CD, LP, digital download	Jagjaguwar
Europe	May 12, 2008	CD, LP, digital download	4AD
