= Dopamine (Third Eye Blind album) =

Studio album by Third Eye Blind
- Released: June 16, 2015
- Recorded: 2010–2015
- Genre: Alternative rock; pop rock; arena rock
- Length: 47:18 (original edition); 47:43 (digital edition released in November 2015)
- Label: Mega Collider; Megaforce
- Producer: Stephan Jenkins

Third Eye Blind chronology
Ursa Major (2009)	Dopamine (2015)	We Are Drugs (2016)

Third Eye Blind studio chronology
Ursa Major (2009)	Dopamine (2015)	Screamer (2019)

Singles from Dopamine
- 1. "Everything Is Easy" Released: May 8, 2015; 2. "Get Me Out of Here" Released: August 24, 2015

Dopamine is the fifth studio album by American rock band Third Eye Blind, released on June 16, 2015. It is the band's first studio album since 2009's Ursa Major. Third Eye Blind worked on Dopamine from 2010 to 2015. The album's first single, "Everything Is Easy", was released on May 8, 2015, along with a cover version of the Beyoncé song "Mine". The album debuted at No. 13 on the Billboard 200, selling over 21,000 copies in its first week.

== Background ==
The band spoke of a fifth album as early as 2009, upon releasing their fourth studio album, Ursa Major. Material had been written and recorded sporadically over the course of six years since their third album, Out of the Vein, resulting in such a wealth of material that the band considered releasing it as a double album, Ursa Major being the main album, and Ursa Minor being a fifth album, containing leftover tracks. Plans went from releasing them as a double album, to releasing them as two separate but companion type fourth and fifth albums, to not releasing Minor at all, as by 2012, frontman Stephan Jenkins announced that the entire idea had been scrapped in favor of writing new material. The change in plans had been a result of changes in band members; much of Ursa Major and Ursa Minor had been written with guitarist Tony Fredianelli, who after the release of Ursa Major, sued the band for missing song-writing credits and publishing royalties for Ursa Major and the Red Star EP. Fredianelli had many of the claims dismissed, but ultimately still won over $400,000 from the band for lost wages in touring in support of Ursa Major. He was replaced by Irish guitarist Kryz Reid. The band also recruited new bassist Alex LeCavalier—the position had previously been filled by various session and touring members—and Alex Kopp, a dedicated keyboardist for the first time in the band's history.

== Writing and recording ==
The band started writing and recording new material for the fifth album as early as 2010, initially aiming for an early 2011 release date. The release date eventually slipped into 2012, and then later, by late 2012, Jenkins conceded that he was again suffering from writer's block and was struggling to finish lyrics for songs. He also announced at that time that it would be the band's last album. The only work released from the sessions was the track "If There Ever Was A Time", a track released for free in 2011 in support of the Occupy Wall Street movement happening at the time. In 2012, the band traveled to India to play a four city spanning tour, to "get inspired" for the new album, and to record a music video for a track titled "All the Soul". The video, which was to capture playing the song live on top of a double decker bus in Mumbai traffic, never surfaced, though work on the album did start increasing the following year in 2013, when Jenkins reported he had written 40 to 50 new songs since the band had begun working on new material. Despite this, progress on the album continued to be slow, with the album being delayed from 2013 to 2014 to 2015. The slow pace was attributed to writer's block and the band's extensive touring schedule during the same timeframe. Drummer Brad Hargreaves also noted that their past success had led to many opportunities to take breaks in the music creation process to follow other ventures, and that "if you were to add up all the days we worked on the record, it probably would've taken about a year to make the record."

We don't really have a process. We look at the song we have and go, "Okay, it's ready to go. Let's book the studio." [For] some of them, we'll bring in this session from the demo we did for it, maybe use a couple parts from that, build a song and then overdub a song. Sometimes we get in there with the whole band and just cut it live. We'll cut it live, do overdubs and then we'll chop it up later. I mean, there's no real process. We just kind of gauge [whether we] are conveying the emotion of the song and the lyrics. We try to figure out the best way to arrive at delivering that emotion ... Sometimes Stephan brings in completed songs ... Sometimes he'll just have a verse and a chorus and then we'll get together in a room and write a bridge. Sometimes he'll have a whole song, and then we'll completely rework it.

— Brad Hargreaves, on the creation process with himself and frontman Stephan Jenkins.

One of Jenkins' efforts to overcome his writer's block was to do a "life swap" with a fellow musician who was living in a small dorm-like apartment in a dangerous part of a city, an environment Jenkins had been in while writing the band's self-titled debut album prior to any of the band's fame in the late 1990s. The experience inspired the lyrical content for the track "Back to Zero". The track was completely written lyrically at this time, but completely reworked sonically in the studio later on, in collaboration with Hargreaves. Jenkins was also lyrically inspired by the Beyoncé song "Mine". The band started playing a cover version of the song live at concerts and dress rehearsals in 2014, and in response to positive fan reception, proceeded to record a studio version of the song during the Dopamine sessions. Jenkins put special care into making it sound like a Third Eye Blind song; Hargreaves even believed it to be an original composition of Jenkins upon his first listen to it. The back and forth first verse of the track "Say It" is based on a real conversation Jenkins had with someone else. The track features a spoken word piece in the bridge by K.Flay. The lyrics to that part, written by Jenkins, were meant to represent his own self-doubts regarding the music creation process. Similarly, "Get Me Out of Here" lyrically represented Jenkins' anxiety towards live performance shows, with the composition being made to sound similar to rock operas such as The Rocky Horror Picture Show. The song "Blade" was previously written and performed live under the name "Dream Sequence", as it was inspired by Jenkins' recurring dreams about cutting through the tension of his nightmares. The song specifically describes a dream where Jenkins attempts to stab someone out of jealousy in a dreamlike state, but the other person is unaffected. "Rites of Passage" was inspired by the David Bowie track "Changes", and contains several direct allusions to Bowie's work. After the album's release, Jenkins referred to the album collectively as being about "a search for authenticity and connection in this increasingly isolated and isolating culture."

The band wrapped up their final recording sessions for the album on May 12, 2015, with Jenkins and Reid putting the final touches on the track "Dopamine". The album entered the mixing phase on the same day. Six songs fully recorded in the Dopamine sessions were left unmixed and ultimately not released on the album, with Jenkins planning on releasing them separately upon having time to finish vocals and mixing them after wrapping up touring in support of Dopamine in late 2015.

== Sound and composition ==
In 2012, Jenkins outlined how the music was shaping up at that point:

I think it will have a sort of big, open sound with anthem tracks with an Arcade Fire feeling to it and others with a shoegaze kind of feel. Some tracks will be simple, raw sounding."

Prior to the album's release in May 2015, Hargreaves said:

Most Third Eye Blind albums are fairly eclectic sounding — there's acoustic songs, there's rock sounds, there's electronic stuff. I think we've kept that formula going. Our new album, no one is going to mistake it for being a completely different band, but there's quite a bit of evolution on it. I think you can hear it on the first single, 'Everything Is Easy,' and 'Mine.'

Musically, the album has been described as alternative rock, pop rock, and arena rock.

== Release and promotion ==
In early 2015, the band announced they would be doing an extensive Summer Tour with Dashboard Confessional. Jenkins announced that a single from the fifth album would be released prior to the tour, with an accompanying music video being created in April 2015. On May 8, 2015, the album's official title, Dopamine, and first single, "Everything Is Easy", were publicly announced. "Everything Is Easy" was also made available to stream on the same day. On May 12, the band released a second track from the sessions, the studio version of the Beyoncé "Mine" cover. The song, along with an accompanying music video, was premiered on Tumblr for The Tonight Show Starring Jimmy Fallon, and featured a guest appearance from Pierce the Veil frontman Vic Fuentes.

The album was released on June 16, 2015. The album debuted at No. 13 on the Billboard 200, selling just over 21,000 copies in its first week.

== Reception ==
Professional ratings
Aggregate scores
Source	Rating
Metacritic	61/100
Review scores
Source	Rating
Absolute Punk	8/10 stars
AllMusic	3/5 stars
Associated Press	(Positive)
Rolling Stone	3/5 stars

The album was generally well received by critics. Absolute Punk referred to the album as "the missing link between Blue and Out of the Vein", and praised it for being "a testament to [Jenkins]'s talent as a songwriter, as well as to the skills of the band he's assembled here, that he can still make an album that feels like it could have come out during his peak days... He's still capable of writing catchy songs with deep, unique, and often devastating lyrics. Dopamine isn't his best record, and it might be his worst, but for one of the slyest songwriters from the past two decades of pop, 'worst' can still be pretty damn great." Rolling Stone praised the album for melding the band's classic 1990s alternative rock sound with different influences such as The Cure and Arcade Fire. The Associated Press singled out "All the Souls" as a standout track and concluded that "whichever incarnation of Third Eye Blind you prefer, and for many it's the era of the band's hit 'Semi-Charmed Life', this version is tight and the songwriting is clean and captivating." AllMusic critic Stephen Thomas Erlewine stated that while the departure of long time guitarist Tony Fredianelli "reinforces how Third Eye Blind is very much the Stephan Jenkins show... When the record gets cooking, chorus melodies can soar and riffs can punch, creating an insistent, surging, miniaturized arena rock -- music where the emotions and sound exist on a grand scale but the intent feels intimate."

== Track listing ==
All tracks are written by Stephan Jenkins, except where noted.

No.	Title	Writer(s)	Length
1.	"Everything Is Easy"	Jenkins; Abe Millett	3:29
2.	"Shipboard Cook"		4:42
3.	"All the Souls"		2:47
4.	"Dopamine"		3:39
5.	"Rites of Passage"	Jenkins; Kryz Reid	4:22
6.	"Back to Zero"		3:29^{†}
7.	"Something in You"	Jenkins; Reid; Brad Hargreaves; Alex Kopp	3:21
8.	"Get Me Out of Here"		4:47
9.	"Blade"		3:51
10.	"All These Things"		2:25
11.	"Exiles"	Jenkins; Andrew Dawson	4:04
12.	"Say It" (featuring spoken word by K.Flay; includes coda of "Rites of Passage" as a hidden track)		6:22
Total length:			47:18

^{†} In November 2015, a different version of "Back to Zero", running 3:54, replaced the original version of the song on the digital edition of Dopamine. The only difference between the versions is the addition of a spoken section.

B-sides

- "Mine" (Beyoncé cover)

== Personnel ==
Band

- Stephan Jenkins – lead vocals, rhythm guitar
- Kryz Reid – lead guitar, backing vocals
- Alex LeCavalier – bass guitar
- Alex Kopp – keyboard
- Brad Hargreaves – drums

Additional musicians

- K.Flay – spoken word on "Say It"

Production

- Stephan Jenkins – production
- Martin Teref – production on "All the Souls"
- Ryan Rabin – production on "Rites of Passage"
- Chad Copelin – production on "Back to Zero", "Something in You", and "All These Things"
- Jason Lader – production and sound engineering on "Get Me Out of Here" and "Blade"
- Mark Needham – mixing
- Ryan Hewitt – mixing
- Sean Beresford – sound engineer
- Andrew Dawson – sound engineer
- Doug Boehm – sound engineer

== Charts ==
Chart (2015)	Peak position
UK Independent Albums (OCC)	48
US Billboard 200	13
US Independent Albums (Billboard)	1
US Indie Store Album Sales (Billboard)	18
US Top Album Sales (Billboard)	7
US Top Alternative Albums (Billboard)	3
US Top Rock Albums (Billboard)	3
