= Broncho (band) =

American indie rock band

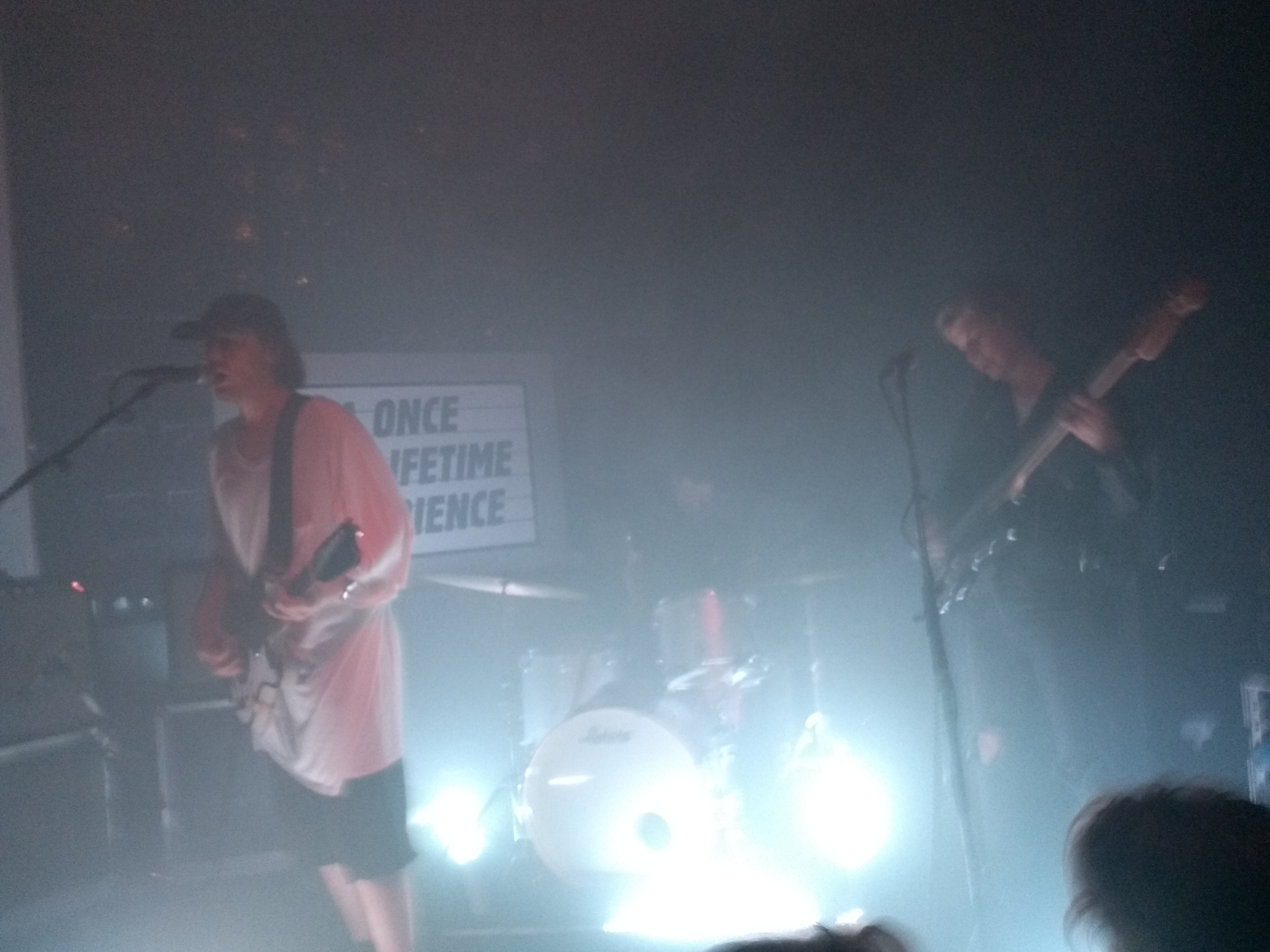
- BRONCHO (2019)

Background information
- Origin: Norman, Oklahoma, United States
- Genres: Indie rock
- Years active: 2010–present
- Labels: Dine Alone, Fairfax
- Members: Ryan Lindsey; Nathan Price; Brennan Smiley; Penny Pitchlynn
- Past members: Jonathan Ford; Mandii Larsen; Ben King
- Website: broncho.tv

Broncho (stylized as BRONCHO) is an American indie rock band formed in 2010 in Norman, Oklahoma. The current lineup consists of Ryan Lindsey on guitar and vocals, Brennan Smiley on guitar, Penny Pitchlynn on bass, and Nathan Price on drums.

== History ==
Broncho's debut album, Can't Get Past the Lips, was originally released in 2011 on Guestroom Records and Austin-based CQ Records, and was later rereleased by Fairfax Recordings in 2013. The band released their second album Just Enough Hip to Be Woman on September 16, 2014, through Dine Alone Records. The album received generally favorable reviews from critics.

Broncho released their third album, Double Vanity, in 2016, followed by Bad Behavior in 2018. Bad Behavior was generally well received by critics, who noted a shift toward a more pop-oriented sound.

Several of the band's songs have been featured in film, television, and advertising. The band's song "It's On" was played over the closing credits of "Females Only," the first episode of the third season of the HBO series Girls. "Try Me Out Sometime" was used in an advertisement for HBO Now and in the film Movie 43, and was also featured in the documentary Valley Uprising. The track "Class Historian" was used in a commercial for Kate Hudson for her Fabletics brand of women's athletic clothing and Cartoon Network's bearstack campaign. It also appears on the soundtrack for Vacation, in the second episode of the second season of Santa Clarita Diet, in the first episode of Reservation Dogs and in the first gameplay trailer of the video-game Ananta. "Boys Got to Go" was featured on the soundtrack of the 2019 soccer video game PES 2020.

== Discography ==
- Can't Get Past the Lips (2011)
- Just Enough Hip to Be Woman (2014)
- Double Vanity (2016)
- Bad Behavior (2018)
- Natural Pleasure (2025)
