= Happy Diving =

US musical group

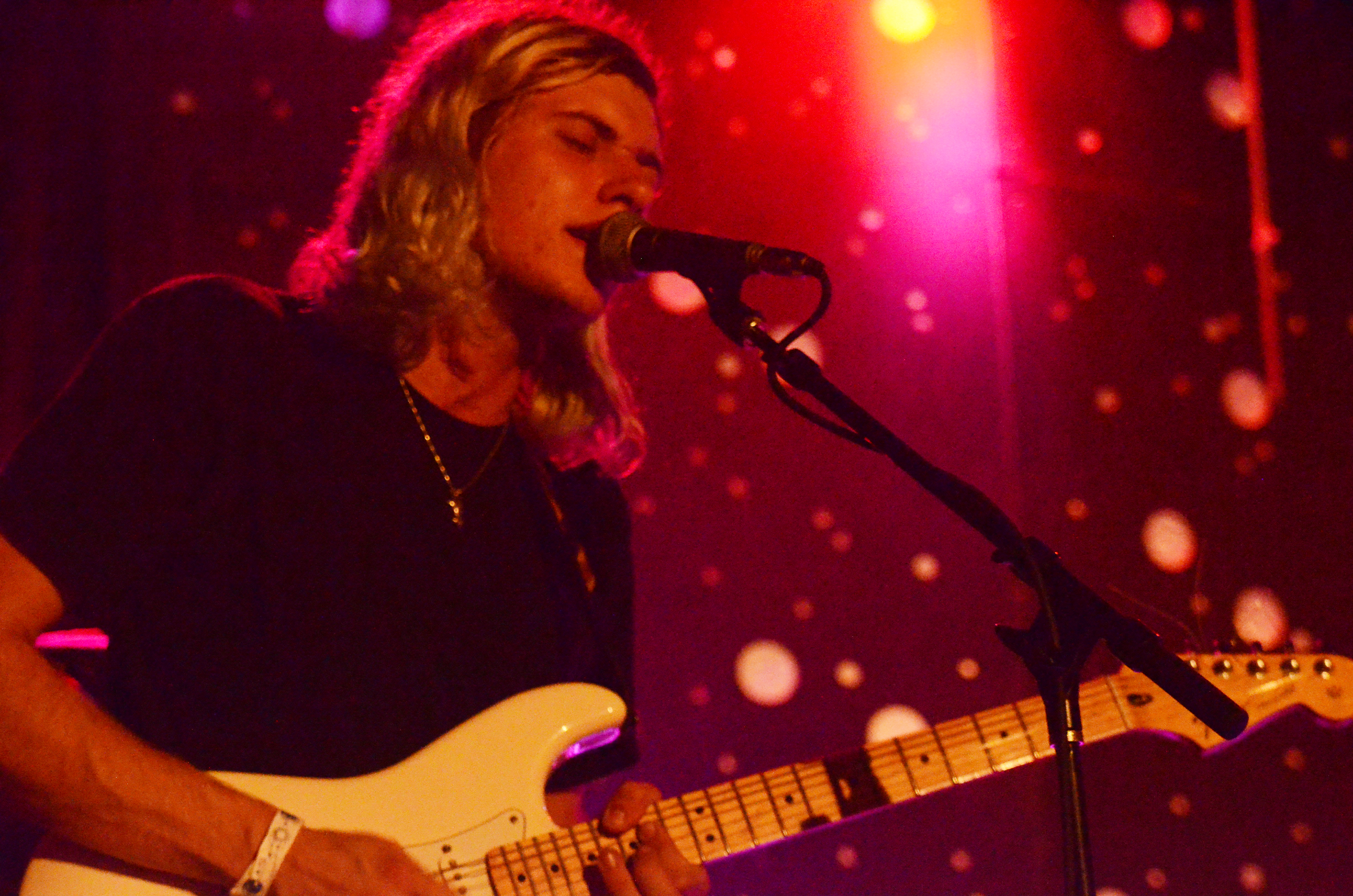
- Happy Diving Live August 5, 2016 at The Pinhook

Background information
- Origin: Oakland, California
- Genre: Indie rock • shoegaze
- Years active: 2013 - 2016 • 2022, 2026-present
- Label: Father/Daughter Records • Topshelf Records
- Members: Matthew Berry; Samuelito Cruz; Mikey Rivera; Matt Yankovich
- Past members: Will Anderson; Kevin Prochnow

Happy Diving was an American indie rock band from Oakland, California.

== History ==
Happy Diving began in 2013 with the release of a self-titled EP on Father/Daughter Records. Happy Diving released their first full-length album titled Big World in 2014 on Father/Daughter Records. In 2015, Happy Diving released an EP titled So Bunted on Topshelf Records. In 2016, Happy Diving released their second full-length album titled Electric Soul Unity via Topshelf Records.

== Style ==
Happy Diving's sound has been described as "noisy, fuzz-laden indie rock" with compositions characterized as "powerful, noisy blasts". The band's influences include Dinosaur Jr. and Weezer. Happy Diving has been compared to Ovlov.

== Band members ==
- Matt Berry - vocals, guitar - (2013-2016, 2022, 2026-present)
- Samuelito Cruz - drums - (2013-2016, 2022, 2026-present)
- Mikey Rivera - bass - (2013-2016, 2022, 2026-present)
- Matt Yankovich - guitar (2013-2016, 2026-present)

Past Members

- Kevin Prochnow - guitar (2015-2016, 2022)
- Will Anderson - guitar (2016)

Touring Fill In Members

- Sam Kless - guitar (2015)
- Ben Donlon - drums (2015)

== Discography ==
Studio albums

- Big World (2014, Father/Daughter)
- Electric Soul Unity (2016, Topshelf)

EPs

- Happy Diving (2014, Father/Daughter)
- So Bunted (2015, Topshelf)
