= Spring Valley High School (South Carolina) =

Location
- 120 Sparkleberry Lane; Columbia, South Carolina 29229; United States; 34°6′40″N 80°52′58″W

Information
- Type: Public secondary
- Established: 1970 (56 years ago)
- School district: Richland County School District Two
- Principal: Jeff Temoney
- Teaching staff: 123.20 (FTE)
- Grades: 9–12
- Enrollment: 2,314 (2023–2024)
- Student to teacher ratio: 18.78
- Campus type: Suburban
- Colors: Green and gold
- Nickname: Vikings
- Rivals: Dutch Fork High School; Richland Northeast High School
- Accreditation: South Carolina Department of Education and Southern Association of Colleges and Schools
- Yearbook: Saga
- Website: www.svh.richland2.org

Spring Valley High School is located in unincorporated Northeast Columbia, South Carolina, United States, and is operated by Richland County School District Two. Opened in the fall of 1970, it was for a long time the sole high school operating in Richland School District Two, replacing Dentsville High School.

== History ==
The school was established in 1970. The school had an unusual design. The main building was divided into octagonal 'pods', each containing eight chevron-shaped classrooms. This design was borne out of the open classroom concept that was popular during the late 1960s and early 1970s. In the school's early days, classrooms within each pod had no walls, allowing students to participate in any one of several classes occurring at one time. This did not prove successful, and walls were later added to separate the classroom pods by the early 1980s.

In 2008, a new three story building replaced the pods as the new school building, integrating the original gymnasium and fine arts buildings as the only remaining pieces of the original campus.

In the 2023 to 2024 school year, the school had an enrollment of 2,314.

=== Disturbance arrests in 2015 ===
On October 26, 2015, a Richland County sheriff's deputy who was serving as Spring Valley's school resource officer was called to a classroom to remove a student from her classroom. When the student then refused to give up her cell phone and leave the room, she was arrested on a charge called "disturbing schools." During the arrest, she was pulled from her desk by the officer, thrown to the floor and handcuffed. Another female student was also charged with disturbing schools after she allegedly yelled and cursed at the officer.

Later that month, the officer was fired after an internal review found that his actions ran counter to sheriff's department policy. The FBI and the US Department of Justice in 2015 were investigating to determine if the deputy violated the student's civil rights. In response to the incident, South Carolina lawmakers, led by Rep. Mia McLeod, in 2016 proposed limitations to the state statute that defines when students can be arrested for disrupting schools. School district administrators also promised to conduct additional staff training about when to involve school resource officers in future incidents.

However, the school resource officer garnered massive amounts of support from coworkers and students of Spring Valley. There was enormous outrage by the student body over the issue being turned into a racial issue, and the students actually organized a peaceful walkout in support of the resource officer.

== Magnet programs ==
The Discovery magnet program, founded in 1995, is designed for talented students and focuses on science and math. These courses are honors level and required for all members of the Discovery program. All discovery members are required to complete two college-level research projects during their sophomore and junior year. The completion of at least four AP courses (one math, one science, two others) is required for graduation from the Discovery program.

The Explorations program is the sister program to Discovery. It also focuses on math and science, but is a college-preparatory program, as opposed to an honors program.

== State championships ==
- Boys soccer: 2007
- Football: 1973, 1974, 1975, 1988
- Men's Track & Field: 1978, 1988, 1989, 1991, 2003, 2013, 2022, 2023
- Girls Basketball: 1978, 2009, 2011, 2015, 2016, 2018
- Men’s Cross Country: 2003
- Girls Cross Country: 1985, 1987, 1988, 1989, 1990, 1991
- Girls Track: 1986, 1987, 1988, 1989, 1990, 1991, 1992, 1993, 1994, 2005
- Girls Tennis: 1988, 1989
- Boys Tennis: 1973, 1974, 1982, 2010
- Boys Golf: 1972, 1979, 1981, 1988, 1989, 1990
- Softball: 1991, 1993, 1994

== Notable alumni ==
- Michael Boulware — NFL defensive back
- Peter Boulware — NFL linebacker
- Jordan Bruner — professional basketball player
- PJ Dozier — NBA guard for Sacramento Kings
- Ainsley Earhardt — Fox News Channel anchor
- Lethon Flowers — NFL defensive back
- Taylor Guerrieri — MLB baseball player
- Terrance Hayes — poet and professor
- Monique Hennagan — Olympic runner
- Scott Holroyd — actor
- Danielle Howle — songwriter
- Dinah Johnson — author and professor
- Tyrone Legette — NFL defensive back
- Christian Miller — NFL linebacker
- Jocelyn Newman — judge
- Andre Roberts — NFL wide receiver for Carolina Panthers
- Scott Sartiano — restaurateur and club owner
- Channing Tindall — inside linebacker
- Travis Williams - NFL linebacker and College Football Coach and coordinator
- Willie Williams — NFL defensive back
- Ed Young — lead pastor of Fellowship Church

== See also ==
- List of high schools in South Carolina
- "Cop vs. Phone Girl" (song by Third Eye Blind)
- School disturbance laws
