= Ursa Major (Third Eye Blind album) =

Studio album by Third Eye Blind
- Released: August 18, 2009
- Recorded: 2005–2009
- Genre: Alternative rock; pop rock
- Length: 47:06
- Label: Mega Collider; Megaforce
- Producer: Stephan Jenkins

Third Eye Blind chronology
Red Star (2008)	Ursa Major (2009)	Dopamine (2015)

Third Eye Blind studio chronology
Out of the Vein (2003)	Ursa Major (2009)	Dopamine (2015)

Singles from Ursa Major
- 1. "Don't Believe a Word" Released: June 18, 2009

Ursa Major is the fourth studio album by American rock band Third Eye Blind. Released on August 18, 2009, on the group's own Mega Collider label, Ursa Major was the group's first studio album in over six years. The first single from the album was "Don't Believe a Word", which debuted on the radio June 5, 2009.

== Background ==
Frontman Stephan Jenkins had intended for the album to be released in 2007 but did not feel that it was complete, and writer's block slowed down the album's progress. In an interview with Rolling Stone, Jenkins also noted that the recording industry had "just collapsed" following the release of Out of the Vein.

The working title of the album was The Hideous Strength, after a similarly named C.S. Lewis book. According to Jenkins, the album's name was subsequently changed to Ursa Major because "...We’ve been hibernating and now we’ve awakened and we are hungry for spring and we want to feed and we want to thrive." Another album, Ursa Minor (B-Sides compilation), was scheduled to follow Ursa Major, but the idea was later scrapped in favor of a new studio album.

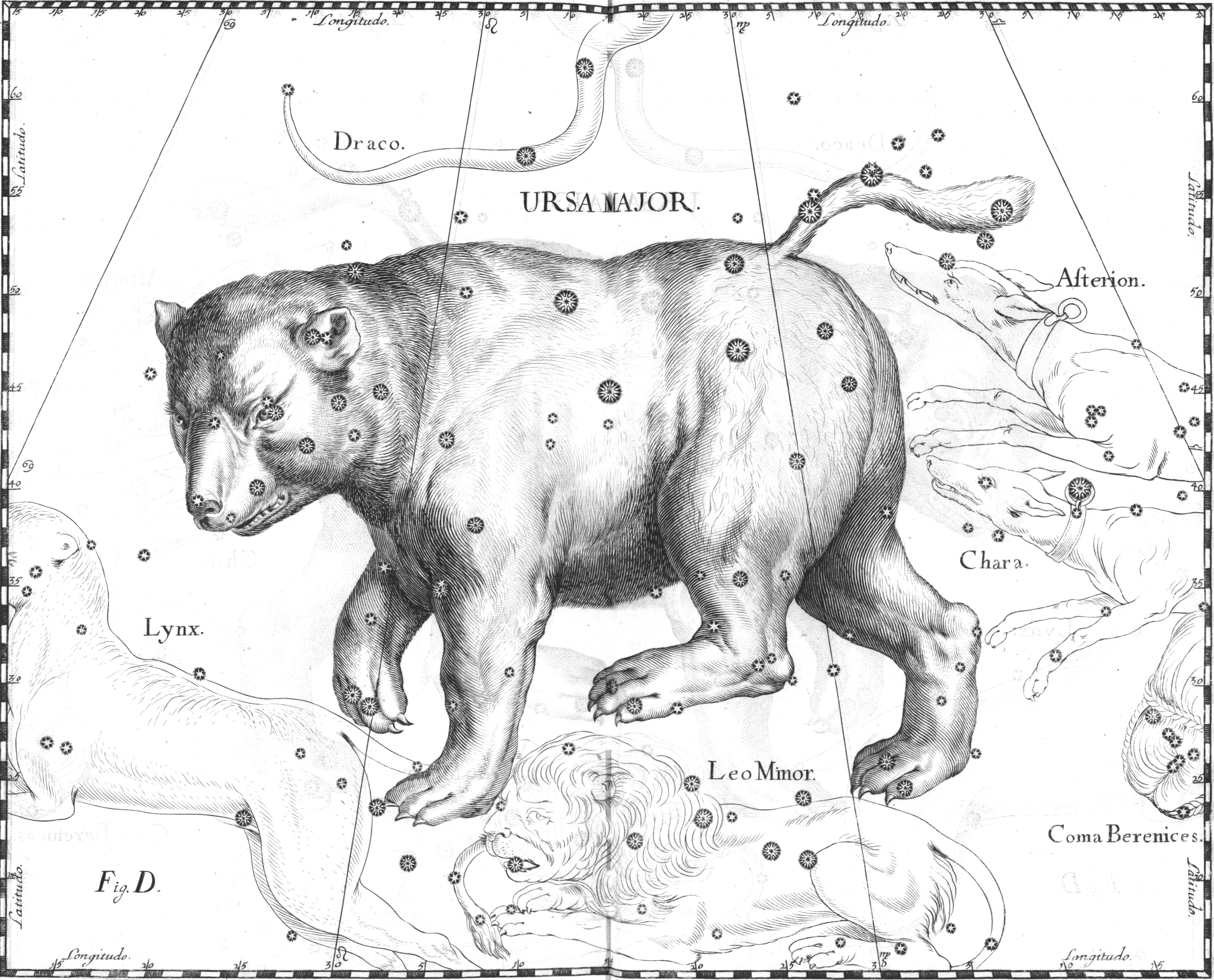
Hevelius' Uranographia.

Ursa Major's cover is derived from Uranographia, a 17th-century drawing by Johannes Hevelius. The view is mirrored following the tradition of celestial globes, showing the celestial sphere in a view from "outside", with the drawing mirrored to match the view through a telescope.

== Reception ==
Professional ratings
Aggregate scores
Source	Rating
Metacritic	65/100
Review scores
Source	Rating
AbsolutePunk	87%
AllMusic	3.5/5 stars
Associated Press	(favorable)
Billboard	(favorable)
Robert Christgau	(1-star Honorable Mention)
Consequence of Sound	3.5/5 stars
Entertainment Weekly	C+
Kerrang!	3/5 stars
Rolling Stone	3/5 stars
Slant Magazine	3/5 stars

Upon its release, Ursa Major received positive reviews from music critics. The review aggregator website Metacritic assigns a "Metascore" to each album, which is based on the ratings and reviews of selected mainstream independent publications, and the release has a score of a 65 based on 7 selected critics, indicating "generally favorable reviews".

== Commercial performance ==
Ursa Major debuted at #3 on the Billboard 200, selling 49,000 copies in its first week of release. The top 10 debut made Ursa Major the highest-charting album of the group's career, though its first week sales were less than that of its predecessor's first week sales of 63,000. The sales would prove to be short lived, as Ursa Major fell to #45 in its second week on the Billboard 200 with a 77% sales drop.

== Track listing ==
All tracks are written by Stephan Jenkins, except where noted.

No.	Title	Writer(s)	Length
1.	"Can You Take Me"	Jenkins, Tony Fredianelli	3:21
2.	"Don't Believe a Word"	Jenkins, Fredianelli	4:01
3.	"Bonfire"	Jenkins, Fredianelli	4:08
4.	"Sharp Knife"	Jenkins, Fredianelli	4:27
5.	"One in Ten"		2:51
6.	"About to Break"	Jenkins, Ari Ingber	3:56
7.	"Summer Town"		4:52
8.	"Why Can't You Be"		5:25
9.	"Water Landing"		4:30
10.	"Dao of St. Paul"		4:05
11.	"Monotov's Private Opera"		4:19
12.	"Carnival Barker" (instrumental)	Jenkins, Fredianelli	1:24
Total length:			47:06

Songs available only by download
No.	Title	Length
13.	"Why Can't You Be" (with Kimya Dawson; iTunes only)	5:27
14.	"Monotov's Private Opera" (acoustic; iTunes pre-order only)	4:20

=== Vinyl version ===
Side A
No.	Title	Length
1.	"Can You Take Me"	3:21
2.	"Don't Believe a Word"	4:01
3.	"Bonfire"	4:08
4.	"Sharp Knife"	4:27
5.	"One in Ten"	2:51
6.	"About to Break"	3:56

Side B
No.	Title	Length
1.	"Summer Town"	4:52
2.	"Why Can't You Be"	5:25
3.	"Water Landing"	4:30
4.	"Dao of St. Paul"	4:05
5.	"Carnival Barker" (instrumental)	1:24
6.	"Monotov's Private Opera"	4:19

Notes

- "Monotov's Private Opera" is not listed on the back of the LP version and is the final song on the LP.

== Personnel ==
Third Eye Blind

- Stephan Jenkins – lead vocals, rhythm guitar, keyboards, percussion, drums ("Why Can't You Be")
- Tony Fredianelli – lead guitar, backing vocals, keyboards
- Brad Hargreaves – drums, percussion, piano

Additional Personnel

- Jon Evans – bass (except "Bonfire")
- Herve Salters – keyboards ("Why Can't You Be")
- Arion Salazar – bass ("Bonfire")
- Robyn Croomer – backing vocals
- Cynthia Taylor – backing vocals
- Minna Choi – backing vocals
- Ben Stokes – drum programming ("Water Landing"), synthesizer ("Can You Take Me")

Production

- Sean Beresford – engineering
- Tony Hoffer – engineering
- Chris Lord-Alge – engineering
- Vlado Meller – mastering

== Charts ==
Chart (2009)	Peak position
US Billboard 200	3
US Independent Albums (Billboard)	1
US Indie Store Album Sales (Billboard)	3
US Top Alternative Albums (Billboard)	1
US Top Rock Albums (Billboard)	1
