= Chad Copelin =

American musician

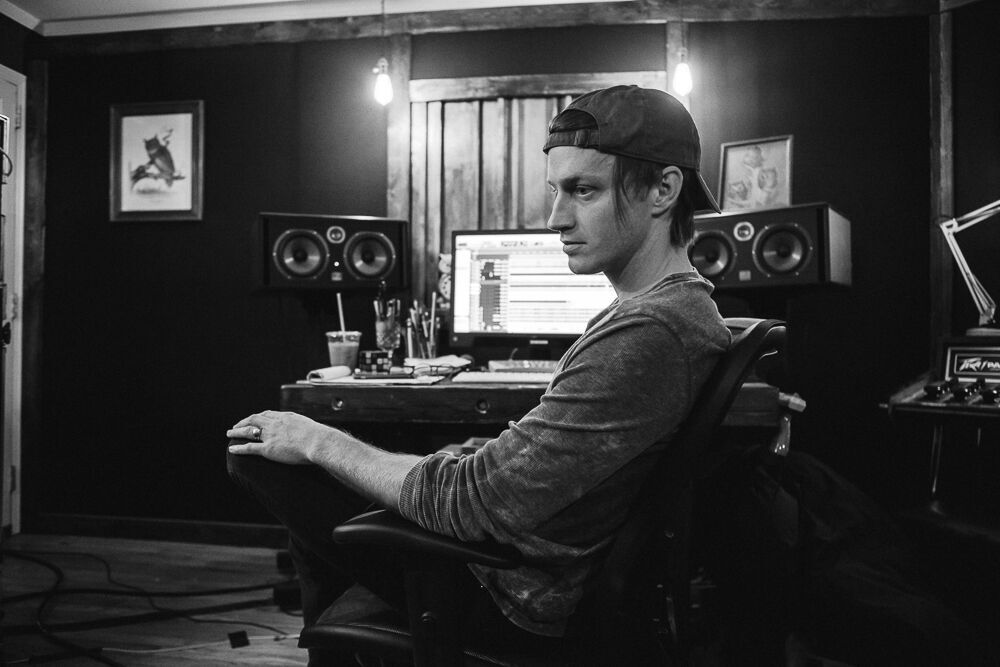
- Chad Copelin in the studio

Background information
- Origin: Oklahoma City, Oklahoma
- Genres: Pop; alternative rock; indie rock
- Occupations: Music producer; engineer; songwriter
- Website: chadcopelin.com

Chad Copelin is an American producer, audio engineer, musician, and songwriter from Norman, Oklahoma. Copelin got his start playing in local bands and majoring in music composition and after three years of school, left to collaborate with various musicians, tour nationally, and engineer and produce local bands. In 2005, he opened Blackwatch Studios with co-owner Jarod Evans and produced his first full-length album, I Am Haunted, I Am Alive by Beau Jenning's project Cheyenne. Copelin was nominated at the 2017 Grammy Awards for Best Contemporary Christian Album for his work on "Poets & Saints" by All Sons & Daughters.

Copelin began to garner attention from a diverse mix of musicians and has since gone on to engineer music for pop artists Christina Perri, Avril Lavigne, Train, Kelly Clarkson, and Third Eye Blind, as well as produce and engineer indie artists such as Sufjan Stevens, Ben Rector, Ivan & Alyosha, Bronze Radio Return, Emily Hearn, BRONCHO, and Other Lives, among others. In 2011 Copelin worked on Christina Perri's Top 40 song "A Thousand Years" that went on to receive six platinum records. Copelin's most recent projects include engineering Sufjan Steven's album, Carrie and Lowell, along with recording and producing Broncho's Just Enough Hip to Be a Woman and Ivan & Alyosha's It's All Just Pretend. Copelin has also been working on new projects with Broncho, Riah, Ben Rector, Bronze Radio Return, Sports and Andrew Belle.

== Discography ==
Year	Artist	Album	Label	Role
2023	Colony House	The Cannonballers	Roon Records	Producer, Writer
2022	Sasha Sloan	I Blame The World	RCA Records	Producer
2022	Beau Jennings & the Tigers	I've Got Your Heart Right Here	Black Mesa	Producer
2022	Amy Stroup	A New Life	Independent	Producer
2022	little image	LUNGS BURN	Hollywood Records	Producer
2022	Bailey Baum	Lonely Looking	Independent	Producer, Writer
2022	Sasha Sloan	WTF	RCA Records	Guitarist
2022	Jake Scott	Texas Girl	Elektra Records	Guitarist
2022	Ben Rector	Thank You	OK KID Recordings	Hammond Organ
2022	TAYA	For All My Life	Invorto, Capitol CMG	Mixer
2021	Jaco Terio	Isadora	Independent	Producer, Mixer
2021	Bronze Radio Return	Right There Beside You	Independent	Producer, Engineer
2021	Sports	Get A Good Look Pt. 1 EP	Naked Records	Producer
2021	LANY	Mama’s Boy (Deluxe)	Polydor Records	Producer
2021	Upstate	Wake Me In The Morning	Position Music	Artist, Producer, Writer, Mixer
2021	Wilderado	Take Some Time (Gus alt-J Remix)	Bright Antenna Records	Writer
2021	Greyson Chance	Holy Feeling	Arista Records	Producer, Writer
2021	Sports	The Look	Naked Records	Producer
2020	Sasha Sloan	Only Child	RCA Records	Co-Producer
2020	Sports	Baby Baby	Independent	Producer
2020	Andrew Belle	Whatever Happened To Christmas	Independent	Mixer
2020	BRONCHO	Family Values (of Montreal Remix)	Park The Van	Producer, Writer
2020	Bailey Baum	Take Me All The Way	Ultra Records	Producer, Writer
2020	LANY	Mama's boy	UMG, Polydor Records	Producer
2020	Ben Rector, Ingrid Michaelson	It Would Be You (Acoustic)	OK Kid Recordings	Producer
2020	Kampweek	Peaches	Blackwatch Records	Producer, Writer
2020	ROOMATE	ROOMATE	Blackwatch Records	Producer
2020	Wilderado	Revenant	Bright Antenna Records	Producer
2020	Bronze Radio Return	Tell It To Me	Independent	Producer
2020	Chair Model	IV	Blackwatch Records	Producer
2020	Norman	III	Blackwatch Records	Producer, Engineer, Composer, Artist
2020	Layup	Layup VII	Blackwatch Records	Producer, Engineer, Composer, Artist
2019	Christina Perri	A Thousand Years (Lullaby)	Elektra Records	Engineer
2019	SYML	SYML	Nettwerk Music Group	Producer, Engineer, Composer
2019	King Rose	King Rose	Blackwatch Records	Producer, Engineer, Composer
2018	Emily Hearn	Christmas, Vol. 1	Old Prince Records	Producer, Engineer
2018	Norman	Norman II	Blackwatch Records	Producer, Engineer, Composer, Artist
2018	Layup	Layup IV	Blackwatch Records	Producer, Engineer, Composer, Artist
2018	Chair Model	II	Blackwatch Records	Producer, Engineer
2018	Mosaic MSC	Heaven EP	Provident Label Group	Producer, Engineer
2018	BRONCHO	Bad Behavior	Park The Van Records	Writer, Musician, Producer, Engineer
2018	Sports	Everyone's Invited	Independent	Musician, Producer, Engineer, Mixer
2018	Ben Rector	Magic	OK Kid Recordings	Additional Production
2018	Chair Model	Chair Model EP	Blackwatch Records	Producer, Engineer
2018	Layup	Whole New Level EP	Blackwatch Records	Producer, Engineer, Composer, Artist
2018	Riah	"Prom"	Independent	Producer, Engineer, Composer
2018	Norman	Norman EP	Blackwatch Records	Artist, Producer, Engineer, Composer
2018	Layup	Natural Rattle	Blackwatch Records	Producer, Engineer, Composer, Artist
2018	SYML	"Wildfire"	Nettwerk Records	Composer
2017	Mustang Island (Pepper Island Films)	Mustang Island		Guitar/Keys
2017	Sufjan Stevens	"Mystery Of Love"	Independent	Engineer
2017	Sufjan Stevens	"Fourth of July - 900X Remix"	Asthmatic Kitty	Keyboards
2017	Sufjan Stevens	"Wallowa Lake Monster"	Asthmatic Kitty	Engineer
2017	Mosaic MSC	Unknown	Provident	Producer, Engineer
2017	EDGES	"EDGES"	Position Music	Artist, Producer, Engineer, Mixer, Composer
2017	Emily Hearn	Paris, Or Wherever We Are	Independent	Producer, Engineer, Mixer
2017	Breakup	Feels Good	Independent	Producer, Engineer, Mixer, Composer
2017	Breakup	Waiting On You	Independent	Producer, Engineer, Mixer, Composer
2017	Nichole Nordeman	Every Mile Mattered	Sparrow Records	Keyboards
2017	Andrew Belle	Dive Deep	Ready Set Records	Producer, Engineer, Composer
2017	Wild Pony	Encinitas	Independent	Producer, Engineer
2017	BRONCHO	Get In My Car	Dine Alone Records	Producer, Engineer, Composer
2017	Sports	Crime	Independent	Producer, Engineer, Composer
2017	Sufjan Stevens, Bryce Dessner, Nico Muhly, & James McAlister	Planetarium	4AD	Engineer
2017	Wilderado	Millie	Ignition Records	Engineer
2017	Andrew Belle	Down	Independent	Producer, Engineer
2017	Upstate	Love Run Free	Position Music	Artist, Producer, Engineer, Composer
2017	Marie Miller	Letterbox	Curb Records	Producer, Engineer
2017	Andrew Belle	Dive Deep	Independent	Producer, Engineer, Composer
2016	Riah	Wildlife	Independent	Producer, Engineer, Composer
2016	Riah	Nightmare	Independent	Producer, Engineer, Composer
2016	Riah	Nice	Independent	Producer, Engineer, Composer
2016	Layup	Layup EP	Independent	Artist, Producer, Engineer, Composer
2016	Graham Colton	Life's What You Make It	Independent	Producer, Engineer, Composer
2016	Graham Colton	Ring Around Your Heart	Independent	Producer, Engineer, Composer
2016	Graham Colton	Where You Wanna Go	Independent	Producer, Engineer, Composer
2016	Barcelona	Basic Man	NBD Music	Producer, Engineer
2016	Third Eye Blind	We are Drugs	Mega Collider Records	Producer
2016	All Sons & Daughters	Poets & Saints	Integrity Music	Producer, Engineer, Keys, Bass
2016	BRONCHO	Double Vanity	Dine Alone Records	Producer, Engineer
2016	Kris Allen	Letting You In	Good Time Inc.	Additional Production
2015	Jonny Diaz	Everything is Changing	Centricity	Producer, Engineer
2015	Bronze Radio Return	Light Me Up	Independent	Producer
2015	The Weather	Waters Electric	Independent	Producer, Engineer
2015	Sports	Naked All The Time	Independent	Producer, Engineer
2015	Amy Lee	Baby Did a Bad, Bad Thing	Independent	Performer
2015	Bronze Radio Return	Light Me Up	Independent	Producer
2015	5 Seconds of Summer	Jet Black Heart	Capitol	Engineer
2015	Ben Rector	Favorite Song	Aptly Named	Co-Producer
2015	Third Eye Blind	Dopamine	Mega Collider	Producer
2015	Sufjan Stevens	Carrie & Lowell	Asthmatic Kitty	Engineer
2015	Ivan & Alyosha	It's All Just Pretend	Dualtone	Producer, Engineer, Mixer, Farifsa, Organ, Piano
2015	Emily Hearn	Hourglass	Independent	Producer, Engineer, Mixer, Keyboards
2014	BRONCHO	Just Enough Hip To Be Woman	Independent	Producer, Engineer, Mixer, Musician
2014	Graham Colton	Lonely Ones	Independent	Co-Producer, Engineer, Composer, Keys, Bass
2014	Emerson Hart	Beauty in Disrepair	Sony	Engineer, Organ
2014	Crowder	Neon Steeple	Sparrow Records	Keys
2014	Eric Hutchinson	Pure Fiction	Warner	Engineer, Bass
2013	Ivan & Alyosha	All The Times We Had	Dualtone	Producer, engineer, Bass, Keys
2013	Ben Rector	The Walking in Between	Independent	Producer, Engineer, Organ
2013	David Hodges	December Sessions Vol. II	Independent	Engineer, Mixer, Organ, Bass
2013	Bronze Radio Return	Up, On & Over	Independent	Producer, Engineer, Keyboards, Percussion
2013	Hanson	Anthem	3CG	Bass
2013	Avril Lavigne	Avril Lavigne	Columbia/Epic)	Engineer, Programmer, Bass
2013	Andrew Belle	Black Bear	Independent	Producer, Engineer, Composer
2013	Brian Haas/Matt Chamberlain	Frames	The Royal Potato	Mixer
2013	Gungor	I Am Mountain	Hither & Yon	Mixer
2012	Train	California 37	Columbia	Engineer
2012	Christina Perri	A Very Merry Perri Christmas	Atlantic	Engineer, Organ
2012	Green River Ordinance	Under Fire	Good Time Records	Producer, Engineer, Composer, Programmer, Keys, Percussion
2011	Christina Perri	The Twilight Saga: Breaking Dawn, Pt. 1 & 2 (Original Motion Picture Soundtrack)	Atlantic/Chop Shop	Engineer, Bass
2011	BRONCHO	Can't Get Past The Lips	Fairfax	Engineer
2011	Gungor	Ghosts Upon Earth	Hither & Yon	Engineer
2011	Jacob Fred Jazz Odyssey	Race Riot Suite	Kinnara Productions	Engineer, Mixer
2011	Ben Rector	Something Like This	Independent	Producer, Engineer, Programmer, Keys, Percussion, Vibraphone
2010	Ben Rector	Into the Morning	Independent	Producer, Engineer, Programmer, Keys, Percussion
2008	Amy Lee (Evanescence)	Nightmare Before Christmas	Avex Trax	Engineer, Keys
2007	Graham Colton	Here Right Now	Independent	Keyboards, Guest Artist
