= Best Coast discography =

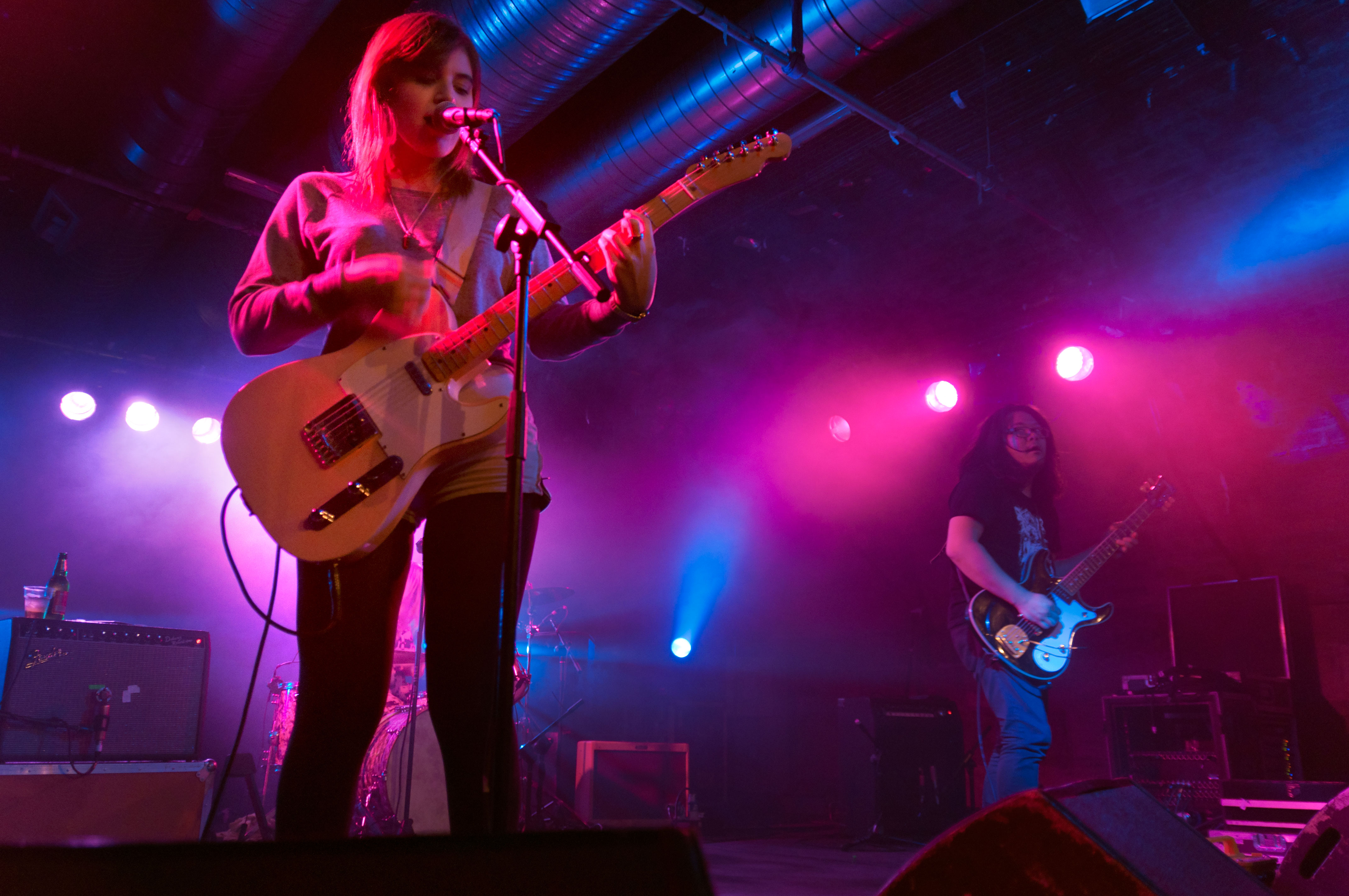
- Best Coast performing in Glasgow in 2011
- Studio albums: 4
- EPs: 7
- Live albums: 2
- Singles: 24
- Music videos: 15

American rock duo Best Coast has released four studio albums, two live albums, seven extended plays, 24 singles, and 15 music videos. Formed in Los Angeles in 2009, the band consists of singer, songwriter, and guitarist Bethany Cosentino and multi-instrumentalist Bobb Bruno.

== Albums ==
=== Studio albums ===
List of studio albums, with selected chart positions
Title	Details	Peak chart positions									Sales
Title	Details	US	US Alt	US Ind	US Rock	AUS	IRE	SCO	UK	UK Ind	Sales
Crazy for You	Released: July 27, 2010; Label: Mexican Summer; Formats: CD, LP, digital download	36	7	5	10	—	—	96	67	—	
The Only Place	Released: May 15, 2012; Label: Mexican Summer; Formats: CD, LP, digital download	24	6	5	10	65	86	58	55	7	US: 54,000
California Nights	Released: May 5, 2015; Label: Harvest; Formats: CD, LP, digital download	53	4	3	5	43	—	88	108	—	
Always Tomorrow	Released: February 21, 2020; Label: Concord; Formats: CD, LP, digital download, streaming	— (Note: Always Tomorrow did not enter the US Billboard 200, but peaked at number 37 on the US Top Album Sales chart.)	—	—	—	—	—	—	—	—	
"—" denotes a recording that did not chart or was not released in that territory.

=== Live albums ===
Title	Details
Live at East West Studios 2011	Released: 2011; Label: Mexican Summer; Format: LP
Daytrotter Studio 4/4/2011	Released: April 4, 2011; Label: Daytrotter; Format: Digital download

== Extended plays ==
List of extended plays, with selected chart positions
Title	Details	Peak chart positions				
Title	Details	US	US Ind	US Rock	AUS Hit.	UK Indie Break.
Where the Boys Are	Released: 2009; Label: Blackest Rainbow; Formats: CD, cassette	—	—	—	—	—
Make You Mine	Released: 2009; Label: Group Tightener; Formats: 7-inch vinyl, digital download	—	—	—	—	—
Something in the Way	Released: February 9, 2010; Label: Post Present Medium; Formats: 7-inch vinyl, digital download	—	—	—	—	—
Summer Is Forever (with Wavves and No Joy)	Released: January 11, 2011; Label: Mexican Summer, Fat Possum; Formats: 7-inch vinyl, digital download	—	—	—	—	—
iTunes Session	Released: May 31, 2011; Label: Mexican Summer; Format: Digital download	—	—	—	—	—
Fade Away	Released: October 22, 2013; Label: Jewel City; Formats: CD, LP, digital download	122	23	40	8	18
Live at World Cafe	Released: September 11, 2020; Label: Concord; Formats: LP, digital download, streaming	—	—	—	—	—
"—" denotes a recording that did not chart or was not released in that territory.

== Singles ==
Title	Year	Peak chart positions			Album
Title	Year	US AAA	MEX Air.	UK Sales	Album
"Sun Was High (So Was I)"	2009	—	—	—	Non-album singles
"Far Away"	2010	—	—	—	Non-album singles
"Boyfriend"	2010	—	28	—	Crazy for You
"All Summer" (with Kid Cudi and Rostam Batmanglij)	2010	—	—	—	Non-album single
"Crazy for You"	2010	—	—	—	Crazy for You
"Got Something for You" (with Wavves)	2010	—	32	—	The Christmas Gig
"Our Deal"	2011	—	—	—	Crazy for You
"When I'm with You"	2011	—	38	—	Crazy for You
"Gone Again"	2011	—	—	—	Non-album single
"The Only Place"	2012	—	46	—	The Only Place
"Storms"	2012	—	—	—	Non-album single
"Do You Love Me Like You Used To"	2012	—	—	—	The Only Place
"Fear of My Identity"	2013	—	—	52	Fade Away
"This Lonely Morning"	2013	—	—	—	Fade Away
"I Don't Know How"	2013	—	—	—	Fade Away
"California Nights"	2015	—	—	—	California Nights
"Heaven Sent"	2015	—	34	—	California Nights
"Feeling Ok"	2015	—	—	—	California Nights
"Late 20s / Bigger Man"	2016	—	—	88	Non-album single
"For the First Time"	2019	—	—	—	Always Tomorrow
"Little Saint Nick"	2019	—	—	—	Non-album single
"Everything Has Changed"	2020	18	—	—	Always Tomorrow
"Leading"	2021	—	—	—	Always Tomorrow
"—" denotes a recording that did not chart or was not released in that territory.

=== Split singles ===
Title	Year
"Tough Guys"/"Up All Night" (with Jeans Wilder)	2010
"Sunny Adventure"/"Bummer" (with JEFF the Brotherhood)	2011

== Guest appearances ==
List of non-single guest appearances, with other performing artists, showing year released and album name
Title	Year	Other artist(s)	Album
"Nodding Off"	2011	Wavves	Life Sux
"Rhiannon"	2012	None	Just Tell Me That You Want Me: A Tribute to Fleetwood Mac
"Go Away"	2014	Weezer	Everything Will Be Alright in the End
"Scooby-Doo Theme Song"	2020	None	Scoob! The Album

== Music videos ==
List of music videos, showing year released and directors
Title	Year	Director(s)
"When I'm with You"	2010	Pete Ohs
"All Summer" (with Kid Cudi and Rostam Batmanglij)	2010	Psyop
"Boyfriend"	2010	Taylor Cohen
"Crazy for You"	2011	Bob Harlow
"Gone Again"	2011	Daniel Garcia
"Our Deal"	2011	Drew Barrymore
"The Only Place"	2012	Ace Norton
"Do You Love Me Like You Used To"	2012	Mariana Blanco
"I Don't Know How"	2013	Patrick O'Dell
"This Lonely Morning"	2013	Danny Jelinek
"California Nights"	2015	Adam Harding
"Heaven Sent"	2015	Lana Kim and Bethany Cosentino
"Feeling Ok"	2015	Mathy & Fran
"In My Eyes"	2015	Johnny Chew
"Everything Has Changed"	2020	Ryan Baxley
