= Boyfriend (disambiguation) =

A boyfriend is a male friend or romantic partner.

Boyfriend(s) or Boy Friend(s) may also refer to:

== Film, television and theatre ==
- The Boy Friend (1926 film), an American romantic comedy
- The Boy Friends, a 1930–1932 series of American comedy short films
- Boy Friend (1939 film), a 1939 American comedy film
- The Boy Friend (musical), a 1954 stage musical
  - The Boy Friend (1971 film), a film adaptation of the stage musical
- Boy Friend (1961 film), an Indian Hindi film starring Shammi Kapoor, Madhubala and Dharmendra
- Boy Friend (1975 film), an Indian Malayalam movie released in 1975 directed by P. Venu
- "Boyfriend" (Dawson's Creek), a 1998 television episode
- "The Boyfriend" (Seinfeld), a 1992 television episode
- Boyfriends (film), a 1996 British film by Tom Hunsinger and Neil Hunter
- Boy Friend (2005 film), an Indian Malayalam film directed by Vinayan
- The Boyfriend (TV series), a 2024 Japanese reality dating show

== Music ==
=== Performers ===
- Boyfriend (musician) (born 1988), a New Orleans–based rapper/performance artist
- Boyfriend (band), a South Korean band
- Boyfriends (Filipino band)
- The Boyfriends (British band)

=== Albums ===
- The Boyfriend (album), a 1986 album by Danny Wilde
- Boyfriend, a 1989 album by Boy George
- Boyfriend, a 2004 album by 5566

=== Songs ===
- "Boyfriend" (Alphabeat song), 2007
- "Boyfriend" (Ariana Grande and Social House song), 2019
- "Boyfriend" (Ashlee Simpson song), 2005
- "Boyfriend" (Best Coast song), 2010
- "Boyfriend" (Big Time Rush song), 2010
- "Boyfriend" (Boyfriend song), 2011
- "Boyfriend" (Dove Cameron song), 2022
- "Boyfriend" (Justin Bieber song), 2012
- "Boyfriend" (Lou Bega song), 2010
- "Boyfriend" (Mabel song), 2020
- "Boyfriend" (Mai Kuraki song), 2010
- "Boyfriend" (Miki Fujimoto song), 2002
- "Boyfriend" (RaeLynn song), 2012
- "Boyfriend" (Selena Gomez song), 2020
- "Boyfriend" (Tegan and Sara song), 2016
- "Boyfriend", by Cignature, 2021
- "Boyfriend", by Hardy from A Rock, 2020
- "Boyfriend", by Schoolyard Heroes from The Funeral Sciences, 2003
- "Boyfriend", by Tyler, the Creator from Igor, 2019
- "Boyfriends", by Harry Styles from Harry's House, 2022

== Other ==
- Boyfriend (fashion), a style of women's clothing
- Boyfriend (manga), a 1985 Japanese manga series
- The Boyfriend (novel), a 2003 novel by R. Raj Rao
- Boyfriend, the player character from the indie rhythm game Friday Night Funkin'

== See also ==
- Ex-boyfriend
