= Luke Top =

Israeli-born American singer-songwriter (born 1980)

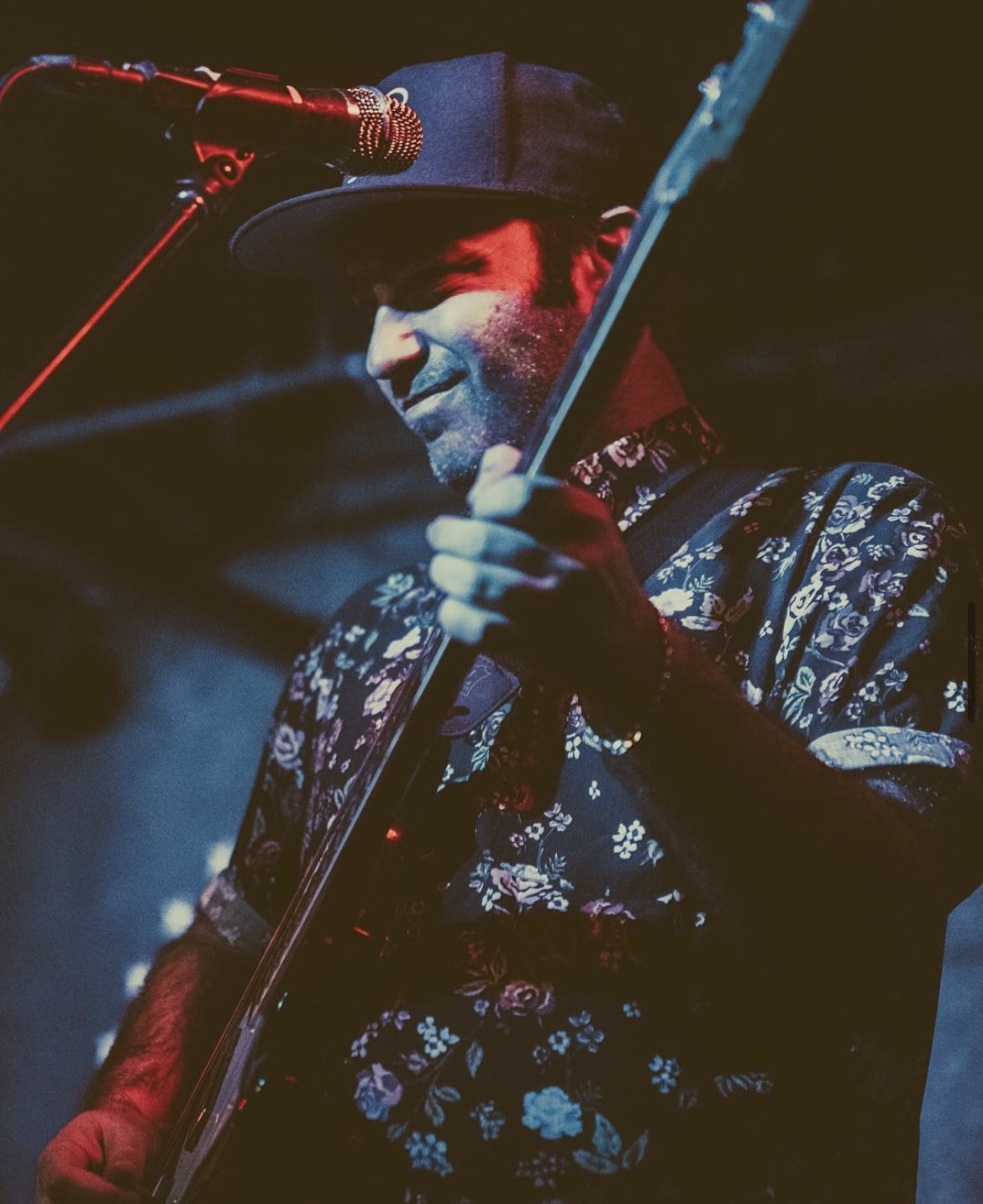

Background information
- Born: Nativ Luke Top
- Origin: Los Angeles, California
- Genres: Rock, Alternative, Pop, World, Indie
- Occupations: Record producer, songwriter, composer, musician
- Instruments: Guitar, bass, vocals
- Label: Org Music
- Member of: Fool's Gold

Luke Top (birth name Nativ Luke Top, Hebrew: נתיב לוק טופ; born May 29, 1980) is a singer-songwriter, multi-instrumentalist, record producer, and composer based in Los Angeles. He was the lead singer/bassist and one of the founding members of the afro-pop band Fool's Gold, who released 3 albums on the Iamsound label and performed both domestically and internationally, including appearances at the Glastonbury Festival, Hollywood Bowl, and Reading. In 2017 he joined as a touring member of the band Electric Guest. He also collaborates with Moby singer Mindy Jones in the ADLT VDEO project. His solo album "Suspect Highs" was released by Org Music in 2016 and followed by "The Dumb-Show" EP in 2018.

== Early life and education ==
Top was born Nativ Luke Top in Tel Aviv, Israel and immigrated to the USA when he was 3. He attended Cleveland High School in Reseda, CA. He received a B.A. in Musical and Recording Arts from San Francisco State University.

== Career ==
Top co-founded the band Fool's Gold with songwriting partner Lewis Pesacov in Los Angeles in 2008. They were signed to the Iamsound label and released 3 full-length albums. They toured both domestically and internationally with bands such as Local Natives, Edward Sharpe and the Magnetic Zeros, and the Red Hot Chili Peppers. In 2009 Top released his first solo album "Friends" which was mixed by ex-Hippos member and Vampire Weekend collaborator Ariel Rechtshaid. In 2016 he released his "Suspect Highs" album on Org Music. In 2017 he joined Electric Guest on bass, keys, and vocals in support of their second album "Plural."

== Discography (selection) ==
=== Albums ===
- Fool's Gold – Flying Lessons (performer, producer, writer)
- Fool's Gold – Fool's Gold (performer, writer)
- Fool's Gold – Leave No Trace (performer, writer)
- Foreign Born – Person To Person (performer)
- Cass McCombs – Dropping the Writ (performer, producer)
- Luke Top – Friends (performer, producer. writer)
- Luke Top – Suspect Highs (performer, producer, writer)
- Bart Davenport – Physical World (performer, producer, writer)
