= Crazy for You (Best Coast album) =

Studio album by Best Coast
- Released: July 27, 2010
- Recorded: 2009–2010 in Los Angeles
- Genres: Indie pop; surf music; garage rock; guitar pop
- Length: 31:32
- Label: Mexican Summer
- Producer: Lewis Pesacov

Best Coast chronology
Crazy for You (2010)	The Only Place (2012)

Singles from Crazy for You
- 1. "When I'm with You" Released: November 24, 2009 and April 14, 2010; 2. "Boyfriend" Released: October 18, 2010; 3. "Crazy for You" Released: January 18, 2011; 4. "Our Deal" Released: August 2, 2011

Crazy for You is the debut studio album by American indie rock duo Best Coast, released July 27, 2010 by Mexican Summer. The album was recorded by singer-songwriter Bethany Cosentino and her musical partner Bobb Bruno. It was produced, engineered, and mixed by Lewis Pesacov of Fool's Gold and Foreign Born. The album was released after a series of EPs that brought the band to underground notoriety with songs such as "The Sun Was High (So Was I)" and "When I'm with You", the latter being included in this release as a bonus track. The album artwork was created by David Rager and includes Cosentino's late cat Snacks, alongside many references to the state of California. The lyrics deal mostly with romance and relationships, with Cosentino describing them to Pitchfork as "about weed and my cat and being lazy a lot." The album was made available for streaming on July 12 at Urban Outfitters. Crazy for You was well received by music critics.

== Background ==
Best Coast was formed in 2009 by Bethany Cosentino and Bobb Bruno in Los Angeles, California. Cosentino had been around the Los Angeles music scene from a young age, and had also involved herself in talent competitions, musicals, audition tapes and commercials for Little Caesars. She began writing music at age 15, inspired by Joni Mitchell, Joan Baez and Bob Dylan, as well Weezer and Blink-182. Cosentino began uploading her music to MySpace under the name "Bethany Sharayah". She was approached and offered record deals from major labels in her teens, but resisted as they desired to mold her into a "pop princess" type. In the mid-2000s, she met Amanda Brown at the downtown LA DIY venue the Smell. Brown attempted to act as a "big sister" to Cosentino, who seemed "sort of depressed, missing music, [and] feeling a bit weird about some of her friends." The two began playing together in the experimentalist, drone group Pocahaunted. Pocahaunted's music had no traditional lyrics, and instead contained wordless vocalizations from Cosentino and Brown. The collaboration began in 2006 and released several cassette-only recordings on local label Not Not Fun. The recordings were supervised and produced by Bobb Bruno, a multi-instrumentalist stalwart in the city's music scene.

Pocahaunted achieved minor success (at one point opening for Sonic Youth), but Cosentino left the project to pursue creative writing at the Eugene Lang College The New School for Liberal Arts in New York City. Studying journalism and creative nonfiction, she read Joan Didion, David Foster Wallace and other authors she enjoyed and she interned at The Fader, where she penned a fashion column. Cosentino lived in Brooklyn and all but abandoned her musical pursuits, and soon fell into a mundane routine and seasonal depression in her second semester, feeling miserable. Having grown up on the constantly sunny and warm West Coast, she found the city "stressful, congested and cold," and based much of her nonfiction on California. Although she felt she would be letting her family and friends down by dropping out, she phoned her mother to come help her gather her belongings and return to Los Angeles over the course of a weekend in March/April 2009. Returning to La Crescenta, she lived with her mom and began work as a part-time sales associate for Lush, but felt immediately inspired to write new music, using her acoustic guitar to cope with anxiety. She informed Bruno, and the two began laying down demos in his home studio. The band's first release, "Sun Was High (And So Was I)", was released by Art Fag and was the first of a string of 7-inch singles.

The band's second 7-inch single, "When I'm with You", was financed by Black Iris, which functioned as both a music and film production agency. The track was produced, mixed, and engineered by indie-rock veteran, Lewis Pesacov. After their first experience recording with live drums and "real" production, they made a conscious effort to stray away from their original, more lo-fi and hazy sound. A collection of 7-inch singles on Art Fag and Black Iris alerted Adam Shore, owner of buzz-generating website The Daily Swarm, who became the group's manager. Jeffery Kaye, label manager of Mexican Summer, discovered the band's music online.

There are a shitload of songs about being in love with someone who doesn't love you back and I talk about weed and my cat and being lazy a lot.

— Bethany Cosentino

== Music and artwork ==
Crazy for You was recorded, mixed, and engineered for Black Iris at Mexican Radio Studios in Echo Park, California from January to April, 2010. The group's sonic goals were to emulate the Ramones in guitar tone ("really punky, messy, and sloppy-sounding"), the Beatles in percussion, and Phil Spector in vocal quality. Cosentino and Bruno used baritone guitars during recording. The theme of Crazy for You revolves around longing and heartbreak, and dealing with everyday emotions that are often left unsaid. Cosentino felt the record both a document of her own personal experiences and an homage to the music that influenced her. The songs on Crazy for You were mainly written without "intense meaning," and occasionally centralize around unrequited love. For example, "Goodbye" was inspired by Nirvana and was written when Cosentino felt "super bummed out."

The album artwork of Crazy for You features Snacks, Cosentino's cat, alongside images reflecting "the beach, hazy summertime nostalgia" and her home state of California. The cover was designed by California native David Rager, who was contacted by producer Lewis Pesacov. The two attended college in San Francisco together and he had previously designed artwork for Pesacov's band Fool's Gold. Rager was told to complete the design in a week and his only instruction is that Cosentino wanted Snacks on the cover. Rager, who lived in Paris, met the duo while on a European trek and showed them his near-complete first version, which the band chose. "They gave me a copy of the album, and I was listening to it and just working, often late at night," said Rager. "My in-laws were in town at the same time. I think a lot of it was winding down at the end of the day, having a drink, and hashing it out." The original photograph supplied of Snacks had his tail end cut off, which worked to Rager's favor: he placed an outline of California in the area to disguise the error.

== Critical reception ==
Professional ratings
Aggregate scores
Source	Rating
AnyDecentMusic?	7.6/10
Metacritic	76/100
Review scores
Source	Rating
AllMusic	4/5 stars
The A.V. Club	B
The Guardian	4/5 stars
Los Angeles Times	3.5/4 stars
MSN Music (Expert Witness)	A−
NME	8/10
Pitchfork	8.4/10
Q	3/5 stars
Rolling Stone	3.5/5 stars
Spin	8/10

Crazy for You received a nod from Exclaim! as their No. 6 pick for Top Pop & Rock Albums of 2010. Ian Gormely said "fuzzed out lo-fi recordings are all the rage, but Bethany Cosentino rises above her peers on her Best Coast debut, striking the perfect balance between reverb-drenched vocals and classic California pop hooks."

The album was also named the 39th best album of 2010 by Pitchfork.

In October 2011, NME placed "Boyfriend" at number 49 on its list "150 Best Tracks of the Past 15 Years".

== Commercial performance ==
Crazy for You, as the result of Internet buzz, became a mainstream success. The album entered the Billboard 200 at number 36 with 10,000 units sold and also debuted at No. 10 on Digital Albums. Mexican Summer focused on super-servicing mom-and-pop stores, while ensuring a presence at all digital retailers ("Boyfriend" was an iTunes free Discovery Download). Initial sales ran 50% digital, 30% CD and 20% vinyl, which gratified Mexican Summer, who began as a purely digital/vinyl outlet. It has sold 108,000 copies in US.

The album's success led to maximum exposure: "the blogosphere was suddenly abuzz with talk about her album, her tweets, her personal life, her daily habits and even one of her cats." The album also met with criticism, including charges that Cosentino's material was anti-feminist. Crazy for You and its sound, "simple and pungent songs […] toying with 1950s and ’60s melodic structures," had become something of a touchstone for Best Coast and adopted by several other bands. Cosentino hid her vocals behind layers of reverb and distortion, which was an extension of her onstage anxiety.

== Track listing ==
No.	Title	Length
1.	"Boyfriend"	2:30
2.	"Crazy for You"	1:50
3.	"The End"	2:42
4.	"Goodbye"	2:40
5.	"Summer Mood"	2:26
6.	"Our Deal"	2:08
7.	"I Want To"	2:46
8.	"When the Sun Don't Shine"	2:16
9.	"Bratty B"	1:42
10.	"Honey"	3:02
11.	"Happy"	1:44
12.	"Each and Every Day"	2:52
13.	"When I'm with You" (bonus track)	2:58

Japanese edition
No.	Title	Length
14.	"Crazy for You" (demo)
15.	"Sleepy One"

Rough Trade bonus CD
No.	Title	Length
1.	"Something in the Way"	2:08
2.	"Wish He Was You"	2:19
3.	"Far Away"	1:22

== Charts ==
=== Weekly charts ===
Chart (2010)	Peak position
Scottish Albums (Official Charts)	96
UK Albums (Official Charts)	67
US Billboard 200	36
US Digital Albums (Billboard)	10
US Top Rock Albums (Billboard)	10
US Top Alternative Albums (Billboard)	7
US Independent Albums (Billboard)	5
US Indie Store Album Sales (Billboard)	5
