= Our Bande Apart =

Studio album by Third Eye Blind
- Released: September 24, 2021
- Recorded: 2020–2021
- Length: 32:06
- Label: Mega Collider
- Producer: Stephan Jenkins; Colin CreeV

Third Eye Blind chronology
| Screamer (2019) | Our Bande Apart (2021) | Unplugged (2022) |

Singles from Our Bande Apart
- 1. "Box of Bones" Released: July 30, 2021; 2. "Again" Released: August 20, 2021; 3. "To the Sea" Released: September 16, 2021

Professional ratings
Review scores
| Source | Rating |
|---|---|
| Pitchfork | 6.9/10 |

Our Bande Apart is the seventh studio album by American rock band Third Eye Blind, released on September 24, 2021, via Mega Collider Records.

== Background ==
After releasing their sixth studio album, Screamer, in October 2019, Third Eye Blind was able to complete the first leg of the tour supporting it but was forced to cancel the second leg in 2020, due to the COVID-19 pandemic—the first time they had to cancel in 22 years. Unable to tour, the band turned to recording further music.

== Writing and recording ==
Stephan Jenkins started the writing sessions for the album in early 2020, in seclusion, under lockdown in the early days of the pandemic. Recording began as soon as the lockdowns ended and the band could reassemble. Jenkins noted the sessions were the most enjoyable he had ever experienced, due to everyone's excitement to be together and creating music again. Plans for the release initially started as an EP while recording first demos, but later expanded to a full-length album. During the sessions, guitarist Kryz Reid insisted they perform a cover of Joy Division's "Disorder" during their initial sound tests. Jenkins, surprised by the energy he felt they captured, suggested the band not only record a studio version of the cover but also release it right away in May 2020, as part of various musical artists' effort to create a tribute to Joy Division singer Ian Curtis on the fortieth anniversary of his death. Jenkins was similarly inspired to record a cover of Califone's "Funeral Singers" upon hearing Sylvan Esso's cover of it.

While writing the song "Again", Jenkins envisioned himself singing it with Bethany Cosentino of the band Best Coast. Upon finding out that Cosentino lived just a few blocks away from the Eagle Rock recording studio, Jenkins was able to convince her to sing on the track. Cosentino finished her vocals in just two takes. Jenkins originally envisioned them singing a vocal harmony but instead felt that just singing in unison captured his intended energy better. Other collaborations on the album include contributions from the Smashing Pumpkins' guitarist Jeff Schroeder, and Poliça and Marijuana Deathsquads' Ryan Olson.

== Themes and composition ==
The single "Again" was described as "breezy, power-poppy alt-rock [the band] made in the [19]90s" and a "fuzzy, catchy, punk-adjacent pop jam". Jenkins himself described it as an end-of-summer "surf rock" song. Thematically, the track is about longing for a post-COVID, normal life.

== Release and promotion ==
The album's name, Our Bande Apart, was announced on July 30, 2021, the same day as the first single, "Box of Bones", was released. The track "Again" came out on August 20. A third song, "To the Sea", was released on September 16. The album was published on September 24, 2021. A "making of the album" documentary, directed by Kryz Reid, entitled How We Hold Each Other Right Now: The Making of Our Bande Apart, premiered on the same day, at the Gramercy Theatre in New York City.

== Track listing ==
Our Bande Apart track listing
| No. | Title | Writer(s) | Length |
|---|---|---|---|
| 1. | "Goodbye to the Days of Ladies and Gentlemen" | Stephan Jenkins | 3:06 |
| 2. | "Box of Bones" | Jenkins; Colin CreeV | 3:39 |
| 3. | "Again" (featuring Bethany Cosentino) | Jenkins | 2:49 |
| 4. | "Silverlake Neophyte" | Jenkins | 3:37 |
| 5. | "Dust Storm" | Jenkins; Kryz Reid | 4:01 |
| 6. | "The Dying Blood" | Jenkins | 3:21 |
| 7. | "Funeral Singers" (Califone cover) | Tim Rutili | 4:29 |
| 8. | "To the Sea" | Jenkins; CreeV | 2:54 |
| 9. | "Time in Berlin" | Jenkins; CreeV | 4:10 |
| Total length: | | | 32:06 |

B-side
| No. | Title | Writer(s) | Length |
|---|---|---|---|
| 1. | "Disorder" | Ian Curtis; Peter Hook; Stephen Morris; Bernard Sumner | 3:34 |

== Personnel ==
Third Eye Blind

- Stephan Jenkins – vocals, guitar, drums, percussion
- Brad Hargreaves – drums
- Kryz Reid – guitar
- Alex LeCavalier – bass
- Colin CreeV – keyboards, guitar, vocals

Additional musicians

- Ryan Olson – keyboards (2, 8)
- Bethany Cosentino – vocals (3)
- Jeff Schroeder – guitar (7)
- Adam MacDougall – keyboards (1, 9)
- Mike Cottone – horns (1, 9)
- Lilly Gardner – vocals (7)
- Cassadee Pope – vocals (7)

Technical personnel

- Stephan Jenkins – producer
- Colin CreeV – producer
- Peter Min – engineering
- Curtis Peoples – additional vocal production
- Ryan Olson – additional production (2, 8), mixing (8)
- Adam MacDougall – additional production (1, 9)
- Daniel Nolan – technician
- Ryan Short – editing
- Neal Avron – mixing (2, 3, 5–7, 9)
- Carlos de la Garza – mixing (1, 4)
- Ted Jensen – mastering

Design

- David Wexler – art direction
- Jef Harmatz – illustrations, production design
- DC Hopkins – illustrations, production design
- Travis Shinn – band photo

== Charts ==
| Chart (2021) | Peak position |
|---|---|
| US Top Current Album Sales (Billboard) | 64 |
