= Lewis Pesacov =

- Born: Lewis Pesacov; November 24, 1979 (age 46)
- Origin: Los Angeles, California
- Genres: Rock, Alternative, Pop, World, Indie, Opera, Contemporary Classical
- Occupations: Record producer, songwriter, composer, musician
- Instruments: Guitar, bass, keyboards, percussion, vocals

Lewis Pesacov (born November 24, 1979) is a record producer, audio engineer, mixing engineer, multi-instrumentalist, songwriter and composer based in Los Angeles. Some of his production, songwriting, and mixing credits include Best Coast, Nikki Lane, FIDLAR, Generationals, Local Natives, Oberhofer, and was one of the founding members of the afro-pop band Fool's Gold, and indie folk-rock group Foreign Born. Pesacov was also the co-founder of the influential Echo Park-based indie label, White Iris Records, which released over thirty 7" singles, EPs and full-length albums over the course of its four years.

== Early years ==
Pesacov was born and raised in Los Angeles, California. He attended Hamilton High School in the Los Angeles Unified School District studying at both the Academy of Music and Performing Arts as well as the Humanities magnet. While focusing on classical music theory, Pesacov also played guitar in the jazz ensemble with classmates Kamasi Washington and Miles Mosley. After high school, Pesacov was awarded a scholarship to study at San Francisco State University, earning a B.A. in Music with an emphasis in theory and composition as well as a B.A. in German. Pesacov's penultimate year at university was spent studying composition in Germany at the Conservatory for Music, Trossingen and participating in the Darmstadt International Summer Courses for New Music.

== Career ==
Pesacov co-founded the band Foreign Born with songwriting partner Matt Popieluch in San Francisco in 2002. After relocating to Los Angeles in 2003, Ariel Rechtshaid joined the band on bass and they self-released their first 12" single ("We Had Pleasure" b/w "Escape"), followed by their debut EP "In the Remote Woods" via Star Time International Records. While touring the US and UK with St. Vincent, Grizzly Bear, Vampire Weekend, Rogue Wave, Jason Collett, Cold War Kids, Giant Drag, and We Are Scientists, they recorded their first full-length album, On the Wing Now, in the fall/winter of 2005, and officially released the album with Dim Mak on August 21, 2007. They released their second album, Person to Person, on Secretly Canadian on June 23, 2009.

== Selected discography ==
w – wrote, p – produced, m – mixed, e – engineered, ma – mastered, mu – musician

=== Albums ===
- Best Coast – Best Kids (p/m/e)
- Best Coast – Crazy For You (p/m/e/mu)
- FIDLAR – DIYDUI (p/m/e)
- Fool's Gold – Flying Lessons (w/p/e/mu)
- Fool's Gold – Fool's Gold (w/p/e/mu)
- Fool's Gold – Leave No Trace (w/p/e/mu)
- Foreign Born – In The Remote Woods (w/p/e/mu)
- Foreign Born – On The Wing Now (w/p/e/mu)
- Foreign Born – Person To Person (w/p/e/mu)
- The Happy Hollows – Amethyst (p/e)
- Incan Abraham – Tolerance (p/e)
- James Ferraro – Skid Row (m)
- Line & Circle – Split Figure (p/m/e)
- Nikki Lane – Walk of Shame (w/p/e/mu)
- Ski Lodge – Big Heart (p/e)
- Tancred – Nightstand (p/m/e)
- Telepathe – Destroyer (p/e)
- Valley Queen – Destroyer (p/m)

=== Singles ===
- Best Coast – "When I'm With You" b/w "This Is Real" (p/e/m)
- Guards – "Do It Again" b/w "Feels Like That" (p/e)
- Fool's Gold ft. Sizzla & Judgement Yard – "Test Dem (Poseidon Remix)" (p/m)
- Generationals – "Mythical" (m)
- Goon – "Cammie at Night" (m)
- Hands – "I Want To Know" b/w "Exactly Sharp" (p/e/m)
- HOTT MT – "Kat Kastle" b/w "Morning" (p/e/m)
- Incan Abraham – "Tuolumne" b/w "Whidbey" (p/e/m)
- Kid Wave – "Everything Changes" (p/m)
- Line & Circle – "Roman Ruins" b/w "Carelessness" (p/e/m/mu)
- Local Natives – "Wide Eyes (Remix)" (p/m)
- Oberhofer – "Gotta Go" b/w "Mahwn" (p/e/m)
- Superhumanoids – "Mikelah" b/w "Crowded Hour" (p/e/m)
- The Tracks – "Go Out Tonight" (p/m)
- Valley Queen – "Carnival" b/w "Make You Feel" (p/e/m)
- Valley Queen – "In My Place" b/w "High Expectations" (p/m)
- Valley Queen – "Stars Align" (p/m)
- Winter – "Jaded" (m)
