= Boyfriend (Best Coast song) =

- Lindstrøm remix cover

Single by Best Coast

from the album Crazy for You
- Released: June 29, 2010
- Genre: Guitar pop
- Length: 2:30
- Label: Mexican Summer
- Songwriter: Bethany Cosentino
- Producer: Lewis Pesacov

Best Coast singles chronology
"Far Away" (2010)	"Boyfriend" (2010)	"All Summer" (2010)

"Boyfriend" is a song recorded by American rock duo Best Coast and produced by Lewis Pesacov for their debut studio album Crazy for You (2010). It was released as the lead single from the album on June 29, 2010.

== Background ==
The song opens with a drum fill that the Los Angeles Times likened to the one from "Badlands" by Bruce Springsteen. Cosentino later noted this was unintentional, saying "People think we ripped it off, but Bobb claims he had no idea."

The duo performed the song in their television debut on Late Night with Jimmy Fallon on January 3, 2011.

== Reception ==
The song was released on June 29, 2010 as an iTunes free Discovery Download.

Pitchfork Media designated it Best New Track upon its release, with reviewer Larry Fitzmaurice writing, "'Boyfriend' is the latest in a string of great songs from [Best Coast]...their sun-kissed sound is here to stay, and at this point she wears it like a good pair of shades—the scrubbed-up production values are a good thing." The Chicago Tribune's Greg Kot felt the song "almost uplifting, in part because she [Cosentino]'s got the kind of strong, transparent voice that recalls the charm and innocence of the best girl-group singers of the ‘60s. She’s yearning for something she can’t have, yes, but it’s nothing a walk on the beach couldn’t cure."

Allan Raible of ABC News noted that "These two styles [surf and punk] are not often put together, but make an appealing combination."

=== Accolades ===
NME included at number 49 on its 2012 list of "150 Best Tracks of the Past 15 Years", stating "It was the timeless quality of the track that made it feel like it could have been made at any point during rock and roll’s 60-year history."

== Music video ==
The song's music video, directed by Taylor Cohen, depict Best Coast as a party band for a girl's quinceanera. The clip was shot at Kenneth Hahn Park in September 2010, and it debuted on MTV the following October. "All the other ideas we got were about me being with a dude, which seemed too straightforward and obvious," said Cosentino of the concept. She described quinceaneras in general as "very L.A., very California."

== 10th Anniversary Edition ==
In 2020 the duo rerecorded the song with LGBTQ-inclusive lyrics and released it as a single. For example, the new song opens:

I wish he was my boyfriend
I wish she was my girlfriend
I’d love them till the very end
But instead they are just a friend
I wish he was my boyfriend

The proceeds from the new song were donated to The Trevor Project, a nonprofit supporting LGBTQ+ youth.

== Formats and track listing ==
- Digital download and 12" single
1. "Boyfriend" (Lindstrøm Remix) (Extended version) – 9:06
2. "Boyfriend" (Lindstrøm Remix) (Radio edit) – 4:52
- UK CD single
1. "Boyfriend" – 2:30
