= Natural disaster (disambiguation) =

A natural disaster refers to a major adverse event resulting from natural processes of the Earth.

Natural disaster may also refer to:

- A Natural Disaster, 2003 album by Anathema
- Natural Disaster (album), by Bethany Cosentino, 2023
- "Natural Disaster" (Plain White T's song)
- "Natural Disaster" (Example song)
- "Natural Disasters", the third expansion park for the city building game Cities: Skylines

== See also ==
- The Natural Disasters, a professional wrestling tag team
