= This Head I Hold =

2012 song by Electric Guest

Single by Electric Guest

from the album Mondo
- Released: January 4, 2012
- Recorded: 2006
- Length: 2:56
- Label: Downtown Records
- Songwriter(s): Rory Uphold; Asa Taccone; Matthew Compton; Brian Burton
- Producer(s): Danger Mouse

"This Head I Hold" is the first single from Electric Guest's debut album Mondo. It was one of the best-selling singles in France of 2012.

== Lyrics and composition ==
Taccone said the song was conceived as a "constant reminder that you don’t have to follow in the steps of whatever kind of culture you’re a part of or whatever your society says you should or shouldn’t do." Taccone presented the demo to his friend, Brian Burton, with plans to give the song to a woman. Burton, however, insisted that it was too good to give away.

== Music video ==
On January 4, 2012, the band released a promotional video featuring the band playing the song live on stage. In advance of the album's release, they released a second video built around the narrative of a talent competition and a desert expedition. It was directed by Keith Schofield.

== Charts ==
=== Weekly charts ===
Chart (2012)	Peak position
France (SNEP)	37
US Alternative Songs (Billboard)	30

=== Year-end charts ===
Chart (2012)	Position
France (SNEP)	193

== Reception ==
Entertainment Weekly called it "all winking falsetto and retro swagger" that made "'hammock funk...the best new micro genre of the season." The Canberra Times said the song "seems to have been designed specifically to get you on your feet."

== Appearances in the media ==
"This Head I Hold" was used in IKEA's 2014 'Every Meal is a Special Occasion' ad. The song was also used in the 2014 film Annie.
