= Electric Guest =

American band

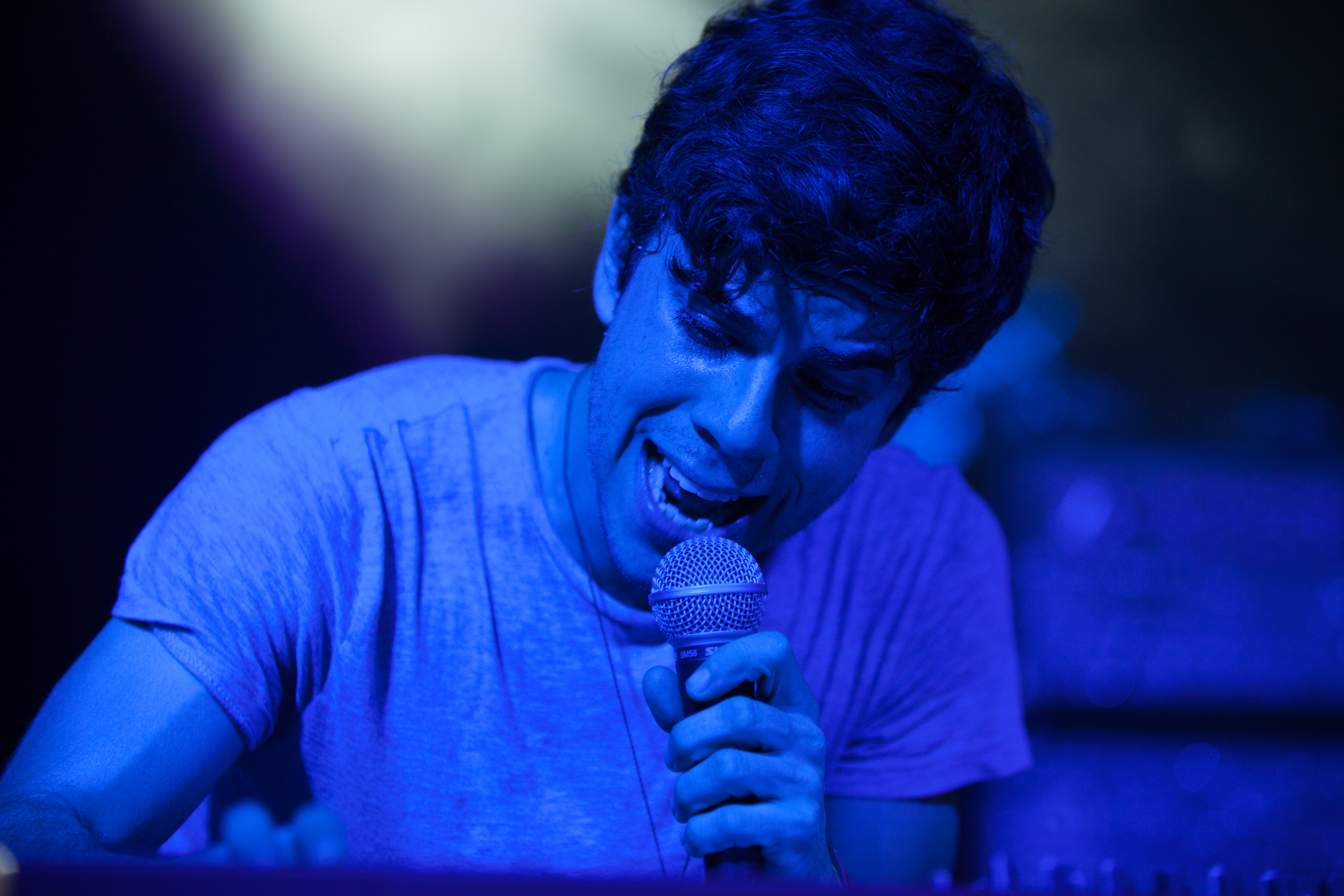
- Asa Taccone of Electric Guest performing at Montreux Jazz Festival

Background information
- Origin: Los Angeles, California, U.S.
- Genres: Indie pop; indie rock; indietronica; dream pop; electronic rock
- Years active: 2011–present
- Labels: Downtown; Because; Dew Process
- Members: Asa Taccone; Matthew Compton; Luke Top; Reese Richardson
- Past members: Tory Dahlhoff; Todd Dahlhoff
- Website: www.electricguestmusic.com

Electric Guest is a Los Angeles–based band formed in 2011. The group comprises Asa Taccone and Matthew "Cornbread" Compton. Luke Top plays bass and Reese Richardson plays keyboards/guitar in the touring version of the band. On April 24, 2012, the band released their debut album, Mondo. They released their second album, Plural, on February 17, 2017, and their third album, Kin, on October 18, 2019.

== History ==
Asa Taccone met Matthew Compton after renting a room, previously inhabited by Brian "Danger Mouse" Burton, in a large house of mostly musician tenants. Compton was a session drummer, and the two artists began to collaborate. Burton heard demos of their work and, over the span of a year, urged Taccone to make an album.

Taccone recalled an older woman once calling him "an electric guest of the universe", and used the quote as an inspiration for their band name.

They performed their single "This Head I Hold" on an April 2012 taping of the Late Show with David Letterman and have made other television appearances on Late Night with Jimmy Fallon and Conan in the United States. In the UK, they have done studio performances for Lauren Laverne, Dermot O'Leary, and Rob da Bank on BBC sessions. While they have performed live on television they have also had their music featured in popular US television shows such as Teen Wolf, HBO's award-winning Girls and Suits.

Electric Guest debuted their album Mondo in April 2012. The album is very much influenced by retro grooves from the 1970s and 1980s. As reviewed by Rolling Stone magazine, the sound of Mondo is a “Beck-ian journey into L.A. slacker soul, full of hooky neon jams that ponder fame's fraught highway and the emptiness of modern life.”

Burton co-produced Electric Guest's debut album Mondo after a year of exchanging advice and music with Asa Taccone, who happened to be a friend's younger brother. Taccone then moved to Los Angeles by taking the room Burton was moving out of. Their relationship continued, and ultimately blossomed into their collaboration on Mondo. Besides the album and singles, there has also been a popular cover of Little Dragon's 'Ritual Union' which was done for the "Like a Version" sessions for Triple J in Australia. Nu:Logic also did a remix of "This Head I Hold" on UFK Drum&Bass.

Both men have been influenced by distinct genres. Compton has noted Melody of Certain Damaged Lemons and Vu de l'extérieur as favorites, and said he grew up mostly listening to indie artists. Taccone grew up on hip/hop and soul, citing Souls Of Mischief's 93 'til Infinity album, E-40, and Mac Dre as influences. The band is notable for its pop sound that features Motown sensibilities with Taccone's falsettos.

Matthew Compton has also appeared on other artist's records, including playing drums on the track 'Wes Come Back' from Rodes Rollins' debut EP Young Adult (2017) and 'Mystery Man' (2018).

== Music videos ==
The band has released nine music videos: "This Head I Hold", "American Daydream", "The Bait", "Dear to Me", "Oh Devil", "Back for Me", "Dollar", "Play With Me" and "More".

== Reception ==
They were featured as one of twelve on MTV's list of Artists to Watch in 2012 as well as NME's Radar Band of the Week in February 2013. The Guardian said the band "specialise in soulful, funked-up pop so insidiously catchy you suspect it was designed as a homage to – even a pastiche of – the originators of the form."

== Tour ==
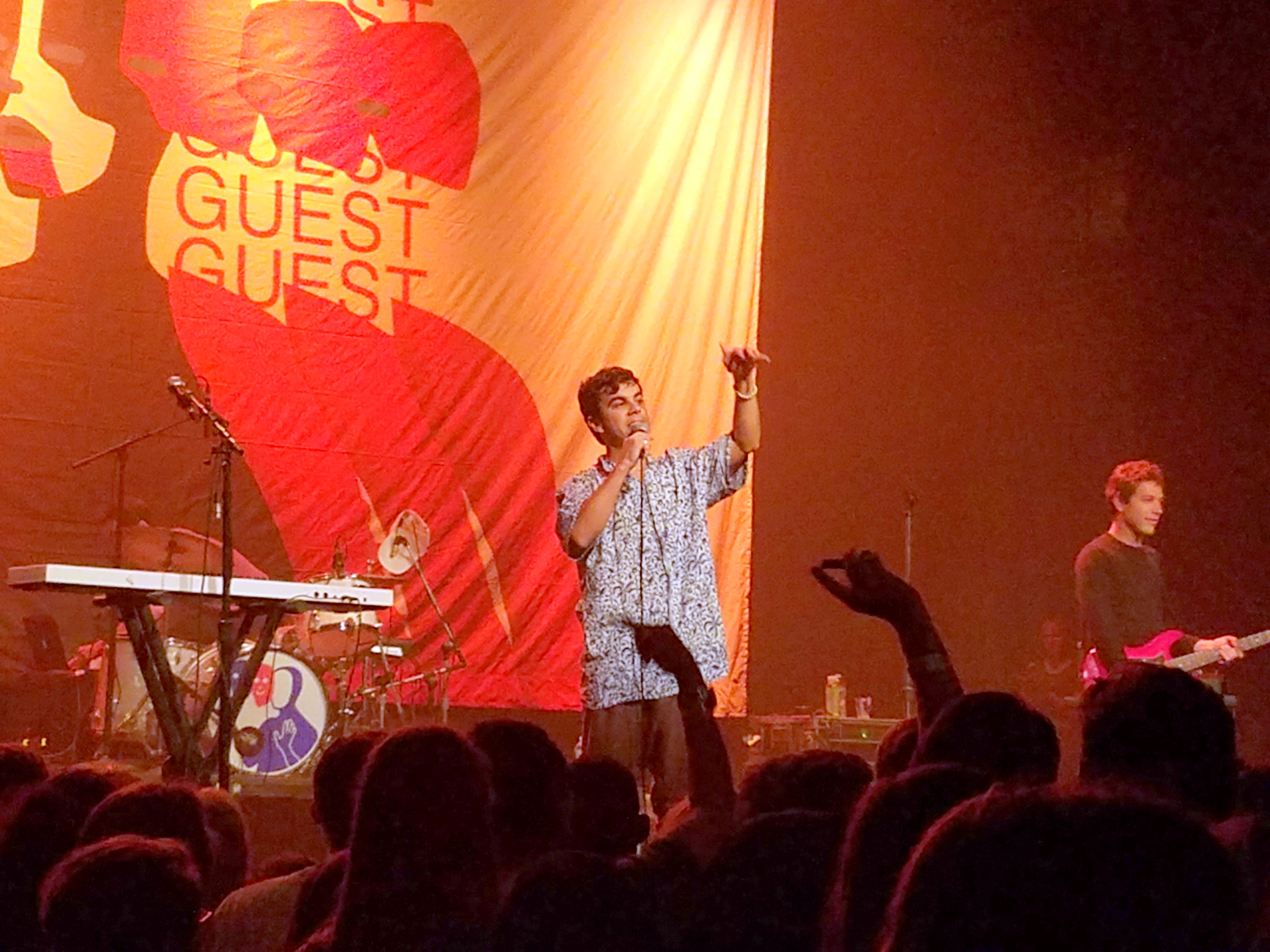
Electric Guest performing at the Jefferson in Charlottesville, Virginia on September 16, 2017.

Their Mondo tour debuted in 2012, selling out shows. Along with Taccone and Compton, keyboardist Todd Dahloff and his brother, guitarist Tory Dahloff, join the duo on tour. One tour review reads, "Real, raw, good emotion was a pumping from these fellows." In 2012 and 2013 they toured through France several times, with the last tour ending with a sold out headliner at Le Trianon venue in Paris. The UK also has a large fan base with several tours that have gone through; the most recent tour ending with a headlining sold out show at the Scala in London.

Electric Guest earned a month-long residency at the Echo in Echo Park, Los Angeles. They have made domestic festival appearances at SXSW, Bonnaroo Music Festival, Sasquatch, and the Outside Lands. Internationally, they have performed at the Montreux, Splendour in the Grass in Australia, and the Leeds Festival in the UK, as well as the Festival Printemps de Bourges, Eurockeennes, and We Love Green (all in France). In 2013, they appeared on Austin City Limits and the First City Fest. They also played at Berlin's Fashion Week as well as Cannes Film Festival.

They were a headline act for SLO Brew's 30th Anniversary Music Festival on September 8, 2018, in San Luis Obispo, California.

In 2019, they performed on popular comedy podcast Comedy Bang Bang for their holiday special, performing "Oh, Devil" and two songs from Kin.

== Members ==
- Asa Taccone – vocals, instrumentals
- Matthew "Cornbread" Compton – drums
- Luke Top – bass guitar
- Reese Richardson – guitar, keyboard

== Discography ==
=== Studio albums ===
| Title | Details | Peak chart positions | | | |
| Title | Details | US Heat | US Ind. | BEL (WA) | FRA |
|---|---|---|---|---|---|
| Mondo | Released: April 24, 2012; Label: Across the Universe, Downtown, Dew Process; Formats: Digital, CD, LP | 11 | 49 | 98 | 32 |
| Plural | Released: February 17, 2017; Label: Across the Universe, Downtown; Formats: Digital, CD, LP | 18 | — | — | 152 |
| Kin | Released: October 18, 2019; Label: Atlantic; Formats: Digital, CD, streaming | — | — | — | — |
| 10K | Released: October 10, 2025; Label: Independent Co.; Formats: Digital, CD, streaming, LP | — | — | — | — |
"—" denotes albums that did not chart, or were not released in that country.

=== Extended plays ===
| Title | Details | Peak chart positions |
| Title | Details | FRA |
|---|---|---|
| Holiday EP | Released: November 6, 2012; Label: Downtown; Formats: Digital, CD, 7" vinyl | — |
| Good America | Released: April 29, 2013; Label: Because Music; Formats: Digital, CD | 133 |
"—" denotes extended plays that did not chart, or were not released in that country.

=== Singles ===
| Title | Year | Peak chart positions | | | | | | | | | Album |
| Title | Year | US Alt | US Rock | AUS Hit. | BEL (FL) | BEL (WA) | FRA | IRE | SWI | UK | Album |
|---|---|---|---|---|---|---|---|---|---|---|---|
| "American Daydream" | 2012 | — | — | — | — | — | — | — | — | — | Mondo |
| "This Head I Hold" | 2012 | 30 | — | 20 | 84 | 56 | 37 | 93 | 96 | 196 | Mondo |
| "Holiday" | 2012 | — | — | — | — | — | — | — | — | — | Holiday EP |
| "The Jerk" / "Back on Me" | 2013 | — | — | — | — | — | — | — | — | — | Good America |
| "Dear to Me" | 2016 | — | — | — | — | — | — | — | — | — | Plural |
| "Oh Devil" | 2017 | — | 45 | — | — | — | — | — | — | — | Plural |
| "Dollar" | 2019 | — | — | — | — | — | — | — | — | — | Kin |
"—" denotes singles that did not chart, or were not released in that country.

=== Other charted songs ===
| Title | Year | Peak chart positions | | Album |
| Title | Year | BEL (FL) | FRA | Album |
|---|---|---|---|---|
| "Under the Gun" | 2012 | — | 183 | Mondo |
| "The Bait" | 2012 | 129 | — | Mondo |
"—" denotes songs that did not chart, or were not released in that country.
