= California Nights (Best Coast album) =

Studio album by Best Coast
- Released: May 1, 2015
- Studio: Wax Ltd (Hollywood, California)
- Genre: Indie pop; alternative rock
- Length: 43:22
- Label: Harvest
- Producer: Wally Gagel

Best Coast chronology
Fade Away (2013)	California Nights (2015)	Always Tomorrow (2020)

Singles from California Nights
- 1. "California Nights" Released: February 24, 2015; 2. "Heaven Sent" Released: March 11, 2015; 3. "Feeling Ok" Released: April 14, 2015; 4. "In My Eyes" Released: February 23, 2016

California Nights is the third studio album by American rock duo Best Coast. It was released on May 1, 2015, by Harvest Records. It was produced by Wally Gagel, who also produced the duo's 2013 EP Fade Away.

The band announced the album along with tour dates and the release of a "dreamlike" video directed by Adam Harding for the title track, which also served as the lead single. On the band's official website, singer-songwriter Bethany Cosentino described the band's approach to the making of the album, stating: "In LA, there's a real darkness that you don't see unless you know where to look. That's a theme we very consciously decided to explore and play with when making this record. We related to the idea that things may look or sound fun and upbeat, but they may not actually always be that way."

A video for second single "Heaven Sent" directed by Lana Kim and Cosentino was released on April 1, 2015. Third single "Feeling Ok" followed in mid-April, which the duo performed on Conan on May 5. "In My Eyes" was serviced to US alternative radio on February 23, 2016, as the album's fourth single.

Two outtakes from the album sessions, "Late 20s" and "Bigger Man", were released on an exclusive Record Store Day release in April 2016.

== Critical reception ==
Professional ratings
Aggregate scores
Source	Rating
Metacritic	69/100
Review scores
Source	Rating
AllMusic	4/5 stars
Consequence of Sound	B−
Drowned in Sound	5/10
The Guardian	3/5 stars
Los Angeles Times	3/4 stars
NME	7/10
Pitchfork	6.4/10
PopMatters	7/10
Rolling Stone	3.5/5 stars
Spin	8/10

California Nights has received generally positive reviews from music critics. At Metacritic, which assigns a weighted mean rating out of 100 to reviews from mainstream critics, the album has received an average score of 69 based on 26 reviews, which indicates "generally favorable reviews".

== Track listing ==
All tracks are written by Bethany Cosentino.

No.	Title	Length
1.	"Feeling Ok"	3:16
2.	"Fine Without You"	3:21
3.	"Heaven Sent"	3:25
4.	"In My Eyes"	3:46
5.	"So Unaware"	3:03
6.	"When Will I Change"	3:52
7.	"Jealousy"	3:27
8.	"California Nights"	5:11
9.	"Fading Fast"	2:11
10.	"Run Through My Head"	4:00
11.	"Sleep Won't Ever Come"	3:58
12.	"Wasted Time"	3:52
Total length:		43:22

== Personnel ==
Credits adapted from the liner notes of California Nights.

Best Coast

- Bethany Cosentino – guitar, vocals
- Bobb Bruno – guitar, bass, keyboards

Technical

- Wally Gagel – production, recording, mixing
- Seth Olansky – assistance
- Vincent Silva – assistance
- Howie Weinberg – mastering
- Gentry Studer – mastering assistance

Additional musicians

- Brady Miller – drums, guitar, percussion, keyboards

Artwork

- Janell Shirtcliff – photography
- Lawrence Azerrad – design

== Charts ==
Chart (2015)	Peak position
Australian Albums (ARIA)	43
US Billboard 200	53
US Independent Albums (Billboard)	3
US Top Alternative Albums (Billboard)	4
US Top Rock Albums (Billboard)	5

== Release history ==
Region	Date	Format	Label
Australia	May 1, 2015	CD; digital download	Capitol
Germany	May 1, 2015	CD; digital download	Capitol
United Kingdom	May 4, 2015	CD; digital download	Virgin EMI
United States	May 4, 2015	CD; digital download	Harvest
