= Leave No Trace (album) =

Studio album by Fool's Gold
- Released: August 16, 2011
- Recorded: 2010 at Infrasonic Recording Studio, Los Angeles, California
- Genre: World, tropical, indie
- Length: 43:23
- Label: IAMSOUND

Fool's Gold chronology
Fool's Gold (2009)	Leave No Trace (2011)	Flying Lessons (2015)

Leave No Trace is the second studio album by the American indie band Fool's Gold. It was released on August 16, 2011 by IAMSOUND Records in the United States.

== Reception ==
Professional ratings
Aggregate scores
Source	Rating
Metacritic	66/100
Review scores
Source	Rating
AllMusic	3/5 stars
The A.V. Club	C+
Clash	7/10
Consequence of Sound	C+
Filter	77%
The Guardian	4/5 stars
Pitchfork Media	6.2/10
PopMatters	5/10 stars
Spin	6/10 stars
Under the Radar	6/10 stars

Leave No Trace received mixed to positive reviews from critics. The album holds a score of 66/100 based on 21 reviews, indicating "generally favorable reviews".

Spin gave "Leave No Trace" a score of 6/10. Critic Marc Hogan writes, "this Los Angeles quintet distilled a refreshing blend of African influences and Hebrew-language vocals on their 2009 self-titled debut...Though still sunny and hooky, 'Leave No Trace' lacks the enigmatic spark of its predecessor, especially now that the words are more readily understandable."

== Track listing ==
All songs written by Luke Top & Lewis Pesacov.

1. "The Dive"
2. "Wild Window"
3. "Street Clothes"
4. "Leave No Trace"
5. "Balmy"
6. "Narrow Sun"
7. "Tel Aviv"
8. "Mammal"
9. "Bark & Bite"
10. "Lantern"
