= Fade Away (Best Coast EP) =

EP by Best Coast
- Released: October 22, 2013
- Recorded: 2013
- Studio: Wax Ltd (Hollywood, California)
- Genre: Alternative rock; jangle pop
- Length: 27:02
- Label: Jewel City
- Producer: Wally Gagel

Best Coast chronology
The Only Place (2012)	Fade Away (2013)	California Nights (2015)

Singles from Fade Away
- 1. "Fear of My Identity"/"Who Have I Become?" Released: April 20, 2013

Fade Away is the sixth extended play (EP) by American indie rock duo Best Coast. It was released on October 22, 2013, on frontwoman Bethany Cosentino's label Jewel City. Produced by Wally Gagel, the EP was recorded at Wax Ltd's studios, and was inspired by musical acts like Mazzy Star, Patsy Cline, and My Bloody Valentine. Cosentino wrote the song "Fear of My Identity" about "having an existential crisis" after using the sedative Ambien.

== Critical response ==
Professional ratings
Aggregate scores
Source	Rating
Metacritic	67/100
Review scores
Source	Rating
AllMusic	3/5 stars
Alternative Press	4.5/5 stars
Consequence of Sound	D
DIY	3/5 stars
Drowned in Sound	3/10
Exclaim!	7/10
The Fly	3/5 stars
NME	6/10
Pitchfork	7.4/10
Rolling Stone	4/5 stars

Fade Away received generally positive reviews from music critics. At Metacritic, which assigns a normalized rating out of 100 to reviews from mainstream publications, the EP received an average score of 67, based on 15 reviews.

Jon Dolan of Rolling Stone viewed Fade Away as a combination of the band's first two albums, describing it as "masterfully archetypal but utterly [Cosentino's] own." Alternative Press called the EP the band's "best work to date", remarking, "Lyrically introspective, musically tight and vocally resolute [...] Fade Away sounds like a reclamation record for Bethany Cosentino." Pitchfork deemed it a return to form for the band, noting that "[t]here are touches of sophistication across Fade Away that Best Coast haven't been able to achieve until now."

=== Accolades ===
Rolling Stone placed Fade Away at number 35 on their list of the 50 Best Albums of 2013, writing, "It's just seven songs but still felt like a breakthrough."

== Track listing ==
All tracks are written by Bethany Cosentino.

No.	Title	Length
1.	"This Lonely Morning"	2:41
2.	"I Wanna Know"	3:28
3.	"Who Have I Become?"	4:53
4.	"Fear of My Identity"	3:38
5.	"Fade Away"	4:18
6.	"Baby I'm Crying"	4:30
7.	"I Don't Know How"	3:34

== Personnel ==
Credits adapted from the liner notes of Fade Away.

Best Coast

- Bethany Cosentino – vocals, guitars, keyboards
- Bobb Bruno – guitars, bass

Additional musicians

- Brady Miller – drums
- Ricky Cosentino – drums on "Who Have I Become?" and "Fear of My Identity"
- Brett Mielke – lap steel, 12-string electric guitar
- Xandy Barry – piano

Technical

- Wally Gagel – production, engineering, mixing
- Xandy Barry – additional engineering
- Pete Lyman – mastering

Artwork

- Bryan Collins – artwork

== Charts ==
Chart (2013)	Peak position
US Billboard 200	122
