= The Only Place =

Studio album by Best Coast
- Released: May 15, 2012
- Recorded: 2011–12
- Studio: Capitol Studio B (Hollywood)
- Genre: Pop rock; jangle pop
- Length: 34:20
- Label: Mexican Summer
- Producer: Jon Brion

Best Coast chronology
Crazy for You (2010)	The Only Place (2012)	Fade Away (2013)

Singles from The Only Place
- 1. "The Only Place" Released: March 26, 2012; 2. "Why I Cry" Released: April 17, 2012; 3. "Do You Love Me Like You Used To" Released: November 9, 2012

The Only Place is the second studio album by American indie rock duo Best Coast, released on May 15, 2012 by Mexican Summer. Produced by Jon Brion, the album was recorded at Capitol Studios in Los Angeles, California. The album was primarily inspired by the upheaval following the unexpected success of Crazy for You. To this end, the duo attempted to distance themselves from the lo-fi aesthetic of their first release by working with producer Jon Brion. Recorded at Capitol Studios in Los Angeles, The Only Place was inspired by 1960s country music and Fleetwood Mac.

The record received generally favorable reviews from music critics, although many reviewers were divided in their reception of the record's polished sound.

== Background ==
Following the release of the band's debut album, Crazy for You (2010), the band embarked upon an extensive touring schedule, which subsequently inspired the lyrical content of The Only Place. Cosentino felt that her life had dramatically changed in the two years following its release, having never spent so much time away from home. Alongside the quick, thunderous success came an intense level of scrutiny, vocal Internet haters and venom from selected critics, some of whom viewed Cosentino's material as anti-feminist. Crazy for You and its sound, "simple and pungent songs ... toying with 1950s and ’60s melodic structures," had become something of a touchstone for Best Coast and adopted by several other bands. Cosentino hid her vocals behind layers of reverb and distortion, which was an extension of her onstage anxiety. As a result, Cosentino desired to take their sophomore record in a completely different direction.

== Recording and production ==
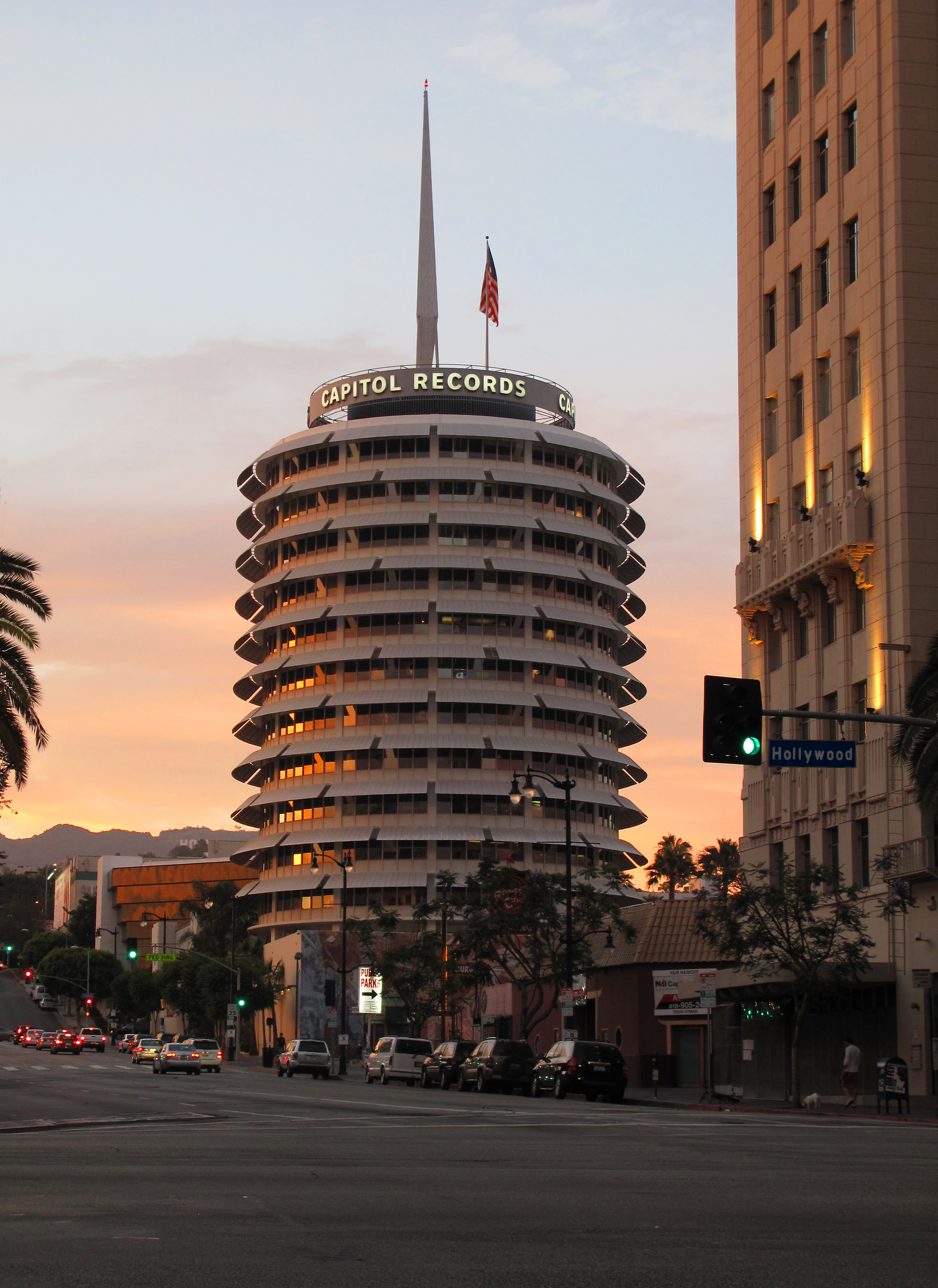
The Only Place was recorded at Capitol Studios in Los Angeles, known for its history with Frank Sinatra and The Beach Boys.

The Only Place was recorded at Capitol Records Studio B in Los Angeles, California. Cosentino and Bruno felt the production process for The Only Place was marked by a level of seriousness. While previous recording sessions were marked by goofing off and drinking, the duo took their sophomore effort more seriously and strove to create a different sound. Cosentino was reluctant to make her lyrics completely honest, but was inspired by Drake's Take Care to take a chance. "I’m going to make this record like a rapper would make it, or at least how Drake would make it," she found. Cosentino felt being more honest and relatable could better connect the listener. The record was inspired by traditional country music, which was listened to frequently during its production. Cosentino wanted to create a "weird spin on '60s country stuff like Loretta Lynn, Dusty Springfield [and] Patsy Cline." The duo also cited the Eagles and Fleetwood Mac as influences for the record. Cosentino jokingly compared the production process of The Only Place to Fleetwood Mac's Rumours (1977): "It was very epic for us. Except our studio experience was not doing cocaine until five in the morning; it was eating guacamole until five in the morning. And we had parking spaces."

The duo had a desire to create a record that "nobody was going to call lo-fi," and Bruno reached out to his former boss, producer/composer Jon Brion, known for his work on Kanye West's Late Registration (2005). Bruno had worked as Brion's personal assistant nearly a decade prior; the partnership clicked when the producer sat in on keyboards during a February 2011 Best Coast gig in L.A. The decision to work with producer Jon Brion was an effort to bring polish to the mixes. Brion, who admired Crazy for You and its production, largely hoped to stay out of the way during sessions, only hoping to bring out Cosentino's vocals and hear the low-end of mixes more. Brion noted that the duo "were curious to not use the reverb thing as a crutch." Brion equipped the duo with vintage analog gear, and attempted to make great use of the studio's Les Paul-designed reverb chambers. Brion noted that Cosentino and Bruno "have a secret language," and he merely suggested a few different guitars.

== Music and artwork ==
Title track The Only Place has been described as a "summery, jangly love letter to California" that is "bigger in sound and scope" than Crazy for You. The cover illustration, a brown bear (the state animal) embracing the state of California, is a modified version of the artwork on the sheet music for the state song, "I Love You, California" (1913).

== Music video ==
The band released a music video for the song, "The Only Place" in June, 2012. The video was directed by Ace Norton and featured Cosentino and Bruno representing California driving with their top down, playing on the sand, make blended beverages out of fruit.

== Critical reception ==
Professional ratings
Aggregate scores
Source	Rating
Metacritic	66/100
Review scores
Source	Rating
AllMusic	2.5/5 stars
The A.V. Club	B−
NME	4/10
Pitchfork	6.2/10
Spin	8/10

According to aggregate website Metacritic, based on 34 professional reviews, the album currently holds an average score of 66 out of 100, indicating "generally favorable reviews". In his review for Spin, Jon Young writes "The Only Place delivers riveting drama in a rousing pop package, with Brion rescuing Best Coast from the fuzzed-out, lo-fi indie template, cleaning up their sound and enhancing the potential for mainstream appeal exponentially without diminishing their artistic credibility", and awarded the album 8 out of a possible 10. Negative reviews seemed to have focused on Cosentino's lyricism. Ben Hewitt, writing for NME, gave The Only Place 4 out of a possible 10. He stated, "The swoonsome charm of Best Coast's debut, Crazy For You, was in its feel-good slacker vibes rather than its invention, but here they're going through the motions ... with mechanical jangly pop and the wince-inducing triteness of Cosentino's lyrics." Mark Richardson, writing for Pitchfork Media, gave The Only Place 6.2 out of a possible 10. He ended his review by describing the album as "a grinding sense of marks being hit while inspiration is in short order." Evan Rytlewski, writing for The A.V. Club, gave The Only Place a B−. He noted that, "Cosentino has strengthened her voice and revealed real emotional range. Maybe on album No. 3 she’ll start practicing some new rhyme schemes, too."

The album was listed at number 14 on Rolling Stone's list of the top 50 albums of 2012, saying "With less reverb-y guitar haze to hide behind, her voice comes into its own as one of indie rock's mightiest."

== Track listing ==
All tracks are written by Bethany Cosentino.

No.	Title	Length
1.	"The Only Place"	2:40
2.	"Why I Cry"	2:17
3.	"Last Year"	3:33
4.	"My Life"	2:12
5.	"No One Like You"	3:02
6.	"How They Want Me to Be"	3:52
7.	"Better Girl"	2:54
8.	"Do You Love Me Like You Used To"	3:16
9.	"Dreaming My Life Away"	3:22
10.	"Let's Go Home"	2:35
11.	"Up All Night"	4:37

Digital deluxe edition bonus tracks
No.	Title	Length
12.	"Mean Girls"	3:40
13.	"Angsty"	2:53
Total length:		40:53

Australian edition bonus tracks
No.	Title	Length
12.	"Angsty"	2:53
13.	"Storms" (Fleetwood Mac cover; written by Stevie Nicks)	4:14
14.	"How They Want Me to Be" (original demo)	3:47
Total length:		45:14

== Personnel ==
=== Best Coast ===
- Bethany Cosentino – vocals, guitar
- Bobb Bruno – drums, guitar, bass guitar

=== Additional musicians ===
- Jon Brion – percussion, keyboards, 12-string guitar, lap steel, six-string bass

=== Recording personnel ===
- Jon Brion – producer
- Greg Koller – engineer, mixing
- Eric Caudieux – editor
- Jake Gorski – assistant engineer
- Chandler Harrod – assistant engineer
- Patricia Sullivan – mastering

=== Artwork ===
- Dan Schechter – art direction, design
- David Black – in-studio photography
- Jess Rotter – landscape illustration

== Charts ==
Chart (2012)	Peak position
Australian Albums (ARIA)	65
Irish Albums (IRMA)	86
Irish Independent Albums (IRMA)	12
Scottish Albums (OCC)	58
UK Albums (OCC)	55
UK Independent Albums (OCC)	7
US Billboard 200	24
US Independent Albums (Billboard)	5
US Top Alternative Albums (Billboard)	6
US Top Rock Albums (Billboard)	10
