= Mondo (album) =

Studio album by Electric Guest
- Released: April 24, 2012
- Recorded: 2006–2012
- Genre: Indie rock; indie pop; indietronica; electronic rock; psychedelic pop
- Label: Across the Universe; Downtown
- Producer: Danger Mouse

Singles from Mondo
- 1. "This Head I Hold" Released: 4 January 2012; 2. "Troubleman" Released: 2012

Professional ratings
Aggregate scores
Source	Rating
Metacritic	59/100
Review scores
Source	Rating
Beats per Minute	84%
Daily Express	5/5
Drowned in Sound	6/10
Islington Gazette	4/5 stars
Loud and Quiet	8/10
musicOMH	3/5 stars
Pitchfork Media	4.6/10
PopMatters	6/10
Rolling Stone	3/5 stars

Mondo is the debut studio album of Los Angeles–based indie pop band Electric Guest. It was released on April 24, 2012 on Downtown Records and Across The Universe labels.

The single, "This Head I Hold" was featured on an episode of Dancing with the Stars, as well as in an ad for Crate & Barrel. The song "Awake" is featured in the soundtrack of the 2012 video game Forza Horizon.

== Development and release ==
Mondo features heavy production, and draws from genres such as synth-pop, R&B, Motown-style soul, slacker California rock, psychedelia, and bubblegum pop. With encouragement from Brian "Danger Mouse" Burton, Asa Taccone and his roommate, Michael Compton, refined their songs into an album from 2009 to 2011.

== Track listing ==
1. "Holes" (2:45)
2. "This Head I Hold" (2:55)
3. "Under the Gun" (3:42)
4. "Awake" (5:00)
5. "Amber" (3:50)
6. "The Bait" (3:06)
7. "Waves" (3:06)
8. "Troubleman" (8:48)
9. "American Daydream" (2:48)
10. "Control" (2:18)
11. "Holiday" (3:08) [Japan Bonus Track]
12. "Jenny" (4:15) [Japan Bonus Track]

== Charts ==
Chart (2012)	Peak position
French Albums (SNEP)	32
US Heatseekers Albums (Billboard)	11
US Independent Albums (Billboard)	49

== Reception ==
Reviews for Mondo were mixed. The New York Times called the album "recession-era pop" with "wistful ballads, that are far more concerned about careers and ethical choices than about the ups and downs of love." Despite questioning the album's sincerity, Rolling Stone called the album "L.A. slacker soul, full of hooky neon jams" and "sonic wit." In one tepid review, PopMatters asserted that Mondo "serves as much as an introduction to a promising new as it does a reminder of a major producing talent." Less flatteringly, and remarking on Taccone's numerous connections in the music industry, Pitchfork said Mondo is a "cautionary tale of what happens when a 'hit record' forgets to actually include hits."
