= Natural Disaster (album) =

Studio album by Bethany Cosentino
- Released: July 28, 2023
- Studio: Butch Walker's studio, Nashville, Tennessee
- Genre: Pop rock; folk rock; Americana
- Length: 41:49
- Label: Concord
- Producer: Butch Walker; Davis Naish

Singles from Natural Disaster
- 1. "It's Fine" Released: May 3, 2023; 2. "Easy" Released: June 16, 2023; 3. "For a Moment" Released: July 6, 2023; 4. "Natural Disaster" Released: July 25, 2023

Natural Disaster is the solo debut album by Bethany Cosentino, best known as one half of the Los Angeles rock duo Best Coast. It was released on July 28, 2023, by Concord Records. The album announcement came the same day that Cosentino confirmed she was putting Best Coast on indefinite hiatus as she focused on her solo career. The album was mainly produced by Butch Walker, except for the closing track which was produced by Davis Naish.

== Background and release ==
Cosentino had been a member of the duo Best Coast for over a decade when she decided to put the group on hiatus, announced the same day as the album. Cosentino said the hiatus was inspired by her need to find her own identity outside of the group.

Natural Disaster was announced on May 3, 2023, with its release date set for July 28 by Concord Records. With the announcement came the album's lead single, "It's Fine", and a music video directed by Janell Shirtcliff. The second single, "Easy", was released on June 16. The third single, "For a Moment", was released on July 6, featuring vocals from her cowriters Madi Diaz, Kate York, and Sarah Buxton. The fourth single, the title track, was released on July 25, with a music video directed by Aaron Preusch which depicts Cosentino dancing in front of projected footage of landscapes and fires.

== Writing and recording ==
Cosentino wrote the album in Nashville and Los Angeles. The album was produced by Butch Walker, and recorded in his Nashville studio. "It's Fine" was the first single written for the album, inspired by Cosentino having "seen something on the internet that really pissed me off" and deciding to write a song on her guitar rather than respond angrily on Twitter. Cosentino was originally planning on working with Carlos de la Garza, who had produced Best Coast's last album Always Tomorrow, but determined that Walker's background in alt country and Americana would fit better. Cosentino sent Walker a demo of "It's Fine" which Walker produced into the version that made the final album.

Cosentino made a mood board for the album which included numerous elements from the film Thelma & Louise. She was also influenced by the film Defending Your Life.

== Style ==
The album combines pop rock, folk rock, and Americana, with additional influences of country. Influences on its sound include Bonnie Raitt, Sheryl Crow, and Jewel.

The album's lyricism is more direct than her usual work with Best Coast. One of the album's major lyrical themes is climate change, involving frequent references to fire and drought juxtaposed with "girl group sha-la-las" and "descriptions that evoke a vaguely pre-apocalyptic landscape" on the opening track.

== Reception ==
Natural Disaster ratings
Aggregate scores
Source	Rating
AnyDecentMusic?	7.2/10
Metacritic	74/100
Review scores
Source	Rating
AllMusic	4.5/5 stars
Clash	6/10
DIY	4.5/5 stars
Dork	4/5 stars
Exclaim!	7/10
The Guardian	3/5 stars
The Line of Best Fit	8/10
NME	4/5 stars
Pitchfork	5.9/10
Riff	8/10

According to the review aggregator Metacritic, Natural Disaster received "generally favorable reviews" based on a weighted average score of 74 out of 100 from 11 critic scores.

Exclaim!'s Kate Shepherd wrote that with the album, Cosentino had "crafted an artifact that will feel at once familiar to those who followed her work with Best Coast and also distinctly her own, merging vulnerability with a dry sense of humour, and deploying to full effect her well-honed skill for blending sincere nostalgia with her own brand of millennial irony." The Line of Best Fit's Joshua Mills wrote that while the "downtempo tunes" such as "It's a Journey" "are a little hit-and-miss", the album "brims with the artist's personality and is a delight to connect with." Mills highlighted Cosentino's ability to know "exactly what kind of sparkling, big-hearted album she wanted to make", and the combination of her "acidity" with Walker's "polish" which "delivers way more often than not."

=== Year-end lists ===
Natural Disaster on year-end lists
Publication	#	Ref.
AllMusic	—N/a	
Dork	49	

== Track listing ==
All tracks are written by Bethany Cosentino with others noted. All tracks produced by Butch Walker, except track 12 by Davis Naish.

Natural Disaster track listing
No.	Title	Writer(s)	Length
1.	"Natural Disaster"	Charlie Brand; Suzy Shinn	3:38
2.	"Outta Time"	Kate York; Morgan Nagler	3:55
3.	"It's Fine"	Walker	3:46
4.	"Easy"	Walker	3:44
5.	"A Single Day"	Jeff Trott; Sean McConnell	2:48
6.	"My Own City"	York; Nagler	3:15
7.	"For a Moment"	Madi Diaz; York; Sarah Buxton	3:53
8.	"Calling on Angels"	Walker	3:17
9.	"Real Life"	Ruston Kelly	3:20
10.	"Hope You're Happy Now"	Walker; Mike Viola	3:27
11.	"It's a Journey"	Nagler	3:59
12.	"I've Got News for You"	Davis Naish	2:47
Total length:			41:49

== Personnel ==
- Bethany Cosentino – lead vocals, backing vocals
- Butch Walker – producer (1–11), recording engineer (1–11), bass guitar (1–11), guitar (1–11), keyboards (1–11), percussion (1–11), piano (1–11), drums (1, 3, 4, 6, 9, 10)
- Davis Naish – producer (12), recording engineer (12), piano (12)
- Lars Stalfors – mixing engineer
- Pete Lyman – mastering engineer
- Mark Stepro – drums (2, 4, 8, 10, 11)
- Billy Justineau – Hammond B3 (2, 8)
- Val McCallum – guitar (4)
- Mickey Rafael – harmonica (4, 5)
- Ellen Angelico – baritone guitar (5, 7), mandolin (5, 7), pedal steel guitar (5, 7)
- Jeff Trott – guitar (5)
- Nick Bockrath – guitar (5, 7)
- Eric Slick – drums (5, 7)
- Madi Diaz, Kate York, and Sarah Buxton – backing vocals (7)
