= Disorder (song) =

Song by Joy Division

from the album Unknown Pleasures
- Released: 15 June 1979
- Recorded: April 1979
- Studio: Strawberry Studios, Manchester
- Genre: Post-punk; punk rock
- Length: 3:36
- Label: Factory
- Songwriters: Ian Curtis; Peter Hook; Bernard Sumner; Stephen Morris
- Producer: Martin Hannett

Audio sample
- file; help

"Disorder" is a song by English rock band Joy Division, released as the opening track of their 1979 debut album Unknown Pleasures. It was co-written by band members Ian Curtis (vocals and lyrics), Peter Hook (bass guitar), Bernard Sumner (guitar) and Stephen Morris (drums). The music for the track emerged through their usual method of jamming through long practice sessions, and had been played live a number of times before its studio recording. It was produced and engineered by Martin Hannett, who was also a partner at the band's label Factory Records.

Although the band were initially unhappy with the production, believing Hannett's stripped down recording reduced the power that the drums and guitar gave it had when played live, the song has become a classic of post-punk and alternative music, and along with the band's "She's Lost Control" is considered a peak of Hannett's career.

The track was recorded in early April 1979 at Strawberry Studios in Stockport, as the first track recorded for the album. Early on its production led to a major disagreement between the group and Hannett as to how the album was to sound. Joy Division favoured the heavy guitar attack dynamics of their live performances, while Hannett sought a more pared back, spectral sound, achieved through stripping back and isolating each instrument.

== Recording ==
Unknown Pleasures was recorded at Strawberry Studios in Stockport, between 1–17 April 1979. The group were then relatively inexperienced with studio recording techniques, having recorded just the low budget EP An Ideal for Living, and two Peel Sessions. As with many of the album's tracks, "Disorder" was written months before the sessions, and its sound and pace had been developed over a series of live performances.

Bassist Peter Hook admits that the recorded version of the song contains a number of bum notes when he missed some of the higher notes on the A and D strings. He puts this down to Factory Records not having much money for studio time, and thus the band had only a few takes for each track. Nevertheless, he believes now that they add to the mood of the track, and says that he "can't imagine "Disorder" without them".

== Music and lyrics ==
The high tempo song begins with an echo-laden drum pattern played on tom toms. Hannett creates space by widely panning the drums on the audio spectrum, and giving the left hand track a "murky and distant" feel, while leaving the right hand track with a brighter and more immediate sound.

As Joy Division began to experiment with synthesisers after the album's release, Morris began to use a Synare 3 drum machine during live performances to create a "sci-fi whup-whup siren intro" for "Disorder".

Critics and remaining band members have debated whether the opening lines "I’ve been waiting for a guide to come and take me by the hand" refer directly to Curtis' epilepsy, or more generally to his struggles with depression. In his July 1979 review for Melody Maker, critic Jon Savage describes the closing vocal line of "Feeling feeling feeling" as sung "in the exact tones of someone who’s not sure he has any left."

== Reception and influence ==
In 2015 "Disorder" was named number one on The Guardian's list of the top 10 Joy Division songs. It has been widely covered, notably during a 2010 collaboration between Xiu Xiu and Deerhoof, and by Bedhead.

Looking back in 2013, Joy Division bassist and songwriter Peter Hook regretted that the song had not been released as a single, believing it was good enough to have built enough interest on the alternative music scene to allow their eventual first single "Transmission" to crossover into the UK Singles Chart.

The melody of "Disorder" was interpolated into the 2018 song "Give Yourself a Try" by The 1975.

== Certifications ==
Certifications and sales for "Disorder"
Region	Certification	Certified units/sales
New Zealand (RMNZ)	Gold	15,000^{‡}
^{‡} Sales+streaming figures based on certification alone.
