= Judgement Yard =

Harare-based Dancehall and reggae group made up of music DJs

- Origin: Warren Park, Harare, Zimbabwe
- Genres: Reggae; Dancehall; Zimdancehall
- Years active: 2008-present
- Members: I-Randu; DJ bravo; DJ 2Bad; Abisha Palmer; Mc Tawastok aka Short Boss
- Website: zijudgementyard.com

Judgement Yard is a Harare-based Dancehall and reggae group made up of music DJs.

== History ==
Judgement Yard was founded by Youngson Kudita also known as I-Randu in 2009 and consists of music DJs; I-Randu, DJ Flevah, Etherton Bennie, DJ 2Bad and Mc Tawastok aka Short Boss.

In 2013, they performed in Cape Town, South Africa. This was their very first foreign tour. In early 2015, they made their debut appearance at the Zimbabwe Cup Clash, an annual musical show held in the United Kingdom.

In 2018, they performed at Marafco Lounge in Pretoria, South Africa. This was their second tour of the country after a one legged Cape Town tour in 2013. They have also performed in other various countries, including Australia, Dubai, Cyprus and Botswana. They have released a number of mixtapes which have featured various local Zimdancehall artists and international musicians from the reggae and dancehall genres. They also host one of the most popular radio shows in the country on ZiFM Stereo.
