= Fool's Gold (band) =

American musical collective

- Origin: Los Angeles, California
- Genres: World, Tropical, Indie
- Years active: 2007–present
- Labels: IAMSOUND Records, Org Music
- Members: Luke Top; Lewis Pesacov; Garrett Ray; Brad Caulkins; Salvador Placencia
- Past members: Extended Fool's Gold Family; Matt Popieluch; Orpheo McCord; Jimmy Vincent; Amir Kenan; Michael Tapper; Érica García

Fool's Gold is an American musical collective that combines Western pop with African and Middle Eastern music. The group started as a side project of musicians Luke Top (a vocalist and bassist) and Lewis Pesacov (lead guitarist), who set out to explore their shared love of various forms of African music (specifically Congolese, Ethiopian, Eritrean and Malian), Krautrock, and 1980s dance influenced pop music.

== History ==
=== Formation ===
The band was formed initially as a collaboration between Top and Pesacov in 2007. Top had immigrated to Los Angeles from Israel at age three and earned his B.A. in Music and Recording at SFSU. Pesacov earned a degree in classical music theory and composition while studying under American composers Mark Randall-Osborn and Franklin Cox. Joining their cultural and musical backgrounds, the two began writing songs together, many of which would eventually appear on their self-titled debut album in 2009.

Top has said that the band's name came from a trip he and Pesacov took to Northern California in which a mutual friend described a time when she found fool's gold in the ocean.

Fool's Gold expanded to a sizable band composed of numerous accomplished musicians. Among the members joining Top and Pesacov were Garrett Ray, Jimmy Vincent and Matt Popieluch of Pesacov's other band, Foreign Born; Latin American pop star Erica Garcia; Orpheo McCord (former drummer for The Fall), Michael Tapper (formerly of We Are Scientists), and several others.

In late 2009, the band was chosen as of one Beyond Race Magazine's 50 Emerging Artists, resulting in a spot in the publication's No. 11 issue, as well as an exclusive Q&A for the magazine's site.

Fool’s Gold live shows have earned them invitations to The Hollywood Bowl, SummerStage, and the Black Sessions in Paris. Fool’s Gold have played events such as Glastonbury, Reading, Leeds, Oya, Austin City Limits Music Festival and London Calling Fest in Amsterdam. In 2011, they toured in England with The Red Hot Chili Peppers.

=== Fool's Gold debut album ===
The songs for the band's debut album Fool's Gold were mostly recorded live over a two-day session at the Sunset Lodge recording studio in Los Angeles in 2008; tracks were later completed in various apartment living rooms in the early parts of 2009. Top and Pesacov collaborated on the music, written over a three-year span. The lyrics of the album are almost entirely in Hebrew.

The album was released on September 29, 2009 through Los Angeles label IAMSOUND Records on both 12" vinyl and compact disc formats; it was subsequently released worldwide on January 25, 2010.

=== Leave No Trace redefines the band ===
After many tours following the release of their self-titled debut, the once sizable collective organically evolved into a five-member band: vocalist/bassist Luke Top, guitarist Lewis Pesacov, drummer Garrett Ray, multi-instrumentalist Brad Caulkins, and percussionist Salvador Placencia. This line-up redefined their sound for their sophomore LP, Leave No Trace, much of which was written in Wonder Valley, California (an artist/musician collective in the Mojave Desert). It was recorded at infrasonic studios in Alhambra in East Los Angeles, according to Pesacov, who also produced the album.

A notable distinction in Leave No Trace is that it is sung predominantly in English. This was an intuitive choice, much in the way the debut album leaned towards Hebrew. “Singing in Hebrew on the first record allowed me to find my voice; it helped me to come out of my shell and push myself into letting go, both as a performer and songwriter,” says singer Luke Top. “As the words and themes for this record started to take shape, I knew I had to express them in English, my first language. Being that this is a far more personal and nuanced collection of songs, it was important to me that my ideas were expressed as clearly as possible, both to myself and to the listener.”

== Discography ==
=== Albums ===
- Fool's Gold (IAMSOUND Records, 2009)
- Leave No Trace (IAMSOUND Records, 2011)
- Flying Lessons (Org Music, 2015)

=== Singles ===
- "Surprise Hotel", Limited Edition 7" (IAMSOUND Records, 2009)
- "Nadine", Limited Edition 7" (IAMSOUND Records, 2010)
