= Pocahaunted =

American psychedelic music project

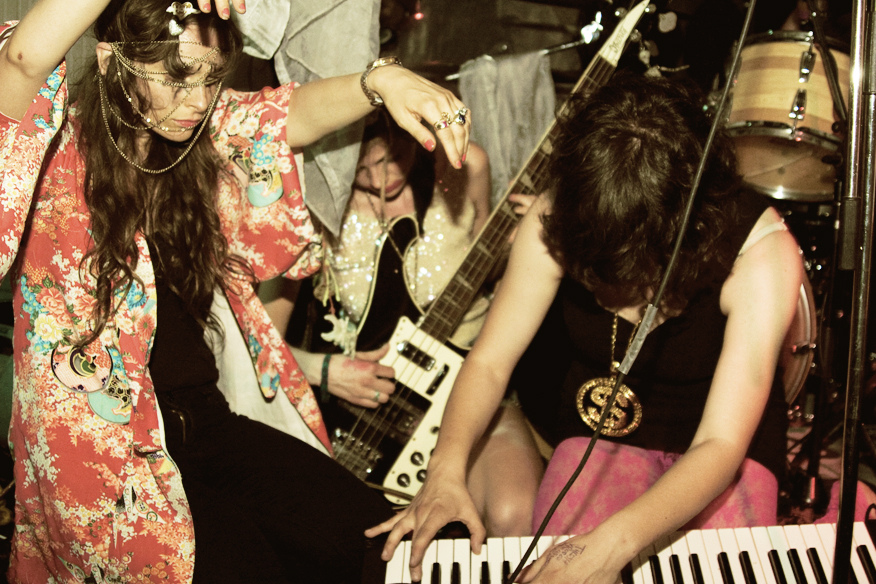
- Pocahaunted in 2010

Background information
- Origin: Los Angeles, California
- Genres: Psychedelia
- Years active: 2006–2010
- Labels: Not Not Fun; Woodsist; Troubleman Unlimited; Blackest Rainbow; Night People; Ecstatic Peace!
- Past members: Amanda Brown; Diva Dompe; Leyna Tilbor; Britt Brown; Ged Gengras; Bethany Cosentino; Cameron Stallones; Bobb Bruno

Pocahaunted (often shortened by the band to P-haunt) was a psychedelic music project based in Los Angeles, California founded in 2005 and disbanded in 2010 by Amanda Brown and Bethany Cosentino.

== History ==
Amanda Brown founded Not Not Fun Records in 2005; she and friend Bethany Cosentino formed the duo Pocahaunted the following year after Brown had a dream about it. The group released nine albums, including collaborations with Robedoor, Cosentino's future Best Coast bandmate Bobb Bruno and Cameron Stallones aka Sun Araw. They also released numerous singles, EP's and cassette releases on Not Not Fun as well as on other labels including Troubleman Unlimited Records, Ecstatic Peace! and the Swedish imprint Release The Bats, generally preferring the vinyl and cassette formats over compact disc and often featuring handmade/hand-painted artwork. Cosentino left the group in 2010 to attend college in New York City, founding the duo Best Coast with Bobb Bruno while there. This necessitated a lineup overhaul, including the addition of Brown's husband Britt on guitar, as well as Diva Dompe (Blackblack), Leyna Noel Tilbor (Psychic Reality), and M. Geddes Gengras. The group disbanded in August 2010.

== Discography ==
=== Albums ===
- Moccasinging – Not Not Fun (2006)
- A Tear for Every Grain of Sand – Fuck It Tapes (2007)
- Pocahaunted – Ruralfaune [France] (2007)
- Split w/ Robedoor – Digitalis Recordings (2007)
- Rough Magic – Blackest Rainbow (2007)
- Chains – Teenage Teardrops (2008)
- Peyote Road – Woodist (2008)
- Beast That You Are – Night People (2008)
- Island Diamonds – Arbor Infinity (LP, 2008) / Not Not Fun (CD w/ 2 bonus tracks, 2008)
- Mirror Mics – Weird Forest (2008)
- Live from the New Age – Not Not Fun (2009)
- Passage – Troubleman Unlimited (2009)
- Make It Real – Not Not Fun (LP/CD/cassette) (2010)

=== EPs and singles ===
- What the Spirit Tells Me – Buried Valley (2006)
- Split w/ Mythical Beast – Not Not Fun (2007)
- Emerald Snake On Ruby Velvet – Not Not Fun (2007)
- Water-Born – Not Not Fun (2007)
- Native Seduction – Arbor (2007)
- Split w/ Charalambides – Not Not Fun (2008)
- Bearskin Rug – Not Not Fun (2008)
- Split w/ Orphan Fairytale – Release the Bats [Sweden] (2008)
- Gold Miner's Daughters – Excite Bike Tapes (2009)
- Threshold – Not Not Fun (2010)
