= Always Tomorrow (album) =

Studio album by Best Coast
- Released: February 21, 2020
- Length: 39:28
- Label: Concord
- Producer: Carlos de la Garza

Best Coast chronology
California Nights (2015)	Always Tomorrow (2020)

Singles from Always Tomorrow
- 1. "For the First Time" Released: November 5, 2019; 2. "Everything Has Changed" Released: January 17, 2020; 3. "Different Light" Released: February 5, 2020

Professional ratings
Review scores
Source	Rating
AllMusic	2.5/5 stars
Consequence of Sound	B+
Pitchfork	6.5/10
Rolling Stone	2.5/5 stars

Always Tomorrow is the fourth studio album by American rock duo Best Coast. It was released through Concord Music on February 21, 2020. It is the band's first studio album in five years. The singles "For the First Time", "Everything Has Changed" and "Different Light" preceded the album's release. The band began a tour in February 2020 in support of the album.

== Background ==
Bethany Cosentino said that after finishing the California Nights album and touring commitments, she felt "creatively paralyzed. I couldn't write music. There was so much bubbling inside of me, so many things happening, so much to process, but I couldn't get any of it out", and believed "nothing was ever going to change". She later forced herself to write, coming up with the song "Everything Has Changed", and has called the album "the story of where I was and where I am now, as well as the struggles I am still learning to identify and figure out. [...] This album is about leaving the darkness for the light, but still understanding that nothing is ever going to be perfect." Cosentino also got sober and began a "recovery and self-care process", which is reflected in much of the lyrics of the album.

== Critical reception ==
Tim Sendra of AllMusic commented on the "numbing sameness of the lyrical content", finding that Cosentino retreads the same subject matter—the "changes she's been through"—in each song, and that there are only hints of a "positive direction" or a change to her "slacker drawl vocal style she uses to deliver each self-obsessed observation". Conversely, Arielle Gordon of Pitchfork wrote that the album "showcases Cosentino's expanding range as a vocalist and songwriter" and that it is Cosentino's "musicianship and knack for melody that prevents these songs from turning to fluff".

== Track listing ==
Always Tomorrow track listing
No.	Title	Writer(s)	Length
1.	"Different Light"	Bethany Cosentino	3:12
2.	"Everything Has Changed"	Costentino	3:33
3.	"For the First Time"	Cosentino	3:38
4.	"Graceless Kids"	Bobb Bruno; Cosentino	3:09
5.	"Wreckage"	Bruno; Cosentino	3:24
6.	"Rollercoaster"	Cosentino	3:50
7.	"Master of My Own Mind"	Cosentino	3:16
8.	"True"	Cosentino	3:19
9.	"Seeing Red"	Cosentino	3:50
10.	"Make It Last"	Bruno; Cosentino; Carlos de la Garza	3:47
11.	"Used to Be"	Bruno; Cosentino	4:30
Total length:			39:28

== Personnel ==
Best Coast

- Bobb Bruno – bass guitar, guitar, keyboards
- Bethany Cosentino – vocals, guitar, keyboards (all tracks); bass guitar (tracks 1, 2, 4–11), percussion (3), art direction

Additional contributors

- Carlos de la Garza – production, mixing, engineering, instrumentation
- Justin Meldal-Johnsen – additional production, instrumentation
- Dave Cooley – mastering
- Andrew Mandell – engineering
- Devin O'Brien – engineering
- Harriet Tam – engineering
- Kevin Martin – engineering
- Sean Cook – engineering
- Sergio Chavez – engineering
- Mac Cregan – engineering assistance
- Kiel Feher – drums
- Zac Rae – keyboards
- Tommy Steele – design
- Kevin Hayes – photography

== Charts ==
Chart performance for Always Tomorrow
Chart (2020)	Peak position
US Top Album Sales (Billboard)	37
US Indie Store Album Sales (Billboard)	15
