= Best Coast =

American surf pop band

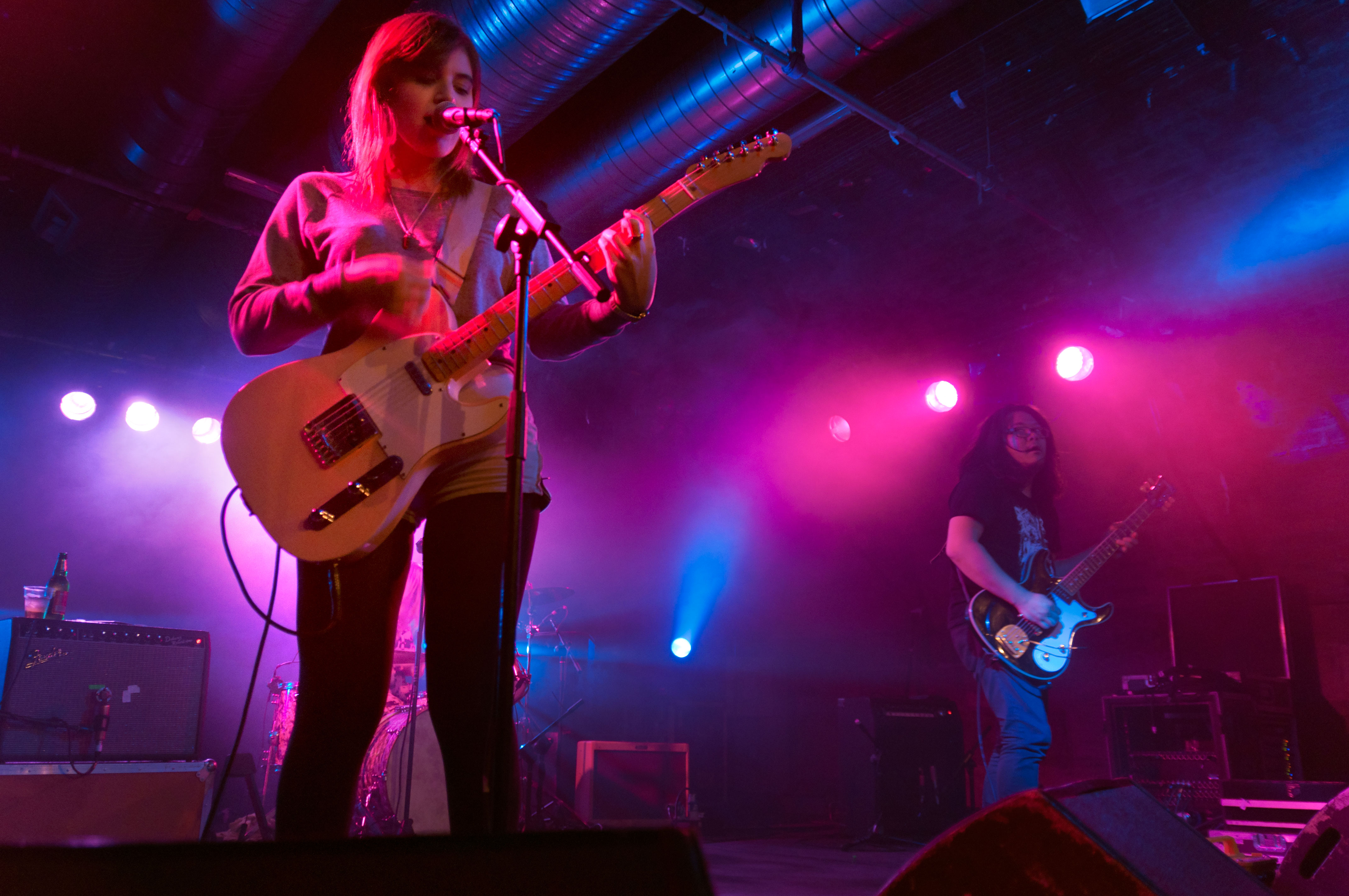
- Best Coast performing in 2011

Background information
- Origin: Los Angeles, US
- Genres: Indie pop; surf; indie rock; alternative rock; power pop
- Years active: 2009–2023 (hiatus)
- Labels: Jewel City; Mexican Summer; Wichita; Post Present Medium; Group Tightener; Art Fag Recordings; Black Iris; Blackest Rainbow; Kobalt; Harvest
- Past members: Bethany Cosentino; Bobb Bruno
- Website: bestcoast.net

Best Coast is an American rock duo formed in Los Angeles, California in 2009, currently on hiatus. The band consists of songwriter, guitarist and vocalist Bethany Cosentino and guitarist and multi-instrumentalist Bobb Bruno. Cosentino, a former child actress, began writing music as a teenager and was formerly a member of the experimentalist drone group Pocahaunted. After a brief stint at college in New York City, Cosentino returned to the West Coast and began recording lo-fi demos with Bruno, whom she met in the Los Angeles music scene.

After a string of 7-inch and cassette-only singles, the band signed to Mexican Summer, who issued the band's debut, Crazy for You, in 2010. It became an unexpected commercial success following Internet buzz surrounding the duo. Lewis Pesacov of Fool's Gold and Foreign Born produced, engineered and mixed the album. Best Coast added a touring drummer, Ali Koehler of Vivian Girls, and spent much of 2011 on the road for festival appearances and tour dates. Best Coast's sophomore effort, The Only Place, was released in 2012 and featured a cleaner sound than their previous releases. In 2013, the duo released an EP, Fade Away, and their third studio album, California Nights, was released in May 2015. More recently, Best Coast released their fourth studio album, Always Tomorrow, in February 2020.

In 2023, Cosentino put the band on hiatus to explore a solo career, releasing her debut album, Natural Disaster, that same year. Bruno became the bass guitarist for the shoegaze band Nothing and contributed to their fifth album, A Short History of Decay (2026).

== History ==
=== Formation and early releases (2009) ===
Best Coast was formed in 2009 by Bethany Cosentino (born November 3, 1986) and Bobb Bruno (born May 10, 1973) in Los Angeles, California. Cosentino had been around the Los Angeles music scene from a young age, and had been involved in talent competitions, musicals, audition tapes, and commercials for Little Caesars. She began writing music at age 15, inspired by Joni Mitchell, Joan Baez and Bob Dylan, as well as Weezer and Blink-182. Cosentino began uploading her music to MySpace under the name "Bethany Sharayah". She was approached and offered record deals from major labels in her teens, but resisted as they desired to mold her into a "pop princess" type. In the mid-2000s, she met Amanda Brown at the downtown LA DIY venue the Smell. Brown attempted to act as a "big sister" to Cosentino, who seemed "sort of depressed, missing music, [and] feeling a bit weird about some of her friends." The two began playing together in the experimentalist, drone group Pocahaunted. Pocahaunted's music had no traditional lyrics, and instead contained wordless vocalizations from Cosentino and Brown. The collaboration began in 2006 and released several cassette-only recordings on local label Not Not Fun. The recordings were supervised and produced by Bobb Bruno, a multi-instrumentalist stalwart in the city's music scene.

Pocahaunted achieved minor success (at one point opening for Sonic Youth), but Cosentino left the project to pursue creative writing at the Eugene Lang College The New School for Liberal Arts in New York City. Studying journalism and creative nonfiction, she read Joan Didion, David Foster Wallace and other authors she enjoyed and she interned at The Fader, where she penned a fashion column. Cosentino lived in Brooklyn and all but abandoned her musical pursuits, and soon fell into a mundane routine and seasonal depression in her second semester, feeling miserable. Having grown up on the very sunny and warm West Coast, she found the city "stressful, congested and cold," and based much of her nonfiction on California. Although she felt she would be letting her family and friends down by dropping out, she phoned her mother to come help her gather her belongings and return to Los Angeles over the course of a weekend in March/April 2009. Returning to La Crescenta, she lived with her mother and began work as a part-time sales associate for Lush, but felt immediately inspired to write new music, using her acoustic guitar to cope with anxiety. She informed Bruno, and the two began laying down demos in his home studio. The band's first release, "Sun Was High (So Was I)", was released by Art Fag and was the first of a string of 7-inch singles.

The band's second 7-inch single, "When I'm with You", was financed by Black Iris, which functioned as both a music and film production agency. Lewis Pesacov oversaw the production, engineering and mixing of "This is Real" & "When I'm With You." After their first experience recording with live drums and "real" production, they made a conscious effort to stray away from their original, more lo-fi and hazy sound. A collection of 7-inch singles on Art Fag and Black Iris alerted Adam Shore, owner of buzz-generating website The Daily Swarm, who became the group's manager. Jeffery Kaye, label manager of Mexican Summer, discovered the band's music online. These releases included a cassette tape release, Where the Boys Are, on the U.K. label Blackest Rainbow; a split 7-inch, "Up All Night", on Atelier Ciseaux; and an EP, Make You Mine, on Group Tightener. Margaret Reges writes that Best Coast had "become something of a sensation by the time 2009 came to a close"; the band enjoyed a bit of attention from the media (notably from Nylon), and Make You Mine made its way onto a few year-end lists. The band embarked on its first U.S. tour early the following year, sharing the stage with the Vivian Girls.

=== Crazy for You and The Only Place (2010–2012) ===
The duo recorded their debut album, Crazy for You, for Black Iris at Mexican Radio Studios in Echo Park, California from January to April 2010. Lewis Pesacov of Fool's Gold and Foreign Born produced, engineered and mixed the album. "Boyfriend" was released as the lead single from the album on June 29, 2010. Crazy for You became a mainstream success upon its July 2010 release as a result of Internet buzz. It entered the Billboard 200 at number 36 with 10,000 units sold and debuted at No. 10 on Digital Albums. The album's success led to maximum exposure: "the blogosphere was suddenly abuzz with talk about her album, her tweets, her personal life, her daily habits and even one of her cats." Alongside the quick success came an intense level of scrutiny, Internet haters and venom from selected critics, some of whom viewed Cosentino's material as anti-feminist. Crazy for You and its sound, "simple and pungent songs [...] toying with 1950s and '60s melodic structures," had become something of a touchstone for Best Coast and adopted by several other bands. Cosentino hid her vocals behind layers of reverb and distortion, which was an extension of her onstage anxiety.

The band continued to gain popularity over the course of 2010 and 2011, due in part to touring and festival appearances. Ali Koehler of Vivian Girls became the band's interim touring drummer, but was ousted from the group at the end of 2011. During this period, much of the band's press consisted of details on Cosentino's relationship with Wavves' Nathan Williams. The two collaborated and toured together throughout 2011 in a joint effort dubbed the Summer Is Forever tour. The extensive travel schedule subsequently inspired the lyrical content of the band's sophomore effort, The Only Place (2012). Cosentino felt that her life had dramatically changed in the two years following its release, having never spent so much time away from home. The duo had a desire to create a record that "nobody was going to call lo-fi," and Bruno reached out to his former boss, producer/composer Jon Brion, known for his work on Kanye West's Late Registration (2005).

The Only Place, released in May 2012, was recorded at Capitol Records Studio B in Los Angeles, California. While previous recording sessions were marked by goofing off and studying, the duo took their sophomore effort more seriously and strove to create a different sound. The decision to work with producer Jon Brion was an effort to bring polish to the mixes. Brion, who admired Crazy for You and its production, planned to stay out of the way during sessions, hoping primarily to bring out Cosentino's vocals and emphasize the low-end of the mixes. Brion noted that the duo "were curious to not use the reverb thing as a crutch." Brion equipped the duo with vintage analog gear, and attempted to make use of the studio's Les Paul-designed reverb chambers. Brion noted that Cosentino and Bruno "have a secret language," and he merely suggested a few different guitars.

=== Fade Away, California Nights, Always Tomorrow, and hiatus (2013–2023) ===
Best Coast's next release, an EP entitled Fade Away, was released on October 22, 2013, on singer Bethany Cosentino's new label, Jewel City. In October 2013, the band produced a charity t-shirt for the Yellow Bird Project to raise money and awareness for the L.A. Animal Rescue. The shirt was launched at their Animal Rescue benefit concert, which took place at The Fonda Theatre on October 21, 2013. The duo toured with the Pixies in early 2014.

The duo released their third studio album, California Nights, on May 5, 2015. It was recorded, like Fade Away, with Wally Gagel at his Wax Ltd studio. The album was completed in April 2014. The album was initially reported to be produced by Butch Walker. On March 10, 2015, the duo shared a lyric video for "Heaven Sent", a cut off the LP.

In early 2016, the band embarked with Wavves on another extensive concert tour, billed as Summer Is Forever II and including the California indie rock band Cherry Glazerr.

On September 11, 2017, Best Coast began touring as support on Paramore's tour for their new release After Laughter. In October 2017, the band headlined the first VintageVibe Festival with groups such as Black Joe Lewis & the Honeybears and Nick Waterhouse in Palm Springs, California.

In June 2018, Best Coast released their first album targeted to children called Best Kids. Besides covers like "Twinkle, Twinkle, Little Star", it also contains originals such as the lead single "Cats & Dogs".

In May 2019, Best Coast was announced as the house band on aftershow parody TV series What Just Happened??! with Fred Savage.

On January 17, 2020, Best Coast released a new single, "Everything Has Changed". On the same day, they announced in an Instagram post the release of their fourth album, Always Tomorrow, which was released on February 21, 2020, via Concord Records.

In May 2023, Cosentino decided to indefinitely put the project on hiatus as she explored a solo career. In a press statement regarding the decision, she wrote:

My identity as a human being, and as an artist, has been so wrapped up in Best Coast for over a decade. The decision to pause the project indefinitely, and explore a new side of myself, was a very difficult one to make—but it felt necessary for me. Life is too short to not give yourself what you feel you need and want. I am excited about being just Bethany Cosentino for a while and figuring out who I am outside of the "Bethany from Best Coast" box I've lived in for such a long time.

Cosentino's debut solo album, Natural Disaster, was released on July 28, 2023, via Concord Records.

== Musical style and influences ==
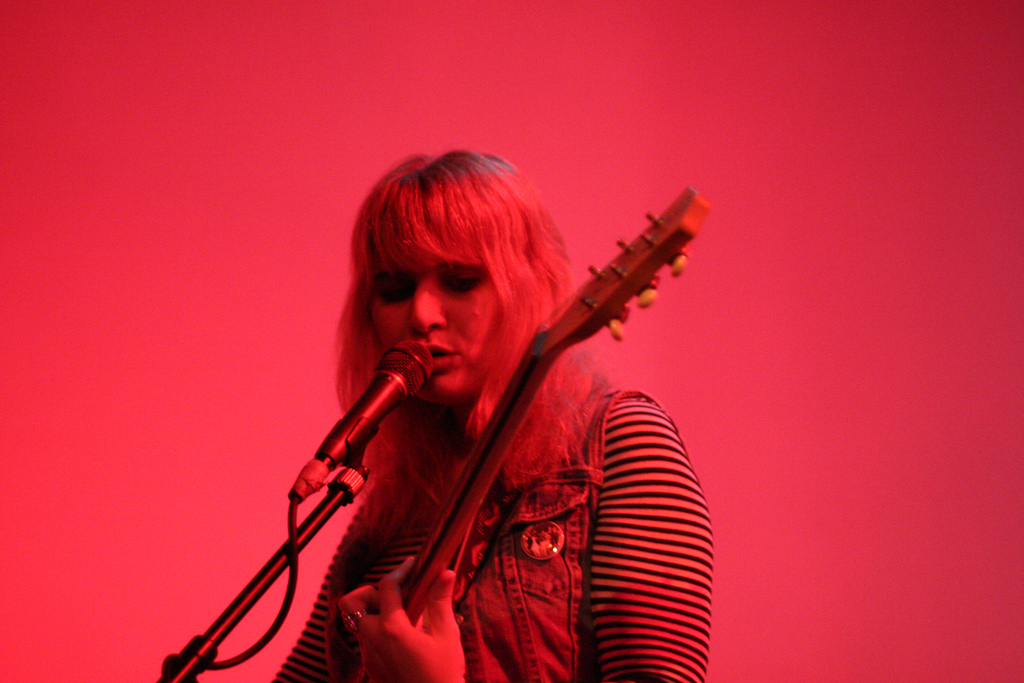
Bethany Cosentino created the band from a love of 1950s and 60s surf rock and girl groups.

Best Coast was originally loosely inspired by The Beatles and The Beach Boys, as well as straightforward 1950s/1960s pop music. The band's music was described by The Guardian as "like a lo-fi 60s garage rock and surfing band fronted by a girl group singer". "Drawing inspiration from '60s surf rock and girl groups, Best Coast's noisy lo-fi sound gave a nod to contemporaneous acts like Hot Lava, the Vivian Girls, and Brilliant Colors," wrote Margaret Reges of Allmusic. Weezer and Blink-182 partially inspired Cosentino's songwriting, and Best Coast have covered the Blink-182 song "Dammit" in concert. Pitchfork Media writes that "Best Coast carry enough influence from 90s California pop punk that they would've been right at home on a late-90s Warped Tour stage." Some genres they have been tagged as includes indie pop, surf/surf pop, indie rock, alternative rock, power pop, noise pop, garage rock and jangle pop.

The band's second album, The Only Place, was developed with a variety of influences: traditional country music (such as Loretta Lynn, Dusty Springfield and Patsy Cline), Eagles, Fleetwood Mac and Drake's Take Care. Fade Away, the band's 2013 EP, was primarily inspired by Mazzy Star, Patsy Cline and My Bloody Valentine. For their third album California Nights, Cosentino cited Gwen Stefani, Sugar Ray and The Go-Go's as influences.

== Band members ==
- Bethany Cosentino – lead vocals, rhythm guitar, piano (2009–2023)
- Bobb Bruno – lead guitar, bass guitar, drums (2009–2023)

Former touring musicians

- Ali Koehler – drums, backing vocals (2010–2011)
- Rafe Mandel – drums (2012)
- Brady Miller – drums (2012–2016)
- Brett Mielke – bass guitar, backing vocals (2012–2022)
- Joseph Bautista – rhythm guitar, keyboards (2015–2022)
- Dylan Wood – drums (2017–2019)
- Dylan Fujioka – drums (2019–2022)
- Brian Hill – drums (2022)

== Discography ==
- Crazy for You (2010)
- The Only Place (2012)
- California Nights (2015)
- Always Tomorrow (2020)
