= Boyfriend (fashion) =

Style of women's clothing

In fashion design, "boyfriend" is a style of women's clothing that draws heavily from corresponding men's garments. Boyfriend-style clothes are designed to be looser or boxier and tend to be oversized – giving the appearance that one is wearing a "boyfriend's clothing". The style can be traced back to the 1960s, when Marilyn Monroe wore her boyfriend's loosely-fitting jeans, which contrasted her feminine looks with a masculine aesthetic. Modern boyfriend-style clothes are often designed to look unisex and fit most women. As the trend continues to grow, many brands such as Gap, Forever 21, H&M, and Urban Outfitters, have created boyfriend or men's-inspired fashion targeted at female consumers.

== Background of women in menswear ==
In the 19th century, women's fashion within Western society typically consisted of dresses, skirts, and corsets. Amelia Bloomer, a women's rights activist in the 1850s, was one of the first to change mainstream womenswear when she introduced the bloomer. In the 1930s, movie stars such as Katharine Hepburn and Marlene Dietrich sometimes wore menswear-style fashion. During World War II, masculine attire became more acceptable as womenswear, during which time many women were drafted into jobs requiring physical labour. After the end of the war, many women returned to more feminine forms of dressing. It was not until the 1960s and early 1970s that menswear-inspired fashion was no longer considered a rebellious political statement.
