= Fool's Gold (Fool's Gold album) =

Studio album by Fool's Gold
- Released: September 29, 2009
- Recorded: 2008 at Sunset Lodge Recording Studio, Los Angeles, California
- Genre: World, Tropical, Indie
- Length: 43:05
- Label: IAMSOUND Records

Fool's Gold chronology
Fool's Gold (2009)	Leave No Trace (2011)

Professional ratings
Review scores
Source	Rating
BBC	(favorable)
Boston Phoenix	3.5/4 stars
Drowned in Sound	7/10 stars
Filter	8/10 stars
The Guardian	4/5 stars
NME	6/10 stars
Pitchfork Media	7.6/10
Prefix Magazine	7.5/10
The Times	4/5 stars
Uncut	4/4 stars
XLR8R	(favorable)

Fool's Gold is the first studio album by the American indie band Fool's Gold. It was released on September 29, 2009, by IAMSOUND Records in the United States, and on January 25, 2010, in the United Kingdom.

== Track listing ==
1. "Surprise Hotel" – 6:48
2. "Nadine" – 5:50
3. "Ha Dvash" – 5:04
4. "The World is All There Is" – 4:42
5. "Poseidon" – 6:38
6. "Yam Lo Moshech" – 4:39
7. "Night Dancing" – 4:48
8. "Momentary Shelter" – 4:39
