= Foreign Born =

- Origin: San Francisco, California, U.S.
- Genres: Folk rock
- Years active: 2003–2011
- Labels: StarTime International Records, Secretly Canadian, Dim Mak Records
- Members: Lewis Pesacov; Ariel Rechtshaid; Matt Popieluch; Garrett Ray

Foreign Born was an American folk rock band, formed in San Francisco in 2003.

The band self-released its first 12" single ("We Had Pleasure" b/w "Escape"), and then its first EP In the Remote Woods through StarTime International Records. While touring the US and UK with Rogue Wave, Jason Collett, Cold War Kids, Giant Drag and We Are Scientists, Foreign Born recorded its first full-length album, On the Wing Now, in fall and winter 2005, and self-released 500 or so copies that were sold on the tours, and officially released the album with Dim Mak on August 21, 2007. The band appeared in Spin magazine in October 2007. Another album, Person to Person, was released on June 23, 2009, by the Secretly Canadian record label. In August 2011, the band had stopped working.

== Television ==
The band played in the nightclub scene during the pilot episode of Chuck as well as the bar scene of the pilot episode of Reaper.
