= Bethany Cosentino =

American singer-songwriter (born 1986)

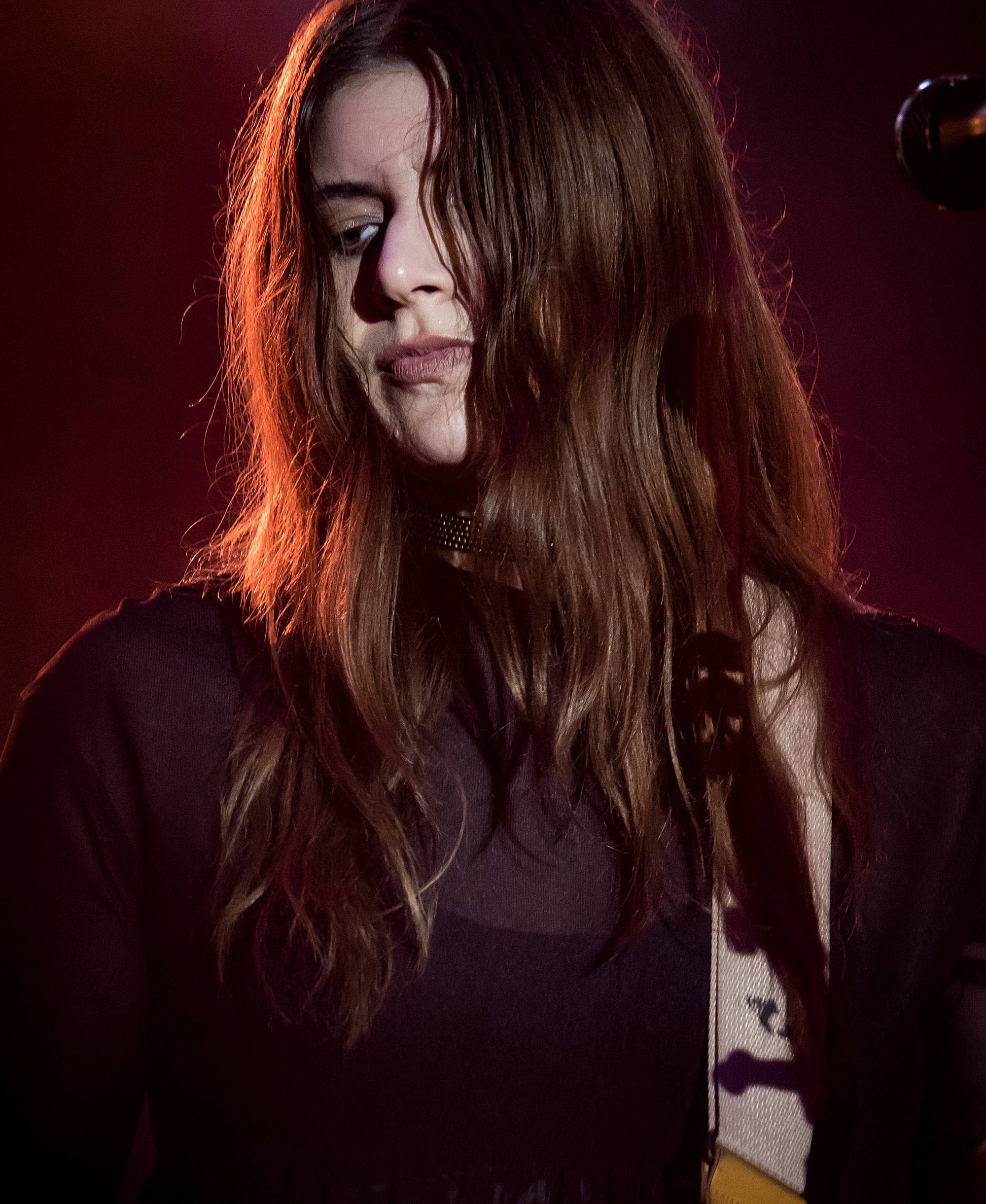
- Cosentino in 2016

Background information
- Born: Bethany Sharayah Cosentino; November 3, 1986 (age 39); Los Angeles, California
- Occupation: Musician
- Instrument: Vocals
- Label: Concord
- Member of: Best Coast
- Formerly of: Pocahaunted
- Website: bethanycosentino.com

Bethany Sharayah Cosentino (born November 3, 1986, in Los Angeles) is an American singer and songwriter. She is best known as one half of the indie rock duo Best Coast alongside Bobb Bruno. Cosentino also cofounded the hypnagogic pop band Pocahaunted in 2006, before leaving in 2010. She released her solo debut album, Natural Disaster, in 2023.

== Biography ==
=== Early life and Pocahaunted ===
Bethany Sharayah Cosentino was born on November 3, 1986, in Los Angeles, California. Her middle name was taken from the song of the same name by Amy Grant. She is of half-Italian descent. Her father was a musician who toured with bands including War and Ambrosia, and her mother was an actor in commercials and a fashion designer. Her father was also the worship leader at their church, and Cosentino started singing with the church's choir. Seeing her mother's commercial work inspired her to do the same as a child actor.

When asked about what music spoke to her in her youth, Cosentino mentioned Linda Ronstadt, Rilo Kiley, Sheryl Crow, Stevie Nicks, Joni Mitchell, Gwen Stefani, and No Doubt. At seventeen, she started posting original noise music to MySpace under the name Bethany Sharayah. That music got significant attention online, with major record labels trying to sign her which she rejected. She left high school early after passing the California High School Proficiency Exam and attended a community college.

In 2006, Cosentino and Amanda Brown cofounded Pocahaunted, a hypnagogic pop duo, in Los Angeles. The two issued over 25 releases in three years, and supported Sonic Youth for a concert in Berkeley, California, in 2007. In 2010, Cosentino left Pocahaunted and moved to New York to study creative writing at The New School. While in New York, she worked an internship for the music publication The Fader, writing about fashion. Her fashion writing led to her sitting front row at Helmut Lang's Spring 2012 New York Fashion Week show.

=== Solo music ===
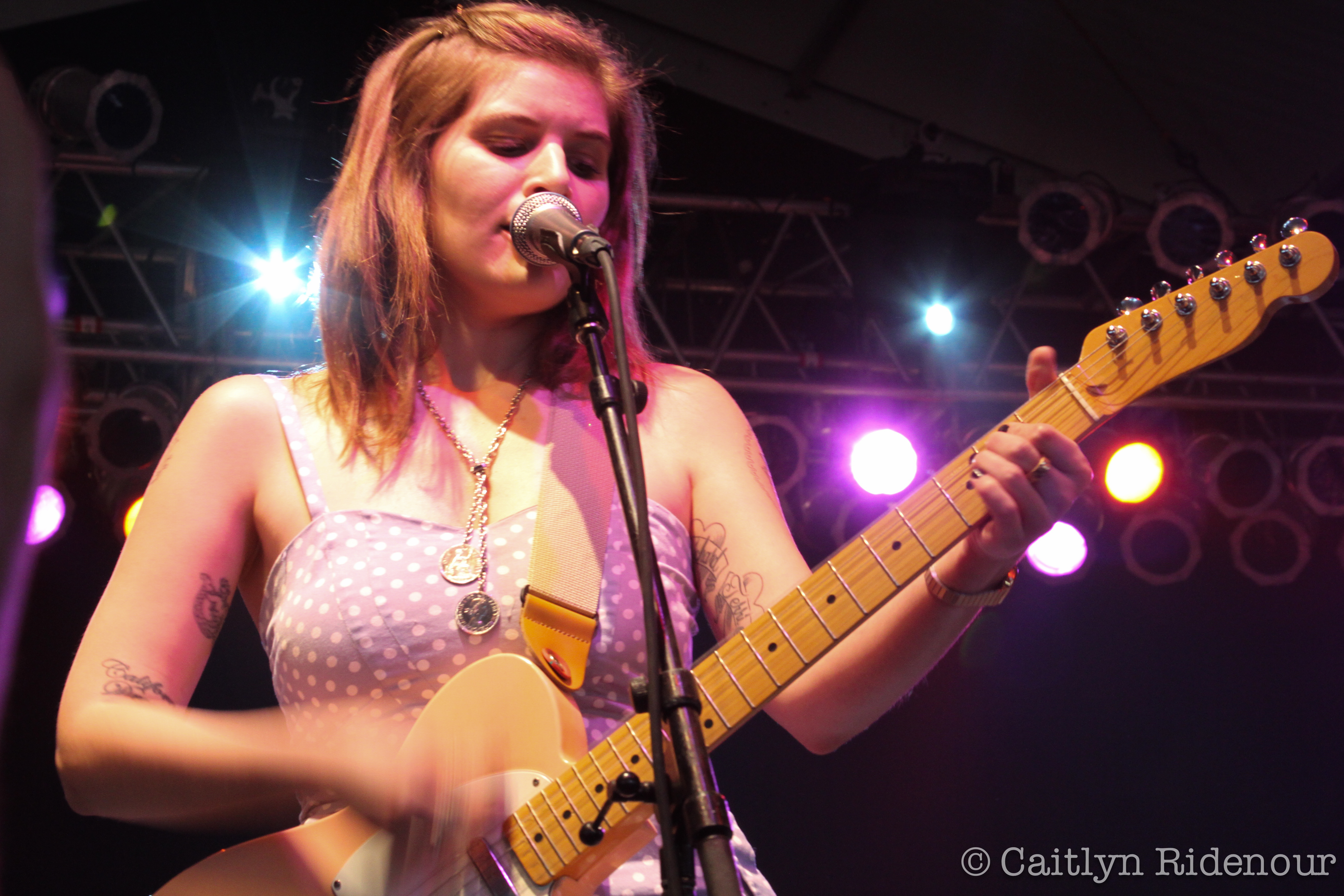
Cosentino performing at Bonnaroo Festival in 2011.

On October 7, 2014, Weezer released their ninth studio album, Everything Will Be Alright in the End. Cosentino featured on the album in a duet with Weezer frontman Rivers Cuomo on the song "Go Away". On July 24, 2015, the band released a music video for "Go Away", directed by Brendan Walter and Greg Yagolnitzer, in which Cuomo plays a man trying to win back the affection of his ex-girlfriend played by Cosentino.

On May 14, 2018, Cosentino released a single, "Jerry (Maybe We Should Get Married)", which was a collaboration with songwriter Nick Lutsko and parody Twitter account @Seinfeld2000. The song, released by the company Super Deluxe, features Cosentino singing from the perspective of Seinfeld character Elaine Benes.

On February 11, 2021, Spotify launched the show Bandsplain with theme music composed by Cosentino and Jennifer Clavin of Bleached. On August 20, Third Eye Blind released "Again", a single from their album Our Bande Apart, which featured Cosentino.

On July 26, 2022, Cosentino sang "The Star-Spangled Banner" at Dodger Stadium to open a game between the Los Angeles Dodgers and the Washington Nationals.

On May 3, 2023, the same day as announcing Best Coast's hiatus, Cosentino announced her debut solo album, Natural Disaster. The album was primarily produced by Butch Walker and recorded in his Nashville studio; Walker was chosen for his background in alternative country and Americana. The album was released by Concord Records on July 28, 2023. Turning away from Best Coast's sound, Cosentino instead made a pop rock, folk rock, and Americana record influenced by Bonnie Raitt, Sheryl Crow, and Jewel. The album received a generally favorable response from critics.

=== Other ventures ===
On March 1, 2012, Cosentino announced her clothing line with Urban Outfitters, with the clothes going on sale in May. She was the second musician to collaborate with the company, after Kim Gordon launched her clothing line in 2009. Designed for the company's Urban Renewal vintage clothing brand, Cosentino's inspirations for the designs included the movies Clueless and The Craft, Stevie Nicks's "infamous witchy style", and her childhood in the San Fernando Valley, describing it overall as "if Stevie Nicks and Cher from Clueless had a baby and they took her to a séance."

On November 3, 2017, Billboard published an op-ed written by Cosentino about sexual assault in the entertainment industry, just a month after film producer Harvey Weinstein was accused of sexual assault in an article in the New York Times, launching the MeToo movement of sex crime and sexual harassment victims publicizing their experiences. In the piece, Cosentino called Weinstein "The Man With Power Who Abuses It", and discussed how men like that are "in colleges, at Halloween parties, at car washes, in grocery stores — they're everywhere." She described her own experiences with sexual assault, both from a family member as a child and from a man she employed as an adult. She concluded the piece by saying "If 2016 was the year we elected a grabber-in-chief" – a reference to the allegations against then-President of the United States Donald Trump – "consider 2017 the year of male consequence." The piece also made reference to allegations against fellow indie rock musician Matt Mondanile. Cosentino had previously appeared on The Daily Show in 2016 to discuss sexual assault in the music industry after Dirty Projectors' Amber Coffman and other women publicly accused publicist Heathcliff Berru of sexual misconduct, which Cosentino had responded to supportively.

On March 25, 2020, Cosentino debuted her weekly radio show Bethline, livestreamed on Best Coast's YouTube channel. The first episode's featured guest was Mannequin Pussy's Marisa Dabice. Subsequent guests of the show included Sleigh Bells's Alexis Krauss, Paramore's Hayley Williams, Vanessa Carlton, Soccer Mommy, and Fred Savage. As of May 2020, the show was on hiatus.

=== Personal life ===
Cosentino started dating Nathan Williams, the founder and lead vocalist of Wavves, when both were 17 years old. The two first met at a party in San Diego. They later broke up, leading to Cosentino's decision to get sober in 2017.

In May 2022, Cosentino was one of over 150 artists that signed an open letter in The New York Times condemning the planned overturn of Roe v. Wade by the United States Supreme Court.

On June 23, 2023, Cosentino's boyfriend proposed to her in a parking lot of the Americana at Brand shopping mall in Glendale, California. On July 10, 2024, Cosentino announced she was pregnant with her first child. She married her husband on October 19 at her baby shower. Their daughter, Luna Wren Richter, was born December 14.

As of 2023, Cosentino lives in Glendale in a house built in the 1930s.

Cosentino had an orange Maine Coon cat named Snacks whom she adopted from her neighbors. Snacks appeared on the covers of Best Coast's debut album Crazy for You and Wavves's King of the Beach, featured in a PETA advertisement with Cosentino, and had a dedicated Twitter account. He was referred to as both the band's "official mascot" and "third member". Snacks died on February 9, 2022, at 14. Cosentino also had another cat, a domestic shorthair named Chloe.

Cosentino got her first tattoo, the words "all you need is love" and a small heart on her wrist, at 16. Other tattoos include the words "Trust no one" on one finger, and "Let it go" on another on the opposite hand.

== Discography ==
=== Albums ===
- Natural Disaster (Concord, 2023)

=== Singles ===
Year	Release	Album
2018	"Jerry (Maybe We Should Get Married)"	Non-album single
2023	"It's Fine"	Natural Disaster
2023	"Easy"	Natural Disaster
2023	"For a Moment"	Natural Disaster
2023	"Natural Disaster"	Natural Disaster

=== Guest appearances ===
Year	Artist	Release	Album
2010	Kid Cudi	"All Summer"	Non-album single
2011	The Go! Team	"Buy Nothing Day"	Rolling Blackouts
2011	New Found Glory	"Caught in the Act"	Radiosurgery
2014	Weezer	"Go Away"	Everything Will Be Alright in the End
2015	Jeff the Brotherhood	"In My Dreams"	Wasted on the Dream
2021	Third Eye Blind	"Again"	Our Bande Apart
