= No Kings (album) =

Studio album by Doomtree
- Released: November 22, 2011
- Genre: Hip-hop
- Length: 46:40
- Label: Doomtree Records
- Producers: Cecil Otter; Lazerbeak; P.O.S; Paper Tiger

Doomtree chronology
FH:XV (False Hopes 15) (2009)	No Kings (2011)	All Hands (2015)

Singles from No Kings
- 1. "Bangarang" Released: May 28, 2012

Professional ratings
Aggregate scores
Source	Rating
Metacritic	80/100
Review scores
Source	Rating
AllMusic	3/5 stars
The A.V. Club	A−
Consequence of Sound	B
The Current	favorable
Pitchfork	7.9/10
PopMatters	7/10 stars

No Kings is the second official studio album by Minneapolis hip-hop collective Doomtree. It was released by Doomtree Records on November 22, 2011. "Bangarang" was released as a single from the album.

== Critical reception ==
At Metacritic, which assigns a weighted average score out of 100 to reviews from mainstream critics, No Kings received an average score of 80% based on 8 reviews, indicating "generally favorable reviews".

City Pages included it on the "Minnesota's Best Albums of 2011" list.

== Track listing ==
No.	Title	Lyrics	Music	Length
1.	"No Way"	Sims; Mike Mictlan; Cecil Otter; P.O.S	Cecil Otter; Lazerbeak; P.O.S	4:29
2.	"Bolt Cutter"	P.O.S; Sims; Dessa; Mike Mictlan	Cecil Otter; Lazerbeak; P.O.S	4:30
3.	"Bangarang"	P.O.S; Cecil Otter; Sims; Mike Mictlan	Cecil Otter; Lazerbeak	4:02
4.	"Beacon"	Dessa; P.O.S; Cecil Otter; Sims	Cecil Otter	4:11
5.	"Punch-Out"	Mike Mictlan; Sims	Lazerbeak	1:58
6.	"Little Mercy" (featuring Channy Casselle)	Cecil Otter; Dessa	Cecil Otter	4:17
7.	"The Grand Experiment"	Dessa; Sims; Cecil Otter; Mike Mictlan; P.O.S	Cecil Otter	3:47
8.	"String Theory"	Dessa; Sims; Cecil Otter	Lazerbeak	3:01
9.	"Team the Best Team"	P.O.S; Sims; Cecil Otter; Dessa; Mike Mictlan	Lazerbeak	4:36
10.	"Gimme the Go"	Cecil Otter; Sims	Cecil Otter; Lazerbeak; P.O.S	2:59
11.	"Own Yours"	P.O.S; Sims; Mike Mictlan; Cecil Otter	Cecil Otter; Lazerbeak	5:19
12.	"Fresh New Trash"	Sims; Cecil Otter; P.O.S; Dessa; Mike Mictlan	Cecil Otter; Lazerbeak; P.O.S; Paper Tiger	3:39

== Charts ==
Chart	Peak position
US Heatseekers Albums (Billboard)	3
US Independent Albums (Billboard)	31
US Top Rap Albums (Billboard)	23
