= Doomtree (album) =

Studio album by Doomtree
- Released: July 29, 2008
- Genre: Hip hop
- Length: 57:40
- Label: Doomtree Records
- Producers: MK Larada; Lazerbeak; Paper Tiger; P.O.S; Turbo Nemesis; Maker

Doomtree chronology
False Hopes (2007)	Doomtree (2008)	FH:XV (False Hopes 15) (2009)

Professional ratings
Review scores
Source	Rating
Okayplayer	75/100
Pitchfork	6.0/10

Doomtree is the first official studio album by Minneapolis hip hop collective Doomtree. It was released by Doomtree Records on July 29, 2008.

== Critical reception ==
Andrew Martin of Okayplayer gave the album a 75 out of 100, saying: "Similar to the production, the rapping on here ranges from above-average to incredible." Ben Westhoff of Pitchfork gave the album a 6.0 out of 10, saying, "even folks without 18 leftie bumper stickers on their cars will find it hard not to get caught up in the group's enthusiasm."

Chris Riemenschneider of Star Tribune placed it at number 6 on the "Best Local Albums of 2008" list. Adam Bernard of RapReviews.com placed it at number 4 on the "Top 10 Hip-Hop Albums of 2008" list.

== Track listing ==
No.	Title	Lyrics	Music	Length
1.	"Close Your Ears"		MK Larada, Turbo Nemesis	1:24
2.	"Drumsticks"	Cecil Otter; Mike Mictlan; Dessa; P.O.S; Sims	Lazerbeak	2:37
3.	"Gander Back"	Mike Mictlan; P.O.S; Sims	P.O.S; Turbo Nemesis	3:18
4.	"The Wren"	Sims; Dessa	Lazerbeak	3:43
5.	"Gameshow Host"	Mike Mictlan; Sims; Cecil Otter	Lazerbeak; Turbo Nemesis	3:58
6.	"Dots & Dashes"	Dessa; P.O.S	MK Larada	3:24
7.	"Game Over (Go Big or Go Home Boy)"	Mike Mictlan	Paper Tiger; Turbo Nemesis	3:30
8.	"Real Class"		MK Larada	0:49
9.	"Last Call"	Dessa; Cecil Otter	MK Larada	4:15
10.	"Accident"	Sims; P.O.S	Lazerbeak	3:39
11.	"Sadie Hawkins"	Dessa	Maker	2:57
12.	"The Walrus"		MK Larada	0:49
13.	"Twentyfourseven"	I Self Devine; Sims; Mike Mictlan	Lazerbeak	3:30
14.	"Let Me Tell You Baby"	Cecil Otter	MK Larada	3:19
15.	"Down the Line"	Sims; Mike Mictlan	Lazerbeak	3:20
16.	"Kid Gloves"	Mike Mictlan; Dessa	Lazerbeak	3:35
17.	"Pop Gun War"	Sims	Lazerbeak	2:54
18.	"Reintroduction"		MK Larada; Turbo Nemesis	0:42
19.	"Liver Let Die"	P.O.S	Paper Tiger	2:55
20.	"I'm Talking"	Sims; Mike Mictlan; Crescent Moon; P.O.S	Lazerbeak	3:46
21.	"Jaded"	Dessa; Cecil Otter; P.O.S	MK Larada	3:07

== Charts ==
Chart	Peak position
US Top Heatseekers: West North Central (Billboard)	7
