= All Hands (album) =

Studio album by Doomtree
- Released: January 27, 2015
- Genre: Hip-hop
- Length: 56:58
- Label: Doomtree Records
- Producers: Lazerbeak; Paper Tiger; Cecil Otter; P.O.S

Doomtree chronology
No Kings (2011)	All Hands (2015)

Professional ratings
Aggregate scores
Source	Rating
Metacritic	62/100
Review scores
Source	Rating
AllMusic	favorable
Consequence of Sound	C+
HipHopDX	3.5/5
Pitchfork	7.1/10
PopMatters	5/10 stars

All Hands is the third official studio album by Minneapolis hip-hop collective Doomtree. It was released by Doomtree Records on January 27, 2015. It peaked at number 95 on the Billboard 200 chart.

== Critical reception ==
At Metacritic, which assigns a weighted average score out of 100 to reviews from mainstream critics, All Hands received an average score of 62% based on 5 reviews, indicating "generally favorable reviews".

== Track listing ==
No.	Title	Lyrics	Music	Length
1.	"Final Boss"	Sims; Dessa; P.O.S; Mike Mictlan	Lazerbeak	4:34
2.	"My Own Nation"	Sims; Mike Mictlan; Dessa; P.O.S	Paper Tiger; Lazerbeak	3:37
3.	".38 Airweight"	P.O.S; Sims; Cecil Otter; Mike Mictlan	Cecil Otter; Lazerbeak	4:10
4.	"Gray Duck"	Mike Mictlan; Dessa; P.O.S; Sims	Cecil Otter; Lazerbeak; Paper Tiger	4:04
5.	"Heavy Rescue"	Cecil Otter; Dessa; P.O.S; Sims	Cecil Otter; Lazerbeak	4:45
6.	"80 on 80"	P.O.S; Sims; Dessa; Mike Mictlan; Cecil Otter	Cecil Otter	4:32
7.	"Mini Brute"	P.O.S; Dessa; Cecil Otter; Sims; Mike Mictlan	Cecil Otter	4:30
8.	"Cabin Killer"	Dessa; Sims; Mike Mictlan; Cecil Otter; P.O.S	Cecil Otter; Lazerbeak; Paper Tiger	3:55
9.	"Beastface"	Sims; P.O.S; Mike Mictlan	P.O.S	4:02
10.	"The Bends"	Dessa; P.O.S; Sims; Cecil Otter; Mike Mictlan	Cecil Otter	4:06
11.	"Generator"	Mike Mictlan; P.O.S; Dessa	Paper Tiger	3:36
12.	"Off in the Deep"	P.O.S; Sims; Dessa	Paper Tiger	3:41
13.	"Marathon"	Sims; Dessa; Mike Mictlan; Cecil Otter; P.O.S	Cecil Otter	7:26

== Charts ==
Chart	Peak position
US Billboard 200	95
US Independent Albums (Billboard)	15
US Tastemakers (Billboard)	3
US Top R&B/Hip-Hop Albums (Billboard)	10
US Top Rap Albums (Billboard)	8
US Vinyl Albums (Billboard)	6
