= Mike Mictlan =

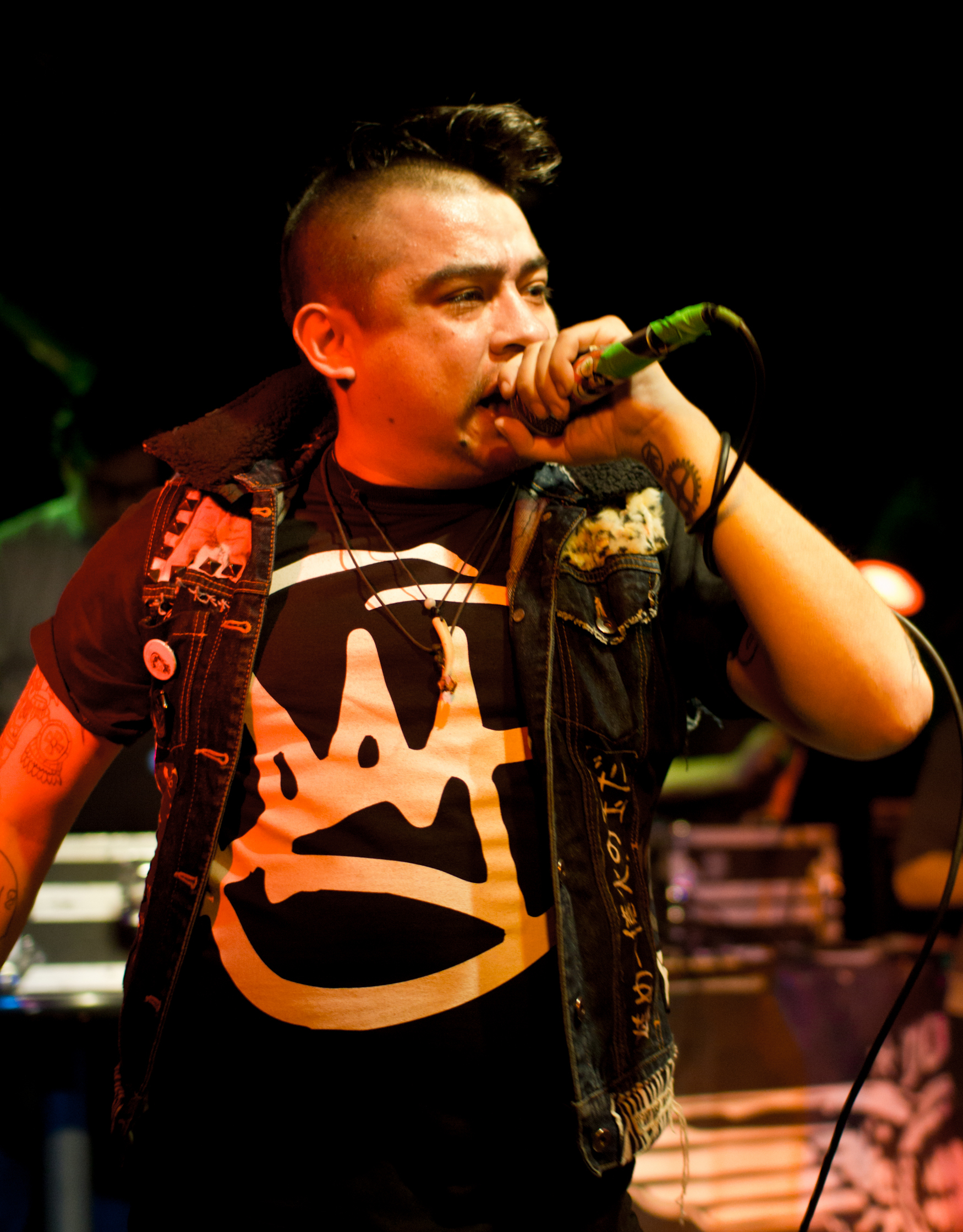
- Mictlan performing in Scottsdale, Arizona in 2012

Background information
- Also known as: Mictlan
- Born: Michael Thomas Marquez; July 8, 1982 (age 44); Los Angeles, California, U.S.
- Origin: Minneapolis, Minnesota, U.S.
- Genres: Hip-hop; alternative hip-hop
- Occupations: Rapper
- Years active: 2001–present
- Label: Doomtree Records
- Website: www.doomtree.net/mikemictlan/

Michael Thomas Marquez (born July 8, 1982), better known by his stage name Mike Mictlan ([ˈmikt͡ɬaːn]), is a rapper from Los Angeles, California, who is currently based in Minneapolis, Minnesota.

He is a founding member of the indie hip-hop collective Doomtree and the hip-hop duo The Mercenaries. Mike Mictlan has released four solo albums and is currently signed to Doomtree Records. City Pages listed him as the 10th best Minnesota rapper in 2012.

== Early life ==
Marquez was born in Los Angeles, California, to a Vietnam veteran father from Venice, Italy, and an American mother, who is from Anaheim. Mike is of Mexican descent. During his childhood, he grew up in Los Angeles with a father who was battling cancer and without a mother as she was in prison for most of the time he was growing up. At the age of 11, he had the dream of becoming a full-time hip-hop artist and being part of a hip-hop group.

By the time Marquez reached his teenage years, he was sent to live with his uncle in Minneapolis, Minnesota. He attended Hopkins High School where he would create the foundations of Doomtree with P.O.S, Paper Tiger, MK Larada and Lazerbeak. When asked on meeting P.O.S on his first day at Hopkins High School, Marquez stated, "He had a little patch of blue in his hair, and he came up and asked me if I wanted to buy this homemade punk zine he had for $1.”

Following high school, he returned to Los Angeles. During this time, he held various odd jobs, including working as a butcher.

After four years of living in Los Angeles, Marquez participated in a tour with Doomtree in 2004, being openers for Sage Francis. This eventually lead Marquez into moving back to Minneapolis and officially help create Doomtree as a hip-hop collective and label.

His first appearance on record was on P.O.S's short lived hip-hop group Cenospecies's album Indefinition in 2002. His feature was recorded through the phone while he was still living in Los Angeles.

== Musical career ==
=== 2005-2008: False Hopes and The Mercenaries ===
In 2005, Marquez released his first album False Hopes Eight: Deity for Re-Hire. The False Hopes album series consisted of 15 releases from Doomtree and its members, such as Dessa's debut or Doomtree's album. False Hopes Eight: Deity for Re-Hire was released without the help of a record label or distribution, instead using money earned from Doomtree's shows, who would release the album independently. In 2007, he released the album The First Chapter as The Mercenaries with Mnemonic, on Top Nation Records. So far, it is the only Mike Mictlan album that was not released on Doomtree.

=== 2009-2013: Hand Over Fist, No Kings and Snaxxx ===
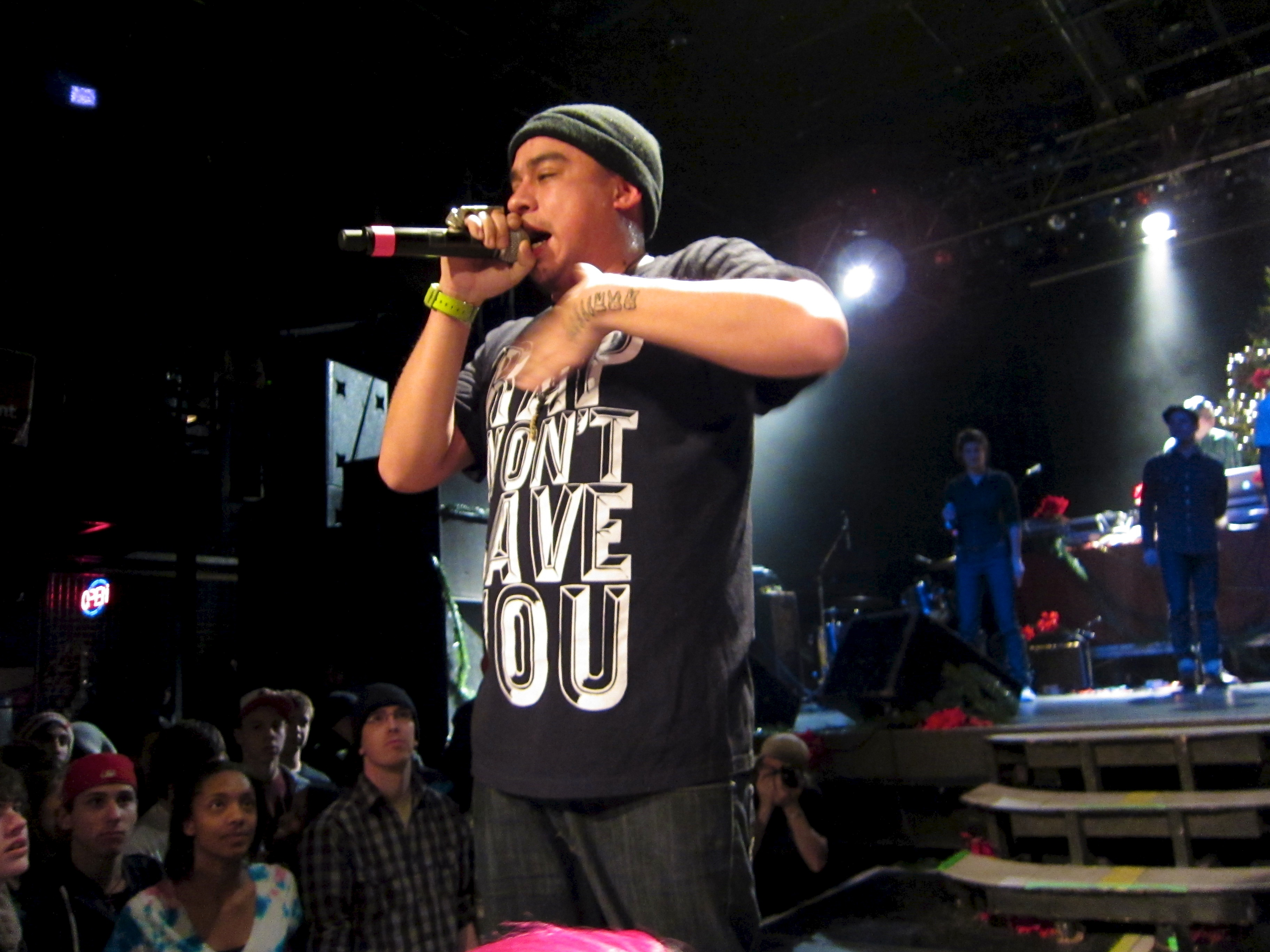
Mike Mictlan of Doomtree in 2010

Following this and Doomtree's False Hopes, Doomtree released their debut LP in 2008, with Mictlan releasing his follow up album Hand Over Fist a collaborative album with Lazerbeak, the same year. In 2011, Doomtree released their critically acclaimed album No Kings.

He also curated one of the Doomtree Blowout shows at 7th Street Entry in December 2011. Ada Katarina of Mezzic described the night as "a high-energy mix of styles, ages, love for the rap scene that has supported him and a whole lot of wag." This span of his career to currently, he and his Doomtree cohorts toured extensively, with them booking many solo and group tours both nationally and overseas.

The next year in September, he released Snaxxx for free via his bandcamp.

In 2013, Mictlan spent 72 hours staying in a mental ward, where he was detained due to a drug problem he had been having at the time.

=== 2014-present: Hella Frreal and All Hands ===
In 2014, Mictlan released Hella Frreal, a ten-song LP featuring artists such as Ceschi and production from Cecil Otter and Lazerbeak, among others. Doomtree's third album, All Hands, was released in 2015.

== Discography ==
=== Studio albums ===
- False Hopes Eight: Deity for Re-Hire (2005)
- Hand over Fist (2008) (with Lazerbeak)
- Snaxxx (2012)
- Hella Frreal (2014)

=== Singles ===
- "Cogs + Flywheels" (2011)

=== The Mercenaries ===
- The First Chapter (2007)

=== Guest appearances ===
- Sims - "Market Made Murder" and "No Homeowners" from Lights Out Paris (2005)
- P.O.S - "Living Slightly Larger" from Audition (2006)
- Mel Gibson and the Pants - "Stress Fracture" from Sea vs. Shining Sea (2007)
- F.Stokes - "Blessings" from Death of a Handsome Bride (2009)
- P.O.S - "Get Down" from We Don't Even Live Here (2012)
