= False Hopes (Doomtree album) =

Studio album by Doomtree
- Released: December 16, 2007
- Genres: Alternative hip-hop; underground hip-hop
- Length: 39:43
- Label: Doomtree Records
- Producers: Cecil Otter; Paper Tiger; Lazerbeak; MK Larada; P.O.S

Doomtree chronology
False Hopes (2007)	Doomtree (2008)

Professional ratings
Review scores
Source	Rating
HipHopDX	3.5/5 stars

False Hopes is a series of albums from Minneapolis indie hip-hop collective Doomtree. These albums are released in between official releases and the content sometimes reappears on the official releases in a reworked fashion. This is the 12th False Hopes installment and the 1st to feature all members of Doomtree.

== Track listing ==
No.	Title	Lyrics	Music	Length
1.	"Flex"	P.O.S; Sims; Dessa; Mike Mictlan	Cecil Otter	3:01
2.	"Knives on Fire"	Sims; Mike Mictlan; P.O.S	Paper Tiger	2:59
3.	"Traveling Dunk Tank"	P.O.S; Cecil Otter	Cecil Otter	3:20
4.	"A Candle in Chicago (Interlude)"		Cecil Otter	1:53
5.	"Lucky"	Sims	Paper Tiger	1:30
6.	"Veteran"	Dessa	Lazerbeak	2:43
7.	"Slow Burn"	Sims; Mike Mictlan	MK Larada	3:56
8.	"I Should Cut Your Liver Out (Interlude)"		MK Larada	1:15
9.	"Savion Glover"	P.O.S	P.O.S	2:22
10.	"Hot Monotony"	Mike Mictlan; Sims; P.O.S	Lazerbeak	3:46
11.	"A Hundred Fathers"	Cecil Otter	Cecil Otter	3:50
12.	"Check Your Tuning (Interlude)"		P.O.S	1:32
13.	"If & When"	Dessa	MK Larada	4:18
14.	"No Homeowners (Renter's Rebate)"	Cecil Otter; Dessa; Mike Mictlan; P.O.S; Sims	MK Larada; Cecil Otter; Paper Tiger; Lazerbeak	3:18
