= Shredders (music group) =

American hip hop group

- Origin: Minneapolis, Minnesota, U.S.
- Genres: Hip hop
- Years active: 2016–present
- Labels: Doomtree Records
- Spinoff of: Doomtree
- Members: P.O.S; Sims; Lazerbeak; Paper Tiger
- Website: shredddders.com

Shredders is an American hip hop group from Minneapolis, Minnesota. It consists of rappers P.O.S and Sims and producers Lazerbeak and Paper Tiger. The four are part of the Doomtree collective. The group's debut studio album, Dangerous Jumps, peaked at number 43 on Billboard's Independent Albums chart.

== History ==
At the end of the tour for All Hands in 2015, Minneapolis hip hop collective Doomtree decided to take a short break, allowing each member to focus on their own projects. P.O.S, Sims, Lazerbeak, and Paper Tiger, who are four-sevenths of the collective, formed the group Shredders in 2016. Producers Lazerbeak and Paper Tiger started trading tracks between New York and Minneapolis. Around tour dates for their respective solo albums, rappers P.O.S and Sims took hold of those beats and started trading verses over them.

In 2017, Shredders released a self-titled debut EP. It was followed by the singles "Xanthrax" and "Flipping Cars". In that year, the group released the debut studio album, Dangerous Jumps. It peaked at number 43 on Billboard's Independent Albums chart.

In 2019, the group released the singles "Ayeyayaya", "Suburban Base", and "Vanilla ISIS". In that year, the group also released a studio album, Great Hits.

== Discography ==
=== Studio albums ===
- Dangerous Jumps (2017)
- Great Hits (2019)

=== EPs ===
- Shredders (2017)
- Close Cuts (2024)

=== Singles ===
- "Xanthrax" (2017)
- "Flipping Cars" (2017)
- "Ayeyayaya" (2019)
- "Suburban Base" (2019)
- "Vanilla ISIS" (2019)
