= Culture Cry Wolf =

American band

- Origin: Minneapolis, Minnesota
- Genre: Alternative hip-hop
- Years active: 2009–2013
- Members: Mike Daly; Botzy; Druby Soho; Jaime Pelaez; Frankie Blydenburgh; Kyle Borchert
- Past members: Daniel de la Torre; Paul Mathis
- Website: www.culturecrywolf.com

Culture Cry Wolf was a live band based in Minneapolis, Minnesota. Heavily involved in the Twin Cities hip-hop scene, they blend ska, punk rock, reggae, and even doo-wop.

== History ==
Culture Cry Wolf formed in 2009, after Mike Daly and Botzy met at a house party.

They released The Wesley Opus Sessions in August 2010. Their first music video for the single "Come Come" was released on August 29, 2010.

They spent the next year writing and recording their first full-length album, Dia de los Muertos. The album was self-released in November 2011. Several music videos have been released from this album, including: "Day of the Dead", "Sweet Marie", "Romeo", "Me, Myself and I", and "Second Wind" which features Sims of Doomtree which was premiered on the national publication "Baeble Music".

The band released The Sapient Sessions on May 14, 2013. The EP was produced by Sapient, and features guest verses by Astronautalis, Psalm One, Mac Lethal, Toki Wright and Maria Isa.

Culture Cry Wolf officially disbanded on May 18, 2013. Their release show for The Sapient Sessions served as their official farewell show.

== Discography ==
=== Albums ===
- Dia de los Muertos (2011)

=== EPs ===
- The Wesley Opus Sessions (2010)
- The Sapient Sessions (2013)

=== Singles ===
- "Come Come" (2010)
