= Twin Cities hip-hop =

Hip-hop scene in Minneapolis and St. Paul, Minnesota

Twin Cities hip-hop, also referred to as Minneapolis hip-hop, is a subgenre of Midwestern hip-hop music that originates from the Minneapolis–Saint Paul metropolitan area in the U.S. state of Minnesota.

== History ==
Hip-hop culture in the Twin Cities can be traced as far back as 1981. Similar to the development of hip-hop in the South Bronx, Twin Cities rap started as parties with a DJ and an emcee. A DJ named Travitron is considered the "godfather" of hip-hop in the Twin Cities, and began hosting Hip Hop Shop on 89.9 KMOJ, the first radio station to play Hip Hop in the Twin Cities.

The first Twin Cities hip-hop vinyl record released was from the rap group I.R.M. Crew, led by Kelly "Kel-C" Crockett from North Minneapolis. Members were Devastating Dee, TLC, Kel-C, IBM and Cuttin' Kal. "I Dream of DJ’s" was released in 1986, followed by "Baseball" in 1987. Wide Angle, which doubled as a record store and indie recording label, is considered the first Twin Cities independent hip-hop label, with releases on vinyl from Shampayle, the twin cities first female rapper released on vinyl.

David "T.C." Ellis was featured on a Prince song "Graffiti Bridge" in 1990. Further, Ellis's album "True Confessions" was the first rap album released on the Paisley Park label in 1991.

Graffiti and B-boy crews existed in the city. However, the first verifiable rap record to be released in Minnesota was "The Twin City Rapp," a vinyl single on TwinTown Records released in 1985. It was produced and performed by David "T.C." Ellis and C.T., and released by the Twin City Rappers.

== Festivals ==
The now defunct annual Twin Cities Celebration of Hip-Hop, also known as The Hip Hop Fest, was cofounded by Larry Lucio, Jr. and Toki Wright of Amplified Life in 2002. It was hosted by Claire Redmond, FranzDiego DaHinten, Dimitris Kelly, and Alicia Steele of YO! The Movement. The event featured performances from National headlining artists and local acts.

Rhymesayers Entertainment started sponsoring the Soundset Music Festival, the first being held at the Metrodome parking lot in 2008. Soundset quickly became a popular festival and moved to Canterbury Park grounds in Shakopee, Minnesota, before moving to the Minnesota State Fair grounds.

== Venues ==
The well known Minneapolis venue First Avenue has been a typical location for major performances of Twin Cities hip-hop. Other common places for shows around the cities include Honey Lounge (closed), Nomad World Pub (closed), Triple Rock (closed), Blue Nile (closed), Myth and the Fine Line. The Dinkytowner was a common place for smaller shows until its closing in 2009.

Fifth Element was home to Last of the Record Buyer's showcase, which provided a platform for producers.

Graffiti can be found throughout the twin cities, sanctioned and not. One popular place for writers to write legally was known as the Bomb Shelter.

Hope Community is home to Graffiti and hip-hop production classes; many active artists in the community have passed through its doors.

Intermedia Arts was a nonprofit in Uptown Minneapolis which closed in 2018. Intermedia Arts allowed public art and offered workshops/programs/ grant opportunities for artists in the cities. It was at Intermedia Arts that Desdamona co-founded the first festival dedicated to women in hip-hop, B-Girl Be.

== Notable artists ==
- Atmosphere
- Audio Perm
- Brother Ali
- Cecil Otter
- Desdamona
- Dessa
- DJ Abilities
- Doomtree
- Eyedea
- Face Candy
- Gozie Ukaga
- Heiruspecs
- I Self Devine
- Kill the Vultures
- Lazerbeak
- Lexii Alijai
- Lizzo
- Manny Phesto
- Mike Mictlan
- Los Nativos
- Musab
- Muja Messiah
- Oddjobs
- Orikal Uno
- Paper Tiger
- P.O.S
- Prof
- Sims

== Radio ==
- KCMP 89.3 (The Current) - Home of Rhymesayer's H2 Radio as well as The Local Show which plays some popular local hip-hop
- KFAI 90.3/106.7 FM - Hosts Soul Tools Radio every Saturday hosted by local Hip Hop artists Toki Wright.
- KMOJ 89.9 FM - Home of popular show "Rush it or Flush it" where artists submit music to be voted on by the audience
- KUOM 770 AM (Radio K) - University of Minnesota College Radio. They feature a "Track of the Day" from local artists.
- WMCN 91.7 FM - Macalester College Radio - weekly hip-hop radio shows featuring live performances and interviews with many local artists.
