= Never Better (album) =

Studio album by P.O.S
- Released: February 3, 2009
- Genre: Hip-hop
- Length: 55:38
- Label: Rhymesayers Entertainment
- Producers: Lazerbeak; P.O.S; Paper Tiger; Dosh; MK Larada

P.O.S chronology
Audition (2006)	Never Better (2009)	We Don't Even Live Here (2012)

Never Better is the third solo studio album by American rapper P.O.S. It was released on Rhymesayers Entertainment in the year 2009. It peaked at number 106 on the Billboard 200 chart.

== Production ==
Over half of the record is produced by P.O.S himself, along with contributions from Doomtree producers Lazerbeak, Paper Tiger and MK Larada. It features guest verses from Doomtree compatriots Sims, Cecil Otter and Dessa, as well as Astronautalis.

== Release ==
The first single "Goodbye" was released in December, 2008. The second single "Drumroll (We're All Thirsty)" was released in January, 2009 on iTunes and Amazon.com. The track "Savion Glover" is a remix of a track previously released on Doomtree's False Hopes in 2007.

The album was released in a limited custom transparent digipak edition designed by Minneapolis designer Eric Carlson. It features 16 solid picture inserts with 6 plastic overlays, allowing the owner to create their own cover art combinations.

== Critical reception ==
Professional ratings
Aggregate scores
Source	Rating
Metacritic	75/100
Review scores
Source	Rating
AbsolutePunk	91%
AllMusic	3.5/5 stars
The A.V. Club	B+
Consequence of Sound	C+
HipHopDX	4/5 stars
NME	6/10
The Phoenix	3.5/4 stars
Pitchfork	7/10
XLR8R	7.5/10

At Metacritic, which assigns a weighted average score out of 100 to reviews from mainstream critics, the album received an average score of 75, based on 8 reviews, indicating "generally favorable reviews".

Many reviewers on RapReviews.com placed this album in their top ten list for 2009, with it even claiming the number one spot in a few.

== Track listing ==
No.	Title	Producer(s)	Length
1.	"Let It Rattle"	Lazerbeak	3:33
2.	"Drumroll (We're All Thirsty)"	P.O.S	2:37
3.	"Savion Glover"	P.O.S	2:19
4.	"Purexed"	Lazerbeak	3:24
5.	"Graves (We Wrote the Book)"	Lazerbeak	3:14
6.	"Goodbye"	Lazerbeak	3:07
7.	"Get Smokes" (featuring Jessy Greene)	P.O.S	2:38
8.	"Been Afraid"	Lazerbeak	3:39
9.	"Low Light Low Life" (featuring Sims, Cecil Otter, and Dessa)	Paper Tiger	3:14
10.	"The Basics (Alright)"	P.O.S	3:23
11.	"Out of Category"	P.O.S	3:16
12.	"Optimist (We Are Not for Them)"	P.O.S	3:19
13.	"Terrorish" (featuring Jason Shevchuk)	P.O.S	2:13
14.	"Never Better" (featuring Judah Nagler)	P.O.S	4:03
15.	"The Brave and the Snake"	MK Larada	3:53
16.	"Handmade/Handgun" (hidden track; featuring Astronautalis)	P.O.S	5:58

Deluxe edition bonus track
No.	Title	Producer(s)	Length
17.	"Slint" (featuring Maggie Morrison)	P.O.S	2:35

== Personnel ==
Credits adapted from liner notes.

- P.O.S – vocals, guitar, bass guitar, keyboards, organ, production (2, 3, 7, 10, 11, 12, 13, 14, 16, 17)
- Matt Scharenbroich – drums (1)
- Lazerbeak – production (1, 4, 5, 6, 8), vocals (2), piano (5, 6), keyboards (5), organ (6)
- Eric Timothy Carlson – vocals (2), artwork
- Glorily Velez – vocals (2)
- Joel Anderson – vocals (2)
- Julie Kravitz – vocals (2)
- Ruben Vela II – vocals (2)
- Ryan Cybul – vocals (2)
- The Bled – vocals (2)
- Mike the 2600 King – turntables (3)
- Turbo Nemesis – turntables (7)
- Jessy Greene – violin (7)
- Paper Tiger – production (9)
- Dessa – vocals (9)
- Sims – vocals (9)
- Cecil Otter – vocals (9)
- F.Stokes – vocals (10)
- Maria Juranic – handclaps (12)
- Jason Shevchuk – vocals (13)
- Judah Nagler – vocals (14)
- MK Larada – production (15)
- Astronautalis – vocals (16)
- Maggie Morrison – vocals (17)
- Joe Mabbott – engineering, mixing
- B. Sayers – executive production
- S. Daley – executive production
- S. Alexander – executive production
- Chris Gehringer – mastering
- Adam Garcia – photography
- Brian Lesterberg – photography
- Dan Monick – photography
- Julien Murray – photography

== Charts ==
Chart	Peak position
US Billboard 200	106
US Top R&B/Hip-Hop Albums (Billboard)	67
US Top Rap Albums (Billboard)	23
US Heatseekers Albums (Billboard)	1
US Independent Albums (Billboard)	12
US Indie Store Album Sales (Billboard)	13
US Vinyl Albums (Billboard)	4
