= Air Credits =

American hip-hop group

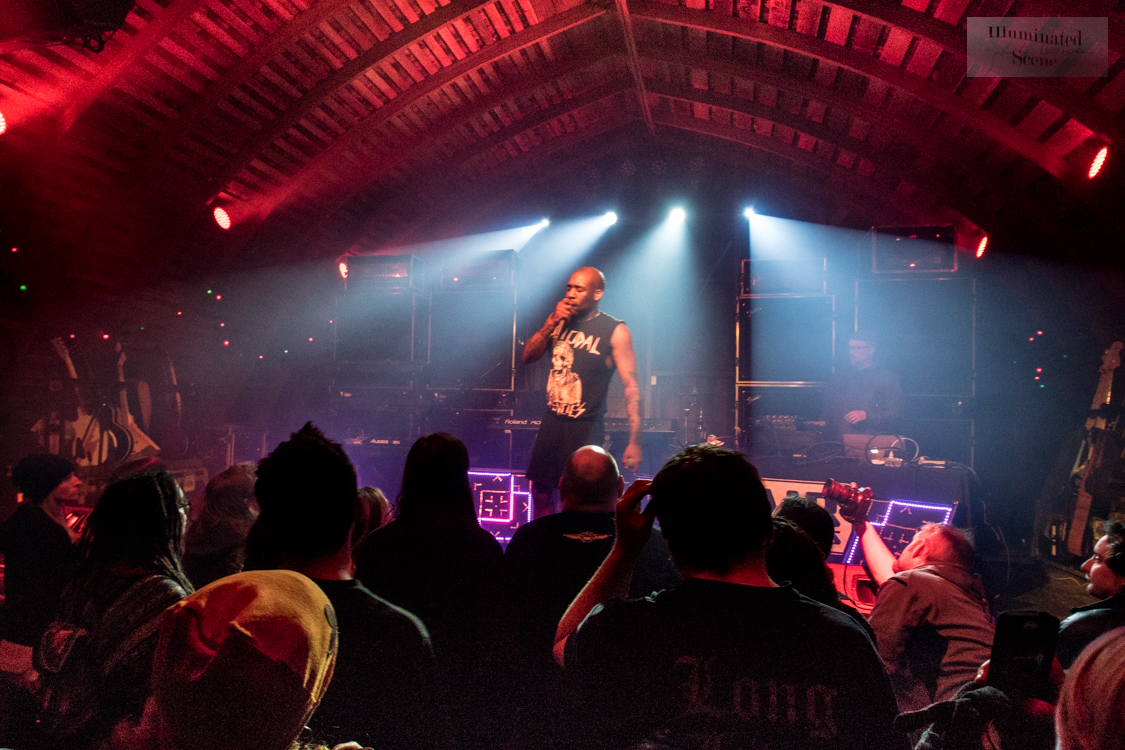

Background information
- Origin: Chicago, Illinois
- Genre: Hip-hop
- Years active: 2016–present
- Label: Doomtree Records
- Members: Showyousuck; Steve Reidell
- Past members: Aaron Brink
- Website: aircredits.org

Air Credits is an American hip-hop group from Chicago, Illinois. It consists of rapper Showyousuck and producer Steve Reidell. NPR included the group in the "Eight New Artists to Watch in 2018" list.

== Career ==
Air Credits was originally formed by Showyousuck and the Hood Internet members Steve Reidell and Aaron Brink. The group released the debut album, Broadcasted, in 2016. Chicago Tribune included it on the "15 Amazing Chicago Albums You May Have Missed in 2016" list. They toured with Doomtree rapper Sims in November and December 2016.

In 2017, Air Credits released Omega Virus. It included "Safe Room", the music video for which was premiered by Fake Shore Drive. In that year, the group released a remix of Sims' "OneHundred" in honor of the first anniversary of his album More Than Ever.

2018 brought the release of Artería Verité, a collaborative album with Sims and Icetep.

== Discography ==
=== Albums ===
- Broadcasted (2016)
- Artería Verité (2018) (with Sims and Icetep)
- Believe That You're Here (2021)

=== EPs ===
- Omega Virus (2017)
- Wasteland Radio New Archives [Green/376] (2018)
- Wasteland Radio New Archives [Blue/659] (2019)

=== Singles ===
- "Hack the Planet" (2017)
- "Safe Room" (2017)
- "A.C.R.E.A.M." (2017)
- "Cannon" (2018) (with Sims and Icetep)
