= Hand over Fist =

Studio album by Hand over Fist
- Released: July 14, 2009
- Genre: Indie hip-hop
- Length: 42:31
- Labels: Doomtree, DTR 017
- Producer: Lazerbeak

Mike Mictlan chronology
| False Hopes Eight: Deity for Re-Hire (2005) | Hand over Fist (2009) | Snaxxx (2012) |

Lazerbeak chronology
| Crusades (2006) | Hand over Fist (2008) | Legend Recognize Legend (2010) |

Professional ratings
Review scores
| Source | Rating |
|---|---|
| RapReviews | 8/10 |

Hand over Fist is the self-titled debut and sole album by the Minnesota hip-hop duo Hand over Fist, a collaboration between rapper Mike Mictlan and producer Lazerbeak, both members of Minneapolis hip-hop collective Doomtree. The album was released on Doomtree Records on October 14, 2008.

== Music ==
Hand over Fist is entirely produced by Doomtree member Lazerbeak. The album includes one feature from fellow Doomtree member P.O.S.

== Track listing ==
| No. | Title | Length |
|---|---|---|
| 1. | "Hand over Fist" | 1:51 |
| 2. | "Suicide Jimmy Snuffa" | 3:06 |
| 3. | "Clam Casino" | 2:02 |
| 4. | "SHUX" (feat. P.O.S) | 3:25 |
| 5. | "Wolf Tickets" | 3:25 |
| 6. | "LA Raiders Hat" | 3:21 |
| 7. | "Fire on the Watermark" | 5:30 |
| 8. | "Northstarrr" | 2:27 |
| 9. | "Butcher's Lament" | 3:32 |
| 10. | "Head Full" | 2:41 |
| 11. | "Head Fuller" | 3:15 |
| 12. | "Young Hunger" | 3:49 |
| 13. | "Prizefight" | 4:07 |

== Personnel ==
Adapted from liner notes:

=== Musicians ===
==== Hand over Fist ====
- Mike Mictlan – vocals
- Lazerbeak – producer

==== Featured artist(s) ====
- P.O.S – vocals (on "SHUX")

==== Additional musicians ====
- Jimmy2Times – scratching (on "Suicide Jimmy Snuffa", "Wolf Tickets" and "Northstarrr")
  - credited as "scrapper" on "Suicide Jimmy Snuffa"
- Turbo Nemesis – scratching (on "Head Fuller", "Young Hunger" and "Prizefighter")
- Nell Powers Graham – additional vocals (on "Clams Casino")
- Joe Mabbott – additional vocals (on "LA Raiders Hat")
- Omaur Bliss – additional vocals (on "Young Hunger")

=== Technical personnel ===
- Joe Mabbott – recording engineer, mixing engineer
  - P.O.S – vocal recording engineer (except on "SHUX", "Wolf Tickets", "Fire on the Watermark", "Head Fuller" and "Prizefighter")
  - Joe Mabbot – vocal recording engineer (on "SHUX", "Fire on the Watermark", "Head Fuller" and "Prizefighter")
  - Lazerbeak – vocal recording engineer (on "Wolf Tickets")
- Bruce Templeton, Dave Gardner – mastering engineer
- Lizardman, MK Larada – artwork
- Bo Hakala – photography
