= False Hope =

False Hope or False Hopes may refer to:

- "Hope Torture (False Hope)", a 2013 song by Song Ji-eun from Hope Torture
- False Hope, a 2017 EP by Kevin Garrett
- False Hopes (Dessa EP), 2005
- False Hopes (Doomtree album), 2007
- Cecil Otter's False Hopes, 2005
