= Ipecac Neat =

Studio album by P.O.S
- Released: March 16, 2004
- Genre: Hip-hop
- Length: 60:39
- Label: Doomtree Records
- Producers: MK Larada; Lazerbeak; P.O.S; Emily Bloodmobile

P.O.S chronology
Ipecac Neat (2004)	Audition (2006)

Ipecac Neat is the first studio album by American rapper P.O.S. It was released on Doomtree Records in 2004. It was re-released on Rhymesayers Entertainment in 2005.

== Production ==
P.O.S began his hip-hop career as half of a rap duo called Cenospecies. After the duo broke up, they were still booked to play at several more shows. Because P.O.S was contractually obligated to perform at these shows, he had to write songs that he could perform solo. He told City Pages in 2014 that Ipecac Neat consisted of "pretty much every solo song" that he had written up to that point. Half of the album was recorded in P.O.S's own basement and the other half in a neighbor's living room, as opposed to a recording studio.

== Critical reception ==
Professional ratings
Review scores
Source	Rating
AllMusic	4/5 stars

Marisa Brown of AllMusic gave the album 4 out of 5 stars, describing it as "an energetic, angry, intense record with dark, engaging Aesop Rock-like beats that incorporate guitar and strings loops, purposeful drums, and ominous scratches." She added, "The melodies and harmonies switch from song to song, but there's a consistency in the production, so much so that it, along with the heaviness and anger, begins to sound a bit repetitive and even weighs down the album."

== Track listing ==
No.	Title	Producer(s)	Length
1.	"Gimme Gimme Gunshots"	MK Larada	4:04
2.	"Meth-head vs. McNugget"	Lazerbeak	3:48
3.	"Hunger Pains Three" (featuring Crescent Moon)	P.O.S; Emily Bloodmobile	3:42
4.	"Thatone"	P.O.S	4:30
5.	"Sarah Silverman"	Emily Bloodmobile	1:46
6.	"Music for Shoplifting"	MK Larada	3:21
7.	"Kicking Knowledge in the Face"	P.O.S; Emily Bloodmobile	4:38
8.	"Ants" (featuring Toki Wright)	P.O.S	3:53
9.	"Kidney Thief"	P.O.S	4:13
10.	"Little Kids"	Lazerbeak; P.O.S	5:03
11.	"I Play the Matador (Redo)"	P.O.S; Emily Bloodmobile	3:13
12.	"Lifetime...Kid Dynamite" (featuring Sims)	P.O.S; Emily Bloodmobile	3:46
13.	"Interlude"	P.O.S	0:23
14.	"Dead Music" (featuring Crescent Moon)	Emily Bloodmobile	4:00
15.	"Duct Tape"	Lazerbeak	3:48
16.	"I Play the Matador (Original Redo)" (featuring I Self Devine)	Emily Bloodmobile	6:31

== Personnel ==
Credits adapted from liner notes.

- P.O.S – vocals, production (3–5, 7–14, 16), recording, engineering
- MK Larada – production (1, 6)
- Lazerbeak – production (2, 10, 15), vocals (10)
- Sims – vocals (2, 12)
- Crescent Moon – vocals (3, 14)
- Sean McPherson – bass guitar (4, 10)
- Toki Wright – vocals (8)
- Cecil Otter – vocals (11)
- I Self Devine – vocals (16)
- Turbo Nemesis – turntables
- Joe Mabbott – mixing
- Christopher Blood – mastering
