= Audition (album) =

Studio album by P.O.S
- Released: January 31, 2006
- Genre: Hip-hop
- Length: 45:30
- Label: Rhymesayers Entertainment
- Producers: P.O.S; Emily Bloodmobile; Lazerbeak; MK Larada

P.O.S chronology
Ipecac Neat (2004)	Audition (2006)	Never Better (2009)

Audition is the second solo studio album by American rapper P.O.S. It was released on Rhymesayers Entertainment in 2006. It peaked at number 45 on the Billboard Independent Albums chart.

== Production ==
P.O.S titled the album "Audition" because he felt he was auditioning for a national audience for the first time, given that his only prior album, Ipecac Neat, had much smaller distribution. On his second album, he set out to make the "most abrasive possible sound" and "some of the songs difficult to listen to." Although the opening words of the album are "First of all, fuck Bush," P.O.S told The A.V. Club in 2006 that he did not see the album as "overtly political" so much as a social commentary.

P.O.S told City Pages in 2016 that the song "Paul Kersey to Jack Kimball" is about his uncle getting hit and killed by a car and its title is an allusion to the Death Wish film series. The song "P.O.S is Ruining My Life" contains an uncleared sample of an Underoath song; P.O.S had discovered them at Warped Tour before using the sample and later played lead guitar for them at Warped Tour.

Most of the production is credited to both P.O.S and his alias Emily Bloodmobile. Lazerbeak and MK Larada also provide production contributions as well. Guest appearances include Mike Mictlan, Slug, Greg Attonito, Craig Finn, and Maggie Morrison.

== Critical reception ==
Professional ratings
Review scores
Source	Rating
AllMusic	3.5/5 stars
The A.V. Club	A−
Pitchfork	6.2/10
PopMatters	8/10 stars
Punknews.org	4/5 stars
Tiny Mix Tapes	4/5 marks

Marisa Brown of AllMusic gave the album 3.5 out of 5 stars, calling it "a very well-produced album, exciting and musical and intense."

== Track listing ==
No.	Title	Producer(s)	Length
1.	"Audition Ipecac"	P.O.S	0:12
2.	"Half-Cocked Concepts"	P.O.S; Emily Bloodmobile	3:47
3.	"De La Souls" (featuring Greg Attonito)	P.O.S	3:47
4.	"Stand Up (Let's Get Murdered)"	Lazerbeak	3:18
5.	"Bush League Psyche-Out Stuff" (featuring Slug)	P.O.S	4:20
6.	"Paul Kersey to Jack Kimball"	Lazerbeak	2:59
7.	"Safety in Speed (Heavy Metal)" (featuring Craig Finn)	P.O.S	4:19
8.	"The Kill in Me" (featuring Maggie Morrison)	MK Larada	3:24
9.	"Yeah Right (Science, Science)"	P.O.S; Emily Bloodmobile	1:38
10.	"Audition M.D."	P.O.S	0:26
11.	"P.O.S Is Ruining My Life"	P.O.S	3:19
12.	"Living Slightly Larger" (featuring Mike Mictlan)	P.O.S	3:30
13.	"Suicide Uma Schrantz"	P.O.S; Emily Bloodmobile	0:31
14.	"Bleeding Hearts Club (MPLS Chapter)" (featuring Slug)	Lazerbeak	3:20
15.	"A Teddy Bear and a Tazer"	Lazerbeak	3:42
16.	"Audition Mantra"	P.O.S	3:19

== Personnel ==
Credits adapted from liner notes.

- P.O.S – vocals, guitar, bass guitar, synthesizer, production (1–3, 5, 7, 9–13, 16), executive production
- Greg Attonito – vocals (3)
- Lazerbeak – production (4, 6, 14, 15)
- Slug – vocals (5, 14), executive production
- Craig Finn – vocals (7)
- Maggie Morrison – vocals (8)
- MK Larada – production (8), art direction, design
- Mike Mictlan – vocals (12)
- Turbo Nemesis – turntables
- Tasha Baron – electric piano
- Jesse Greene – cello, violin
- Bitsy Hanson – cello
- Passions – vocals
- Joe Mabbott – vocals, recording, mixing
- Ian Campbell – vocals, recording, mixing
- B. Sayers – executive production
- Dan Monick – photography
- Jason Miller – photography
- Josh Syx – photography

== Charts ==
Chart	Peak position
US Independent Albums (Billboard)	45
