= Snaxxx =

Studio album by Mike Mictlan
- Released: September 27, 2012
- Genres: Hip-hop; alternative hip-hop
- Length: 45:35
- Label: Doomtree
- Producers: Paper Tiger; 2% Muck; DJ Rich-Dog; Mike Frey

Mike Mictlan chronology
Hand over Fist (2008)	Snaxxx (2012)	Hella Frreal (2014)

Professional ratings
Review scores
Source	Rating
Potholes In My Blog	Favorable

Snaxxx is the third studio album by American hip-hop artist Mike Mictlan, a member of Minneapolis indie hip-hop collective Doomtree. It was released on Doomtree Records on September 27, 2012 for free download via the label's bandcamp. It was named one of PopMatter's top overlooked albums in 2012.

== Music ==
The album is produced by the likes of Paper Tiger, 2% Muck, DJ Rich-Dog and Mike Frey. Guest appearances include Lizzo, Greg Grease, Spyder Baybie Raw Dog, P.O.S, Z3R0K00L8D, La Manchita, and Freez.

== Track listing ==
No.	Title	Producer	Length
1.	"Kinder Care (My First Words)"	DJ Rich-Dog	0:42
2.	"Creeper Status"	2% Muck	3:27
3.	"Give It To Mikey" (featuring Lizzo)	2% Muck	2:51
4.	"WZRD SCIENCE" (featuring Greg Grease)	2% Muck	3:16
5.	"Spicy Peeñ"	2% Muck	3:55
6.	"Flick Tha Bic"	2% Muck	1:44
7.	"85 Low 105 High"	2% Muck	1:44
8.	"Dwnsze"	Paper Tiger	2:14
9.	"Tryna Go"	Mike Frey	2:45
10.	"HELLA FRREAL"	2% Muck	3:25
11.	"SYKE!" (featuring P.O.S & Spyder Baybie Raw Dog)	2% Muck	2:14
12.	"Let Me Know" (featuring La Manchita, P.O.S & Spyder Baybie Raw Dog)	2% Muck	5:22
13.	"Scottie Pippen" (featuring Spyder Baybie Raw Dog & Z3R0K00L8D)	2% Muck	3:30
14.	"MCAD"	DJ Rich-Dog	4:04
15.	"SNAXXX PAXXX (My Last Words)"	2% Muck	3:29
