= Cut the Body Loose =

Studio album by Astronautalis
- Released: May 13, 2016
- Genre: Hip-hop
- Length: 41:19
- Label: SideOneDummy Records
- Producer: Icetep; Amati; Cecil Otter; Steel Tipped Dove; Lazerbeak; Picnic Tyme; Red Velvet Beats; Rickolus; John Congleton; Adam Pickrell; Astronautalis; Justin Vernon (exec.)

Astronautalis chronology
This Is Our Science (2011)	Cut the Body Loose (2016)

Cut the Body Loose is the fifth solo studio album by American hip-hop artist Astronautalis. It was released via SideOneDummy Records on May 13, 2016. Music videos were created for "Sike!", "Running Away from God", and "Kurt Cobain". In the week of April 22, 2016, Consequence of Sound placed "Attila Ambrus" at number 8 on the "Top 10 Songs of the Week" list.

== Track listing ==
No.	Title	Producer(s)	Length
1.	"Kurt Cobain"	Icetep	4:09
2.	"1515 Washington"	Amati; Icetep	3:25
3.	"Running Away from God"	Cecil Otter	3:08
4.	"Kudzu"	Steel Tipped Dove	3:41
5.	"Guard the Flame"	Lazerbeak	3:02
6.	"In the Tall Grass"	Steel Tipped Dove	3:17
7.	"Attila Ambrus"	Picnic Tyme	2:20
8.	"Forest Fire"	Red Velvet Beats	3:26
9.	"Cut the Body Loose"	Rickolus; John Congleton	3:49
10.	"Sike!"	Adam Pickrell	3:57
11.	"Boiled Peanuts" (featuring Lizzo)	Astronautalis	7:05
Total length:			41:19

== Personnel ==
Credits adapted from liner notes.

- Astronautalis – vocals, production (11)
- Adam Pickrell – synthesizer (1–8, 11), bass guitar (2–5, 7, 8), organ (6, 9, 11), keyboards (9), production (10), piano (11)
- Icetep – production (1, 2)
- Reggie Pace – horns (1, 3, 6–11)
- Bird Peterson – drum programming (1, 10)
- Amati – production (2)
- Cecil Otter – production (3)
- John Congleton – drum programming (3, 5, 7, 8), production (9), engineering, mixing
- Steel Tipped Dove – production (4, 6)
- Oscar Romero Jr. – vocals (5)
- Lazerbeak – production (5)
- Picnic Tyme – production (7)
- Mo McNichols – drums (8)
- Red Velvet Beats – production (8)
- Rickolus – production (9)
- Lizzo – vocals (11)
- Justin Vernon – executive production

== Charts ==
Chart	Peak position
US Alternative Albums (Billboard)	18
US Heatseekers Albums (Billboard)	3
US Independent Albums (Billboard)	19
US Top Rap Albums (Billboard)	10
US Vinyl Albums (Billboard)	19
