= That One =

That One may refer to:

- "That One", a 2005 single by Teedra Moses
- "That One", a song on the 2016 album Rocket Science by Rick Springfield
- "Thatone", a song on the album Ipecac Neat by rapper P.O.S.
