= Four Fists =

American hip-hop group

- Origin: Minneapolis, Minnesota, U.S.
- Genre: Hip-hop
- Years active: 2011–present
- Label: Doomtree Records
- Members: P.O.S; Astronautalis
- Website: fourfists.bandcamp.com

Four Fists is an American hip-hop group from Minneapolis, Minnesota. It consists of P.O.S and Astronautalis.

== History ==
P.O.S and Astronautalis first met on the Warped Tour in 2004. Subsequently, the two started working together in secret as Four Fists. The group's name derives from one of the short stories by F. Scott Fitzgerald. In the 2000s, the two appeared on each other's albums: Astronautalis' 2008 album Pomegranate ("The Story of My Life") and P.O.S's 2009 album Never Better ("Handmade Handgun").

In 2011, Four Fists made its debut live performance in Austin, Texas. In 2013, the duo released a single, "Mmmmmhmmmmm" b/w "Please Go", on Doomtree Records. The duo's first studio album, 6666, was released on Doomtree Records in 2018.

== Discography ==
=== Studio albums ===
- 6666 (2018)

=== Singles ===
- "Mmmmmhmmmmm" b/w "Please Go" (2013)
- "Nobody's Biz" b/w "G.D.F.R" (2018)
- "Dork Court" (2018)
- "6666" (2018)
