= Rebel Yellow =

Studio album by Cecil Otter of Doomtree

Studio album by Cecil Otter
- Released: August 26, 2008 (Doomtree Records; April 1, 2009 (Strange Famous Records)
- Genres: Hip-hop, alternative hip-hop
- Length: 40:52
- Labels: Doomtree Records, Strange Famous Records
- Producers: Cecil Otter, Kareel

Cecil Otter chronology
Cecil Otter's False Hopes (2005)	Rebel Yellow (2008)	Porcelain Revolver (TBA)

Professional ratings
Review scores
Source	Rating
AbsolutePunk	88%
RapReviews.com	8/10

Rebel Yellow is a studio album by Cecil Otter, a founding member of Minneapolis indie hip-hop collective Doomtree. Originally released on Doomtree Records in 2008, it was re-released on Strange Famous Records in 2009. Vita.mn placed the album at 8th on its list of the Best Local Albums of the 2000s.

== Music ==
Rebel Yellow is entirely produced by Cecil Otter, with contributions from Kareel. The album included one feature total from fellow Doomtree member P.O.S.

== Reception ==
Amoeba Music called the album "like hearing hip-hop channeled through a darker version of Doc Holliday, with the music and lyrics evoking mythical images of the Old West."

== Track listing ==
No.	Title	Producer(s)	Length
1.	"The Poet Is Rapist"	Cecil Otter	4:36
2.	"1999"	Cecil Otter, Kareel	4:03
3.	"Rebel Yellow"	Cecil Otter, Kareel	3:28
4.	"Sufficiently Breathless"	Cecil Otter	3:34
5.	"Box Car Diaries"	Cecil Otter	4:32
6.	"Down, Beast!"	Cecil Otter	4:34
7.	"Le Facteur"	Cecil Otter, Kareel	3:41
8.	"Match Book Diaries (Remix)"	Cecil Otter	3:19
9.	"Demon Girl"	Cecil Otter	1:58
10.	"Let Me Tell You"	Cecil Otter	4:08
11.	"Traveling Dunktank" (featuring P.O.S)	Cecil Otter	3:20
12.	"Black Rose"	Cecil Otter	3:23
13.	"Duel"	Cecil Otter	4:15

== Personnel ==
Credits adapted from liner notes.

- Cecil Otter – vocals, production
- Kareel – production (on 2, 3 and 7)
- James Lynch – electric bass (on 4)
- Sean McPherson – electric bass (on 8)
- Nate Collins – vocals (on 9), guitar (on 9)
- P.O.S – vocals (on 11)
- Dave Brockschmidt – guitar (on 13)
- Corey Stein – executive production
- Joe Mabbott – engineering
- Taylor Dees – painting
- Abe Coleman – lettering
- MK Larada – layout, photography
