= Cecil Otter's False Hopes =

Studio album by Cecil Otter
- Released: 2005
- Genres: Hip-hop, alternative hip-hop
- Length: 38:39
- Label: Doomtree Records
- Producers: Beautiful Bobby Gorgeous, Cecil Otter, Emily Bloodmobile, Lazerbeak, MK Larada

Cecil Otter chronology
Cecil Otter's False Hopes (2005)	Rebel Yellow (2008)

Professional ratings
Review scores
Source	Rating
RapReviews	7/10

Cecil Otter's False Hopes is the first official release from Cecil Otter, a founding member of Minneapolis indie hip-hop collective Doomtree. It is one of False Hopes albums released by Doomtree Records.

== Track listing ==
No.	Title	Producer	Length
1.	"Atreyu and the Swamps of Sadness"	Cecil Otter	2:55
2.	"City Girl (Amuse-Meant-to-Get-Her)"	Cecil Otter	2:10
3.	"Tin Man Purrs Like a Kitten"	Cecil Otter	3:56
4.	"Chicken or the Egg"	Emily Bloodmobile	3:10
5.	"Blacklist"	Beautiful Bobby Gorgeous	3:37
6.	"Travis Bickles' Once Over"	Beautiful Bobby Gorgeous	2:09
7.	"Old Fashioned House"	Cecil Otter	2:31
8.	"Mom Song"	Cecil Otter	2:42
9.	"Matchbook Diaries"	Lazerbeak	4:15
10.	"Lakeshore Drifter"	MK Larada	2:43
11.	"...Good for Once / Lakeshore Drifter (Live Version)"	Cecil Otter	8:31

== Personnel ==
Credits adapted from liner notes.

- Beautiful Bobby Gorgeous - production (4, 5)
- Cecil Otter - vocals, production (1–3, 7, 8, 11), recorded by, mixed by, mastered by
- Charlie Puleston - guitar (2)
- Emily Bloodmobile - production (4)
- Lazerbeak - production (9)
- MK Larada - production (10), design, layout
- Paper Tiger - scratches (5)
- Sean McPherson - bass (9)
- Turbo Nemesis - scratches (3, 7), recorded by, mixed by, mastered by
