= Chill, Dummy =

Studio album by P.O.S
- Released: January 27, 2017
- Genre: Hip-hop
- Length: 45:20
- Label: Doomtree Records
- Producers: P.O.S; Lazerbeak; Makr; Cory Grindberg; Ryan Olson

P.O.S chronology
We Don't Even Live Here (2013)	Chill, Dummy (2017)

Chill, Dummy (often stylized as Chill, dummy) is the fifth solo studio album by American rapper P.O.S. It was released on Doomtree Records on January 27, 2017. Guest appearances include Busdriver, Astronautalis, Open Mike Eagle, and Justin Vernon, among others. It peaked at number 16 on the Billboard Independent Albums chart.

== Production ==
The album is produced by Lazerbeak, Makr, Cory Grindberg, Ryan Olson, and P.O.S himself. It also features Moncelas Boston, Rapper Hooks, Justin Vernon, Lady Midnight, Busdriver, Dwynell Roland, Gerald, Manchita, Open Mike Eagle, Angelenah, Allan Kingdom, Astronautalis, Eric Mayson, Hard_R (P.O.S's son), Kathleen Hanna, Lizzo, Lydia Liza, and Nicholas L. Perez.

== Critical reception ==
Professional ratings
Aggregate scores
Source	Rating
Metacritic	83/100
Review scores
Source	Rating
The A.V. Club	B+
Pitchfork	7.4/10
PopMatters	8/10 stars
SLUG Magazine	favorable

At Metacritic, which assigns a weighted average score out of 100 to reviews from mainstream critics, the album received an average score of 83, based on 4 reviews, indicating "universal acclaim".

ABC News placed it at number 26 on the "50 Best Albums of 2017" list.

== In popular culture ==
"Born a Snake" was used in a promotional video for Marvel's Black Panther: A Nation Under Our Feet: Part 9.

"Gravedigger" was used in EA's racing game Need for Speed Payback.

== Track listing ==
No.	Title	Producer(s)	Length
1.	"Born a Snake"	P.O.S	2:32
2.	"Wearing a Bear"	Lazerbeak	2:41
3.	"Bully" (featuring Moncelas Boston and Rapper Hooks)	Makr	3:29
4.	"Faded" (featuring Justin Vernon and Lady Midnight)	P.O.S	3:51
5.	"Pieces/Ruins" (featuring Busdriver and Dwynell Roland)	Cory Grindberg	5:21
6.	"Get Ate" (featuring Gerald)	P.O.S	1:25
7.	"Roddy Piper" (featuring Moncelas Boston)	Lazerbeak; Ryan Olson	4:20
8.	"Thieves/Kings"	Cory Grindberg	2:44
9.	"Infinite Scroll" (featuring Manchita and Open Mike Eagle)	Cory Grindberg	4:02
10.	"Lanes"	P.O.S	1:50
11.	"Gravedigger" (featuring Angelenah)	Cory Grindberg	4:17
12.	"Sleepdrone/Superposition" (featuring Allan Kingdom, Astronautalis, Eric Mayson, Hard_R, Kathleen Hanna, Lizzo, Lydia Liza, and Nicholas L. Perez)	P.O.S	8:48

== Personnel ==
Credits adapted from liner notes.

- P.O.S – vocals, production (4, 6, 10, 12), recording
- Jeremy Ylvisaker – guitar (1)
- Gerald – vocals (1, 6)
- Lazerbeak – production (2, 7), executive production
- Moncelas Boston – vocals (3, 7)
- Rapper Hooks – vocals (3)
- Makr – production (3)
- Lady Midnight – vocals (4, 8, 9, 11)
- Dwynell Roland – vocals (5)
- Busdriver – vocals (5)
- Cory Grindberg – production (5, 8, 9, 11)
- Ryan Olson – production (7)
- Open Mike Eagle – vocals (9)
- Manchita – vocals (9)
- James Buckley – bass guitar (9, 11)
- Angelenah – vocals (11)
- DJ Abilities – turntables (11)
- Hard_R – vocals (12)
- Allan Kingdom – vocals (12)
- Astronautalis – vocals (12)
- Kathleen Hanna – vocals (12)
- Lizzo – vocals (12)
- Eric Mayson – vocals (12)
- Lydia Liza – vocals (12)
- Nicholas L. Perez – vocals (12)
- Joe Mabbott – drums (12), engineering, recording, mixing
- BJ Burton – recording (2), mixing (2)
- Bruce Templeton – mastering
- Brian Hart – photography, design
- Crystal Quinn – text

== Charts ==
Chart	Peak position
US Independent Albums (Billboard)	16
