= We Don't Even Live Here =

Studio album by P.O.S
- Released: October 23, 2012
- Genre: Hip-hop
- Length: 39:40
- Label: Rhymesayers Entertainment
- Producers: P.O.S; Lazerbeak; Andrew Dawson; Cecil Otter; Patric Russell; Ryan Olson; Boys Noize; Housemeister

P.O.S chronology
Never Better (2009)	We Don't Even Live Here (2012)	Chill, Dummy (2017)

We Don't Even Live Here is the fourth solo studio album by American rapper P.O.S. It was released on Rhymesayers Entertainment on October 23, 2012. It peaked at number 47 on the Billboard 200 chart.

== Release ==
Preorders of the album came complete with materials from anarchist collective Crimethinc.

== Critical reception ==
Professional ratings
Aggregate scores
Source	Rating
Metacritic	76/100
Review scores
Source	Rating
Alarm	favorable
AllMusic	4/5 stars
The A.V. Club	A−
BBC	favorable
The Current	favorable
Pitchfork	5.7/10
XXL	L

At Metacritic, which assigns a weighted average score out of 100 to reviews from mainstream critics, the album received an average score of 76, based on 14 reviews, indicating "generally favorable reviews".

Genevieve Koski of The A.V. Club gave the album a grade of A−, writing, "We Don't Even Live Here is extraordinarily accessible and somehow even agreeable in its controlled rage, the soundtrack to an anarchic end-of-the-world party that listeners can only hope they’re outsider enough to attend." David Jeffries of AllMusic gave the album 4 out of 5 stars, describing it as "a literate, sharp blast of revolution with an anarchist slant."

ABC News placed it at number 24 on the "50 Best Albums of 2012" list.

== Track listing ==
No.	Title	Producer(s)	Length
1.	"Bumper"	P.O.S	2:59
2.	"Fuck Your Stuff"	Lazerbeak	3:53
3.	"How We Land" (featuring Justin Vernon of Bon Iver)	Andrew Dawson; P.O.S	4:00
4.	"Wanted Wasted" (featuring Astronautalis)	Cecil Otter	4:20
5.	"They Can't Come" (featuring Sims)	Lazerbeak	4:01
6.	"Lockpicks, Knives, Bricks and Bats"	Lazerbeak; Andrew Dawson	3:48
7.	"Fire in the Hole / Arrow to the Action"	Lazerbeak	3:48
8.	"Get Down" (featuring Mike Mictlan)	Patrick Russel	3:40
9.	"All of It"	Ryan Olson; 2% Muck	3:11
10.	"Weird Friends (We Don't Even Live Here)"	Boys Noize; Housemeister	2:48
11.	"Piano Hits" (featuring Isaac Gale of Marijuana Deathsquads)	Cecil Otter	3:12

Deluxe edition bonus tracks
No.	Title	Producer(s)	Length
12.	"Oh, Ouch" (featuring Busdriver)	P.O.S	3:20
13.	"Sick Pout"	Cecil Otter	2:21

== Personnel ==
Credits adapted from liner notes.

- P.O.S – vocals, production (1, 3, 12), photography
- Ben Ivascu – drums (1, 2, 3, 7, 11)
- Lazerbeak – production (2, 5, 6, 7)
- Chris "Sick Boy" Lee – drums (2, 6, 7, 11)
- Andrew Dawson – production (3, 6), recording, mixing
- Justin Vernon – vocals (3)
- Astronautalis – vocals (3, 4), photography
- Justin Pierre – vocals (3, 6)
- Jessy Greene – violin (4)
- Cecil Otter – production (4, 11, 13)
- Sims – vocals (5)
- Patric Russel – production (8)
- Mike Mictlan – vocals (8)
- Ryan Olson – production (9)
- 2% Muck – tweak (9)
- Boys Noize – production (10)
- Housemeister – production (10)
- Manchita – vocals (10)
- Isaac Gale – vocals (11)
- Busdriver – vocals (12)
- Max Plisskin – mixing assistance
- Chris Athens – mastering
- Eric Timothy Carlson – artwork, design
- Isaak Gale – photography
- Kelly Loverud – photography
- Weather Grider – photography
- John Grider – photography
- J. Cook – project coordination
- S. Rossi – project coordination
- S. Alexander – executive production
- S. Daley – executive production
- B. Sayers – executive production

== Charts ==
Chart	Peak position
US Billboard 200	47
US Top R&B/Hip-Hop Albums (Billboard)	9
US Top Rap Albums (Billboard)	8
US Independent Albums (Billboard)	9
US Indie Store Album Sales (Billboard)	8
