= Lava Bangers =

Studio album by Lazerbeak
- Released: January 24, 2012
- Genre: Instrumental hip-hop
- Length: 38:59
- Label: Doomtree Records
- Producer: Lazerbeak

Lazerbeak chronology
Legend Recognize Legend (2010)	Lava Bangers (2012)	Luther (2018)

Professional ratings
Review scores
Source	Rating
PopMatters	7/10
Reviler	79/100
Syffal	10/10

Lava Bangers is the second studio album by American hip-hop producer Lazerbeak, a member of Minneapolis indie hip-hop collective Doomtree.

== Release ==
The album was released January 24, 2012, on Doomtree Records, and features scratches from DJ Plain Ole Bill.

== Producer ==
The album was fully produced by Lazerbeak.

== Video ==
The song "Lift Every Voice" was released with a music video via Doomtree's YouTube page.

== Track listing ==
No.	Title	Length
1.	"Mighty Jungle"	2:19
2.	"Walk It Out"	1:35
3.	"Smash Hit"	2:08
4.	"LRL"	2:09
5.	"Bully"	1:58
6.	"Ay Bay Bee"	1:23
7.	"Like That"	2:28
8.	"Xylophone"	2:25
9.	"Had Enough"	1:47
10.	"Sweat Set"	1:39
11.	"Finally Back"	1:47
12.	"Cement Blocks"	2:37
13.	"Knight Fighter"	1:15
14.	"Ghostdust"	1:57
15.	"Buffalo Plaid"	1:34
16.	"Eleventh Hour"	1:12
17.	"Thimble Man"	1:33
18.	"Shronked Up"	1:44
19.	"Cloud Crawl"	2:16
20.	"Lift Every Voice"	3:01
