= Botzy =

American rapper

BOTZY
- Origin: Minneapolis, Minnesota
- Genres: Underground hip hop
- Occupation: Rapper
- Years active: 2011-present
- Label: Unsigned
- Website: www.botzy.wtf

Adam Botsford, better known by his stage name Botzy, is a rapper based out of Minneapolis, Minnesota. He is a former member of Culture Cry Wolf and VAYNS.

== Career ==
BOTZY's work on The Best Love Is Free event and compilation CD has had a significant impact on the Minneapolis music scene, lasting five years with repeated increasing turns outs.

His video for "Couldn't Breathe (feat. Lizzo)" was premiered on URB, and was labeled a "throwback kind of affair". His album Buck Fotzy was distributed by Fake Four Inc. on July 9, 2013.

BOTZY quickly followed up "Buck Fotzy" with a 6 track EP titled "Past Tense", as a gift to his fans for their recent support.

BOTZY released a collaborative EP with MunQs under the group name "VAYNS". They played their first and only live show at First Avenue Mainroom as a part of The Best Love is Free 5.

After a hiatus, BOTZY announced a new project, Sorry, Where Was I?. The album touches on themes of redemption, growth, and what it means to rebuild yourself through love and intention. The single "Look At You (Affirmations)" was paired with a music video and referred to as "a loving tribute to love, light, and radical self-belief".

BOTZY collaborated with LaRussell on the song "Head In The Clouds" which was well received due to a message about persistence and renewal.

A music video for "Good For Me" was premiered by PitchFork, mentioning that "The track strikes a chord with listeners who connect with its message of appreciation and redemption."

BOTZY's single "Hurry Up and Wait" dropped with a music video, premiered by Rolling Stone UK and referred to as "a restless equilibrium between patience and growth" and "a Return to Raw Energy".

== Discography ==
=== Albums ===
- Deaf to the Static (2010)
- Buck Fotzy (Fake Four Inc., 2013)
- Still Not Dead Yet (Polkadot Mayhem, 2015)

=== Mixtapes ===
- My Friends and I (2011)
- I'll Be Underground When I'm Dead (Vol. 1) (2014)

=== EPs ===
- Botzy's Birthday EP (2012)
- Past Tense (2013)
- £¡bel (2014)
