= More Than Ever (Sims album) =

Studio album by Sims
- Released: November 4, 2016
- Genres: Hip-hop, alternative hip-hop
- Length: 45:31
- Label: Doomtree Records
- Producers: Icetep, Paper Tiger, Lazerbeak

Sims chronology
Bad Time Zoo (2011)	More Than Ever (2016)

Professional ratings
Review scores
Source	Rating
RapReviews	8/10
Scene Point Blank	7.3/10

More Than Ever is the third studio album by American hip-hop artist Sims, a member of Minneapolis hip-hop collective Doomtree. It was released on Doomtree Records on November 4, 2016.

The album was produced by Icetep of Minneapolis hip-hop group Killstreak and Doomtree producers Paper Tiger and Lazerbeak.

== Critical reception ==
RapReviews' Steve Juon called the album "witty and satirical" and said that "while Sims is clearly inclined to march to the beat of his own drum, he’s not in completely inaccessible arthouse territory." Scene Point Blank called More Than Ever "a record that pushes expectation beyond the hard-hitting beats and spitfire lyricism with echo-y and dreamlike tracks interjected through the more traditional beat-heavy songs."

== Track listing ==
No.	Title	Producer	Length
1.	"A Bad Flying Bird"	Paper Tiger	3:41
2.	"Icarus"	Paper Tiger	2:36
3.	"Brutal Dance"	Icetep	3:31
4.	"OneHundred"	Lazerbeak	3:55
5.	"Flash Paper"	Paper Tiger	3:43
6.	"Spinning Away"	Icetep	3:25
7.	"Oakland Ave Catalpas"	Icetep, Lazerbeak	4:13
8.	"What They Don't Know"	Icetep	2:37
9.	"Badlands"	Lazerbeak	2:21
10.	"Buckets"	Lazerbeak	3:18
11.	"Shaking in My Sheets"	Icetep, Lazerbeak	2:37
12.	"Voltaire"	Icetep	5:25
13.	"Gosper Island"	Paper Tiger	4:09

== Personnel ==
Adapted from the album's Bandcamp page.

- Joe Mabbott – mixing
- Bruce Templeton – mastering
- Lazerbeak – executive producer
- Andy Lund – artwork

== Charts ==
Chart	Peak position
US Heatseekers Albums (Billboard)	18
US Independent Albums (Billboard)	48
US Top R&B/Hip-Hop Albums (Billboard)	34
US Rap Albums (Billboard)	21
