= Legend Recognize Legend =

Studio album by Lazerbeak
- Released: September 28, 2010
- Genres: Alternative hip-hop, indie rock
- Length: 33:59
- Label: Doomtree Records
- Producer: Lazerbeak

Lazerbeak chronology
Legend Recognize Legend (2010)	Lava Bangers (2012)

Legend Recognize Legend is the first studio album by American hip-hop musician Lazerbeak. It was released on Doomtree Records in 2010.

== Critical reception ==
Professional ratings
Review scores
Source	Rating
Alternative Press	3.5/5 stars
Pitchfork	7.2/10
Potholes in My Blog	4/5 stars

Ali Elabbady of Potholes in My Blog critiqued that the record captures the muscality of Lazerbeak's previous groups, concluding that: "This is what gives Legend Recognize Legend its title. No one personality wins, its more of a win-win on both sides. Hopefully Lazerbeak's next endeavors are as equally entertaining." Pitchfork contributor Nate Patrin gave notice of Lazerbeak leaning towards indie pop throughout the album, highlighting "its pop-song structure and [its] sample-based construction" through a raspy delivery of "North Woods conceptualism" in the lyrics. While finding the experimentation haphazard at points, Patrin called it "a compelling pop thrill," saying "if you're interested in finding out just what a scene without borders is capable of coming up with, Legend Recognize Legend is worth the initial disorientation." Eddie Fleischer of Alternative Press was also mixed on Lazerbeak's vocal performance over his newfound pop music landscape, but concluded that: "If he gets tired of being behind the scenes in underground rap, Legend is a great first step towards a career as an indie-pop star."

== Track listing ==
No.	Title	Length
1.	"Dream Team"	3:20
2.	"Land's End"	4:09
3.	"Let It Go"	3:14
4.	"Bound"	3:58
5.	"Wild Life"	2:10
6.	"Salt and Sea"	4:01
7.	"Pearly Gates"	3:09
8.	"Cannon Falls"	3:06
9.	"Tempest"	3:50
10.	"Foothills"	3:02
