= Marijuana Deathsquads =

American music group

- Origin: Minneapolis, Minnesota, U.S.
- Genres: Electronic; noise; improvisation; experimental
- Years active: 2009–present
- Label: Totally Gross National Product
- Members: Ryan Olson; Isaac Gale; Stef Alexander; Ben Ivascu; Mark McGee; Jeremy Nutzman
- Website: marijuanadeathsquads.com

Marijuana Deathsquads is an American music group based in Minneapolis, Minnesota. The group's sound has been described by City Pages as "ear-bending improv/dance grooves that defied listener expectations and spit in the face of easy categorization." NPR described the group as "a thrilling, relentless bombardment of sight and sound."

== History ==
Formed in 2009, the band consists of Ryan Olson of Poliça and Gayngs, Isaac Gale, Stef Alexander (a.k.a. P.O.S), Ben Ivascu of Poliça, Mark McGee of To Kill a Petty Bourgeoisie, and Jeremy Nutzman (a.k.a. Velvet Negroni). Frequent collaborators include Channy Leaneagh and Drew Christopherson of Poliça, Har Mar Superstar, and Jim Eno.

In 2011, the group released its first studio album, Crazy Master. In 2011, singer Isaac Gale won the City Pages Best Male Vocalist award, his singing described as "a poltergeist creeping out of a snowy, crackling television screen, Gale's tortured, throaty hollering is the stuff of zombie nightmares, simultaneously gut-wrenching and enthralling."

In 2012, the group released the Tamper Disable Destroy mixtape.

In 2013, the group released Music Rocks I & II, two EPs featuring Ryan Olson, Isaac Gale, Jason Power, Ben Ivascu, Channy Leaneagh, Mark McGee, Jeremy Nutzman, Stefon Alexander, and Madden.

In that year, the group released Oh My Sexy Lord, a studio album that Spin called "ferocious" and described as fusing "jagged grooves, scratchy analog effects, and robo-warped vocals into a full-length, experimental freakout." The album features guest appearances from Bon Iver frontman Justin Vernon, Poliça frontwoman Channy Leaneagh, and Har Mar Superstar.

In 2016, the group contributed a cover of the song "Truckin'" to Day of the Dead, a Grateful Dead tribute album.

In 2018, the group released Tuff Guy Electronics, which was recorded at Pioneer Works (Brooklyn) and Funkhaus (Berlin).

== Style and influences ==
Chris Reiemenschneider of Star Tribune stated that "Marijuana Deathsquads has been steadily blowing eardrums, breaking drum heads and tearing at the seams of conventional music-making since its semi-mysterious inception."

== Discography ==
=== Studio albums ===
- Crazy Master (2011)
- Oh My Sexy Lord (2013)
- Tuff Guy Electronics (2018)
- MDS Sports (2024)

=== Mixtapes ===
- Tamper Disable Destroy (2012)

=== EPs ===
- Music Rocks I & II (2013)

=== Singles ===
- "The River" (2013)
- "The World Beyond" (2019)
