= Astronautalis =

American hip-hop artist

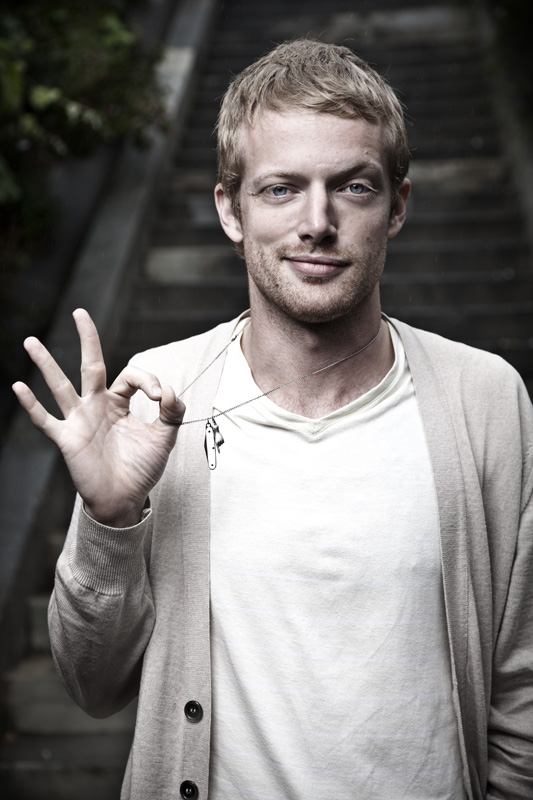

Background information
- Also known as: Andy Bothwell
- Born: Charles Andrew Bothwell; December 13, 1981 (age 44)
- Origin: Jacksonville, Florida
- Genres: Hip-hop; alternative hip-hop; indie rock
- Occupations: Rapper; producer
- Years active: 2003–2020
- Labels: SideOneDummy; Fake Four Inc.; Eyeball Records; Fighting Records; Limited Fanfare Records
- Website: astronautalis.com

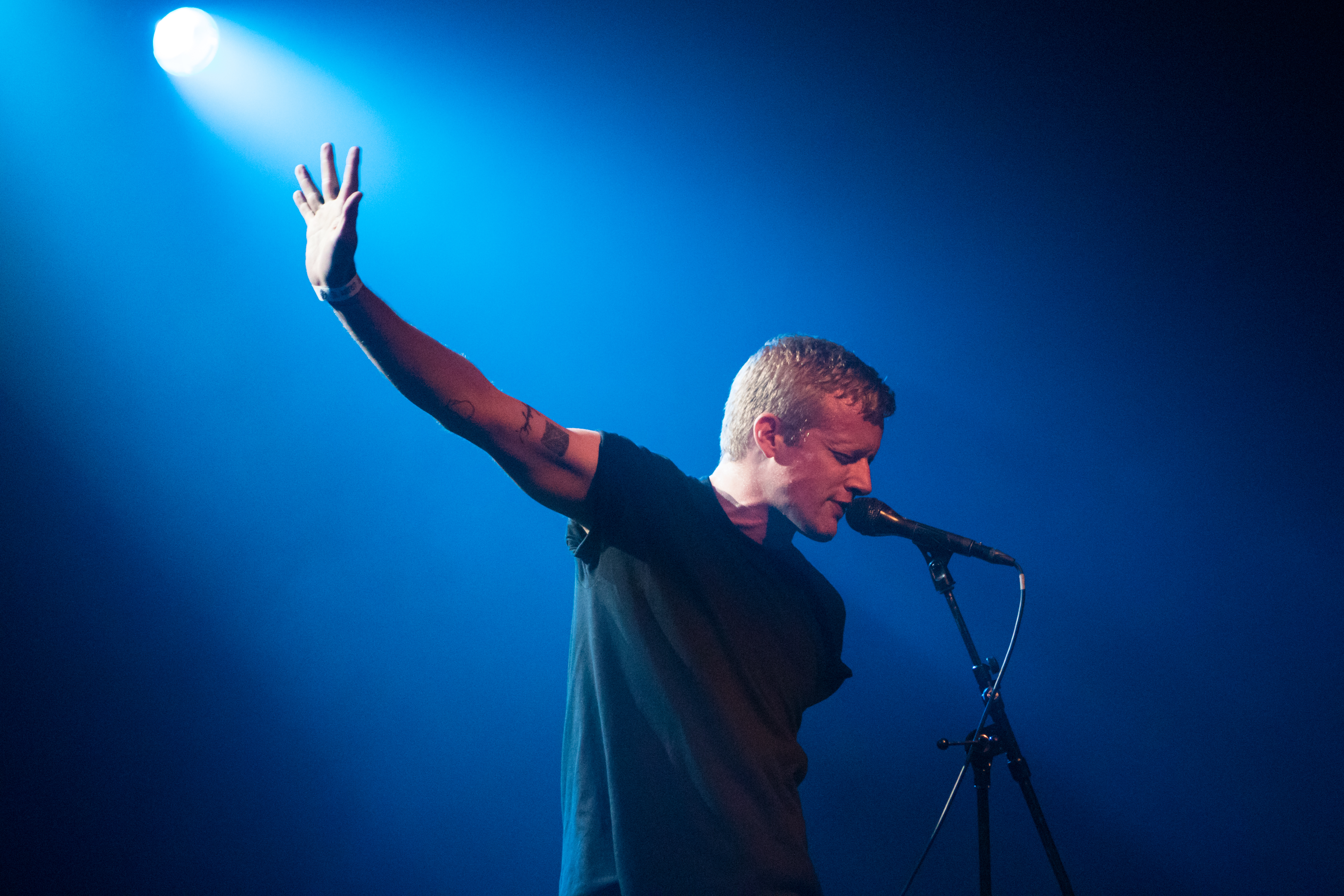
Astronautalis at the WayBackWhen Festival 2017

Charles Andrew Bothwell (born December 13, 1981), better known by his stage name Astronautalis, is an American alternative hip-hop artist currently based in Brooklyn, New York.

== History ==
After gaining some recognition in local circles in Jacksonville, Florida and competing at Scribble Jam, Astronautalis self-released his debut album, You and Yer Good Ideas, in 2003. He eventually signed with Fighting Records and the record was re-released in 2005, followed by his second album, The Mighty Ocean and Nine Dark Theaters, in 2006. He released the third album, Pomegranate, on Eyeball Records in 2008. In winter 2009, he toured with the Canadian indie rock band Tegan and Sara through Europe, and supported them again through the spring of 2010 in Australia. His fourth album, This Is Our Science, was released on Fake Four Inc. in 2011. His latest release, Cut the Body Loose, was released in 2016.

Astronautalis is a descendant of James Hepburn, 4th Earl of Bothwell, which is one of the reasons why his lyrics often deal with historical fiction.

== Style ==
Astronautalis has been described as "if Beck were a decade or so younger and had grown up more heavily immersed in hip-hop," with his rapping style noted for "blending styles of indie rock, electro, and talkin’ blues" with hip-hop. He has described himself as "historical fiction hip-hop."

During live performances, Astronautalis often performs a freestyle rap based on topics chosen by members of his audience.

== Controversies ==
In June 2020 Astronautalis was accused of sexual assault and physical abuse by a number of accounts on Instagram and Twitter. Astronautalis released a response admitting to this abuse and has since deleted all of his tweets and made his account private.

== Discography ==
=== Studio albums ===
- You and Yer Good Ideas (self-released, 2003; Fighting, 2005)
- The Mighty Ocean & Nine Dark Theaters (Fighting, 2006)
- Pomegranate (Eyeball, 2008)
- This Is Our Science (Fake Four Inc., 2011)
- Cut the Body Loose (SideOneDummy, 2016)

=== Collaborative albums ===
- 6666 (with P.O.S, as Four Fists) (2018)
- De Oro (Totally Gross National Product, 2014) (with S. Carey, Ryan Olson & Justin Vernon, as Jason Feathers)

=== Mixtapes ===
- Dancehall Horn Sound!! (2010) (with DJ Fishr Pryce)

=== EPs ===
- Meet Me Here (2004)
- Texas Kinda Rhymes With Sexist (2005)
- A Round Trip Ticket to China (2006)
- Split EP (2006) (with Babel Fishh)
- Gold Bones (2007)
- Dang! Seven Freestyles in Seven Days (2008)
- The Unfortunate Affairs of Mary and Earl (2008)
- The Young Capitalist's Starter Kit (2008)
- Daytrotter Sessions (2011)
- This City Ain't Just a Skyline (2013)
- SIKE! (2016)

=== Singles ===
- "This Is the Place" (2013) (with Sims)
- "The Rainmakers" b/w "Fallen Streets" (2013) (with Rickolus)
- "MMMMMHMMMMM" b/w "Please Go" (2013) (with P.O.S, as Four Fists)
- "The Dirt Bike" (2017)
- "Sick" (2017)
- "These Songs" (2017)
- "Bella Ciao" (2020)

=== Vinyl releases ===
- You and Yer Good Ideas (2003) [Dual 12' Vinyl: Black]
- Split Series Vol. 2 (2006) (with BabelFishh]) [12' Vinyl: 500 Black]
- Pomegranate (2008) [12' Vinyl: Black, Ltd: White]
- This Is Our Science (2011) [12' Vinyl: Black]
- Astronautalis & Rickolus (2013) (with Rickolus) [1st Pressing: 100 Mixed Color (Hand-Numbered), 150 Red, 150 White, 250 Black; 2nd Pressing: 175 Lavender, 175 Blue]
- Four Fists (2013) (with P.O.S) [500 Clear, 500 Red, 500 White, 500 Blue]
- Double Exposure Vol 3. (2013) (with Chuck Ragan) [100 Blue, 200 White, 300 Red, 400 Black]
- The Mighty Ocean & Nine Dark Theaters (2015) [Dual 12' Vinyl: 500 Swirled blue/white/clear]

=== Guest appearances and production credits ===
Guest appearances

- Scott Da Ros – "They Made Me Do It" (2005)
- Brzowski – "Roll My Bones" from Maryshelleyoverdrive (2005)
- Input – "Now and Never More" from Elusive Candor (2006)
- Noah23 – "They Made Me Do It" from Cameo Therapy (2007)
- P.O.S – "Hand Made Hand Gun" from Never Better (2009)
- Otem Rellik – "Warm Pockets" from Chain Reaction Robot (2008)
- Oskar Ohlson – "Sea of Grass" from Honk, Bang, Whistle and Crash (2008)
- Sole and the Skyrider Band – "A Sad Day for Investors" from Sole and the Skyrider Band Remix LP (2009)
- Sole – "Swagger Like Us" & "Juicy" from Nuclear Winter Volume 1 (2009)
- Ceschi – "No New York" from The One Man Band Broke Up (2010)
- Zoën – "Be Careful What You Wish For" from One Night Between (2010)
- Mild Davis – "Prince of Mayport" from Bro-Sesh: Volume 1 (2010)
- Andrre – "Learn to Listen" and "Keeping Memory Alive" from Learn to Love (2011)
- The Hood Internet – "Our Finest China" from FEAT (2012)
- Bleubird – "Hello Hollow" from Cannonball!!! (2012)
- Marijuana Deathsquads – "Top Down" from Tamper Disable Destroy (2012)
- P.O.S – "Wanted Wasted" from We Don't Even Live Here (2012)
- Input & Broken – "When Darkness Looms" from Never Heard of Ya (2012)
- Myka 9 & Factor Chandelier – "Bask In These Rays" from Sovereign Soul (2012)
- Culture Cry Wolf – "That's the Breaks" from The Sapient Sessions EP (2013)
- Factor – "Let It Go" from Woke Up Alone (2013)
- Sadistik – "Exit Theme" from Flowers for My Father (2013)
- Giant Gorilla Dog Thing – "Bandaids Over Bulletholes" from Horse (2014)
- Noize MC – "Hard Reboot" from Hard Reboot (2014)
- P.O.S. – "Sleepdrone/Superposition" from "Chill, dummy" (2017)
- Factor Chandelier – "Scratch-Off Lotto Tickets" from "Wisdom Teeth" (2018)
- Ceschi – "Any War" from "Sad, Fat Luck" (2019)
- Hurricane Party – "Kon@" from "Juice" (2019)

Production credits

- Bleubird – Cannonball!!! (2012)

== Videography ==
- Trouble Hunters (2009)
- The Wondersmith and His Sons (2010)
- Contrails (2011)
- This Is Our Science (2012)
- Dimitri Mendeleev (2013)
- SIKE! (2016)
- Running Away From God (2016)
- Kurt Cobain (2016)
- Forest Fire (2017)
