= P.O.S (rapper) =

American rapper

- P.O.S performing in 2009

Background information
- Also known as: P.O.S.; Emily Bloodmobile; LeRon
- Born: Stefon Leron Alexander; August 18, 1981 (age 45); Minneapolis, Minnesota, U.S.
- Genres: Hip-hop; hardcore punk
- Occupations: Rapper; multi-instrumentalist; singer; record producer
- Instruments: Sampler; guitar; bass guitar; keyboards; drums
- Years active: 2001–current
- Labels: Doomtree Records; Rhymesayers Entertainment
- Website: www.doomtree.net/pos/

Stefon Leron Alexander (born August 18, 1981), better known by his stage name P.O.S, is an American hip-hop artist from Minneapolis. He has been a member of groups such as Doomtree, Building Better Bombs, Gayngs, Marijuana Deathsquads, Cenospecies, Four Fists, and Shredders.

== Career ==
=== Early career ===
Before entering hip-hop, P.O.S performed in punk-rock bands Degenerates and Om.

In 2001, P.O.S, rapper Syst, and DJ Anomaly formed the short-lived hip-hop group Cenospecies. The group released a studio album, Indefinition, in 2002. The group won the tongue-in-cheek award "Best Band to Break Up in the Past 12 Months" in the year-end issue of City Pages.

=== Doomtree ===
In 2001, P.O.S and MK Larada formed the hip-hop collective Doomtree. The group has released three studio albums: Doomtree (2008), No Kings (2011), and All Hands (2015).

=== Solo projects ===
P.O.S released his debut solo studio album, Ipecac Neat, on Doomtree Records in 2004. His second studio album, Audition, was released on Rhymesayers Entertainment in 2006.

In 2009, P.O.S released his third studio album, Never Better, on Rhymesayers Entertainment. It peaked at number 106 on the Billboard 200 chart.

His fourth studio album, We Don't Even Live Here, was released on Rhymesayers Entertainment in 2012. It peaked at number 47 on the Billboard 200 chart. A version of the album remixed by Marijuana Deathsquads, titled WDELH/MDS/RMX, was released a year later.

In 2017, P.O.S released his fifth studio album, Chill, Dummy, on Doomtree Records.

=== Side projects ===
P.O.S is a vocalist and guitarist in the punk band Building Better Bombs. The group released a studio album, Freak Out Squares, on Init Records in 2007.

He is a member of Minneapolis indie supergroup Gayngs. The group's first studio album, Relayted, was released on Jagjaguwar in 2010.

Marijuana Deathsquads was formed after Building Better Bombs went on hiatus. Consisting of rotating members, the group released the first studio album, Crazy Master, in 2011.

P.O.S is also a member of hardcore punk band Wharf Rats along with Chris 2, Chachi Darin, and Wade MacNeil.

He is one half of Four Fists along with Astronautalis. The duo's first studio album, titled 6666, was released in 2018.

He is a member of Shredders along with Sims, Lazerbeak, and Paper Tiger. The group has released two studio albums: Dangerous Jumps (2017) and Great Hits (2019).

=== Style and influences ===
In a 2010 interview with Punknews.org, P.O.S listed Minor Threat, Operation Ivy, Black Flag, Rancid, Metallica, and Michael Jackson as some of the first musicians he loved. Hip-hop-wise, he cited Mos Def, Company Flow, Atmosphere, and Aesop Rock as important influences.

=== Recognition ===
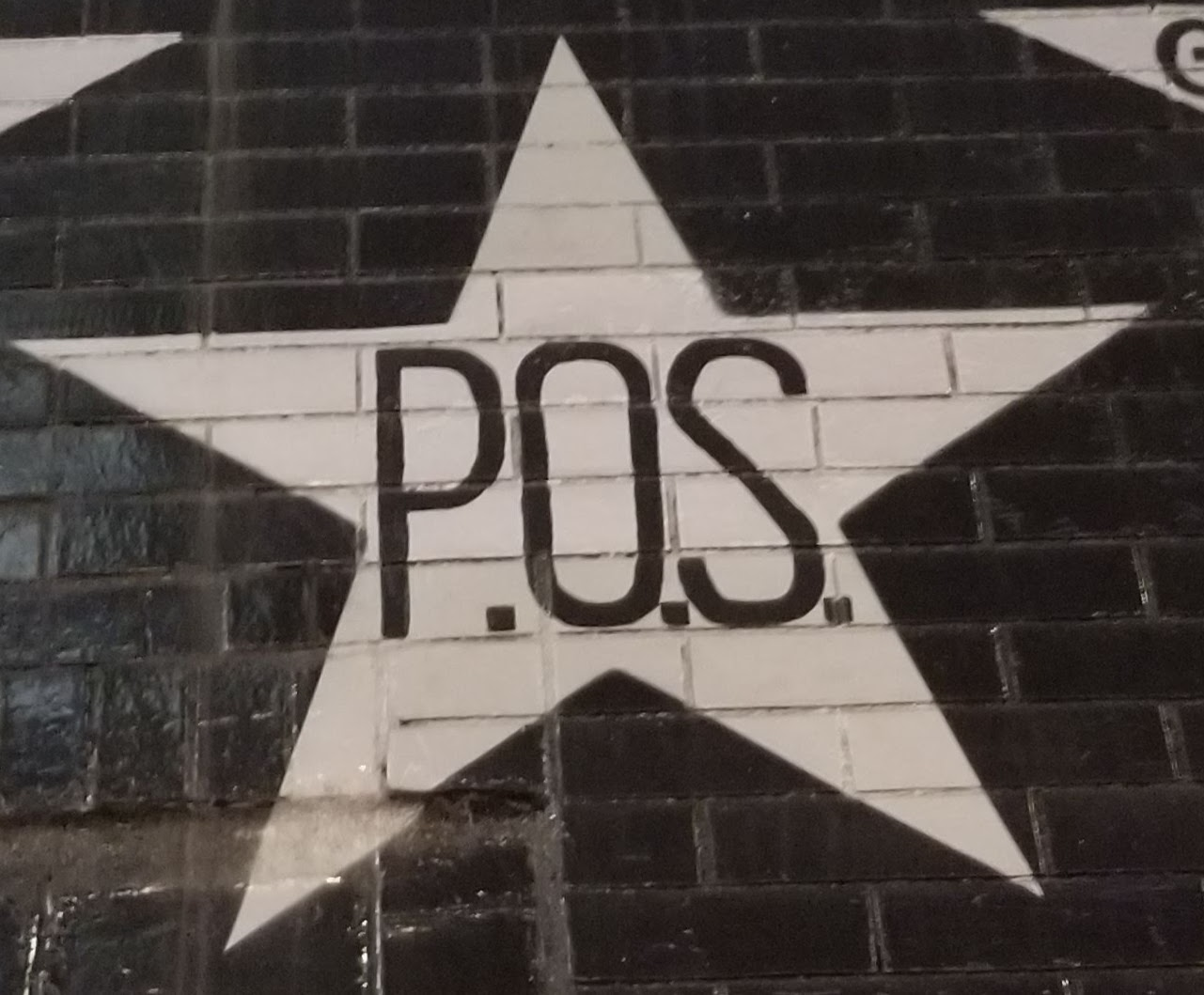
P.O.S's star on the outside mural of the Minneapolis nightclub First Avenue, 2020.

P.O.S has been honored with two stars on the outside mural of the Minneapolis nightclub First Avenue, recognizing performers that have played sold-out shows or have otherwise demonstrated a major contribution to the culture at the venue. P.O.S has one star for his solo work, and the Doomtree collective also has one.

== Personal life ==
P.O.S was born in Minneapolis, Minnesota. He attended Hopkins High School, though he did not reside in Hopkins.

In 2012, P.O.S had to cancel his national tour due to health concerns. In a video posted to YouTube, P.O.S said failing kidneys were to blame for the cancelation, saying: "Everyone keeps telling me, including my doctors, that I have to take care of my health first." In 2014, he received a kidney transplant.

=== Emotional abuse allegations and hiatus ===
In June 2020, P.O.S released a statement regarding allegations of abuse by his touring DJ. In response to this, multiple women came forward accusing P.O.S himself of a history of manipulation and emotional abuse. In July 2020, P.O.S responded to these allegations and announced that he was stepping away from music.

== Discography ==
=== Studio albums ===
- Indefinition (2002) (with Syst and DJ Anomaly, as Cenospecies)
- Ipecac Neat (2004)
- Audition (2006)
- Freak Out Squares (2007) (with Ryan Olson, et al., as Building Better Bombs)
- Never Better (2009)
- We Don't Even Live Here (2012)
- Chill, Dummy (2017)
- Dangerous Jumps (2017)
- 6666 (2018)

=== Remix albums ===
- WDELH/MDS/RMX (2013)

=== EPs ===
- Falsehopes (2002) (with Cecil Otter)
- False Hopes Mega! (2003) (with Cecil Otter)
- This Is a Gang. All We Need Is a Name (2006) (with Ryan Olson, et al., as Building Better Bombs)
- Wharf Rats (2011) (with Chris 2, Wade MacNeil, and Chachi Darin, as Wharf Rats)

=== Singles ===
- "Half Cocked Concepts" (2005)
- "Bleeding Hearts Club" (2006)
- "P.O.S Is Ruining My Life" (2006)
- "Goodbye" (2009)
- "Drumroll (We're All Thirsty)" (2009)
- "Optimist (We Are Not for Them)" (2009)
- "Purexed" (2009)
- "Crack a Window" (2011) (with Big Cats!; split 7-inch with William Elliott Whitmore)
- "Bumper" (2012)
- "Fuck Your Stuff" (2012)
- "Sleepdrone/Superposition" (2016)
- "Wave" (2016)
- "Wearing a Bear" (2016)
- "Woof" (2016)
- "Lanes" (2016)
- "Overcast" (2019)
- "Wave" (2022)

=== Guest appearances ===
- Heiruspecs – "Commonwealth" from Small Steps (2002)
- Negative One – "Pressure" from Less Is More (2004)
- Mel Gibson and the Pants – "Shark Sandwich" from A Mannequin American (2004)
- Ernie Rhodes – "Solid" from The Orbital Effect (2005)
- Sims – "No Homeowners" from Lights Out Paris (2005)
- Mel Gibson and the Pants – "Collars Popped and Loaded" from W/ Guitar (2005)
- Word for Word – "Elevata Music" from Twin Cites or Bust (2006)
- The Awesome Snakes – "P.O.S. vs. Awesome Snakes" from Venom (2006)
- Minus the Bear – "Drilling (P.O.S Redo)" from Interpretaciones del Oso (2007)
- Astronautalis – "The Story of My Life" from Pomegranate (2008)
- The Gigantics – "Mr. Anaya" from Die Already (2008)
- Mike Mictlan & Lazerbeak – "Shux" from Hand Over Fist (2008)
- Cecil Otter – "Traveling Dunktank" from Rebel Yellow (2008)
- BK-One with Benzilla – "A Day's Work" from Radio Do Canibal (2009)
- The Returners – "I Promise" from Break Up Your Make Up (2009)
- Prof & St. Paul Slim – "Broadcasting" from Recession Music (2009)
- Approach – "Leads (Hard to Find)" from SweetKnuckleJunction (Season 1) (2010)
- Grieves – "War for the Crippled" from The Confessions of Mr. Modest (2010)
- Kristoff Krane – "Don't Mean a Thing" from Picking Flowers Next to Roadkill (2010)
- B. Dolan – "Fall of T.R.O.Y." from Fallen House, Sunken City (2010)
- Dark Time Sunshine – "Primor" from Vessel (2010)
- Dez & Nobs – "Underbelly" from Rocky Dennis (2010)
- Gayngs – "No Sweat" from Relayted (2010)
- Muja Messiah – "Dear God" from M-16's (2010)
- Mod Sun – "Keep It Movin'" from The Hippy Hop EP (2010)
- Sims – "Too Much" from Bad Time Zoo (2011)
- Open Mike Eagle – "Why Pianos Break" from Rappers Will Die of Natural Causes (2011)
- Astronautalis – "This Is Our Science" from This Is Our Science (2011)
- K. – "No Goons" from Raphood & Authenticity (Blackened Reissue) (2011)
- Scroobius Pip – "Let 'Em Come" from Distraction Pieces (2011)
- Spyder Baybie Rawdog and 2% Muck – "Knockin' at Your Door" and "Let Me Know" from Now That's What I Call Raw Vol. 2: Poornigraphy (2011)
- Dark Time Sunshine – "Overlordian" from Anx (2012)
- Mike Mictlan – "Syke!" and "Let Me Know" from Snaxxx (2012)
- Showyousuck – "Hotline Miami" from Dude Bro (2013)
- Busdriver – "Go Hard or Go Homogenous" from Perfect Hair deluxe edition (2014)
- Toki Wright & Big Cats! – "Heal" from Pangaea (2014)
- Koo Koo Kanga Roo – "Shake It Well" from Whoopty Whoop (2014)
- Play Date – "Ninja Pajamas" from We All Shine (2015)
- Sean Anonymous + Dimitry Killstorm – "Big Bang" from Better Days (2015)
- Cavanaugh – "Typecast" from Time and Materials (2015)
- Greg Grease – "On a Limb" from Born to Lurk, Forced to Work (2015)
- Onry Ozzborn – "Turmoil" from Duo (2016)
- Red Pill – "Fuck Your Ambition" from Instinctive Drowning (2016)
- Sadistik – "Molecules" from Altars (2017)
- YYY – "Here Today" from A Tribute to the Beach Boys' Pet Sounds (2017)
- Joey Van Phillips – "Broken Arrow" from Punch Bowl (2017)
- Cas One vs. Figure – "Never Stop Running" from So Our Egos Don't Kill Us (2017)
- Ultra Suede – "What It Is" from Ultra Suede (2018)
- Transit22 – "Against the Wind" from Dark Day // Good Morning (2019)
- Infidelix – "Six Days Six Nights" from #ripme (2019)
- Dwynell Roland – "Motions" from Weird Captions (2019)
- Ceschi – "Incesticide" from Sans Soleil (2019)
- The MC Type – "Over the Influence" from Lucky Silverback (2024)

== See also ==
- Underground hip-hop
- Twin Cities hip-hop
