= F.Stokes =

American rapper

- Born: Rodney Lucas; December 11, 1982 (age 43); South Side, Chicago, Illinois, U.S.
- Genre: Hip-hop
- Occupation: Rapper
- Years active: 2009–present
- Website: fstokes.bandcamp.com

Rodney Lucas (born December 11, 1982), better known by his stage name F.Stokes (pronounced "F Dot Stokes"), is an American rapper from South Side, Chicago, Illinois.

== Early life ==
Rodney Lucas is originally from South Side, Chicago, Illinois. Around the age of 11, he moved to Madison, Wisconsin. He attended Madison West High School. At the age of 19, he moved to New York City, New York. He interned at Def Jam Recordings and worked at Grandstand Entertainment.

== Career ==
Lucas' stage name, F.Stokes, derives from Flukey Stokes, who lived in his Chicago neighborhood growing up.

In 2009, he released a collaborative studio album with producer Lazerbeak, titled Death of a Handsome Bride. In 2012, he released the Love, Always EP. In 2013, he released a studio album, Fearless Beauty, entirely produced by Paper Tiger. In that year, he appeared as a rap coach on the MTV television series Made. He starred in the 2015 short film Melville.

== Style and influences ==
In a 2012 interview, F.Stokes stated that his early works reflected his environment such as pimps and gangsters. His music has also been influenced by Patti Smith, Johnny Cash, Miles Davis, and Kanye West.

== Discography ==
=== Studio albums ===
- Death of a Handsome Bride (2009) (with Lazerbeak)
- Fearless Beauty (2013)

=== Mixtapes ===
- F.I.L.M. (Forever I Love Madison) (2009)
- Baked Goods (2011)

=== EPs ===
- Remnants of a Broken Soul (2010)
- Love, Always (2012)
- Liquor Sto' Diaries (2014)
- A Princess Named Leroy (2015)

=== Singles ===
- "Shaka Zulu" (2013)
- "1954" (2013)
- "Carpe Diem" (2013)

=== Guest appearances ===
- Mister Modo & Ugly Mac Beer - "He's Alive" from Remi Domost (2010)
- Mister Modo & Ugly Mac Beer - "Diggin' in the Crates" from Modonut 2 (2011)
- Deadlinz - "Head to the Sky" from Sonik Fiktion (2012)
- Bastille - "Love Don't Live Here" from Other People's Heartache (2012)
- Bastille - "Basement" from Other People's Heartache Part 2 (2012)
- Mister Modo & Ugly Mac Beer - "Ghost to the Ghetto" and "The Preacher" from Night Time Stories (2018)

== Filmography ==
=== Short films ===
- Melville (2015)

=== Television ===
- Made (2013)
