= Mel Gibson and the Pants =

- Origin: Eau Claire, Wisconsin
- Genres: Alternative hip-hop, indie rock
- Years active: 1997–2009?
- Label: Totally Gross National Product
- Members: Ryan Olson; Harold Sanders Jr. Ben Clark; Riley Hartnet; Eric Busse; Drew Christopherson
- Website: tgnp.bandcamp.com

Mel Gibson and the Pants is an underground hip-hop band based in Minneapolis, Minnesota. They released three albums in the early 2000s. Band member Ryan Olson is also a member of Digitata and Gayngs.

== History ==
Mel Gibson and the Pants released their debut album, A Mannequin American, in 2004. Their second album, W/ Guitar, was released in 2005.

The band released its third album, Sea vs. Shining Sea, in 2007. Ira Sather-Olson of Missoula Independent said, "Sea vs. Shining Sea proves that a marriage between numerous genres can in fact create lasting results".

== Discography ==
Albums

- A Mannequin American (2004)
- W/ Guitar (2005)
- Sea vs. Shining Sea (2007)
