= Paper Tiger (music producer) =

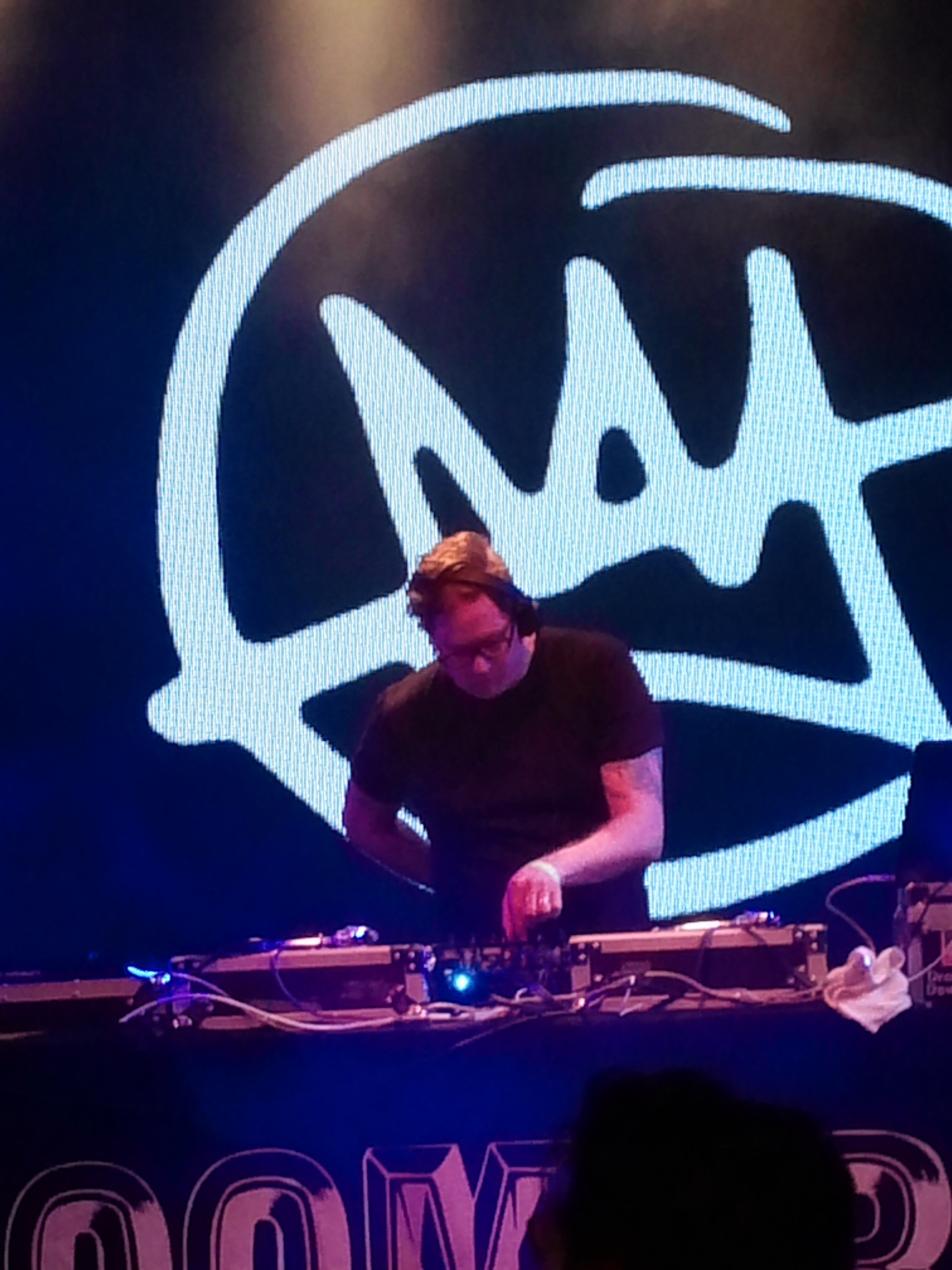
- Paper Tiger performing at Highline Ballroom in New York City in 2015

Background information
- Born: John Samels
- Origin: Minneapolis, MN, United States
- Genres: Hip-hop; alternative hip-hop, dance music, indie
- Occupations: Producer; DJ
- Instruments: Sampler; synthesizer
- Years active: 2001–present
- Label: Doomtree Records
- Website: pprtgr.net

John Samels, better known by his stage name Paper Tiger, is a hip-hop producer and DJ from Minneapolis, Minnesota, who is currently based in Brooklyn, New York. He is a founding member of the indie hip-hop collective Doomtree.

== History ==
Paper Tiger released the 7-inch vinyl single "Cloquet" in December 2009.

His first solo album, Made Like Us, was released in July 2010. It features vocal contributions from Dessa of Doomtree and Maggie Morrison of Digitata. Chris Riemenschneider of Star Tribune described the album as "a moody, sometimes dark but also surprisingly elegant and cinematic collection, recalling DJ Shadow's best stuff."

He released Summer EP in August 2012 and Beat Tape the next month. Prefix premiered the track "Gold Pass" and 89.3 The Current premiered a video for the track "The Fortunate Wayfarer."

In 2016, Paper Tiger released In Other Words Part One in April and In Other Words Part Two in July, with each containing four songs. It features vocals from Dessa and Aby Wolf.

In 2024, Paper Tiger released All Over The Place.

Samels is also a founding member of the Doomtree project SHREDDERS, as well as Cloquet, an indie electronic music project with J.Gundersen.

In addition to artistic music output Samels creates original music for film and television including the HBO documentary Rock and a Hard Place.

Besides producing, Samels also works as a designer and art director in Brooklyn, New York.

== Discography ==
=== Solo albums ===
- Made Like Us (2010)
- In Other Words (Album) (2017)
- ALL OVER THE PLACE (2024)

=== Doomtree albums ===
- Doomtree (Self Titled) (2008)—(Game Over, Liver Let Die)
- P.O.S (Never Better) (2009) (Low Light Low Life)
- Dessa (Parts of Speech) (2013) (Call Off Your Ghost, Warsaw, The Lamb))
- Doomtree (All Hands) (2015) (My Own Nation, .38 AIRWEIGHT, GRAY DUCK, 80 on 80, Cabin Killer, Generator, Off in the Deep, Marathon)
- Sims (More Than Ever) (2016) (A Bad Flying Bird, Icarus, Flash Paper, Gosper Island)
- Shredders (Dangerous Jumps) (2018)
- Shredders (Great Hits) (2019)

=== Cloquet albums ===
- Cloquet (Self Titled) (2018)
- Cloquet (New Drugs) (2020)

=== EPs ===
- False Hopes 11: Paper Tiger (2007)
- Summer EP (2012)
- Beat Tape (2012)
- In Other Words Part One (2016)
- In Other Words Part Two (2016)
- In Other Words Part Three (2017)

=== Singles ===
- Cloquet (2009)

=== Mixtapes ===
- Doomtree Standards Mixtape (2010)

=== Productions ===
- Dessa - "551" from False Hopes (2005)
- Sims - "Dreamsleep" and "No Homeowners" from Lights Out Paris (2005)
- P.O.S - "Low Light Low Life" from Never Better (2009)
- Sims - "Pay No Mind Redo" from False Hopes XIV (2009)
- Dessa - "The Chaconne," "Go Home," "The Bullpen," "Crew," and "Alibi" from A Badly Broken Code (2010)
- Mike Mictlan - "Dwnsze" from Snaxxx (2012)
- F.Stokes - Fearless Beauty (2013)
- Dessa - "Warsaw", "Call Off Your Ghost", and "The Lamb" from Parts of Speech (2013)
- F. Stokes - "Can't Call It" and "Summer Coldest" from Liquor Sto' Diaries (2014)
- Sims - "A Bad Flying Bird", "Icarus", "Flash Paper", and "Gosper Island" from More Than Ever (2016)

=== Remixes ===
- Poliça - "Chain My Name (Paper Tiger Remix)" (2013)
- Astronautalis - "Dimitri Mendeleev (Paper Tiger remix)" (2014)
- Gayngs - "Cologne & Water (Paper Tiger Regrind)" (2011)
- Mike Mictlan - "Prizefight (Paper Tiger Remix)" (2009)
- Sun Gods to Gamma Rays - "You Thought You Had It All (Paper Tiger Remix)" (2014)
- J.Gundersen - "Balcony (Paper Tiger Remix)" (2014)
