= Sims (rapper) =

- Born: Andrew Sims; Minneapolis, Minnesota, U.S.
- Genre: Hip-hop
- Occupation: Rapper
- Years active: 2001–present
- Label: Doomtree Records
- Website: sims.bandcamp.com

Andrew Sims (born October 19, 1982), better known mononymously as Sims, is an American rapper from Minneapolis. He has been a member of Doomtree and Shredders.

== Early life ==
Sims was born Andrew Sims on October 19, 1982, in Minnesota. He grew up in Hopkins, a suburb of Minneapolis. His parents were former musicians. He first began creating music at an early age when his father bought him a Casio SK-1 keyboard. At a young age, he began writing lyrics, not necessarily rap. By the time he was 14, Sims was freestyle rapping and was also in various non hip-hop bands as well. He attended Hopkins High School in Minnetonka, Minnesota, where he met P.O.S and Cecil Otter, (and later other Doomtree members). Following graduation, he studied at the University of Minnesota.

== Career ==
Sims released the False Hopes Number Four EP, the fourth in a series of Doomtree's False Hopes releases, in 2003. In 2005, he released his first solo album, Lights Out Paris. The album was released to critical success, earning 4/5 out of 5 starts from URB Magazine, City Pages and other outlets. In 2009, he released False Hopes XIV.

His second solo album, Bad Time Zoo, was released in 2011. It is entirely produced by Lazerbeak. The album was released with music videos for the tracks "One Dimensional Man", "LMG", and "Burn It Down." The album features a guest appearance from P.O.S. Drew Beringer of AbsolutePunk described the album as "one of the most bombastic hip-hop albums of 2011." City Pages included it on the "Minnesota's Best Albums of 2011" list. Sims released the Wildlife EP later that year.

In 2014, he released the Field Notes EP. It features production from Cecil Otter and Icetep, as well as a guest appearance from Astronautalis.

In 2016, he released his solo album, More Than Ever. In 2018, he released a collaborative album with Air Credits and Icetep, titled Artería Verité.

In 2017 Sims and his long-time collaborators P.O.S, Lazerbeak, and Paper Tiger released Dangerous Jumps, the first album from Shredders. They've since released the eps Great Hits(2019), Close Cuts(2024), and Serious Dudes(2024).

== Discography ==
=== Studio albums ===
- Lights Out Paris (2005)
- Bad Time Zoo (2011)
- More Than Ever (2016)
- Artería Verité (2018) (with Air Credits and Icetep)

=== EPs ===
- False Hopes Number Four (2003)
- False Hopes XIV (2009)
- Wildlife (2011)
- Field Notes (2014)

=== Singles ===
- "Burn It Down" (2011)
- "This Is the Place" (2013) (with Astronautalis)
- "Triple 6's" (2016)
- "One Hundred (Air Credits Remix)" (2017)
- "No Getaway" (2017)
- "Time Don't Fear Me Back" (2017)
- "Cannon" (2018) (with Air Credits and Icetep)

=== Guest appearances ===
- P.O.S - "Lifetime...Kid Dynamite" from Ipecac Neat (2004)
- Dessa - "Press On" from False Hopes (2005)
- Mel Gibson and the Pants - "Landmarked" from W/ Guitar (2005)
- Mel Gibson and the Pants - "Dead Baby Joke" from Sea vs. Shining Sea (2007)
- P.O.S - "Low Light Low Life" from Never Better (2009)
- Astronautalis - "Thomas Jefferson" from This Is Our Science (2011)
- Culture Cry Wolf - "Second Wind" from Dia de los Muertos (2011)
- The Hood Internet - "One for the Record Books" from FEAT (2012)
- P.O.S - "They Can't Come" from We Don't Even Live Here (2012)
- Big Quarters - "Grown Up" from Somos No Joke (2012)
- Transit - "Monster See Monster Do" from Occupy Tall Trees (2015)
- Air Credits - "Gear Shiftn" and "No Limits" from Broadcasted (2016)
- Four Fists - "Annihilation" from 6666 (2018)
- Ultra Suede - "Caldera" and "Diamonds" from Ultra Suede (2018)
