= Cecil Otter =

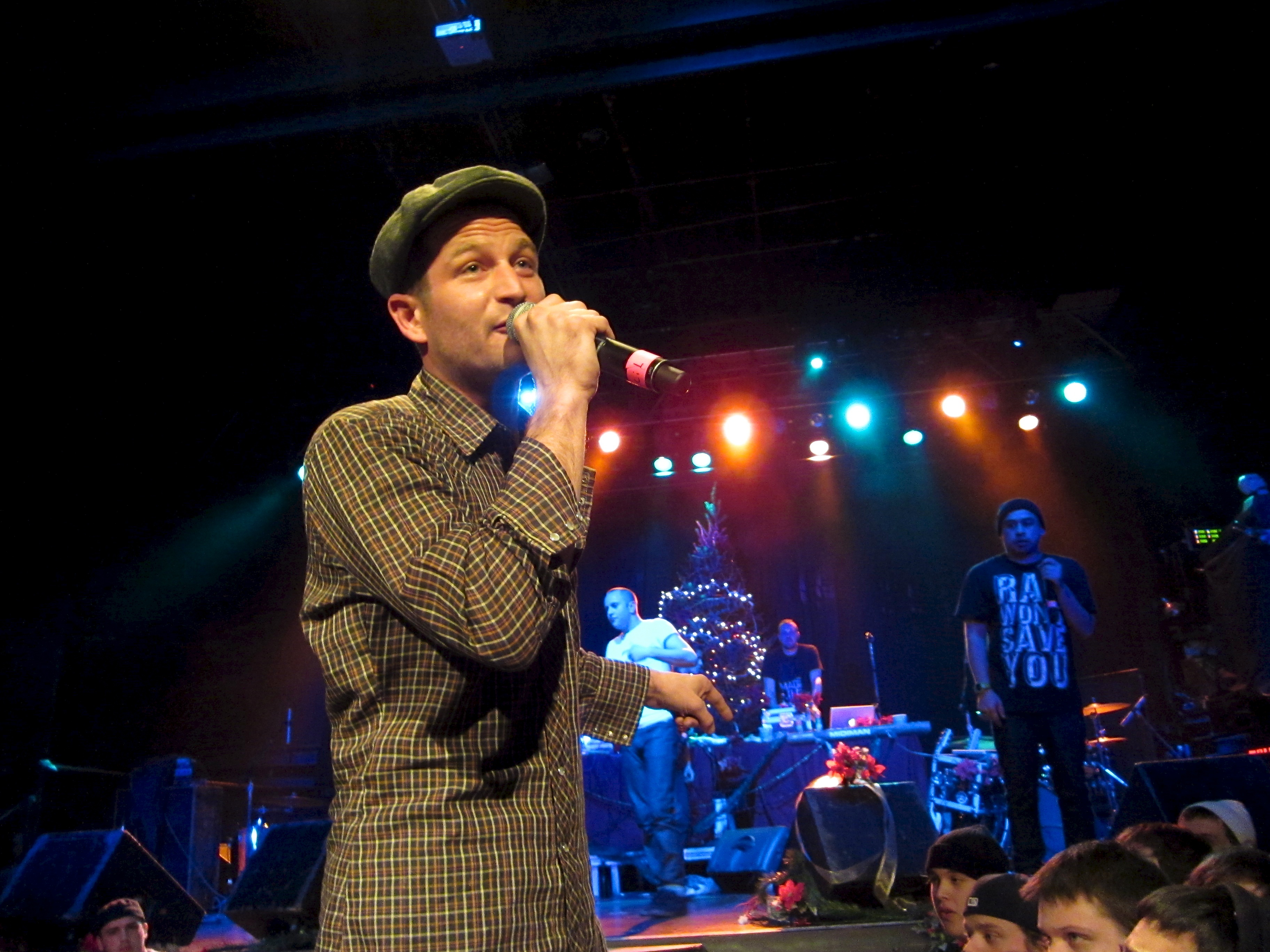
- Otter performing at First Avenue in 2010

Background information
- Born: Kyle Smith; July 16, 1980 (age 46)
- Origin: Minneapolis, Minnesota
- Genres: Hip-hop; alternative hip-hop
- Occupations: Rapper, producer
- Years active: 2001–present
- Labels: Doomtree Records; Strange Famous Records
- Website: cecilotter.bandcamp.com

Kyle Smith (born July 16, 1980), better known by his stage name Cecil Otter, is a rapper and producer based in Minneapolis, Minnesota. He is a founding member of the indie hip-hop collective Doomtree.

== History ==
Cecil Otter's False Hopes was released on Doomtree in 2005.

He released his first solo album, Rebel Yellow, on Doomtree in 2008. It was re-released on Strange Famous Records in 2009.

In 2011, Cecil Otter released 13 Chambers, a mashup album blending tracks from hip-hop icons the Wu-Tang Clan and DIY post-hardcore band Fugazi (Note: Fugazi tracks Otter used span at least three albums.), with Swiss Andy as Wugazi.

In 2012, he stated that he was working on a second solo album, Porcelain Revolver.

== Discography ==
=== Studio albums ===
- Cecil Otter's False Hopes (2005)
- Rebel Yellow (2008)

=== EPs ===
- Falsehopes (2002) (with P.O.S)
- False Hopes: Hung Over Seas (2003)
- False Hopes Mega! (2003) (with P.O.S)
- Dear Echo (2016)

=== Wugazi ===
- 13 Chambers (2011)

=== Guest appearances ===
- Dessa - "Everything Floats" from False Hopes (2005)
- Sims - "Dreamsleep" and "No Homeowners" from Lights Out Paris (2005)
- Mel Gibson and the Pants - "Beat It Loose" from W/ Guitar (2005)
- P.O.S - "Low Light Low Life" from Never Better (2009)
- Mixed Blood Majority - "Free Up" from Mixed Blood Majority (2013)
- Sage Francis - "Let Em Come Redux" from Sick to D(eat)h (2013)

=== Productions ===
- Sims - "Roll Down" from False Hopes XIV (2009)
- Dessa - "Mineshaft II" from A Badly Broken Code (2010)
- Astronautalis - "Lift the Curse" from This Is Our Science (2011)
- Sims - "Hey You (Hidden track)" from Bad Time Zoo (2011)
- P.O.S - "Wanted Wasted" and "Piano Hits" from We Don't Even Live Here (2012)
- Sage Francis - "Pressure Cooker" and "Dead Man's Float" from Copper Gone (2014)
