= Lazerbeak =

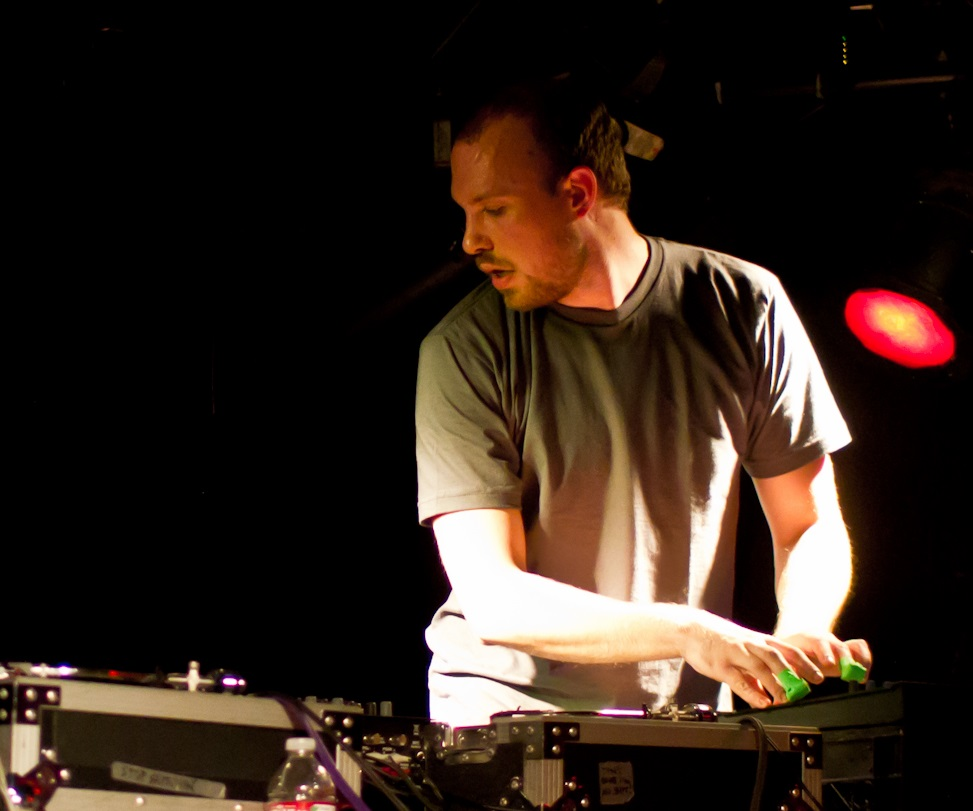
- Lazerbeak performing in Scottsdale, Arizona, in 2012

Background information
- Born: Aaron Mader; July 21, 1982 (age 44)
- Origin: Minneapolis, Minnesota, U.S.
- Genres: Hip-hop; indie rock
- Occupations: Record producer; singer; guitarist
- Years active: 2001–present
- Label: Doomtree Records
- Website: lazerbeak.bandcamp.com

Aaron Mader (born July 21, 1982), better known by his stage name Lazerbeak, is an American record producer, singer, and guitarist from Minneapolis, Minnesota. He has been a member of Doomtree, The Plastic Constellations, Mixed Blood Majority, Shredders, and Night Stone.

== Early life ==
Lazerbeak was born Aaron Mader on July 21, 1982. He graduated from Hopkins High School.

== Career ==
Lazerbeak released a collaborative album with Mike Mictlan, titled Hand Over Fist, in 2008.

His first solo album, Legend Recognize Legend, was released in 2010.

He produced Sims' second solo album, Bad Time Zoo, as well as his Wildlife EP, both of which were released in 2011.

In 2012, he released a solo album, Lava Bangers. Another solo album, Luther, was released in 2019.

Beginning in 2025, Lazerbeak began releasing a series of instrumental EPs, including "A Bridge Under the Alley," "To Be Tubing," "Seeing Friends," and, in 2026, "For Storms."

== Discography ==
=== Studio albums ===
- Hand Over Fist (2008) (with Mike Mictlan)
- Death of a Handsome Bride (2009) (with F.Stokes)
- Legend Recognize Legend (2010)
- Lava Bangers (2012)
- Kill Switch (2012) (with Edison)
- Parades (2018) (with Longshot)
- Luther (2019)
- Penelope (2020)
- Cameron (2021)

=== EPs ===
- Pool Boys (2017) (with Bionik)
- "A Bridge Under the Alley" (2025)
- "To Be Tubing" (2025)
- "Seeing Friends" (2025)
- "For Storms" (2026)

=== Singles ===
- "Winging It" (2019)
- "Retreat" (2019)
- "Ready" (2019)

=== Productions ===
- Mike Mictlan – "Euthanasia", "Marq'd 4 Death", "Soul Survivor", and "...The End" from False Hopes Eight: Deity for Hire (2005)
- Dessa – "Mineshaft" and "Press On" from False Hopes (2005)
- Sims – "15 Blocks", "So It Goes", "May 1st", and "Osmosis" from Lights Out Paris (2005)
- Mac Lethal – "Calm Down Baby" from 11:11 (2007)
- Playaz Lounge Crew – "The Struggle" and "That Guy (Plays On)" from Hype Hop (2007)
- Sims – "Pay No Mind", "TC AG", and "Birds and Earthworms" from False Hopes XIV (2009)
- P.O.S – "Let It Rattle", "Purexed", "Graves (We Wrote the Book)", "Goodbye", and "Been Afraid" from Never Better (2009)
- Dessa – "The Crow" and "Dutch" from A Badly Broken Code (2010)
- Sims – Bad Time Zoo (2011)
- Sims – Wildlife (2011)
- Astronautalis – "Thomas Jefferson" from This Is Our Science (2011)
- P.O.S – "Fuck Your Stuff", "They Can't Come", "Lock-picks, Knives, Bricks and Bats", and "Fire in the Hole/Arrow to the Action" from We Don't Even Live Here (2012)
- Lizzo – Lizzobangers (2013)
- Dessa – "Skeleton Key" and "Fighting Fish" from Parts of Speech (2013)
- Johnny Questionmark – "Whiskey" from Falling in Like (2014)
- F. Stokes – "Caps" and "Gots to Save You" from Liquor Sto' Diaries (2014)
- Sims – "OneHundred", "Oakland Ave Catalpas", "Badlands", "Buckets", and "Skating in My Sheets" from More Than Ever (2016)
- P.O.S – "Wearing a Bear" and "Roddy Piper" from Chill, Dummy (2017)
