= Doomtree =

American hip-hop band

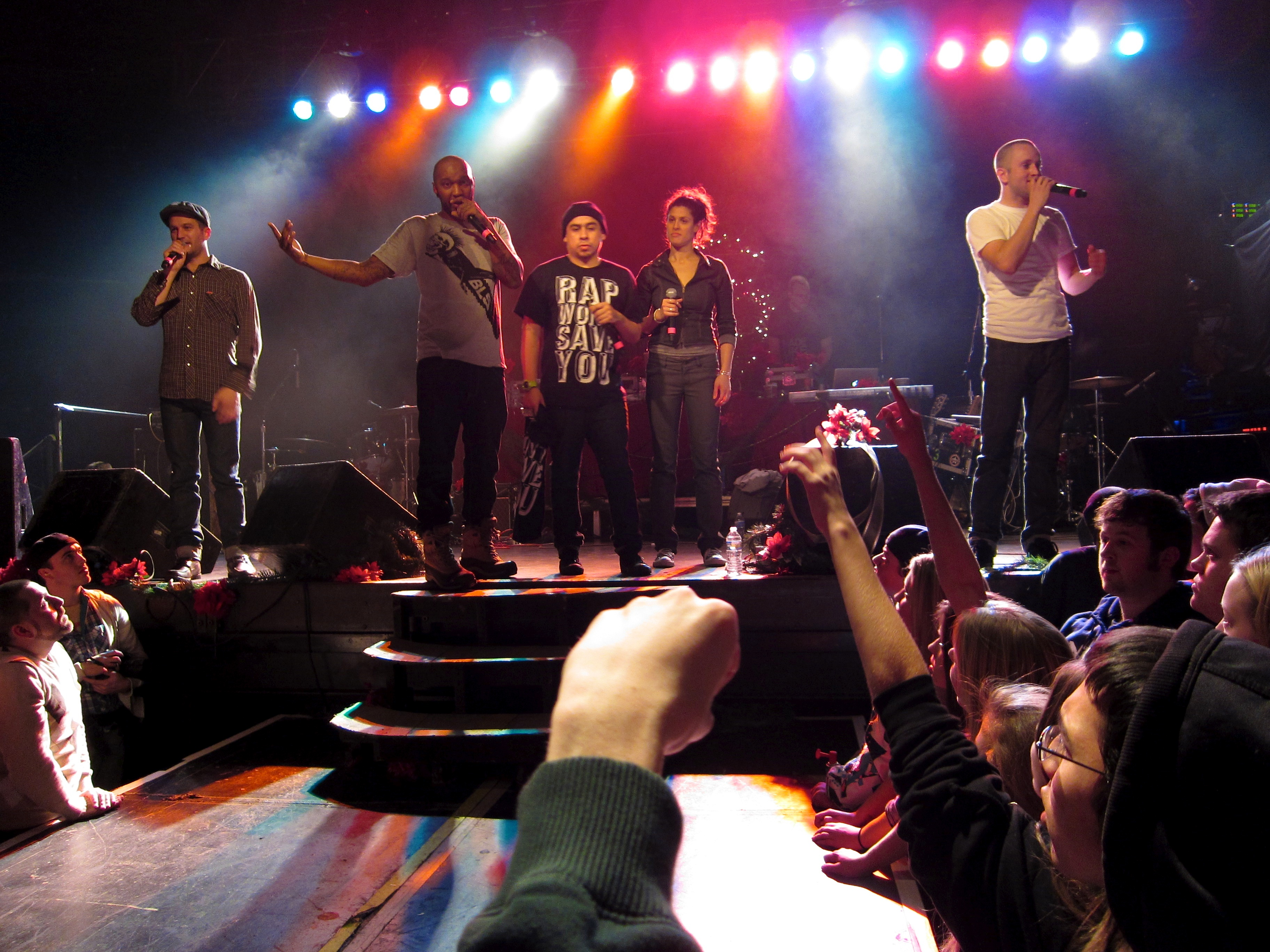
- Doomtree performing at First Avenue in 2010 (left to right: Cecil Otter, P.O.S, Mike Mictlan, Dessa, and Sims)

Background information
- Origin: Minneapolis, Minnesota, U.S.
- Genre: Hip-hop
- Years active: 2001–present
- Label: Doomtree Records
- Members: Dessa; Cecil Otter; P.O.S; Sims; Mike Mictlan; Paper Tiger; Lazerbeak
- Past members: MK Larada (aka Kai Benson); Turbo Nemesis; Tom Servo; Divine (aka Beautiful Bobby Gorgeous)
- Website: www.doomtree.net

Doomtree is an American hip-hop collective and record label based in Minneapolis, Minnesota. The collective has seven members: Dessa, Cecil Otter, P.O.S, Sims, Mike Mictlan, Paper Tiger, and Lazerbeak. The collective is known for incorporating a wide range of musical influences into their work with lyrical complexity and wordplay, and their annual "Doomtree Blowout" events held in Minneapolis venues to showcase their group performances and the Twin Cities music scene.

== Early years ==
The name "Doomtree" is a made-up word that doesn't have a meaning, according to P.O.S, who says that it has come to represent "my people and my life's work so far." When Dessa was asked about the name, she said "Initially it was a proposed name for a Cecil and P.O.S. record. The name followed us when we all lived together in a big rundown house a few years ago. Whether it was the fault of architecture or some sort of cosmic wormhole, dead pigeons always showed up on our doorstep." The group was originally named "False Hopes" when it was just P.O.S and Cecil Otter, but after consideration, it was traded off to be the name of a series of releases (there are 15 total) by Doomtree members (such as Cecil Otter's or Doomtree's debut).

Doomtree's "Wings and Teeth" logo

Members of Doomtree have described the group's formation as a gradual process. The initial lineup saw P.O.S and MK Larada, friends from high school, making songs with other local artists such as Cecil Otter and Beautiful Bobby Gorgeous. The beginning of the name began when P.O.S and Cecil Otter first envisioned Doomtree to be an in house production team. Soon enough Sims and Lazerbeak, fellow Hopkins High School alumni, followed. Mike Mictlan, having also attended high school with P.O.S, became an official member when he moved back to Minneapolis from Los Angeles. Dessa joined after having a chance encounter with P.O.S, who was living down the street from her at the time along with Sims, Turbo Nemesis and MK Larada. Sims and Dessa were said to be the last to join the collective. After its final formation, members MK Larada, Turbo Nemesis, Tom Servo, and Bobby Gorgeous gradually drifted away from the group. MK Larada is responsible for Doomtree's famous "Wings and Teeth" logo.

== Musical career ==
Doomtree's first official album, Doomtree, was released on July 29, 2008.

Their second official album, No Kings, was released to critical acclaim on November 22, 2011.

In 2012, Time included Doomtree in the "11 Great Bands You Don't Know (But Should)" list. December 12, 2012 was proclaimed by Mayor R. T. Rybak as "Doomtree Day in the city of Minneapolis" in conjunction with the opening night of the Doomtree Blowout 8 show at First Avenue.

Doomtree's documentary film, Team the Best Team, was also released as a DVD in 2012, and also as a digital stream and download in 2013.

In December 2014, Doomtree had the final installment of the annual Blowout concert series, which the crew hosted for 10 years.

On January 27, 2015, Doomtree released their third group album, All Hands. In October 2015, Doomtree curated the first Doomtree Zoo festival at the CHS Field.

== Distribution ==
While P.O.S and Cecil Otter have released solo albums on other record labels (Rhymesayers Entertainment and Strange Famous Records, respectively), each of the group albums and the majority of the collective's solo work are released on their own label, Doomtree Records.

Doomtree has also formed a publisher, Doomtree Press. In 2009, it put out Spiral Bound, Dessa's first book of poetry and fiction.

Officially, the CEO of the label is Dessa, but the label is run by the entire group, with outside help from friends such as Ander Other, Doomtree's "Intern/Merchant/Graphic Designer/Webmaster/Video Editor/Social Media Agent/Librarian."

== Style ==
As a group, Doomtree's sound reflects being a collective of many members with unique individual musical influences. Officially classified as hip-hop, the influences of jazz, punk rock, blues, rock, and soul can be detected throughout their music. Doomtree is known for having "tangled, multihued and pointedly intellectualized lyrics" with "cerebral rhymes and moody beats."

== Honors and awards ==
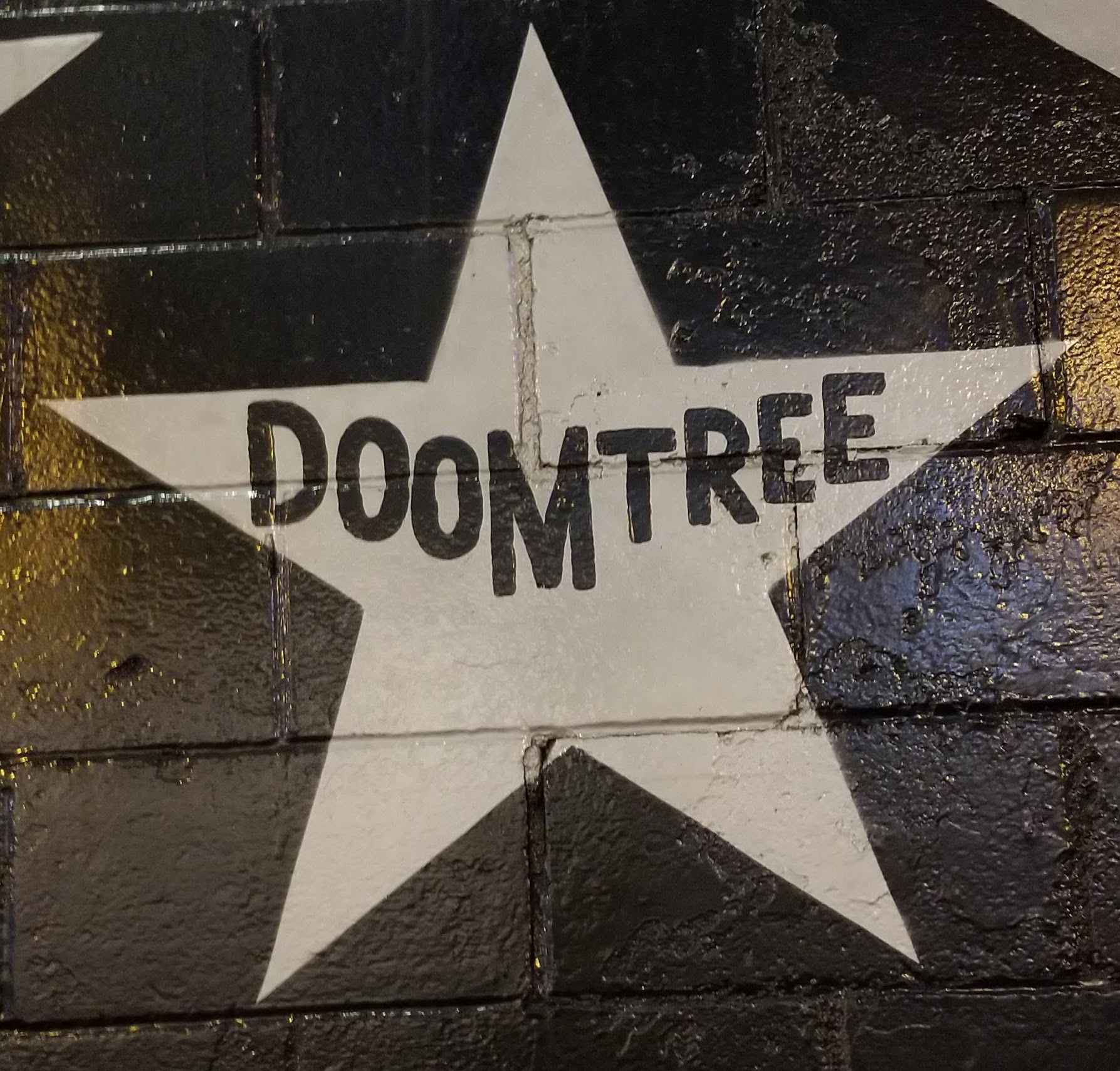
Doomtree's star on the outside mural of Minneapolis nightclub First Avenue

The group has been honored with a star on the outside mural of the Minneapolis nightclub First Avenue, recognizing performers that have played sold-out shows or have otherwise demonstrated a major contribution to the culture at the iconic venue. P.O.S also has a star for his solo work. Receiving a star "might be the most prestigious public honor an artist can receive in Minneapolis," according to journalist Steve Marsh.

== Members ==
=== Current ===
- Dessa: rapper
- Cecil Otter: rapper/producer
- P.O.S: rapper/producer
- Sims: rapper
- Mike Mictlan: rapper
- Paper Tiger: producer/DJ
- Lazerbeak: producer

=== Former ===
- MK Larada: producer
- Turbo Nemesis: producer/DJ
- Tom Servo: producer/DJ
- Beautiful Bobby Gorgeous: producer

== Discography ==
=== Studio albums ===
Title	Release date	Formats
Doomtree	July 29, 2008	CD, vinyl, digital download
No Kings	November 22, 2011	CD, vinyl, digital download
All Hands	January 27, 2015	CD, vinyl, digital download

=== EPs and mixtapes ===
Title	Release date	Formats	Notes
False Hopes	December 16, 2007	CD, digital download	12th False Hopes record and the first to feature all members of Doomtree (14 tracks)
False Hopes 13	December 9, 2008	CD	Accompanied by Doomtree Blowout DVD
FH:XV (False Hopes 15)	December 6, 2009	CD, digital download	
Affiliyated	March 4, 2011	Digital download	Remix of Gayngs' Relayted

=== Singles ===
Title	Release date	Formats
"Bangarang"	May 28, 2012	Digital download
".38 Airweight"	July 29, 2014	Digital download
"Spill Me Up"	June 13, 2016	Digital download
"Five Alive"	February 24, 2020	Digital download

=== Other ===
Title	Release date	Formats	Notes
Doomtree Blowout	December 9, 2008	DVD	Accompanied by False Hopes 13
Team the Best Team	December 11, 2012	DVD, digital download	Documentary film
Doomtree: Every Single Day	August 21, 2014	Book	

== Doomtree Blowout ==
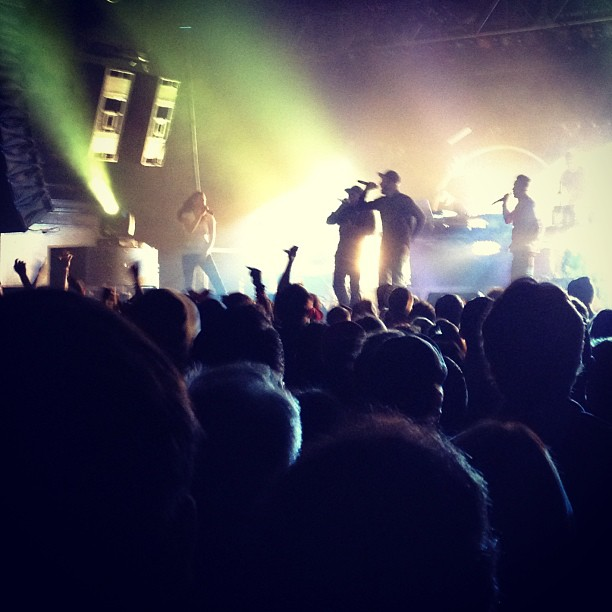
Doomtree performing at First Avenue in 2012.

Between 2005-2014, Doomtree performed in annual group shows ("Blowouts") at local Minneapolis, Minnesota venues.

Blowout	Date	Venue	Notes
Blowout 1	December 10, 2005	Varsity Theater	
Blowout 2	December 2, 2006	First Avenue	
Blowout 2 Jr.	December 16, 2006	Triple Rock Social Club	"Under 21" show
Blowout 3	December 14, 2007	First Avenue	
Blowout 4	December 6, 2008	First Avenue	
Blowout 5	December 5, 2009	First Avenue	
Blowout 6	December 10, 2010	First Avenue	
Blowout 6	December 11, 2010	First Avenue	
Blowout 7	December 4, 2011	First Avenue	Curated by Sims
Blowout 7	December 5, 2011	First Avenue	Curated by Mike Mictlan
Blowout 7	December 6, 2011	First Avenue	Curated by Dessa
Blowout 7	December 7, 2011	First Avenue	Curated by P.O.S
Blowout 7	December 8, 2011	First Avenue	Curated by Cecil Otter
Blowout 7	December 9, 2011	First Avenue	
Blowout 7	December 10, 2011	First Avenue	
Blowout 8	December 14, 2012	First Avenue	
Blowout 8	December 15, 2012	First Avenue	
Blowout 8	December 16, 2012	First Avenue	
Blowout 9	December 12, 2013	Triple Rock Social Club	All Ages
Blowout 9	December 13, 2013	First Avenue	21+
Blowout 9	December 14, 2013	First Avenue	18+
Blowout 9	December 15, 2013	First Avenue	18+
Blowout 10	December 6, 2014	Turf Club	21+
Blowout 10	December 7, 2014	Surly Doomtree Day	All Ages
Blowout 10	December 8, 2014	Icehouse	21+
Blowout 10	December 9, 2014	Triple Rock Social Club	All Ages
Blowout 10	December 10, 2014	Varsity Theater	18+
Blowout 10	December 11, 2014	First Avenue	18+
Blowout 10	December 12, 2014	First Avenue	18+
Blowout 10	December 13, 2014	First Avenue	21+

== See also ==
- Underground hip-hop
- Twin Cities hip-hop
- List of record labels
