= Sage Francis discography =

Sage Francis discography.

== Studio albums ==
List of studio albums, with selected details
Title	Details	Peak chart positions		
Title	Details	US	US Heat.	US Ind.
Personal Journals	Released: April 16, 2002; Label: Anticon; Format: CD, Vinyl, cassette, streaming, digital download; Singles: "Climb Trees"	—	—	—
A Healthy Distrust	Released: February 8, 2005; Label: Epitaph Records; Format: CD, Vinyl, streaming, digital download; Singles: "Slow Down Gandhi" "Sea Lion"	—	12	17
Human the Death Dance	Released: May 8, 2007; Label: Epitaph Records; Format: CD, Vinyl, streaming, digital download	97	—	8
Life	Released: May 11, 2010; Label: Anti-; Format: CD, Vinyl, streaming, digital download; Singles: "Slow Man" "The Best of Times"	—	—	—
Copper Gone	Released: June 3, 2014; Label: Strange Famous Records; Format: CD, Vinyl, cassette, streaming, digital download	—	—	—

== Sick of Mixtapes ==
- Sick of Waiting... (1999)
- Still Sick... Urine Trouble (2000)
- Sick of Waiting Tables (2001)
- Sick of Waging War (2002)
- Sickly Business (2004)
- Still Sickly Business (2005)
- Sick of Wasting (2009)
- Sick to D(eat)h (2013)
- A Sick Twist Ending (2025)

== Live albums ==
- Dead Poet Live Album (2004)
- Road Tested (2003–2005) (2005)

== EPs ==
- Bounce / Drop Bass (1999) as Non-Prophets
- All Word, No Play (2000) as Non-Prophets
- Sage Frenchkiss (2002)
- Climb Trees (2002)
- Makeshift Patriot (2003)
- Damage (2004) as Non-Prophets
- Slow Down Gandhi (2004)
- Sea Lion (2005)

== DVDs ==
- Life Is Easy (2005)

== Guest appearances ==
Title	Year	Other performer(s)	Album
"Testimony"	2001	Sixtoo	A Work in Progress
"When Freedom Rings"	2001	Sixtoo	Songs I Hate (And Other People Moments)
"My Head Hurts"	2002	Sole	Salt on Everything
"Try Your Best"	2002	Double Deez	Swedish Ish EP
"A Song We Made With Sage"	2003	Atmosphere	Trying to Find a Balance
"Kiddie Littere"	2004	DJ Signify	Sleep No More
"Haunted House Party"	2004	DJ Signify	Sleep No More
"Cup of Regret"	2004	DJ Signify	Sleep No More
"Let Them Eat War"	2004	Bad Religion	The Empire Strikes First
"Fashion"	2004	Pellarin	Teeth]]
"Follow Me"	2004	Molemen	Ritual of the Molemen
"Love, Love, Love"	2005	Joey Beats	Love, Love, Love
"Live Dissection"	2006	Mr. Nogatco	Nogatco Rd.
"I Got Gone"	2006	Buddy Wakefield	Run on Anything
"Rapz of Death"	2006	Mac Lethal	The Love Potion Collection 3
"Locksmith"	2006	Macromantics	Moments in Movement
"Heart Failure"	2008	B. Dolan	The Failure
"Survive Another Winter"	2008	Prolyphic, Reanimator	The Ugly Truth
"Worried About the World"	2009	The Grouch, Eligh	Say G&E!
"House Of Bees"	2009	B. Dolan	House of Bees Vol. 1
"Paid Dues"	2009	B. Dolan	House of Bees Vol. 1
"Sea Legs"	2009	B. Dolan	House of Bees Vol. 1
"Survived Another Winter"	2009	B. Dolan	House of Bees Vol. 1
"Progress Trap"	2011	Sole and the Skyrider Band	Hello Cruel World
"Art of Darkness"	2011	MC Lars	Lars Attacks!
"Let 'Em Come"	2011	Scroobius Pip	Distraction Pieces
"Wild West"	2012	Kristoff Krane, Sadistik	Fanfaronade
"Film the Police"	2012	B. Dolan	House of Bees Vol. 2
"Bad Things"	2012	B. Dolan	House of Bees Vol. 2
"2Bad"	2012	B. Dolan	House of Bees Vol. 2
"Moment of Clarity"	2013	Bullhead*ded	4Play
"Barely Alive"	2015	Ceschi, Factor Chandelier	Broken Bone Ballads
"Cult Personality"	2017	Dope Knife	NineteenEightyFour
"The Human Remains"	2018	Aupheus	Megalith
"The End Has Begun"	2018	Seez Mics	Live Long Enough to Learn
"Death Swan"	2019	The Cloaks, AWOL One, Gel Roc	Cloak Encounters of the Third Eye
"So Called Patriotism"	2019	Swab, Evolve	Out For Self
"Latuda"	2019	Trademarc	Blood Meridian
"Problems Got Problems"	2021	ALXNDRBRWN	Glow Kid
"Party McFly"	2021	Mopes, Jesse the Tree, Blackliq	Mopes
"Bigger, Badder Wolf"	2022	Jesse the Tree	Pigeon Man
"All The Smoke"	2023	Metermaids	A Line In The Sky
"Quiet On The Set"	2023	Metermaids	A Line In The Sky
"Interrupt This Program"	2023	Trademarc, Mopes	Ham & Eggers
"Master Cleanse"	2024	OldBoy Rhymes, Rituals of Mine, ALXNDRBRWN	Master Cleanse
"Full Life Crisis"	2024	The MC Type, Pen Pointz	Lucky Silverback
"American Pyramids"	2024	OldBoy Rhymes, Mr Lif	The Sane Asylum
"The Indicator"	2024	OldBoy Rhymes	The Sane Asylum
"These Days"	2024	COOLETHAN, The MC Type	You Can Never Go Back
"Grinding Halt"	2024	Seez Mics	With S.F.R.
"Dernier Cri"	2025	Krohme, Mike McTernan	Before the Animals Know You're Dead
"Recovering Adrenaline Addict"	2025	Aupheus, Buck 65, Slug	High Artifice
"Drive"	2025	Aupheus, Rob Sonic, Blueprint	High Artifice
"What Is Love"	2025	Kelro, Eyedea	Resonance
"Love Me"	2025	Kelro, Eyedea	Resonance
"Run It Back"	2025	Kelro, Eyedea, Serøtonin	Resonance
"Sundown"	2025	Kelro, F1 The Album, Eyedea, Kevin MacLeod	Sundown
"Imagine"	2025	Kelro, Bella Shmurda, Shoday, Eyedea, Portable	Imagine
"Work Faces"	2025	Balldwin Brothers, Mopes, Metermainds, Jesse the TRree, Sentence	Turkey
"Teacher"	2025	Nuels Family, Bond, Kojo Antwi, Bernth	Rocking With An Angel
"A Bad MFer"	2025	Jesse the Tree	Worm In Heaven

== Compilation appearances ==
- "Garden Gnomes" on Lexoleum (2003)
- "Crack Pipes" on Anticon Label Sampler: 1999-2004 (2004)
- "Waterline" on Pride and Glory (2008)
- "Makeshift Patriot" on Punk-O-Rama 8 (2003)

== Other ==
- Home Grown Demo Tape (1996)
- Voice Mail Bomb Threat (1998) with Art Official Intelligence
- Human the Death Dance Instrumentals (2007)

== Epic Beard Men ==
- War on Christmas (2017, single)
- Season 1 (2018, album)
- This Was Supposed to Be Fun (2019, album)
