= Metermaids (duo) =

- Origin: Brooklyn, New York
- Genre: Underground hip-hop
- Years active: 2006–present
- Label: Strange Famous Records
- Members: Sentence; Swell
- Website: metermaidsnyc.com

Metermaids is an American underground hip-hop duo based in Brooklyn, New York. It consists of rappers Sentence and Swell.

== History ==
Metermaids released Nightlife and Nightlife in Illinoise (a song-by-song mashup with Sufjan Stevens' album Illinoise) in 2008. The duo released the Rooftop Shake album on Strange Famous Records in September 2011. It is produced by 9th Wonder and M. Stine and features guest appearances from Rob Swift, Buck 65 and Sage Francis.

== Discography ==
=== Albums ===
- Nightlife (2008)
- Rooftop Shake (2011)
- We Brought Knives (2014)
- A Line in the Sky (2023)

=== Mixtapes ===
- Nightlife in Illinoise (2008)
- Hello (2010)
- Billy Mitchell Presents: Sleigh Bells (2010)

=== EPs ===
- Metermaids EP (2006)
- Live at Arlene's Grocery (2009)
- Smash Smash Bang (2009)

=== Singles ===
- "Turn the Lights Out!" (2009)

=== Guest appearances ===
- B. Dolan - "Bad Things" from House of Bees Vol. 2 (2012)
- Prolyphic & Buddy Peace - "Death of the Boombox" from Working Man (2013)
- Cas One "Vultures" from The Monster and the Wishing Well (2013)
- Sage Francis "All That Smoke (Buddy Peace Remix) from A Sick Twist Ending (2025)
