= Non-Prophets =

American hip hop group

- Origin: Providence, Rhode Island
- Genres: Hip hop, underground hip hop
- Years active: 1998–2004
- Label: Lex Records
- Members: Sage Francis; Joe Beats

Non-Prophets was a hip-hop duo consisting of rapper Sage Francis and producer Joe Beats.

== History ==
The duo came to people's attention with their first effort, the Drop Bass / Bounce 12-inch single on Emerge Music in 1999. The follow-up release came in 2000 as the All Word, No Play single.

Shortly after Non-Prophets singles caught a buzz, Sage Francis verbally committed to the then up-and-coming label Anticon for the release of his first solo album. Until Personal Journals' official unveiling in 2002, he self-released his Sick Of mixtapes which included Non-Prophets material.

Around the same time, Joe Beats created his first compilation of instrumentals, Reverse Discourse, on which Joey introduced his unpaused/uninterrupted style of producing. The album was released on Sage Francis's Strange Famous Records.

Their debut album Hope was released on Lex Records in 2003. It was described by Pitchfork Media as "one of the year's finest," also receiving a positive review from CMJ New Music Monthly. In early 2004, they toured the United States on Sage Francis' Fuck Clear Channel tour.

Today, the two are established as soloists. In 2004, Sage Francis signed to Epitaph Records. In 2010, his Li(f)e was the third and final record to come out on Epitaph's sister label ANTI-. In 2005, Joe Beats released Indie Rock Blues on Arbeid and 24-7 Records.

== Discography ==
=== Albums ===
Album information
Hope
- Released: October 7, 2003
- Label: Lex Records
- Singles: "Damage"
Hopestrumentals
- Released: October, 2004
- Label: Goodfoot Records

=== 12” singles ===
Details
Bounce / Drop Bass
- Released: February, 1999
- Label: Emerge Music
All Word, No Play
- Released: February, 2000
- Label: Emerge Music
Damage
- Released: February, 2004
- Label: Lex Records
