= Sonic Boom Bap =

EP by J57
- Released: September 27, 2017
- Recorded: 2016–17
- Genre: East Coast hip hop; hardcore hip hop
- Length: 21:14
- Label: FiveSe7en
- Producer: J57; LuvJonez; DJ Big Jeff; Big Cats

J57 chronology
Landmines (2016)	Sonic Boom Bap (2017)

Singles from Sonic Boom Bap
- 1. "My Resolution" Released: January 4, 2016

Sonic Boom Bap is the ninth solo EP of American record producer and rapper, J57. It was released on September 27, 2017 through his imprint FiveSe7en Music and features several artistes including Tenacity, Exile, Blame One, Toki Wright, amongst others; with music production from LuvJonez, Big Cats and DJ Big Jeff.

== Background and composition ==
The EP is the follow-up of Landmines which was released in 2016. In an interview with HipHopDX, J57 revealed that the self-produced 8-track project comprises songs which could not make the cut for his upcoming album and thought they "were too good to go to waste", hence the release of the EP. The EP sees J57 rap about personal issues as evidenced in "My Resolution", "Sometimes" and "Same Old Jimmy", backed with hardcore hip hop sounds and a bit of jazz as seen in "Listening to Axelrod".

== Track listing ==
Album credits adapted from official liner notes.

No.	Title	Writer(s)	Producer(s)	Length
1.	"DrumGod"	James Heinz	J57	2:14
2.	""My Resolution"" (featuring Thom Seveer)	Heinz; Thom Seveer	LuvJonez	3:18
3.	"Same Old Jimmy"	Heinz	J57	2:33
4.	"Top Floor" (featuring Toki Wright)	Heinz; Toki Wright	J57; Big Cats	3:54
5.	"Listening to Axelrod" (featuring Exile, Blame One, Cashus King, Tenacity & Sly 5th Ave)	Heinz; Aleksander Manfredi; Jahson Rutkowski; Troy Johnson; Scott Martin; Sylvester Uzoma Onyejiaka II	J57	3:26
6.	"ForeverEndeavour" (featuring Nichelle of Bulla Fey)	Heinz; Dominique Nichelle	J57; DJ Big Jeff	3:51
7.	"Sometimes"	Heinz	J57	1:40
8.	"Sonic Boom Bap" (featuring DJ Mark Ski)	Heinz; Mark Ski	J57	1:38
Total length:				21:14
