= Undertow Brass Band =

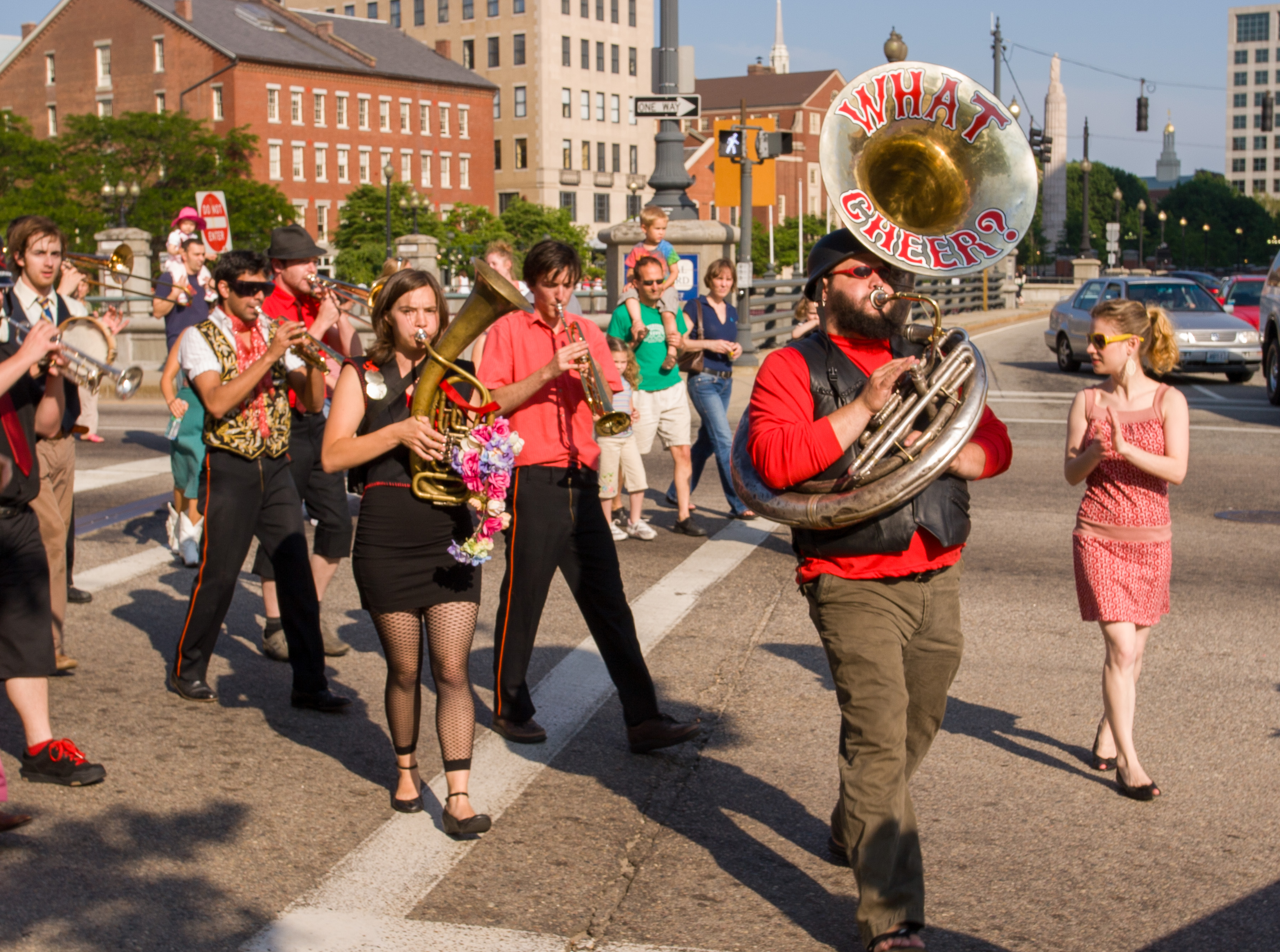
- Undertow in 2007

Background information
- Origin: Providence, Rhode Island
- Genres: Bollywood, klezmer, hip hop, rock
- Years active: 2005–present
- Labels: Don Giovanni Records, Anchor Brain Records
- Website: undertowbrassband.com

Undertow Brass Band (formerly What Cheer? Brigade) is a brass band with approximately 18 active members from Providence, Rhode Island, United States. They perform using exclusively brass instruments, saxophones, and drums in a variety of world styles, such as Indian Bollywood music, Balkan brass, klezmer, as well as American styles such as hip hop, rock, and New Orleans second line music.

== History ==
What Cheer? Brigade was formed in 2005, drawing inspiration from street brass bands in other cities like New York's Hungry March Band and San Francisco's Extra Action Marching Band. Its first rehearsals were held in Providence's India Point Park.

In the early 2020s, the group changed its name to the Undertow Brass Band, providing the following explanation:

"What Cheer?" is the city motto of Providence. It references a popular, but unsubstantiated story that portrays our city's founding as an exception to the brutality of colonialism. We changed our name, so it no longer references this harmful and inaccurate narrative.

== Performances ==
The band has performed at the HONK! festival each year since 2006, at Providence Sound Session since 2007, and has played alongside artists such as Lightning Bolt, Okkervil River, Trombone Shorty, Matt and Kim, and many others. In 2007, the band performed at the Sziget Festival in Budapest, Hungary and at the Guča trumpet festival in Serbia, as well as in Germany and the Czech Republic. In 2008, the band performed in Machias, Maine, at the Beehive Design Collective's Blackfly Ball and also shared a bill later that year with the B-52s. In 2009, the band performed with Dan Deacon at Lollapalooza in support of his album, Bromst.

In 2010, WC?B was one of eight musical groups chosen to perform at the Haizetara Street Music International Contest in Amorebieta-Etxano, Basque country, where they won the Best in Festival award and €10,000 during their European tour of Spain, France, and Italy.

That same year the band also performed at the Newport Folk Festival and the Northeast Kingdom Music Festival. In its coverage of the Newport Folk Festival, SPIN magazine named the band one of the festival's "8 Best Moments," noting that they "dominated Folk Fest like a headliner" and "were a thunderous treat at each turn." In a review of a concert with Javelin in New York City, later in 2010, the New York Times described the "punkish, face-painted brass band" as "thrillingly competent, with undimmable energy."

In 2011, the band was hired to perform at Super Ball IX, a 3-day festival held in Watkins Glen, NY, by Phish. That year the band, along with New Orleans bounce group Vockah Redu & the Cru, joined rapper B. Dolan's Church of Love and Ruin tour of the northeastern US, after collaborating with Dolan on a song for his album Fallen House, Sunken City.

In 2012, the band was a featured artist at the Danish arts and culture festival Aarhus Festuge, performing at multiple locations throughout the city of Aarhus, Denmark. They also performed at the Reykjavik Jazz Festival in Iceland that summer. Later they joined up with B. Dolan and Vockah Redu & the Cru to perform a string of tour dates in the UK as well as music festival Bestival on the Isle of Wight.

In 2013, the band performed at Toronto's Small World Music Festival.

In 2014, What Cheer? Brigade was part of the Hopscotch Music Festival in Raleigh, North Carolina, performing several times outdoors throughout the city as well as a full club set indoors.

In 2015 returned to the Haizetara Street Music International Contest in Amorebieta-Etxano, Basque country, for its 10th anniversary "tournament of champions" featuring the nine previous Best in Festival winners. The band won the popular vote of the audience, bringing home the "Special prize of the public" award. That year they also performed several sets at Le Festif! de Baie-Saint-Paul in the Charlevoix region of Quebec.

In 2016, the band returned to the Skeleton Park Arts Festival in Kingston, Ontario. They also performed an impromptu show in Ringer Park in Allston, Massachusetts with the help of local collective Deep Shred.

== Awards ==
As mentioned above, the band took the grand prize at the invitational Haizetara Street Music International Contest in 2010. In 2010 WC?B also was chosen as "Best Category-Defying Act" by the Providence Phoenix Best Music Poll., a designation it also won in 2007. In 2010 the band also won "Best New Band (Rhode Island)" in the Boston Phoenix "50 Bands, 50 States" contest. In 2007 the band was awarded "Best Riff on a Marching Band" by Rhode Island Monthly as one of its "Best of RI" editor's picks.

== Discography ==
=== Studio albums ===
- Jerk Parade (2007)
- We Blow, You Suck (2008)
- You Can't See Inside of Me (2017) on Don Giovanni Records.

=== Live albums ===
- Classy: Live in Pawtucket (2011)

=== Recordings with other artists ===
- "Border Crossing" song from B. Dolan's 2010 album Fallen House, Sunken City.
- "Love Level" song from Blondie's 2017 album Pollinator.
