= Sick of Waging War =

The Known Unsoldier "Sick Of Waging War..."

Mixtape by Sage Francis
- Released: November 30, 2001
- Genre: Hip hop
- Length: 1:10:44
- Label: Strange Famous

Sage Francis chronology
Still Sick... Urine Trouble (2000)	''The Known Unsoldier "Sick Of Waging War..."'' (2001)	Climb Trees (2002)

Professional ratings
Review scores
Source	Rating
Pitchfork Media	(7.4/10)

The Known Unsoldier "Sick Of Waging War..." (also known simply as Sick Of Waging War) is the fourth mixtape in Sage Francis' "Sick of" mixtape series.

== Track listing ==
All tracks are written by Sage Francis.

Sick of Waging War
No.	Title	Length
1.	"Commercial Radio Advice Intro"	0:28
2.	"Narcissist"	3:14
3.	"Mourning Aftermath"	4:31
4.	"Makeshift Patriot"	5:50
5.	"Freestyle Confession"	2:00
6.	"Can I Kick It?"	2:39
7.	"Hang Time (Bang Bang Boogie)"	4:04
8.	"Mutiny"	4:08
9.	"I'm Gonna Getcha"	3:09
10.	"Mermaids Are Seasluts"	4:07
11.	"Embarrassed"	3:32
12.	"Inner Conflict"	3:20
13.	"How to Write a Political Poem"	3:28
14.	"This Is Not a Dis Freestyle"	1:37
15.	"AOI Jam"	2:48
16.	"I'm Not a Hater, I'm a Motherfucking Platypus"	2:37
17.	"Question Their Motives Freestyle"	2:22
18.	"Cafe Girl"	4:11
19.	"Not What I Am"	1:27
20.	"Dirty Mac"	1:34
21.	"The Write"	0:11
22.	"Love Letters from Hell Outro"	4:43
23.	"Untitled Track"	4:47
