= DNGRFLD =

Studio album by Prolyphic
- Released: November 4, 2016
- Genres: Hip-hop, alternative hip-hop
- Length: 40:13
- Label: Strange Famous Records
- Producers: Prolyphic, Matt Stine

Prolyphic chronology
| Working Man (2013) | DNGRFLD (2016) |

Professional ratings
Review scores
| Source | Rating |
|---|---|
| Scratched Vinyl | 8/10 |

DNGRFLD is a studio album by American hip-hop artist Prolyphic. It was released November 4, 2016 on Strange Famous Records.

== Music ==
The album is mostly produced by Prolyphic, with one track contributed by Matt Stine. Guest appearances include Seez Mics and Cas One.

== Track listing ==
All tracks are produced by Prolyphic except where noted.

| No. | Title | Producer | Length |
|---|---|---|---|
| 1. | "RDNY" | | 4:25 |
| 2. | "Pale Blue Spot" | | 3:45 |
| 3. | "By A Dying Art's Bedside" | | 3:59 |
| 4. | "No More Questions" | | 1:07 |
| 5. | "A Bottled Message" | | 1:07 |
| 6. | "One Vs Many" | | 3:28 |
| 7. | "Third Gunman" | | 4:42 |
| 8. | "A Moment To CTFO" | | 1:25 |
| 9. | "Ice Cream Tacos" (featuring Cas One) | | 3:03 |
| 10. | "Love In The Time of Melancholia" | | 4:05 |
| 11. | "Rehab Killed The Rockstar" (featuring Seez Mics) | Matt Stine | 3:35 |
| 12. | "Stage Left" | | 3:08 |
