= Toki Wright =

American rapper (born 1980)

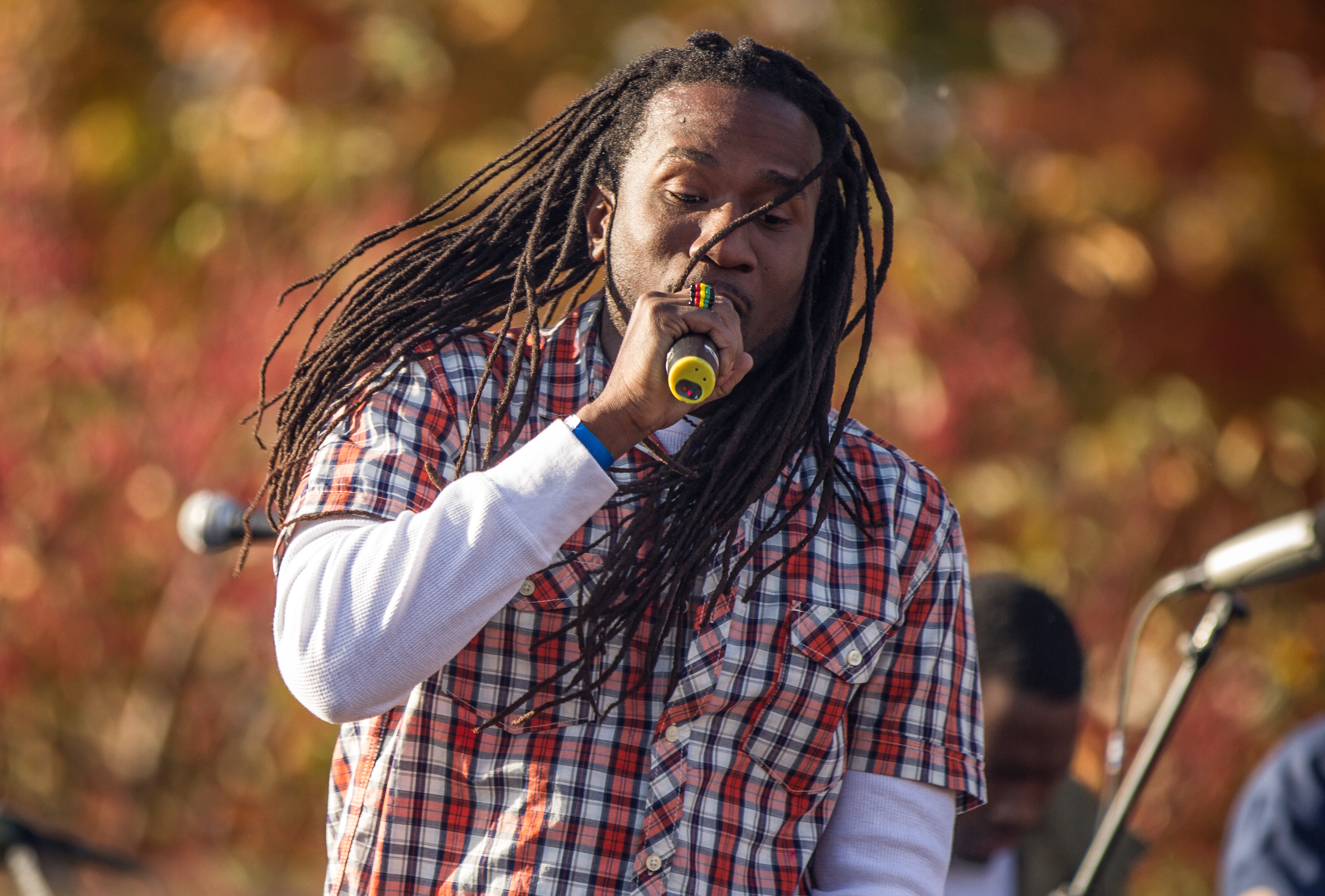
- Toki Wright performing live in 2012.

Background information
- Also known as: Mamadu
- Born: March 27, 1980 (age 46); Minneapolis, Minnesota, U.S.
- Genre: Hip-hop
- Occupations: Rapper; educator
- Years active: 2003–present

Toki Wright (born March 27, 1980) is an American rapper and music educator from Minneapolis. His debut solo studio album, A Different Mirror, was released on Rhymesayers Entertainment in 2009.

== Early life and education ==
Toki Wright was born in Minneapolis, Minnesota, United States on March 27, 1980. He attended Camden High School. He later graduated from the University of Minnesota.

== Career ==
=== Musician ===
Toki Wright met Adonis D. Frazier in 1998, and they formed The C.O.R.E. (Children of Righteous Elevation). The duo's debut album, Metropolis, was released in 2003. As well as being a member of The Chosen Few, Toki Wright has released a number of solo recordings, including A Different Mirror (2009), Black Male (2010), and Faders (2012). In 2014, he released a collaborative album with producer Big Cats, titled Pangaea. In 2017, he released an EP, At the Speed of Life 3.

==== Styles and influences ====
Toki Wright stated that "A Different Mirror", the title track from his 2009 album, was inspired by Ronald Takaki's A Different Mirror: A History of Multicultural America, saying: "Unless we look into a different mirror we will only see our own reflection. American history for example might be all apple pies and American flags for many, but the history of people of color in America is filled with poverty [and] hatred".

=== Educator ===
Toki Wright also launched and led the hip-hop studies program at McNally Smith College of Music, which closed in 2017. In 2018, he became Assistant Chair of Professional Music at Berklee College of Music.

== Discography ==
=== Studio albums ===
- Metropolis (2003) (with Adonis D. Frazier, as The C.O.R.E.)
- A Different Mirror (2009)
- Pangaea (2014) (with Big Cats)

=== Mixtapes ===
- Faders (2012)

=== EPs ===
- Black Male (2010)
- Speed of Life: Volume 1 (2011)
- Prelude to Pangaea (2014) (with Big Cats)
- At the Speed of Life 3 (2017)

=== Singles ===
- "Focus" (2006)
- "Next Best Thing" (2009)
- "More Fiya" (2010)
- "25/8/366" (2010)
- "By the Time I Get to Arizona" (2010)
- "Real Live" (2011)
- "Trakhouse" (2011) (with Emazin, Talib Kweli, and I Self Devine)
- "Let Me Live" (2012)
- "Short Circuit" (2013) (with Kristoff Krane and Carnage the Executioner)
- "For Amiri Baraka" (2014) (with Big Cats)
- "Climate Change" (2017)
- "Frequency" (2018) (with Big Cats)

=== Guest appearances ===
- P.O.S - "Ants" from Ipecac Neat (2004)
- Sims - "Market Made Murder" from Lights Out Paris (2005)
- Atmosphere - "Crewed Up" from Strictly Leakage (2007)
- BK-One - "Face It" from Rádio do Canibal (2009)
- St. Paul Slim - "Something Better" from Bald Headed Samsun (2010)
- Mike Swoop - "Let It Go" from New Love (2010)
- Greenhouse - "Only You" from Electric Purgatory Part 2 (2010)
- Bob Marley - "Sun Is Shining (Booka B Remix)" (2011)
- Destro - "Yah, Yah, Yah" from Ill.ustrated (2011)
- Abstract Rude + Musab - "Plan C" from The Awful Truth (2012)
- B. Dolan - "Film the Police" from House of Bees Vol. 2 (2012)
- Guante and Big Cats - "Until There's Nothing Left" from You Better Weaponize (2012)
- Mixed Blood Majority - "Story to Tell" from Mixed Blood Majority (2013)
- Phases Cachées - "L'American" from Boule à Facettes (2013)
- Culture Cry Wolf - "Ransom" from The Sapient Sessions (2013)
- IBE & Benzilla - "Wake Up!" from This, That and the Third (2013)
- Atmosphere - "Color in the Snow" (2013)
- Shinobi Gaines - "Livin Right" from Night Crawler Reloaded (2013)
- The Regiment - "The Solution" from Live from the Coney Island (2013)
- Ceewhy - "Goodspeed" from Freedom = Genius (2014)
- Sti-Lo Reel - "Blues Brothers" from MLK (Mortify, Live & Kill) (2014)
- Mike the Martyr - "Build Clinton" from Marbury (2015)
- Sleep Sinatra - "Nezhno" from Vibranium (2016)
- G Yamazawa - "Talk That Talk" from Shouts to Durham (2017)
- Adam Meckler Orchestra - "Our Death Under Your Pillow" from Magnificent Madness (2019)

== Music videos ==
- "Devil's Advocate" (2009)
- "A Different Mirror" (2010)
- "The Freshest Kids" (2010) (with Brother Ali and Evidence)
- "More Fiya" (2010)
- "By the Time I Get to Arizona" (2010)
- "The Soul (Go There)" (2011)
- "Real Live" (2012) (with Yakub)
- "This One (Free Verse)" (2012)
- "Film the Police" (2012) (with Sage Francis, B. Dolan, and Jasiri X)
- "Ode to Maximillian Cohen (π)" (2012)
- "No Gimmicks" (2013)
- "Livin Right" (2013) (with Shinobi Gaines)
- "Short Circuit" (2013) (with Kristoff Krane and Carnage the Executioner)
- "High Definition" (2013)
- "The Solution" (2014) (with The Regiment)
