= Road Tested (2003–2005) =

"Road Tested" 2003–2005

Live album by Sage Francis
- Released: April 20, 2006
- Recorded: 2003–2005
- Genre: Hip hop
- Label: Strange Famous

Sage Francis chronology
Still Sickly Business (2005)	"Road Tested" 2003–2005 (2006)	Human the Death Dance (2007)

"Road Tested" (2003–2005) is a live album by Sage Francis. It is a compilation of tracks recorded from the Live Band Dead Poet Tour (with Gruvis Malt, 2003), the Fuck Clear Channel Tour (with The Gimme Fund, 2004) and the 2005 tour with Sol.iLLaquists Of Sound. Some of the tracks recorded with Gruvis Malt in 2003 appeared on Francis' previous live album Dead Poet, Live Album, however the versions appearing on this album have been cleaned up, featuring basslines performed by Mikal kHill (of The ThoughtCriminals) or Arit Harvanko.

== Track listing ==
All tracks are written by Sage Francis.

Road Tested - Live 2003-2005
No.	Title	Length
1.	"Holy Rollin"	0:16
2.	"Runaways"	4:36
3.	"Sign from God"	0:14
4.	"Bang Bang Boogie/Climb Trees"	3:20
5.	"Broken Wings"	4:24
6.	"Specialist"	4:02
7.	"Kiddie Litter Spoken Word"	2:30
8.	"Sea Lion Extended"	4:15
9.	"Inherited Scars"	3:54
10.	"White Wedding"	1:13
11.	"Makeshift Patriot"	4:51
12.	"Majority Rules"	2:36
13.	"Rewrite/50 Ways"	4:56
14.	"Crack Pipes/Product Placement"	3:31
15.	"Dirty"	2:28
16.	"What's Your Name?"	1:38
17.	"Underbite Ben Finds God Spoken Words"	4:19
18.	"Cafe Girl/Capaccino"	4:06
19.	"Slum Lord Intermission"	1:17
20.	"Next Testament"	3:31
21.	"Bridle Extended"	5:22
