= The Ugly Truth (disambiguation) =

The Ugly Truth is a 2009 romantic comedy film.

The Ugly Truth may also refer to:

- Diary of a Wimpy Kid: The Ugly Truth, the fifth book in the Diary of a Wimpy Kid series

In music:

- The Ugly Truth, an album by Louis Tillett and Charlie Owen
- The Ugly Truth (album), an album by Prolyphic and Reanimator
- "The Ugly Truth", a song by Earshot
- "The Ugly Truth", a song by Nick Jonas from UglyDolls
- "The Ugly Truth", a song by Matthew Sweet from Altered Beast
- "Ugly Truth", a song by Soundgarden from Louder Than Love

In television:

- "The Ugly Truth" (Becker), an episode of Becker
- "The Ugly Truth" (Farscape), an episode of Farscape
- "The Ugly Truth", an episode of The Jamie Foxx Show
