= Controller 7 =

- Birth name: Tommy McMahon
- Born: San Jose, California
- Origin: Berkeley, California
- Genres: Alternative hip hop
- Occupation(s): Producer, DJ
- Instrument(s): Sampler, turntable
- Years active: 1999–present
- Labels: 6months, Bully Records, Wenod
- Website: controller7.bandcamp.com

Controller 7 (born Tommy McMahon) is an underground hip hop producer from San Jose, California.

== History ==
Controller 7 released the debut album Left Handed Straw in 2000. It was reissued on 6months in 2001.

He has produced and remixed tracks for Anticon artists such as Sole, Sage Francis and Themselves.

The Bumps mixtape was released in 2005.

== Discography ==
=== Albums ===
- Left Handed Straw (2000)
- Bumps (2005)
- The Lost Tapes (1997-1998) (2007)
- Exhale01 (2020)

=== EPs ===
- Expansions (2003)
- Egg (2005)

=== Productions ===
- Sole - "Dismantling of Sole's Ego" "Furthermore" from Bottle of Humans (1999)
- Deep Puddle Dynamics - "Rainmen (Controller 7 Remix)" from The Taste of Rain... Why Kneel? (1999)
- Sage Francis - "Specialist" from Personal Journals (2002)
- Themselves - "Mouthful (Matth and Controller 7 Remix)" from The No Music of AIFFS (2003)
- Sage Francis - "Agony in Her Body" from A Healthy Distrust (2005)
- Sole - "Predictions" "Crisis" from Live from Rome (2005)

=== Compilation appearances ===
- "Heckles from the Peanut Gallery" on Giga Single (2001)
- "Bunny Slippers" on Anticon Label Sampler: 1999-2004 (2004)
- "Shades of a Former You" "Reactionnary" "I Tried to Speak, But Couldn't" "Bad Blue (Last Chance)" on Lunch Money Singles (2004)
