= Buddy Peace =

- Born: Nick Budd
- Origin: London, United Kingdom
- Genres: Alternative hip hop
- Occupations: Producer, DJ
- Instruments: Sampler, turntable
- Years active: 2004-present
- Label: Strange Famous Records
- Website: buddypeace.com

Nick Budd, better known by his stage name Buddy Peace, is an English hip hop producer and DJ from London. He has been the resident DJ for Lex Records and Strange Famous Records.

== Career ==
Buddy Peace released the mixtape, Wolf Diesel Mountain, in 2008. He released Working Man, a collaborative album with the rapper Prolyphic, on Strange Famous Records in early 2013. Kraftwerking Man followed later that year.

Buddy Peace received a lifelong position at Strange Famous Records as their resident remix, scratch, and mixtape DJ.

== Discography ==
=== Albums ===
- Late Model Sedan (2009)
- Working Man (2013) with Prolyphic

=== Mixtapes ===
- A Friendly Game of Chess (2003) with Zilla
- Watch And Repeat Play (2004) with Zilla
- A Crew Called Self (2004)
- Commonwealth Kids (2006) with Carlo
- Bully Records Megamix (2006)
- Wolf Diesel Mountain (2008)
- Dirty Urban Birds (2008)
- Holy Chrome (2009)
- You Don't Have to Do This (2011)
- Go to Hell, Bastards! (2011)
- Hot Pudding (2012)
- Buddy & Muddy & Wolf (2012)
- A.D.D. (2012)
- Stop Smiling (2012)
- Go Mean! (2013)
- Atoms for Buddy Peace (2013)
- Kraftwerking Man (2013)
- Desert Sessions (2013)
- Desert Sessions Remixes: The Instrumentals (2013)
- Sons of Bitches / Ten Horn Core (2014)

=== Guest appearances ===
- Buck 65 – Dirtbike (2008)
- Sage Francis – "Sea Legs" from Sick of Wasting (2009)
- B. Dolan – "Mr. Buddy Buddy" from Fallen House, Sunken City (2010)
- 2Mex – "What You Know About" from My Fanbase Will Destroy You (2010)
- Buck 65 – "Gee Whiz", "Zombie Delight" and "Lights Out" from 20 Odd Years (2011)
- Noah23 – "Old Dog" from Fry Cook on Venus (2011)
- Sole – "Donald Trump in a Gilded Age" from Nuclear Winter Volume 2: Death Panel (2011)
- Sage Francis – "Blue" and "Viva La Vinyl" from Sick to D(eat)h (2013)

=== Productions ===
- Sage Francis – "Needle" and "Pump" from Sick of Wasting (2009)
- B. Dolan – House of Bees Vol. 1 (2010)
- B. Dolan – House of Bees Vol. 2 (2012)
- Sage Francis – "You Can't Win", "Breaking 2Bad" and "Origin to Descent" from Sick to D(eat)h (2013)

=== Remixes ===
- Dave House – "Weeknights and Weekends (Buddy Peace Remix)" from Kingston's Current (2004)
- Sil-X – "Sil-X (Buddy Peace's 'Tech Noir' Remix)" (2008)
- This Is the Kit – "Earthquake (Buddy Peace Faulty Lines Remix)" (2011)
- 2econd Class Citizen – "Liberated Lady (Buddy Peace Remix)" from Outside Your Doorway (2012)
