= You Better Weaponize =

Studio album by Guante & Big Cats!
- Released: November 6, 2012
- Recorded: 2011–2012
- Genres: Hip-hop, alternative hip-hop
- Label: Tru Ruts
- Producer: Big Cats!

Guante & Big Cats! chronology
Don't Be Nice (2010)	You Better Weaponize (2012)	Pangaea (2012)

Guante chronology
A Loud Heart (2011)	You Better Weaponize (2012)	Embrace the Sun (2014)

Professional ratings
Review scores
Source	Rating
Reviler	Favorable

You Better Weaponize is the second studio album by American rapper Guante and producer Big Cats!. It was released by Tru Ruts on Election Day, November 6, 2012.

== Release ==
Upcoming to the album's release, the duo released a music video for the song "To Young Leaders" via Guante's YouTube channel. Later, the song was picked up by Strange Famous Records and released for free on their website.

== Track listing ==
No.	Title	Producer(s)	Length
1.	"To Young Leaders"	Big Cats!
2.	"Until There's Nothing Left" (featuring Crescent Moon & Toki Wright)	Big Cats!
3.	"Lightning" (featuring Chastity Brown)	Big Cats!
4.	"Underground Sex Party" (featuring Kristoff Krane)	Big Cats!
5.	"Other" (featuring Chastity Brown, See More Perspective and Chantz Erolin)	Big Cats!
6.	"Fireworks"	Big Cats!
7.	"Everything Burns"	Big Cats!
8.	"Straight Outta Genosha"	Big Cats!
9.	"Break" (featuring Kristoff Krane)	Big Cats!
10.	"A Leap of Faith into a Bottomless Pit"	Big Cats!
11.	"The Invisible Backpacker of Privilege" (featuring Chantz Erolin and Truth Be Told)	Big Cats!
12.	"A Pragmatist's Guide to Revolution"	Big Cats!
13.	"Asterisk"	Big Cats!
