= Prayers for Atheists =

- Origin: Providence, Rhode Island
- Genres: Punk rock
- Years active: 2009–present
- Labels: Strange Famous Records, PFA Records
- Members: Jared Paul; Alan Hague
- Website: www.prayersforatheists.com

Prayers for Atheists (abbreviated PFA) is an American punk rock band from Providence, Rhode Island, consisting of Jared Paul and Alan Hague.

== History ==
Prayers for Atheists released the debut EP, Prayers for Atheists, on Strange Famous Records in 2009. The first album, New Hymns for an Old War, was released on PFA Records in 2011.

== Style and influences ==
Andy Thomas of Westword noted that "Prayers for Atheists is waiting patiently for the torch to be passed from social heavyweights like Rage Against the Machine — perhaps only to drop it and then watch it all burn." Meanwhile, Alex Dunbar of Vice said: "What sets PFA apart from most rock-rap acts is that MC Jared Paul has some real flow mastery."

== Discography ==
=== Albums ===
- New Hymns for an Old War (2011)

=== EPs ===
- Prayers for Atheists (2009)
