= Fallen House, Sunken City =

Studio album by B. Dolan
- Released: March 2, 2010
- Genre: Hip-hop
- Length: 47:03
- Label: Strange Famous Records
- Producer: Alias

B. Dolan chronology
House of Bees Vol. 1 (2009)	Fallen House, Sunken City (2010)	House of Bees Vol. 2 (2012)

Fallen House, Sunken City is the second studio album by B. Dolan. It was released on Strange Famous Records on March 2, 2010. Entirely produced by Alias, it features guest appearances from P.O.S and Cadence Weapon.

== Critical reception ==
Professional ratings
Aggregate scores
Source	Rating
Metacritic	81/100
Review scores
Source	Rating
Alternative Press	4/5 stars
HipHopDX	3.0/5
The Phoenix	3.5/4 stars
PopMatters	8/10 stars
Potholes in My Blog	2.5/5
RapReviews.com	4/10
URB	4/5 stars

At Metacritic, which assigns a weighted average score out of 100 to reviews from mainstream critics, the album received an average score of 81, based on 4 reviews, indicating "universal acclaim".

Chris Faraone of The Phoenix commented that "There are thousands of MCs who rhyme about high-ranking war criminals and corporate genocide, but few wax progressive notes like Dolan." Eddie Fleisher of Alternative Press praised Alias' production, stating, "his spastic, head-nodding beats are so good, that they occasionally overshadow the headliner." He added, "However, that's not due to any lack of talent on Dolan's part, who's on the top of his game throughout the disc." Alan Ranta of PopMatters wrote, "In a world growing more cynical by the day, Fallen House, Sunken City is a beacon of hope, as empowering and cerebral as it is worthy of bumping and grinding."

== Track listing ==
All tracks are written by B. Dolan, except "Fall of T.R.O.Y." by Dolan, P.O.S, and Cadence Weapon.

No.	Title	Length
1.	"Leaving New York"	4:15
2.	"Fifty Ways to Bleed Your Customer"	3:25
3.	"Economy of Words (Bail It Out)"	3:03
4.	"Earthmovers"	3:04
5.	"The Reptilian Agenda"	4:52
6.	"The Hunter"	4:06
7.	"Marvin"	3:47
8.	"Kitchen Sink"	3:43
9.	"Border Crossing"	5:00
10.	"Fall of T.R.O.Y." (featuring P.O.S and Cadence Weapon)	3:55
11.	"Mr. Buddy Buddy"	3:15
12.	"Body of Work"	4:41
Total length:		47:03

== Personnel ==
Credits adapted from liner notes.

- B. Dolan – vocals, co-production (7), recording
- Alias – production, arrangement (9), mixing
- Sage Francis – backing vocals (3, 9, 10)
- Justin Bowse – piano (7)
- Shane Hall – guitar (7), backing vocals (9)
- The Ticklebomb Choir – backing vocals (9)
- Larry Mauk – trumpet (9), arrangement (9)
- Neal Bijlani – trumpet (9)
- Cordero Lopez – trumpet (9)
- Andy Deangelis – trombone (9)
- Chris Erway – trombone (9)
- Katie Zmed – saxophone (9)
- Greg Burbank – tuba (9)
- Joe Defrancesco – tuba (9)
- Annelise Grimm – drums (9)
- Mindy Stock – drums (9)
- Paul McCarthy – drums (9)
- P.O.S – vocals (10), lyrics (10)
- Cadence Weapon – vocals (10), lyrics (10)
- Buddy Peace – turntables (11)
- Uncle Pete MacPhee – artwork
- Irena Mihalinec – layout
