= Copper Gone =

Studio album by Sage Francis
- Released: June 3, 2014
- Studio: Strange Famous Manor
- Genre: Hip-hop
- Length: 54:04
- Label: Strange Famous Records
- Producers: Cecil Otter, Alxndrbrwn, James Hancock, Poindexter, Reanimator, Le Parasite, Buck 65, Prolyphic, Anders Parker, Alias, Dub Sonata, John Ash, Kurtis SP

Sage Francis chronology
Li(f)e (2010)	Copper Gone (2014)

Copper Gone is the fifth solo studio album by American rapper Sage Francis. It was released on Strange Famous Records on June 3, 2014. It is the first official studio album after Sage Francis announced his hiatus, which lasted for four years. It peaked at number 180 on the Billboard 200 chart.

== Critical reception ==
Professional ratings
Aggregate scores
Source	Rating
Metacritic	64/100
Review scores
Source	Rating
AllMusic	4/5 stars
Exclaim!	9/10
HipHopDX	3.5/5
PopMatters	4/10 stars
RapReviews.com	8.5/10
The Skinny	4/5 stars

At Metacritic, which assigns a weighted average score out of 100 to reviews from mainstream critics, the album received an average score of 64, based on 7 reviews, indicating "generally favorable reviews".

Bram E. Gieben of The Skinny gave the album 4 stars out of 5, saying, "On the evidence of Copper Gone, Francis is back on top form, spitting the kind of melancholic, philosophical couplets which made him the go-to emcee for literate lyrics laced with dense, allusive layers of meaning."

== Track listing ==
No.	Title	Producer(s)	Length
1.	"Pressure Cooker"	Cecil Otter	4:02
2.	"Grace"	Alxndrbrwn	3:28
3.	"ID Thieves"	James Hancock, Poindexter	3:16
4.	"Cheat Code"	Reanimator	4:05
5.	"Dead Man's Float"	Cecil Otter	4:08
6.	"Over Under"	Le Parasite	2:48
7.	"Make Em Purr"	Buck 65	3:39
8.	"Vonnegut Busy"	Prolyphic	4:50
9.	"Thank You"	Anders Parker	3:52
10.	"The Set Up"	Alias	4:05
11.	"The Place She Feared Most"	Reanimator	3:10
12.	"Once Upon a Blood Moon"	Dub Sonata	4:23
13.	"Say Uncle"	John Ash	4:14
14.	"Maint Reqd"	Kurtis SP	4:03

== Personnel ==
Credits adapted from liner notes.

- Sage Francis – vocals
- Cecil Otter – production (1, 5)
- Alxndrbrwn – production (2)
- James Hancock – production (3)
- Poindexter – production (3)
- Reanimator – production (4, 11)
- Le Parasite – production (6)
- Buck 65 – production (7)
- Prolyphic – production (8)
- Anders Parker – production (9)
- Alias – production (10), mixing
- Dub Sonata – production (12)
- John Ash – production (13)
- Kurtis SP – production (14)
- Dilly Dilly – vocals
- Athena Hiotis – piano
- Joshua Trinidad – horns
- Daddy Kev – mastering
- Jelena Bojanic – artwork
- Irena Mihalinec – graphic design
- Sarah "Inkymole" Coleman – illustration
- Prentice Danner – photography
- Davor Drokan – photography

== Charts ==
Chart (2014)	Peak position
US Billboard 200	180
US Top R&B/Hip-Hop Albums (Billboard)	24
US Independent Albums (Billboard)	32
