= Sick of Waiting Tables =

Sick of Waiting Tables...

Mixtape by Sage Francis
- Released: February 2001
- Genre: Hip-hop
- Label: Strange Famous Records

Sage Francis chronology
Makeshift Patriot (2003)	Sick of Waiting Tables... (2001)	Sickly Business (2004)

Professional ratings
Review scores
Source	Rating
Pitchfork Media	9.0/10

Sick of Waiting Tables... is the third mixtape in Sage Francis' "Sick of" mixtape series.

== Track listing ==
All tracks are written by Sage Francis

Sick of Waiting Tables
No.	Title	Length
1.	"Vital Signs"	2:07
2.	"Drop Bass" (featuring Vocab & DF Perseus)	4:05
3.	"Who's Crying?" (featuring DF Bad Joke)	1:01
4.	"Rewrite" (featuring AOI)	3:20
5.	"Day Grows Old" (featuring Slug)	3:45
6.	"Emperor's New Clothing"	1:14
7.	"Intuition" (featuring Jaysonic)	2:50
8.	"When Freedom Rings (Snippet Verse)"	3:23
9.	"Follow Me (Snippet Verse)"	2:19
10.	"Gun Gods" (featuring Louie Rankin)	3:58
11.	"I Apologize" (featuring Sole)	5:17
12.	"Trite"	3:59
13.	"Oliver Twisted"	1:41
14.	"Testimony" (featuring Sixtoo and Sole)	4:12
15.	"I Keep Calling"	6:21
16.	"Respect the Broccoli Cock"	2:07
17.	"Swedish Fish"	2:32
18.	"Bounce (Live)"	3:24
19.	"MC Shut Up"	2:14
