= Mariah Parker =

American rapper and labor organizer

- Born: 1991 (age 34–35)
- Other name: Linqua Franqa
- Education: Warren Wilson College (BA); University of Georgia (PhD)
- Musical career
- Genres: hip hop; neo-soul

Athens-Clarke County District 2 Commissioner
- In office June 4, 2018 – September 8, 2022
- Preceded by: Harry Sims
- Succeeded by: Melissa Link

Mariah Parker (born 1991), also known by the stage name Linqua Franqa, is an American rapper and labor organizer. Based in Georgia, they served as the District 2 County Commissioner for Athens-Clarke County from 2018 to 2022.

== Early life ==
Parker was raised in a small town near Louisville, Kentucky. Parker first became interested in music from listening to their mother, a gospel singer, singing alongside other family members.

After completing their undergraduate education at Warren Wilson College, Parker briefly worked as an English teacher in Brazil before moving to Athens, Georgia in 2014.

== Music career ==
After moving to Athens, Parker founded Hot Corner Hip Hop, a project to organize shows for local hip hop acts. During this period, Parker adopted the stage name "Linqua Franqa", a pun on the term lingua franca. Parker also began writing their own raps and participating in rap battles. This early work culminated in the release of Parker's debut album, Model Minority, in 2018. Spin has described Model Minority as "a sophisticated aural exploration of self, race, mental health, and social justice".

Parker holds a Ph.D. in Language and Literacy from the University of Georgia. Their second album, 2022's Bellringer, was composed as a portion of their dissertation for this program. Parker describes their academic experience in linguistics as an "analytic toolkit" that helps them refine their songwriting approach and delivery. Georgia Public Broadcasting characterized Bellringer as an album that "capture[d] the essence of 2022". Bellringer also includes the single "Wurk", which has attracted attention among organized labor advocates and led Parker to be invited to perform at the 2022 AFL–CIO Convention.

Parker's music has been described as combining hip hop and neo-soul.

In addition to their music, Parker hosts a podcast titled "Waiting on Reparations" on iHeartRadio, alongside fellow Georgia rapper Dope Knife.

== Political career ==
After their political lyrics attracted positive attention from the community, Parker began to become involved in community organizing. From there, they entered the political sphere by serving as a campaign manager for local activist Tommy Valentine, who ran for Athens-Clarke county commissioner in 2017.

At the urging of mayoral candidate Kelly Girtz, Parker ran for office personally in 2018, campaigning for the Athens-Clarke County District 2 Commissioner seat. Parker was elected to the seat, and attracted widespread attention after being sworn in on a copy of The Autobiography of Malcolm X. They were reelected in 2020, in an unopposed election. During their tenure as commissioner, Parker prioritized racial justice and the reduction of poverty in their district. Parker was also a leading advocate of the 2021 Linnentown Resolution, an effort to make reparations to families who had been displaced in the Linnentown urban renewal project in the 1960s.

Parker announced their resignation from the county commission in August 2022, stating that they had become disillusioned with the commission's limited scope and sought to return to external activism. After their resignation took effect on September 8, Parker moved to Atlanta and joined the Union of Southern Service Workers as a labor organizer.

== Personal life ==
Parker is nonbinary and queer. They have a son, born in 2021.

== Discography ==
- Model Minority (2018)
- Bellringer (2022)
