= Laura Escudé =

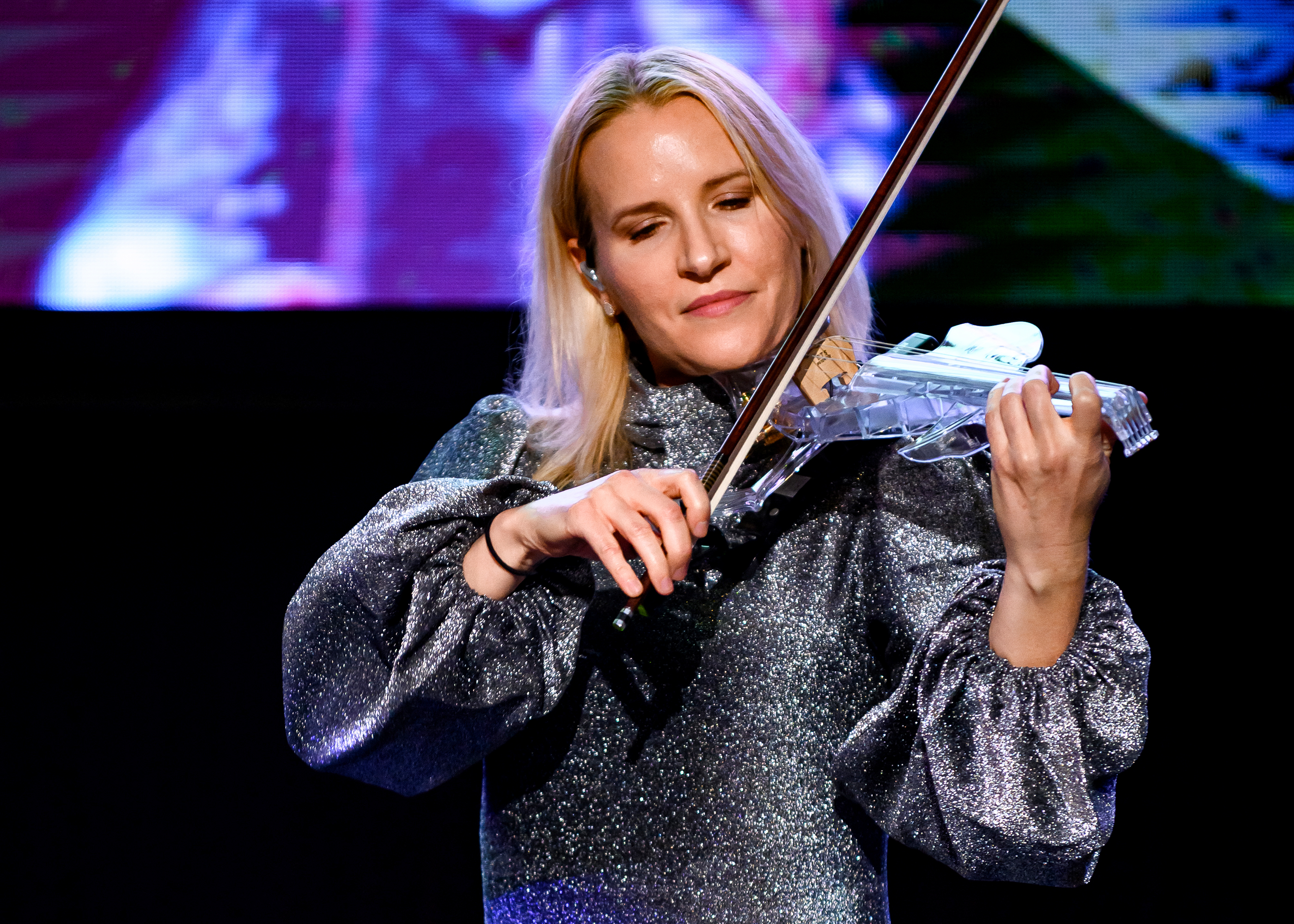

Background information
- Also known as: Alluxe
- Born: Pensacola, Florida
- Genre: Future classical
- Occupations: Controllerist, playback engineer, music technology trainer, entrepreneur
- Instruments: Violin, MIDI controllers, Ableton Live

Laura Escudé is an American artist, entrepreneur, and live show performer. She has programmed shows for artists including Kanye West, Jay Z, American Idol, Herbie Hancock and Porter Robinson, as well as composed and performed string arrangements for Kanye West and Jay Z.

Escudé founded Electronic Creatives, a company where she trains music programmers and artists.

When not working on live shows, Escudé creates music as a solo artist under her own name. She has also released music under her former alias Alluxe until 2019. As an artist, Escudé's signature "future classical" sound fuses avant-garde and classical music genres with live electronica.

== Early life and education ==
Born in Pensacola, Florida, Escudé was trained as a classical violinist and pianist from the age of 6. She began pursuing the violin more seriously and became the Concertmaster of Rogers High School in Newport, Rhode Island and was awarded the 1997 Governor's Scholar Award to attend the Interlochen Center for the Arts Summer Music Program. She later became the Concertmaster of the Rhode Island Youth Philharmonic .

Aside from her keen interest in music, Escudé was passionate about singing and acting, and actively participated in school musicals such as The Rocky Horror Picture Show and was involved in many other school events while growing up. Her passion towards fitness and wellness also started young as she was a competitive runner and was the captain of the school's cross-country track and field team.

When she was 18, Escudé received a scholarship to attend Vanderbilt University, but transferred to Florida State University after a year to explore more contemporary music in Violin Performance and to pursue a minor in Business. It was there that she became a self-taught music producer, while performing in the Pensacola Symphony Orchestra as well as the Florida State University Symphony. As a student, Escudé would book shows at the campus' live-music venue, and participated in many electronic music festivals.

== Career ==
Upon graduation in 2002, Escudé taught at the International Academy of Design and Technology in Tampa, Florida and began her violin performance career with the Santa Monica Symphony, Torrance Symphony, Multi-Ethnic Star Orchestra (MESTO), and the Observatory Orchestra.

In 2005, she began working in Technical Support at M-Audio, where she went on to do Sales and Artist Relations.

In 2007, Escudé became Ableton's first West Coast Product Specialist and a few months after, she became the world's first Ableton Live Certified Trainer and became one of the first to implement music software in some of the most prestigious live shows all over the globe.

In 2008, she founded Evotech Audio, a freelance consultancy for musical instruments brands as a product specialist for clients such as Ableton, Dubspot, MacProVideo, FXpansion, Rob Papen, MV Pro Audio, Celemony, X-Tempo Designs, Namba Gear and Toontrack.

In 2009, Escudé formed Electronic Creatives, now an Ableton Certified Training Center, that conducted educational events in the field of music production. One of her first major clients was Kanye West's engineer, Anthony Kilhoffer, whom she assisted in the programming of the Glow in the Dark tour. At that time, she was also touring with Niyaz as a violinist and a music programmer. A few months later, she moved to Las Vegas and worked on the pre-production for Cirque du Soleil's Viva Elvis Show as a programmer.

In 2011, Escudé began going on tours with Kanye West as his official music programmer and live vocal effect designer, and has been his primary playback engineer since then. Over the years, she also worked with other prominent artists such as Porter Robinson, Demi Lovato, Iggy Azalea, Charli XCX, Logic, The Weeknd, Miguel, Becky G, Missy Elliott, Rita Ora, Solange, Crystal Method, Camila Cabello, Jay-Z, Yeah Yeah Yeahs, Herbie Hancock, Cat Power, Bon Iver, Drake, Silversun Pickups, Garbage, Childish Gambino and M83.

== Musical style ==
Escudé has released music under her own name and under her former moniker "Alluxe". Her music fuses avant-garde and classical with live electronica, which she performs using custom LED controllers, vocals, and live violin playing.

Escudé's production skills have earned her remix commissions from M83, Polica and Mr. Hudson, and her violin playing can be heard on albums by Kanye West, Jay Z, Big Grams, Hit Boy, Sage Francis, Solillaquists of Sound and in EastWest's Quantum Leap Silk sound library.

As "Alluxe", Escudé opened for the likes of Miguel, Garbage, Machinedrum, Robert Rich and Funkstörung. She has performed with Kiesza, Charli XCX and Iggy Azalea.

== Community ==
Escudé is the creator of the Transmute Retreat, which allows live performers to experience accelerated transformation in a healthy, relaxed atmosphere focused on self realization and care. In recent years, she has expanded her work in the area of wellness for artists after years of professional touring, and advocates for artists to discover the tools to begin their own transformation in shifting towards a healthy and supportive atmosphere.

Escudé is widely regarded as "one of the best in the world" in the live music field. She aims to inspire other women and the next generation through women empowerment conferences and speaking engagements, and has been invited to speak at leading music technology institutions such as the University of Southern California and Berklee College of Music.

== Discography and performances ==
Live Shows

- 2018-2024 American Idol
- 2017 Missy Elliott (Programming)
- 2017 Logic (Design, programming)
- 2016 Kanye West "Saint Pablo Tour" (Programming, Design)
- 2016 Charli XCX (DJ, programming)
- 2016 Demi Lovato (Programming)
- 2015-2016 Miguel "Wildheart Tour" (DJ, programming)
- 2015 Iggy Azalea (Musical Direction, programming)
- 2015 Kiesza (DJ)
- 2015 Becky G (Musical Direction)
- 2015 Kanye West (Programming + Vocal Effects)
- 2014 Porter Robinson "Worlds Tour" (Live show design)
- 2013-2014 Kanye West Yeezus (Playback + Vocal effect)
- 2014 Mike Posner (Playback, controller design)
- 2014 Selena Gomez (playback)
- 2014 The Crystal Method (playback, controller design)
- 2013-2014 The Weeknd (playback)
- 2013 Becky G (playback design)
- 2013 Solange (playback design)
- 2013 Yeah Yeah Yeahs (keyboard + sfx design)
- 2011-2012 Kanye West + Jay-Z "Watch The Throne" tour (playback + vocal effects)
- 2012 Kanye West "Dark Fantasy" shows (playback, vocal effects)
- 2012 Childish Gambino (playback, keyboard + drum sampling—design)
- 2012 Cat Power (playback, keyboard + drum sampling—design)
- 2012 Silversun Pickups (playback, keyboard + drum sampling—design)
- 2012 Garbage (playback, keyboard + drum sampling—design)
- 2011 Kanye West + Jay-Z "Watch The Throne" tour (playback + vocal effects)
- 2011 Kanye West "Dark Fantasy" tour (vocal effects)
- 2011 Bon Iver (vocal effects +keyboard sampling—design)
- 2011 M83 (vocal effects—design)
- 2011 Herbie Hancock "Solo Piano" (custom controller design, playback, keyboards—design)
- 2011 Cirque du Soleil "IRIS" (playback—design)
- 2011 Wayne Linsey (playback, controller design—design)
- 2010 Drake "Away From Home" tour (playback)
- 2009 Kanye West "Glow in the Dark" tour (playback—design)
- 2009 Cirque du Soleil's VIVA ELVIS (playback)
- 2009 Niyaz European Tour (playback, sound design, violin)

Original Music by Albums

- 2017 Fervor (single)
- 2016 Contrast (EP)
- 2015 Stay The Same ft. Mr MFN eXquire (single)
- 2014 Hold U ft. Sister Crayon (single)
- 2013 NOMAD (EP)
- 2010 Pororoca
- 2005 Trace Element Human

Remixes

- 2014 New Beat Fund – Get Up (Alluxe Official Remix)
- 2013 Mr. Hudson – Fred Astaire (Alluxe Official Remix)
- 2012 M83 – Steve McQueen (Alluxe Official Remix)
- 2012 Polica - Lay Your Cards Out (Alluxe Official Remix)

Violin Recordings

- 2015 Big Grams "Goldmine Junkie"
- 2012 Hit-Boy HitStory mixtape
- 2011 Kanye West's "Dark Fantasy" tour H.A.M. Intro -arrangement and recording
- 2011 Kanye West & Jay-Z "Watch The Throne" on "Made in America"
- 2011 90210 TV Show
- 2010 EastWest's Quantum Leap Silk sound library* 2009 Power of the Game documentary
- 2009 Power of the Game documentary
- 2007 PlatEAU "Kushbush"
- 2007 Sage Francis "Human The Death Dance"
- 2006 As If We Existed

Filmography

- 2008 Kissing Cousins (Violinist)
- 2007 ATF: Asian Task Force (Violinist)
- 2007 Red Is the Color of (Assistant Sound Editor)
- 2006 Welcome Home (Violinist)
- 2005 Lovewrecked (Sound Editor)

Performances

- 2018 Electric Forest Festival (as Alluxe)
- 2018 Solar Flux Festival (as Alluxe)
- 2012 Paris, France with Emancipator
- 2010 Google Cloud Conference
- 2010 Dancing With the Stars with Jason Derulo
- 2007-2008 Torrance Symphony
- 2004-2008 Santa Monica Symphony
