= House of Whales =

Hip hop band from Chicago

- Origin: Chicago, Illinois, United States
- Genres: Hip hop; Electronic
- Years active: 2010–present
- Labels: Schematic Records, Self-released
- Members: Rico Sisney (MC, Keys); Aunnoy Badruzzaman (Drums, Music Producer); Danny Varela (DJ, Music Producer); Luis Mayorga (Guitar, Bass)
- Past members: Mike Ruby (Guitar, Bass)
- Website: www.houseofwhales.com

House of Whales, formerly Treehouse, is a live hip hop band originating from Chicago, Illinois and currently residing in Oakland, California. The band's current line-up consists of Rico Sisney (MC, keys), Aunnoy Badruzzaman (Drummer, Production), Danny Varela (DJ, Producer), and Luis Mayorga (Guitar, Bass). The group is known for their unique approach to the genre of hip hop, utilizing live instrumentation and electronically produced sounds.

== History ==
=== Origin (2010–2015) ===
Badruzzaman formed the group in 2010 after collaborating with Sisney. The two began shooting around the idea of starting a new project and began looking for bass players to round out the group’s sound, “We had jammed with a few other people, but we stopped jamming with people as soon as we jammed with Mike Ruby. It was just instant,” Badruzzaman said. Though founded in Chicago, the band’s members originate from across the U.S. Badruzzaman and Ruby are from Southern and Northern California and Sisney is from Atlanta. In 2012, the band released their debut EP, Tell No One, following their appearance in New York City at CMJ Music Marathon 2012 and a month-long tour in the San Francisco Bay Area. The EP went on to be nominated for a 2012 Independent Music Award. In 2014, the band released their self-titled LP and went on the receive their second Independent Music Award Nomination.

=== Colors (2018–present) ===
House of Whales released their first single with a new line-up on June 21, 2018. As a tribute to summer time in Chicago, "Colors" featured MC Show You Suck and Horn Bread (Sidewalk Chalk’s Horn Section, DBP and Sam Trump) with artwork by Jake Castro.

== Discography ==
Albums

- House of Whales (2014)

EPs

- Tell No One EP (2012)

Singles

- "Pocket Life" (2011)
- "Ana" (2011)
- "Growing Conscious" (2011)
- "Colors" (2018)

Remix

- Childish Gambino - This Is America (Unofficial Remix)
