= Epic Beard Men =

American hip hop group

- Also known as: EBM
- Origin: Providence, Rhode Island, U.S.
- Genres: Hip hop
- Years active: 2016–present
- Label: Strange Famous Records
- Members: Sage Francis; B. Dolan
- Website: epicbeardmen.com

Epic Beard Men is an American hip hop duo from Providence, Rhode Island. It consists of Sage Francis and B. Dolan.

== Career ==
Having toured and worked with each other, Sage Francis and B. Dolan wanted to put aside time to create music together. However, the two couldn't find time in their schedules until they were invited to perform at the 2016 Edinburgh Festival Fringe. There, they started writing their new collaborative songs.

Epic Beard Men's official debut single, "War on Christmas", was released in 2017. In 2018, the duo released the Season 1 EP, as well as "Five Hearts", a single from the EP. In 2019, the duo released the first studio album, This Was Supposed to Be Fun. It includes "You Can't Tell Me Shit", which became The Stranger's "Inbox Jukebox Track of the Day". The album was placed at number 20 on PopMatters' "20 Best Hip-Hop Albums of 2019" list.

== Discography ==
=== Studio albums ===
- This Was Supposed to Be Fun (2019)

=== EPs ===
- Season 1 (2018)

=== Singles ===
- "War on Christmas" (2017)
- "Five Hearts" (2018)
