= Left Handed Straw =

Studio album by Controller 7
- Released: December 25, 2001
- Recorded: 1998–2000
- Genre: Instrumental hip hop
- Length: 63:57
- Label: 6months
- Producer: Controller 7

Professional ratings
Review scores
Source	Rating
Exclaim!	favorable

Left Handed Straw is the first album by the American indie hip hop producer Controller 7. It was released on the 6months label in 2001.

== Track listing ==
1. Intro - 0:21
2. Movie Trailer - 2:36
3. Stane - 1:24
4. Love - 1:22
5. Bunny Slippers - 2:45
6. Solitary Man - 1:34
7. Test #1 - 0:37
8. Follow the Light - 1:28
9. Yellow - 3:15
10. Secrets - 1:40
11. Dismantled - 1:03
12. Test #2 - 1:34
13. Unknown - 6:11
14. The Balerina - 1:08
15. The Forest - 2:44
16. ??? - 0:36
17. Morality - 2:37
18. Test #3 - 1:36
19. Balance - 0:39
20. Unbalanced - 1:27
21. Check #434 - 0:32
22. The Candle (Remix) - 5:56
23. The Place Where Smiles Hide - 1:32
24. Tuesday - 0:31
25. Over the Hill - 1:52
26. Animal Control - 1:25
27. Imagination Cycle - 3:01
28. The World Outside My Door - 0:49
29. Test #4 - 0:33
30. Impatience - 1:00
31. Slip of the Tongue - 0:32
32. ....First Time Ever - 0:37
33. Test #5 - 1:07
34. Rain Men (Left Handed) - 4:49
35. Final Call - 1:33
36. Final Test - 0:40
37. Heckles from the Peanut Gallery - 9:35
