= Human the Death Dance =

Studio album by Sage Francis
- Released: May 8, 2007
- Genre: Hip-hop
- Length: 54:42
- Label: Epitaph
- Producers: Odd Nosdam, Mr. Cooper, Buck 65, Mark Isham, Alias, Sixtoo, Ant, Big Cats!, Kurtis SP, Miles Bonny, Reanimator

Sage Francis chronology
| A Healthy Distrust (2005) | Human the Death Dance (2007) | Li(f)e (2010) |

Human the Death Dance is the third solo studio album by American rapper Sage Francis. It was released on Epitaph Records on May 8, 2007. It peaked at number 97 on the Billboard 200 chart.

== Critical reception ==
Professional ratings
Aggregate scores
| Source | Rating |
|---|---|
| Metacritic | 77/100 |
Review scores
| Source | Rating |
| AllMusic | 4/5 stars |
| Billboard | favorable |
| Robert Christgau | (2-star Honorable Mention) |
| Drowned in Sound | 7/10 |
| Pitchfork | 7.9/10 |
| PopMatters | 6/10 stars |
| The Skinny | 3/5 stars |
| Spin | 2.5/5 stars |
| Tiny Mix Tapes | 3.5/5 stars |
| Urb Magazine | 5/5 stars |
| XLR8R | favorable |

At Metacritic, which assigns a weighted average score out of 100 to reviews from mainstream critics, the album received an average score of 77, based on 16 reviews, indicating "generally favorable reviews".

David Jeffries of AllMusic said, "Human the Death Dance may be his most personal effort, but it's also an incredibly well-built full-length -- even when it borrows from a handful of genres -- and it's arguably his best lyrical effort, undoubtedly his best production-wise." Roque Strew of Pitchfork gave the album a 7.9 out of 10, saying, "'Going Back to Rehab' weaves allusions to the greats, Nas and Biggie, into a six-minute tapestry that encompasses everything great about Sage Francis's strongest album to date: Its neon rainbow of tones and moods, the almost telepathic harmony between producer and rapper, the riveting fault-line tiptoe between memoir and manifesto."

== Track listing ==
| No. | Title | Producer(s) | Length |
|---|---|---|---|
| 1. | "Growing Pains Intro" | | 0:37 |
| 2. | "Underground for Dummies" | Odd Nosdam | 4:13 |
| 3. | "Civil Obedience" | Mr. Cooper | 4:19 |
| 4. | "Got Up This Morning" | Buck 65 | 3:11 |
| 5. | "Good Fashion" | Mark Isham | 1:34 |
| 6. | "Clickety Clack" | Alias | 3:59 |
| 7. | "Midgets and Giants" | Alias | 3:54 |
| 8. | "Broccilude" | Sixtoo | 1:14 |
| 9. | "High Step" | Ant | 1:53 |
| 10. | "Keep Moving" | Alias | 4:36 |
| 11. | "Waterline" | Mark Isham | 2:02 |
| 12. | "Black Out on White Night" | Big Cats! | 4:36 |
| 13. | "Hell of a Year" | Kurtis SP | 4:11 |
| 14. | "Call Me Francois" | Miles Bonny | 3:11 |
| 15. | "Hoofprints in the Sand" | Reanimator | 5:01 |
| 16. | "Going Back to Rehab" | | 6:11 |

== Personnel ==
Credits adapted from liner notes.

- Sage Francis – vocals, arrangement, executive production
- Odd Nosdam – production (2)
- Mr. Cooper – production (3)
- Buck 65 – production (4)
- Mark Isham – production (5, 11)
- Alias – production (6, 7, 10)
- Sixtoo – production (8)
- Ant – production (9)
- Big Cats! – production (12)
- Kurtis SP – production (13)
- Miles Bonny – production (14)
- Reanimator – production (15), turntables (3, 15, 16)
- Jolie Holland – fiddle (4), vocals (4, 12)
- Nathan Harrop – harmonica (4)
- Eaters – vocals (6)
- Christopher Sneddon – synthesizer (6)
- B. Dolan – vocals (9)
- Buddy Wakefield – vocals (10, 13)
- Roughneck Jihad – vocals (14)
- DJ Orator – turntables (14)
- Bryan Lewis Saunders – vocals (16)
- Tom Inhaler – guitar (16), bass guitar (16), piano (16)
- Laura Escudé – violin (16)
- Scott Begin – drums (16)
- Gene Grimaldi – mastering

== Charts ==
| Chart (2007) | Peak position |
|---|---|
| US Billboard 200 | 97 |
| US Independent Albums (Billboard) | 8 |
| US Indie Store Album Sales (Billboard) | 7 |
