= The Ugly Truth (album) =

Studio album by Prolyphic & Reanimator
- Released: May 12, 2008
- Genre: Hip-hop
- Length: 58:15
- Label: Strange Famous Records
- Producer: Reanimator

Prolyphic chronology
Time's Table Scraps (2006)	The Ugly Truth (2008)	Working Man (2013)

Reanimator chronology
Music to Slit Wrists By (2004)	The Ugly Truth (2008)

Singles from The Ugly Truth
- 1. "Artist Goes Pop" Released: 2008

The Ugly Truth is a collaborative studio album by Prolyphic & Reanimator. It was released on Strange Famous Records in 2008. It features guest appearances from Macromantics, B. Dolan, Alias, and Sage Francis.

== Critical reception ==
Professional ratings
Review scores
Source	Rating
AllMusic	favorable
PopMatters	8/10 stars
RapReviews.com	8/10
Sputnikmusic	4.0 (excellent)
XLR8R	7/10

Bob Gulla of The Phoenix described the album as "a blissed-out merger of Prolyphic's smart rap/poetry and Reanimator's perfectly complementary beats and motifs." Matt Rinaldi of AllMusic wrote, "Prolyphic lays his heartfelt verses over Reanimator's inventive beatwork, which combines loops, samples, and live instrumentation." Alan Ranta of PopMatters commented that "The beats are glowing with live instrument samples and boom-bap drums, easily on par with the finest yet released by the man, while the words glide as if born to those sounds."

== Track listing ==
No.	Title	Length
1.	"99 Bottles"	3:48
2.	"Born Alone"	4:56
3.	"Artist Goes Pop"	4:29
4.	"Dick & Jane" (featuring Macromantics)	3:15
5.	"Flashlight"	4:13
6.	"Survived Another Winter" (featuring B. Dolan, Alias, and Sage Francis)	4:55
7.	"The Way That I See It"	4:01
8.	"The Ugly Truth"	4:04
9.	"Box Within a Box"	3:30
10.	"On the Side"	4:01
11.	"Slow to Get Up"	1:39
12.	"Two Track Mind"	3:30
13.	"Easier Said"	3:25
14.	"Sleeping Dogs Lie"	5:18
15.	"Playing with Old Flames"	3:11

== Personnel ==
Credits adapted from liner notes.

- Prolyphic – vocals
- Reanimator – production, mixing (15)
- Macromantics – vocals (4)
- Sandrine – additional backing vocals (4)
- Jared Paul – additional backing vocals (4, 6)
- B. Dolan – vocals (6)
- Sage Francis – vocals (6)
- Alias – vocals (6), vocal recording (6), vocal engineering (6), mixing (except 15)
- Tom Inhaler – vocal recording (except 6), vocal engineering (except 6)
- Irena Mihalinec – artwork
- Josh Behan – photography
