= Hope (Non-Prophets album) =

Studio album by Non-Prophets
- Released: September 29, 2003
- Genre: Hip hop
- Length: 54:20
- Label: Lex Records
- Producer: Joe Beats

Singles from Hope
- 1. "Damage" Released: 2004

Hope is the first studio album by American hip hop duo Non-Prophets. It was released on Lex Records on September 29, 2003. The album was produced entirely by Joe Beats and all vocal duties were handled by Sage Francis. "Damage" was released as a single from the album. The album peaked at number 9 on the CMJ Hip-Hop chart.

== Critical reception ==
Professional ratings
Review scores
Source	Rating
AllMusic	3/5 stars
Christgau's Consumer Guide	B+
Dusted Magazine	favorable
HipHopDX	4.5/5
Pitchfork	9.2/10
PopMatters	mixed
RapReviews.com	7.5/10
XLR8R	favorable

Rollie Pemberton of Pitchfork gave the album a 9.2 out of 10, saying, "A highly valued reminder of the need for traditionalism in modern music, this album stands strong as one of the year's finest." Pitchfork placed it at number 19 on the "Top 50 Albums of 2003" list.

In 2012, Complex placed it at number 28 on the "30 Best Underground Hip-Hop Albums" list. In 2014, Paste included it on the "12 Classic Hip-Hop Albums That Deserve More Attention" list.

== Track listing ==
All tracks are written by Sage Francis.

No.	Title	Length
1.	"Intro"	1:32
2.	"Any Port"	4:29
3.	"Damage"	5:04
4.	"That Ain't Right"	3:47
5.	"Disasters"	2:11
6.	"Fresh"	3:39
7.	"Mainstream 307"	4:02
8.	"A Mill"	0:42
9.	"Spaceman"	4:26
10.	"Xaul Zan's Heart"	5:06
11.	"New Word Order"	5:00
12.	"Tolerance Level"	4:07
13.	"The Cure"	5:09
14.	"Outro" / "Bounce"	5:06
Total length:		54:20

"Bounce" is a hidden track that plays after the instrumental "Outro".

== Personnel ==
Credits adapted from liner notes.

- Sage Francis – vocals, executive production
- Joe Beats – production, executive production
- DJ Mek-a-lek – turntables
- Sixtoo – vocal recording, engineering, mixing
- Chris Warren – vocal recording, engineering, mixing

== Hopestrumentals ==
Hopestrumentals

Studio album by Joe Beats
- Released: 2005
- Genre: Instrumental hip hop
- Label: Good Foot Records
- Producer: Joe Beats

In 2005, Joe Beats released the album's instrumental version, titled Hopestrumentals. Unlike the original version, it includes 3 bonus instrumentals and "Bounce" is not a hidden track.

No.	Title	Length
1.	"Intro"	1:31
2.	"Any Port"	4:29
3.	"Damage"	5:06
4.	"That Ain't Right"	4:49
5.	"Disasters"	2:11
6.	"Fresh"	3:24
7.	"Mainstream 307"	4:00
8.	"A Mill"	0:41
9.	"Spaceman"	4:25
10.	"Xaul Zan's Heart"	4:08
11.	"Interlude"	1:12
12.	"New Word Order"	4:40
13.	"Tolerance Level"	4:06
14.	"The Cure"	5:06
15.	"Outro"	2:19
16.	"Bounce"	3:37
17.	"Threewrite"	4:36
18.	"My Girl Was A Groupie"	4:06
19.	"Hey Bobby"	6:12
