= More Than Ever =

More Than Ever may refer to:

- "Come prima", an Italian song, the melody for which was used for an English song, "More Than Ever"
- More Than Ever (Blood, Sweat & Tears album), 1976
- More Than Ever (Rockapella album), 2002
- More Than Ever (Sims album), 2016
- "More Than Ever" (Nelson song), 1990
- More Than Ever (film), 2022
- More Than Ever by Remember Monday, 2025
