= Reanimator (producer) =

- Born: Ryan Bowersock
- Origin: Wisconsin, U.S.
- Genres: Alternative hip-hop, underground hip-hop
- Occupation: Producer
- Instrument: Sampler
- Years active: 2002–present
- Label: Strange Famous Records

Ryan Bowersock, better known by his stage name Reanimator, is an alternative hip-hop producer from Wisconsin operating out of Chicago, Illinois.

== Career ==
Reanimator released his solo debut album Music to Slit Wrists By, in 2004. He released The Ugly Truth, a collaborative album with the rapper Prolyphic, on Strange Famous Records in 2008. He has also produced tracks for rapper Sage Francis.

== Discography ==
=== Albums ===
- Music to Slit Wrists By (2004)
- The Ugly Truth (2008) with Prolyphic

=== Singles ===
- "Artist Goes Pop" (2008) with Prolyphic

=== Productions ===
- Sage Francis - "The Strange Famous Mullet Remover" from Personal Journals (2002)
- Sage Francis - "Hey Bobby (Reanimator Remix)" from "Slow Down Gandhi" (2004)
- Sage Francis - "The Buzz Kill" "Sun vs. Moon" "Lie Detector Test" "Slow Down Gandhi" from A Healthy Distrust (2005)
- Sage Francis - "The Buzz Kill (Reanimator Remix)" from Unsound (2006)
- Sage Francis - "Hoofprints in the Sand" from Human the Death Dance (2007)
- B. Dolan - "Still Electric" from The Failure (2008)
- Sleep - "Talk About It" "Who to Point the Finger At" from Hesitation Wounds (2009)
- Sage Francis - "Jaw of Steel" "Conspiracy to Riot" "Pump" from Sick of Wasting (2009)
- Curtis Plum - "Bike Cop" from Call My Cellphone (2010)
- B. Dolan - "Fifty Ways to Bleed Your Customer (Reanimator Remix)" (2010)
