= Lights Out Paris =

Studio album by Sims
- Released: July 28, 2005
- Genres: Hip-hop, alternative hip-hop
- Length: 50:55
- Label: Doomtree Records
- Producers: Lazerbeak, MK Larada, Paper Tiger, P.O.S, Tom Servo

Sims chronology
Lights Out Paris (2005)	Bad Time Zoo (2011)

Professional ratings
Review scores
Source	Rating
URB	4.5/5 stars

Lights Out Paris is the first studio album by American hip-hop artist Sims, a member of Minneapolis indie hip-hop collective Doomtree. It was released July 28, 2005 on Doomtree Records and includes guest appearances from P.O.S, Crescent Moon, and Toki Wright, among others. The album was re-released with four remixes and five songs from Sims' False Hopes Four on vinyl in June 2015.

== Music ==
The album is produced by Lazerbeak, MK Larada, P.O.S, Tom Servo and Paper Tiger. It features Mike Mictlan, Toki Wright, Crescent Moon, Cecil Otter, P.O.S and Dessa.

== Track listing ==
No.	Title	Producer(s)	Length
1.	"So Far So Good"	MK Larada	3:36
2.	"Market Made Murder" (featuring Toki Wright and Mike Mictlan)	MK Larada; Tom Servo	5:04
3.	"15 Blocks"	Lazerbeak	4:47
4.	"Tape Deck"	MK Larada	4:48
5.	"So It Goes"	Lazerbeak	3:22
6.	"May 1st"	Lazerbeak	3:18
7.	"Barnum & Bailey's"	Brandon	1:40
8.	"Key Grip (FAX)"	MK Larada	3:21
9.	"Frontline" (featuring Crescent Moon)	Benzilla	5:39
10.	"Dreamsleep" (featuring Cecil Otter)	Paper Tiger	3:57
11.	"Osmosis"	Lazerbeak	4:08
12.	"No Homeowners" (featuring Cecil Otter, Dessa, Mike Mictlan, and P.O.S)	Paper Tiger	3:24
13.	"Lights Out / Spinal Tap (Note: The outro "Lights Out" is followed by a period of silence, after which the unlisted track "Spinal Tap" plays. The hidden track is produced by MK Larada.)"		6:50

2015 Reissue Bonus Tracks
No.	Title	Producer(s)	Length
15.	"So Far So Good (Remix)"	MK Larada	3:38
16.	"15 Blocks (Remix)"	Lazerbeak	3:49
17.	"Tape Deck (Remix)"	Paper Tiger	2:49
18.	"Spinal Tap (Remix)"	Joe Mabbott	3:11
19.	"Wooden Teeth"	MK Larada	2:22
20.	"Tape Deck (Bonus Track) (False Hopes version)"	MK Larada	4:16
21.	"20 Burnt"	Lazerbeak	2:22
22.	"Lifetimes" (featuring P.O.S)	P.O.S	2:22
23.	"Whips"	Lazerbeak	2:36

== Personnel ==
Adapted from Discogs

- Sims - primary artist
- MK Larada - executive producer, producer (1, 2, 4, 8, 11, 14, 15, 19, 20), additional production
- P.O.S - executive producer, featured artist (12, 22), producer (22)
- Joe Mabbott - engineer, mixed by, producer (18)
- Dave Gardner - mastered by
- Turbo Nemesis - mixed by
- Tom Servo - producer (2)
- Mike Mictlan - featured artist (2, 12)
- Toki Wright - featured artist (2)
- Lazerbeak - producer (3, 5, 6, 11, 16, 21, 23)
- Sean McPherson - bass (5)
- Brandon - producer (7)
- Benzilla - producer (9)
- Crescent Moon - featured artist (9)
- Paper Tiger - producer (10, 12, 17)
- Cecil Otter - featured artist (10, 12)
- Dessa - featured artist (12)
