= A Healthy Distrust =

Studio album by Sage Francis
- Released: February 8, 2005
- Genre: Hip-hop
- Length: 47:27
- Label: Epitaph
- Producers: Reanimator, Alias, Danger Mouse, Joe Beats, Daddy Kev, Controller 7, Sixtoo, Varick Pyr

Sage Francis chronology
Personal Journals (2002)	A Healthy Distrust (2005)	Human the Death Dance (2007)

Singles from A Healthy Distrust
- 1. "Slow Down Gandhi" Released: 2004; 2. "Sea Lion" Released: 2005

A Healthy Distrust is the second solo studio album by American rapper Sage Francis. It was released on Epitaph Records in 2005. It peaked at number 12 on Billboard's Heatseekers Albums chart, as well as number 17 on the Independent Albums chart.

== Critical reception ==
Professional ratings
Aggregate scores
Source	Rating
Metacritic	78/100
Review scores
Source	Rating
AllMusic	4/5 stars
Christgau's Consumer Guide	(choice cut)
Drowned in Sound	9/10
Entertainment Weekly	B+
Exclaim!	favorable
Pitchfork	8.0/10
PopMatters	8/10 stars
Stylus Magazine	B
Tiny Mix Tapes	4/5 stars

At Metacritic, which assigns a weighted average score out of 100 to reviews from mainstream critics, the album received an average score of 78, based on 26 reviews, indicating "generally favorable reviews".

Brian Howe of Pitchfork gave the album an 8.0 out of 10, saying, "On A Healthy Distrust, Francis continues to refine his contradictory blend of trash talk and activism, political polemic and introspection, pedantic bluster and profound insecurity." Stefan Braidwood of PopMatters gave the album 8 stars out of 10, saying, "A Healthy Distrust bears up effortlessly to the demands of both casual entertainment and prolonged, thoughtful analysis." Ron Hart of Billboard called it "[Sage Francis'] most impressive album yet." Michael Bennett of Stylus Magazine gave the album a grade of B, saying, "A Healthy Distrust's production and wordplay have improved to such a large degree that it's hard to believe that it could happen again on the next outing."

== Track listing ==
All tracks are written by Sage Francis, except "Sea Lion" written by Sage Francis and Will Oldham.

No.	Title	Producer(s)	Length
1.	"The Buzz Kill"	Reanimator	4:05
2.	"Sea Lion"	Alias	3:01
3.	"Gunz Yo"	Danger Mouse	3:03
4.	"Escape Artist"	Alias	4:15
5.	"Product Placement"	Alias	2:15
6.	"Voice Mail Bomb Threat"	Joe Beats	1:39
7.	"Dance Monkey"	Daddy Kev	2:53
8.	"Sun vs. Moon"	Reanimator	3:28
9.	"Agony in Her Body"	Controller 7	4:17
10.	"Crumble"	Sixtoo	2:00
11.	"Ground Control"	Sixtoo	3:52
12.	"Lie Detector Test"	Reanimator	2:47
13.	"Bridle"	Varick Pyr	2:11
14.	"Slow Down Gandhi"	Reanimator	4:52
15.	"Jah Didn't Kill Johnny"		2:49

== Personnel ==
Credits adapted from liner notes.

- Sage Francis – vocals, recording, executive production
- Reanimator – production (1, 8, 12, 14)
- Alias – production (2, 4, 5), guitar (10), drums (10)
- Danger Mouse – production (3)
- Joe Beats – production (6)
- Daddy Kev – production (7)
- Controller 7 – production (9)
- Sixtoo – production (10, 11)
- Varick Pyr – production (13)
- Will Oldham – vocals (2), guitar (2)
- Tom Inhaler – guitar (15)
- Nathan H. – harmonica (15)
- Chris Warren – engineering, mixing
- Gene Grimaldi – mastering

== Charts ==
Chart (2005)	Peak position
US Heatseekers Albums (Billboard)	12
US Independent Albums (Billboard)	17
