= Bad Time Zoo =

Studio album by Sims
- Released: February 15, 2011
- Genres: Hip-hop, alternative hip-hop
- Length: 52:25
- Label: Doomtree Records
- Producer: Lazerbeak

Sims chronology
Lights Out Paris (2005)	Bad Time Zoo (2011)	More Than Ever (2016)

Singles from Bad Time Zoo
- 1. "Burn It Down" Released: 2010

Professional ratings
Aggregate scores
Source	Rating
Metacritic	79/100
Review scores
Source	Rating
Alarm	favorable
Alternative Press	4/5 stars
The Austin Chronicle	3.5/5 stars
The A.V. Club	B
HipHopDX	3.5/5 stars
Punknews.org	4/5 stars
Scene Point Blank	8.4/10
Sputnikmusic	4.5/5
Urb	3.5/5 stars

Bad Time Zoo is the second studio album by American rapper Sims, a member of Minneapolis indie hip-hop collective Doomtree. It was released on Doomtree Records on February 15, 2011. The album is entirely produced by Lazerbeak.

Sims told an interviewer for RapReviews that he had originally titled the album The Veldt, inspired by the Ray Bradbury short story, "because a lot of the songs use animal imagery as metaphors for human interactions."

== Critical reception ==
At Metacritic, which assigns a weighted average score out of 100 to reviews from mainstream critics, Bad Time Zoo received an average score of 79% based on 4 reviews, indicating "generally favorable reviews".

The single, "Burn It Down", was listed by KEXP-FM as their "Song of the Day" on June 24, 2011.

== Track listing ==
No.	Title	Length
1.	"Future Shock"	4:13
2.	"Burn It Down"	2:55
3.	"Bad Time Zoo"	2:42
4.	"Too Much" (featuring P.O.S)	3:29
5.	"One Dimensional Man"	3:15
6.	"In My Sleep"	3:01
7.	"When It Rolls In"	3:43
8.	"Good Times"	3:01
9.	"LMG"	3:13
10.	"The Veldt"	3:15
11.	"Weight"	2:51
12.	"Radio Opaque"	3:54
13.	"Sink or Syncopate"	4:24
14.	"Hey You"	3:24

== Charts ==
Chart	Peak position
US Heatseekers Albums (Billboard)	18
US Top R&B/Hip-Hop Albums (Billboard)	69
