= Dope Knife =

American rapper

- Also known as: Knife; The Knife
- Born: Kedrick Toga Mack
- Origin: Savannah, Georgia
- Genres: Hip-hop, alternative hip-hop
- Occupations: Rapper; Record producer
- Years active: 2007-present
- Labels: Strange Famous Records; Fake Four Inc; Dope Sandwich Productions; Uni-Fi Records
- Website: dopeknife.com strangefamousrecords.com

Kedrick Toga Mack, better known by his stage name Dope Knife (often stylized Dope KNife), is an American hip-hop rapper and record producer from Savannah, Georgia. He is a founding member of the hip-hop collective Dope Sandwich and group Happy Thoughts.

== Musical career ==
Dope Knife made his first appearance in 2007 on the Dope Sandwich album The Walking Sick.

In 2014, he released the album Iconoclast.

Two years later, Dope Knife met up with hip-hop artist and record label executive Ceschi. Dope Knife's EP Weekend at Brodie's was released in December 2016 on Fake Four Inc.

In 2017, Dope Knife signed onto Sage Francis' label, Strange Famous Records. Soon after, Knife released his follow up solo album NineteenEightyFour.

In 2020, Dope Knife teamed up with Canadian producer Factor Chandelier to release the EP Kill Factory on Fake Four Inc. Chi Chi Talken of the blog Scratched Vinyl rated the EP an 8/10, stating that "Kill Factory comes with that heat and doesn't let up until it's over. Dope Knife and Factor Chandelier have great chemistry together, and they've created a sound that is unique unto the EP. It's a fun and rewarding listen."

In addition to his musical career, Dope Knife hosts the iHeartRadio podcast "Waiting on Reparations", alongside fellow rapper Linqua Franqa.

== Discography ==
Studio albums

- 2000 Yard Stare (2007)
- Iconoclast (2014)
- NineteenEightyFour (2017)
- Things Got Worse (2019)

Collaborative albums

- Dope Sandwich - The Walking Sick (2007)
- Happy Thoughts - Happy Thoughts (2016)

EPs

- SMASH (2015)
- Weekend At Brodie's (2016)
- Kill Factory (2020) with Factor Chandelier

Singles

- Memory Hole (2017)

Guest appearances

- Zak G - "Obey. Conform. Consume. Sleep." from Wasteland (2014)
- III - "Bar Gumbo" from Bonus Features (2017)
- Factor Chandelier - "Long Game" from First Storm (2020)
- Factor Chandelier - "Moonwalk" from Time Invested II (2022)
