= Big Cats (producer) =

- Also known as: Big Cats!
- Born: Spencer Wirth-Davis
- Origin: Minneapolis, Minnesota, US
- Genres: Alternative hip-hop, instrumental hip-hop, underground hip-hop
- Occupations: Producer, musician
- Years active: 2008–present
- Label: Speakeasy/Tru Ruts
- Website: bigcatsbeats.com

Spencer Wirth-Davis, better known by his stage name Big Cats (sometimes styled Big Cats!), is an American underground hip-hop producer from Minneapolis, Minnesota. He has produced full-length collaboration albums with artists such as Guante, The Tribe, and Toki Wright.

== Discography ==
Solo
- Sleep Tapes. (2008)
- For My Mother (2012)
- Lesser Lights (2013) [EP]
- What If It Doesn't Get Better? (2016)
- Most Days (2017) [EP]
- Long Way (2018) [EP]
- A Movie About the End of the World, Set in 1990s Las Vegas (2021)
- The Race to Alaska (2023) [film soundtrack]
- Yeah. I See It. (2023)
- Happy to See Me (2025)

with Guante
- Start a Fire (2009) [EP]
- An Unwelcome Guest (2009)
- Don't Be Nice (2010) [mixtape]
- You Better Weaponize (2012)
- We Are Waking Up in Our Caskets (2018) [compilation]
- War Balloons (2018)
- All Dressed Up, No Funeral (2024)

with The Tribe (TruthBeTold & DJ Pete)
- Supply and Demand: The EP (2009) [EP]
- The Let's Be Professional Mixtape (2010) [mixtape]
- Forward Thinkers, Movers, Shakers (2011)
- Make Good (2011)
- Space (2012)

Catsax (Big Cats with Nelson Devereaux & Miguel Hurtado)
- Catsax (2015)
- Catsax (2017) [EP]
- 2 (2015)

with Toki Wright
- Prelude to Pangaea (2014) [EP]
- Pangaea (2014)
- dB (2019) [EP]

with Chance York
- Highest Self (2016) [EP]
- Deep Dark Hope (2018)

with Lydia Liza
- Oh Boy (2020)
- Oh Wow (2023) [EP]

Other collaborations
- The Polar Bear Rug (2015) [EP] (with Homeless)
- Detail (2015) (by Eric Mayson, produced by Big Cats)
- A-OK (2019) [EP] (with Dwynell Roland)
