= Personal Journals =

Studio album by Sage Francis
- Released: April 16, 2002
- Genre: Hip-hop
- Length: 59:01
- Label: Anticon
- Producers: Sixtoo, DJ Mayonnaise, Jel, Scott Matelic, Reanimator, Alias, Odd Nosdam, Controller 7, Mr. Dibbs, Joe Beats

Sage Francis chronology
Personal Journals (2002)	A Healthy Distrust (2005)

Singles from Personal Journals
- 1. "Climb Trees" Released: 2002

Personal Journals is the first solo studio album by American rapper Sage Francis. It was released on Anticon in 2002. It peaked at number 8 on CMJ's Hip-Hop chart. As of 2005, it has sold 36,000 units.

== Critical reception ==
Professional ratings
Review scores
Source	Rating
AllMusic	4/5 stars
Christgau's Consumer Guide	(1-star Honorable Mention)
Dusted Magazine	favorable
Pitchfork	8.7/10
RapReviews.com	9.5/10
Spin	7/10
Stylus Magazine	A−
Vibe	3/5 stars

Chris Dahlen of Pitchfork gave the album an 8.7 out of 10, saying, "Personal Journals is a success because it turns the self-examination into poetry and then, harder still, turns the poems into great rap." Stanton Swihart of AllMusic gave the album 4 stars out of 5, saying, "The soundscapes that his team of producers came up with are every bit as unorthodox and superlative." Clay Jarvis of Stylus Magazine gave the album a grade of "A−," calling it "the finest hip hop album of this year."

Daniel Thomas-Glass of Dusted Magazine said, "The combination of Sage Francis's boldly self-searching poetry with the beats of some of underground hip hop's most talented producers is out-and-out breathtaking, from the opener 'Crack Pipes,' that brilliantly flips Sixtoo's impossible-to-rhyme-over beat from his instrumental opus The Secrets That Houses Keep, to the closing bars of 'Runaways,' the Joey Beats-produced outro that is quite haunting in its beauty."

== Track listing ==
No.	Title	Producer(s)	Length
1.	"Crack Pipes"	Sixtoo	2:25
2.	"Different"	Sixtoo	3:20
3.	"Personal Journalist"	DJ Mayonnaise	2:53
4.	"Inherited Scars"	DJ Mayonnaise	4:35
5.	"Climb Trees"	Jel	3:57
6.	"Broken Wings"	Scott Matelic	3:59
7.	"The Strange Famous Mullet Remover"	Reanimator	2:39
8.	"Smoke and Mirrors"	Jel	3:13
9.	"Message Sent"	Alias	4:24
10.	"Eviction Notice"	Odd Nosdam	3:31
11.	"Pitchers of Silence"	Sixtoo	2:46
12.	"Specialist"	Controller 7	4:13
13.	"Hopeless"		1:12
14.	"Kill Ya' Momz"	Mr. Dibbs	1:59
15.	"Black Sweatshirt"	Sixtoo	2:08
16.	"Cup of Tea"	Sixtoo	2:14
17.	"My Name Is Strange"		3:21
18.	"Runaways"	Joe Beats	6:07

== Personnel ==
Credits adapted from liner notes.

- Sage Francis – vocals, recording, mixing, cover art design
- Sixtoo – production (1, 2, 11, 15, 16), recording, mixing
- DJ Mayonnaise – production (3, 4)
- Jel – production (5, 8)
- Scott Matelic – production (6)
- Reanimator – production (7)
- Alias – production (9)
- Odd Nosdam – production (10), layout
- Controller 7 – production (12)
- Mr. Dibbs – production (14), recording, mixing
- Joe Beats – production (18)
- DJ Mek – turntables (3)
- DJ Signify – turntables (7, 8)
- Mike 2600 – turntables (7)
- Grey Matter – turntables (15)
- Jay Peters – guitar (17)
- Matt Zimmerman – upright bass (17)
- Tara – keyboards (17)
- Matt Coolige – flute (17)
- Scott Begin – drums (17)
- Shalem B – turntables (17)
- Chris Warren – recording, mixing
- Jonathan Wyman – mastering
- Kara Healy – photography
