= Makeshift Patriot =

Makeshift Patriot EP

EP by Sage Francis
- Released: 2003
- Recorded: October 2001
- Genre: Hip-hop
- Length: 25:47
- Label: Anticon
- Producer: DJ MF Shalem

Sage Francis chronology
| Personal Journals (2003) | ''Makeshift Patriot EP'' (2003) | Sick of Waiting Tables (2004) |

Makeshift Patriot is an EP by Sage Francis. The title track was originally released as a free MP3 on the day it was written and recorded, October 11, 2001. The track is a comment on the American media and its response to the September 11, 2001 attacks. The lyrics are written from first hand experience, worked into the track are recordings from Francis' visit to Ground Zero five days after the attack. The song can also be found on the Known UnSoldier "Sick Of Waging War..." CD.

== Track listing ==
All tracks are written by Sage Francis.

Side A
| No. | Title | Length |
|---|---|---|
| 1. | "Narcissist" | 3:14 |
| 2. | "Mourning Aftermath" | 3:41 |
| 3. | "Makeshift Patriot" | 5:50 |

Side B
| No. | Title | Length |
|---|---|---|
| 1. | "Hang Time" | 4:04 |
| 2. | "Every Midnight" | 4:54 |
| 3. | "Hey Bobby" | 3:54 |

== Influences ==
The track "Makeshift Patriot" samples "He Likes It" a song by The McCoys from their 1968 album The Infinite McCoys.

== See also ==
- List of anti-war songs
