= An Unwelcome Guest =

Studio album by Guante & Big Cats!
- Released: December 10, 2009
- Recorded: 2008–2009
- Genre: Hip-hop
- Label: Tru Ruts / Speakeasy Records
- Producer: Big Cats!

Guante & Big Cats! chronology
Start a Fire (2009)	An Unwelcome Guest (2009)	Don't Be Nice (2010)

Guante chronology
Return to El Guante's Haunted Studio Apartment (2009)	An Unwelcome Guest (2009)	Don't Be Nice (2010)

An Unwelcome Guest is a 2009 concept album by the hip-hop artists Guante and Big Cats!. The album relates social and political issues such as immigration, conspiracy and violence in a zombie apocalypse narrative.

== Track listing ==
No.	Title	Producer(s)	Length
1.	"Stories"	Big Cats!	0:56
2.	"If It Bleeds, It Leads"	Big Cats!	4:29
3.	"The National Anthem" (featuring Haley Bonar)	Big Cats!	3:35
4.	"The Stockholm Syndrome" (featuring Big Quarters & Prolyphic)	Big Cats!	5:12
5.	"Raindrops in a Hurricane"	Big Cats!	3:00
6.	"No Capes"	Big Cats!	4:06
7.	"Welcome to the Border" (featuring Chastity Brown)	Big Cats!	4:07
8.	"With Great Power"	Big Cats!	3:12
9.	"A Hug from a Stranger"	Big Cats!	3:17
10.	"Red States"	Big Cats!	3:22
11.	"Dragons"	Big Cats!	3:27
12.	"Like the Dead Running"	Big Cats!	1:46
13.	"Yes, God Is a DJ; No, Not a Good One" (featuring Eric Blair)	Big Cats!	4:23
14.	"The Damp, Foggy Midnight"	Big Cats!	3:34
15.	"End Credits"	Big Cats!	0:59
