= Educated Consumers =

American hip hop duo

- Origin: Maryland, United States
- Genres: Hip hop
- Years active: 1990–2012
- Label: Crushkill Recordings
- Members: Seez Mics; T.E.C.k!

Educated Consumers was an American hip hop duo from College Park, Maryland consisting of rapper Seez Mics (Cole Policy) and producer T.E.C.k! (Jason Fields). The group has released five studio albums and three extended plays. After breaking up in 2012, Seez Mics went on to pursue solo efforts and released Cruel Fuel in 2014.

== History ==
The group first came to the attention of hip hop fans when Seez Mics had participated in freestyle battles such as Scribble Jam, when he battled artists such as Alias and Rhymefest. Educated Consumers released the album, Educated Consumers, in 2001. The group's final album, Winning Winter, was released in 2012. The group has toured with well-known artists such as Sage Francis and Eyedea & Abilities.

== Discography ==
=== Studio albums ===
- Educated Consumers (2000)
- Aisle 2 (2002)
- Write/Hear (2007)
- Hello Big Mama (2009)
- Winning Winter (2012)

=== EPs ===
- The Waiting Room (2008)
- Summer Sampler (2010)
- New Skin Old Bones (2011)
