= Jared Paul =

Jared Paul is an American artist manager and live entertainment producer. He manages artists including New Kids on the Block, Big Time Rush and Lea Michele. His company, Faculty, has put on a number of touring productions in recent years, including Dancing with the Stars: Live!, America’s Got Talent Live!, Boston Strong and GLEE Live! as well as tours for artists including the Total Package Tour featuring NKOTB, Boyz II Men and Paula Abdul. He is also involved in the upcoming Happy Place pop-up in Los Angeles.
