= Guante =

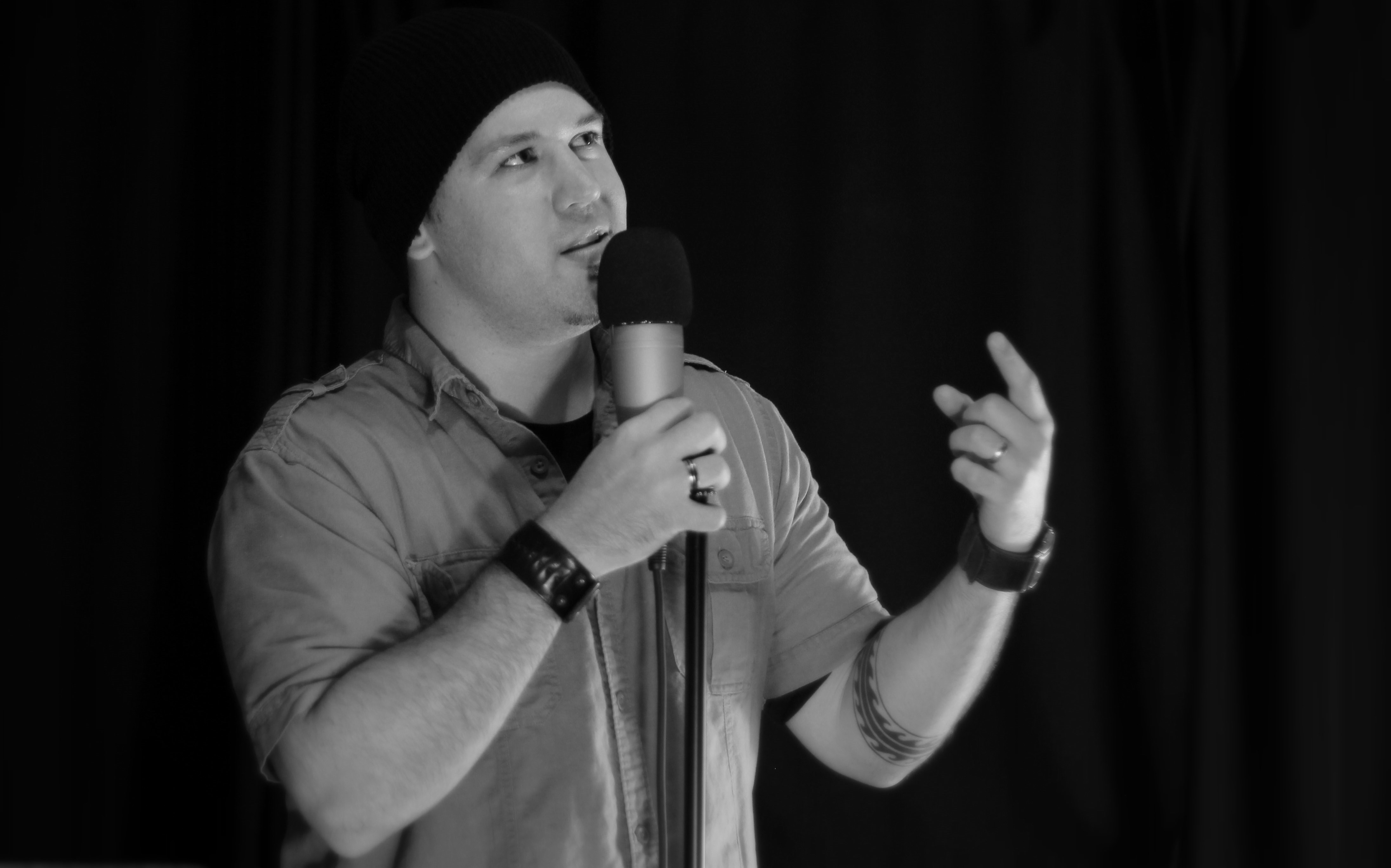
- Guante performing in 2010

Background information
- Also known as: El Guante
- Born: Kyle Tran Myhre; January 23, 1983 (age 43)
- Origin: Minneapolis, Minnesota, United States
- Genres: Hip-hop, alternative hip-hop, spoken word
- Occupations: Rapper, poet, educator
- Years active: 2003–present
- Label: Tru Ruts / Speakeasy Records
- Website: www.guante.info

Kyle Tran Myhre (born January 23, 1983), better known by his stage name Guante, is an American hip-hop recording artist, national slam poet champion (2008-2009), activist and educator based in Minneapolis, Minnesota.

Myhre's work has been published in Upworthy, MSNBC, Racialicious, Feministing, The Progressive, City Pages, Artists of the Year list and URB magazine's "Next 1000" list. He has also appeared on Minnesota Public Radio. Much of Guante's music explores social justice issues such as poverty, greed and discrimination.

== Musical career ==
Tran Myhre started in the performing arts using Guante (or El Guante) as a stage name in the early 2000s. Since the beginning of his performance career he has spoken out about sexism, racism, homophobia, and social justice issues through his spoken word poetry and hip-hop. As a hip-hop artist, he has collaborated with Minneapolis locals Haley Bonar, Kristoff Krane and No Bird Sing, and is a member of the group Sifu Hotman with the rapper Dem Atlas and the producer Rube. Big Cats! produced his albums, An Unwelcome Guest and You Better Weaponize. Myhre founded the MN Activist Project.

Tran Myhre describes his talents as a combination of spoken-word and hip-hop. He says, "Most of the residency work I do revolves around spoken-word. For people who may not know, "spoken-word" is kind of an umbrella term for performance poetry—it incorporates elements of poetry, theater, storytelling and other forms." He was Community Programs in the Arts artist of the month in April 2014.

== Activism and education ==
Tran Myhre spends time teaching writing workshops and poetry seminars to young people with an emphasis on community. He is on the teaching roster at the Community Programs in the Arts (COMPAS), an organization that teaches people of all ages about various forms of art. Within the COMPAS program, he teaches poetry and spoken word to high school and middle school students.

Tran Myhre describes his commitment and motivation to the COMPAS program. "It's really about access. I can play shows and sell CDs as Guante, but COMPAS facilitates my sharing my work with thousands of young people whom I would never have met otherwise. I like to think that they get something out of it, but I know that I get something out of it-- exposure to a new audience, the opportunity to spread this art form that I really believe in, the energy that comes from working with youth, and much more."

Tran Myhre is passionate about implementing arts into education. "Students who are engaged in the arts are more engaged in general. They become better critical thinkers. They enjoy life more. We have to think about education more holistically," he says. "For all the practical applications of arts techniques, there are some incredibly important intangibles on the table as well. You can use hip hop to teach a kid math, but you can also use hip hop to save a kid's life. Learning about spoken-word is never just about writing poems; it's about critical thinking, leadership, civic engagement, identity formation, having an expressive outlet, and a million other things."

== Discography ==
Albums

- Is This What It's Supposed to Be Like? (2003)
- Vanishing Point (2004)
- El Guante's Haunted Studio Apartment (2008)
- Return to El Guante's Haunted Studio Apartment (2009) (with See More Perspective, as Wake the City)
- An Unwelcome Guest (2009) (with Big Cats)
- You Better Weaponize (2012) (with Big Cats)
- Embrace the Sun (2014) (with Dem Atlas & Rube, as Sifu Hotman)
- Post-Post-Race (2016) (with Katrah-Quey)
- War Balloons (2018) (with Big Cats)
- All Dressed Up, No Funeral (2024) (with Big Cats)

EPs

- Start a Fire (2009) (with Big Cats)
- A Loud Heart (2011) (with Claire Taubenhaus, as A Loud Heart)
- Sifu Hotman (2013) (with Dem Atlas & Rube, as Sifu Hotman)
- Spring Is Coming (2026) (with See More Perspective, as Secret Rivers)

Mixtapes

- Conscious Is Not Enough (2008) (with See More Perspective)
- Don't Be Nice (2010) (with Big Cats)
- Conscious Is Not Enough 2011 (2011)
- Dungeons (2014)
- A Furious Vexation (2017)

Compilations

- Extra Life (2011)
- A Love Song, a Death Rattle, a Battle Cry (2015)
- We Are Waking Up in Our Caskets (2018) (with Big Cats)

== See also ==
- Midwest hip-hop
- Twin Cities hip-hop

== Bibliography ==
- Shotgun Samurai Vampire Hip Hop (2007)
- A Love Song, a Death Rattle, a Battle Cry (2018)
- Not a Lot of Reasons to Sing, But Enough (2022)
