= Joe Beats =

- Joe Beats (left) and Blak (right) performing live

Background information
- Born: Joe DelCarpini; October 4, 1977 (age 48)
- Origin: Providence, Rhode Island, United States
- Genres: Hip hop
- Occupation: Producer
- Years active: 1999–present
- Labels: Lex Records; Bully Records; Twenty Four Seven Records; Strange Famous Records
- Website: www.joeybeats.com

Joe Beats (born Joe DelCarpini, October 4, 1977) is an American hip hop producer from Rhode Island. He is best known as the co-producer for the duo Non-Prophets.

DelCarpini was born in Warwick, Rhode Island.

== Collaborative efforts ==
=== Non-Prophets ===
Non-Prophets is a pairing of lyricist Sage Francis and beatmaker Beats. The duo came to attention with their first single, the "Drop Bass" b/w "Bounce" on Emerge Music in 1999. The follow-up release in 2000 was the "All Word, No Play" vinyl single. Francis’ self-released "Sick Of" series also included some Non-Prophets material.

Their first album, Hope was released on Lex Records in October 2003. The album was praised almost unanimously by critics. It received a rating of 9.2 out of a possible 10 on Pitchfork Media. Hope was also nominated by Neil Strauss for the Shortlist Music Prize of 2004.

In early 2004, they toured the United States on the infamous 40-city Fuck Clear Channel tour.

=== Joe Beats & Blak ===
Joe Beats & Blak came together during significant pauses in both of their former groups (Non-Prophets and One Drop).

Despite living over 1200 miles apart in Rhode Island and Florida, the new duo have already embarked on two tours, releasing an EP in the process. Joe Beats & Blak are now in the process of creating their first LP.

== Solo career ==
Most of Beat’s solo efforts are presented in a continuous mix; one track transitions into the next without any pauses. With the exception of Indie Rock Blues, a mix using indie rock tracks, Beats’ projects usually contain raw hip hop instrumentals originally intended for MCs to rap over. A vocal version of Diverse Recourse's "Friday Afternoon" is featured on Ambidex's The Great Potato Famine.

== Discography ==
=== with Non-Prophets ===
see Non-Prophets#Discography

=== Solo ===
==== Albums ====
Album information
Reverse Discourse
- Released: February 2003
- Label: Strange Famous Records
- Abstract: Joe Beats' unclaimed emcee instrumentals compiled in an unpaused mix.
Indie Rock Blues
- Released: November 15, 2005
- Label: Twenty Four Seven Records
- Singles: "Coxcomb Red (Remix)"
- Abstract: Joe Beats remixes his favorite Indie Rock songs.
Diverse Recourse
- Released: April 10, 2007
- Label: Bully Records
- Abstract: The grittier sequel to 2003’s killer Reverse Discourse.
Strategery
- Released: June 26, 2007
- Label: Cozy Music
- Abstract: The beginning of a new collaboration.

==== 12" singles ====
Album information
Joe Beats Hellfire (Remix)
- Released: October 2006
- Label: Superbro Records
- Abstract: Joe Beats remixes Cunninlynguists' Hellfire off their album A Piece Of Strange.

==== 7" singles ====
Album information
"Love, Love, Love"
- Released: October 2005
- Label: Goodfoot Records
- Abstract: Various beat compilation release with the lead single featuring Sage Francis and Anonjondoe.
"Don't Front, I'm Yo Trophy"
- Released: October 2006
- Label: Shake It Records
- Abstract: Split 7" with Maker.
Fade
- Released: February 2007
- Label: Bully Records
- Abstract: Lead single to Beats' album Diverse Recourse.
