= Life (Sage Francis album) =

Li(f)e

Studio album by Sage Francis
- Released: May 11, 2010
- Studios: Engine, Chicago, Illinois
- Genre: Hip-hop
- Length: 47:50
- Label: Anti-
- Producer: Brian Deck

Sage Francis chronology
Human the Death Dance (2007)	Li(f)e (2010)	Copper Gone (2014)

Singles from Li(f)e
- 1. "Slow Man" Released: March 30, 2010; 2. "The Best of Times" Released: April 22, 2010

Li(f)e is the fourth solo studio album by American rapper Sage Francis. It was released on Anti- on May 11, 2010. It peaked at number 145 on the Billboard 200 chart. The cover art was created by Shepard Fairey. "Slow Man" and "The Best of Times" were released as the singles from the album.

== Critical reception ==
Professional ratings
Aggregate scores
Source	Rating
Metacritic	68/100
Review scores
Source	Rating
AllMusic	3.5/5 stars
The A.V. Club	B−
Consequence of Sound	D−
HipHopDX	4.0/5
Pitchfork	6.3/10
PopMatters	6/10 stars
RapReviews	7.5/10
Slant Magazine	2/5 stars
Tiny Mix Tapes	2.5/5 stars
URB	4.5/5 stars

At Metacritic, which assigns a weighted average score out of 100 to reviews from mainstream critics, the album received an average score of 68, based on 15 reviews, indicating "generally favorable reviews".

Brett Uddenberg of URB gave the album 4.5 stars out of 5, saying, "Backed by an unusual consortium of indie rockers, Rhode Island's finest dissects the human condition with brutal honesty and unparalleled wit." Meanwhile, Jesse Cataldo of Slant Magazine gave the album 2 stars out of 5, describing it as "a collection of songs that never fully gets off the ground, spooling out like never-ending spoken introductions, as the rapper futilely waits for his beats to come to life."

== Track listing ==
No.	Title	Writer(s)	Length
1.	"Little Houdini"	Sage Francis, Jason Lytle	6:46
2.	"Three Sheets to the Wind"	Francis, Chris Walla	3:31
3.	"I Was Zero"	Francis, Richard Terfry, Brian Deck, Tim Rutili, Jim Becker, Gordon Patriarca	4:18
4.	"Slow Man"	Francis, Joey Burns, John Convertino	3:38
5.	"Diamonds and Pearls"	Francis, Thomas Hagerman, Shawn Gilbert, Jeanie Schroder, Nicholas Iurata	4:02
6.	"Polterzeitgeist"	Francis, Rutili, Becker, Deck	4:05
7.	"The Baby Stays"	Francis, Rutili	3:41
8.	"16 Years"	Francis, Kurt Read, Deck, Rutili, Becker, Patriarca	3:45
9.	"Worry Not"	Francis, Tim Fite	3:19
10.	"London Bridge"	Francis, Walla	2:10
11.	"Love the Lie"	Francis, Mark Linkous	3:13
12.	"The Best of Times"	Francis, Yann Tiersen	5:31

== Personnel ==
Credits adapted from liner notes.

- Sage Francis – vocals
- Brian Deck – production, mixing
- Greg Calbi – mastering
- Shepard Fairey – artwork

== Charts ==
Chart (2010)	Peak position
US Billboard 200	145
US Top R&B/Hip-Hop Albums (Billboard)	28
US Independent Albums (Billboard)	29
