= Strange Famous Records =

- Founded: 1996
- Founder: Sage Francis
- Distributors: Revolver Music; Redeye Distribution
- Genre: Hip-hop, alternative hip-hop
- Country of origin: U.S.
- Location: Providence, Rhode Island
- Official website: strangefamousrecords.com

Strange Famous Records is an indie hip-hop record label based in Providence, Rhode Island. It was founded by Sage Francis. Artists on its roster include B. Dolan, Cecil Otter, Prolyphic, and Sleep, among others.

== History ==
Strange Famous Records started out in 1996 as a way for Sage Francis to release music. Originally this involved tape dubbing and photocopying covers. In 1999, while working at the radio station WRIU (90.3 FM), he was allowed access to the station's computers and CD-Rs replaced the tapes. The albums were sold locally, raising money to press CDs at a manufacturing plant.

In late 2005, Strange Famous Records enlisted the help of outside parties to create an online webstore www.strangefamousrecords.com. The online store was soon developed and a mail order business was set into effect. This was a "cash only" postal mail service. The catalogue expanded into shirts, sweatshirts, vinyl, stickers, buttons and eventually other artists' projects.

In 2006, Strange Famous Records added a lot to its catalogue. They included not only Sage Francis items (such as Life is Easy and Road Tested), but items from people who work closely with SFR, including Solillaquists of Sound, B. Dolan, Grand Buffet, Sole, Alias, Reanimator, Prolyphic among others.

Buck 65's album Situation which was produced by Skratch Bastid was released on Strange Famous Records on October 30, 2007. dan le sac vs Scroobius Pip's album Angles was released in the United States and Canada on SFR in 2008. B. Dolan's album The Failure and Prolyphic and Reanimator's album The Ugly Truth were both released on SFR on May 8, 2008. Sage Francis is the executive producer of both and appears on both albums.

Los Angeles rapper 2Mex signed to Strange Famous Records in 2008, and his solo album, My Fanbase Will Destroy You, was released on the label in 2010. Minneapolis hip-hop group No Bird Sing's third album, Definition Sickness, was released on the label in 2013.

== Strange Famous Digital ==
In 2016, the label launched Strange Famous Digital (often stylized as SFDigi), an online distribution where they would be able to expand their roster and push more releases, "removing as many middle men as possible." The same year, seven new artists were added to the roster.

== Roster ==
- 2Mex
- Aupheus
- B. Dolan
- BlackLiq
- Buck 65
- Buddy Peace
- Buddy Wakefield
- Cas One
- Cecil Otter
- Curtis Plum
- Dan le Sac vs Scroobius Pip
- Dope KNife
- Duncan Jewett
- Figure
- Jesse The Tree
- Jivin’ Scientists
- Kurtis SP
- Metermaids
- No Bird Sing
- Prayers for Atheists
- Prolyphic
- Reanimator
- Sage Francis
- Seez Mics
- Sleep
- Wheelchair Sports Camp
- Yugen Blakrok

== See also ==
- List of hip-hop record labels
- Underground hip-hop
