= Sage Francis =

American rapper (born 1976)

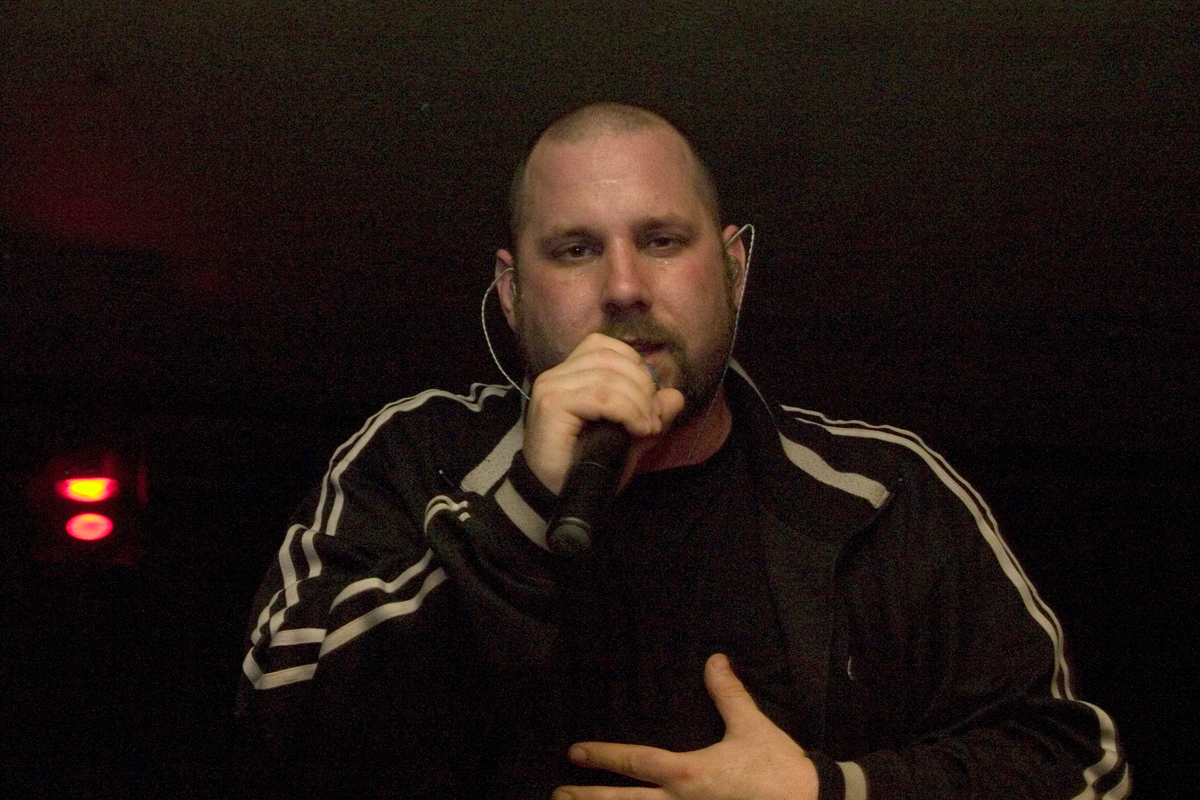
- Francis in 2007

Background information
- Also known as: Paul Francis; Xaul Zan
- Born: Paul William Francis; November 18, 1976 (age 49); Miami, Florida U.S.
- Origin: Providence, Rhode Island U.S.
- Genre: Hip-hop
- Occupation: Rapper
- Years active: 1996–present
- Labels: Strange Famous Records, Anticon, Epitaph Records, Anti-, Rhymesayers Entertainment
- Website: Sage Francis at Strange Famous Records

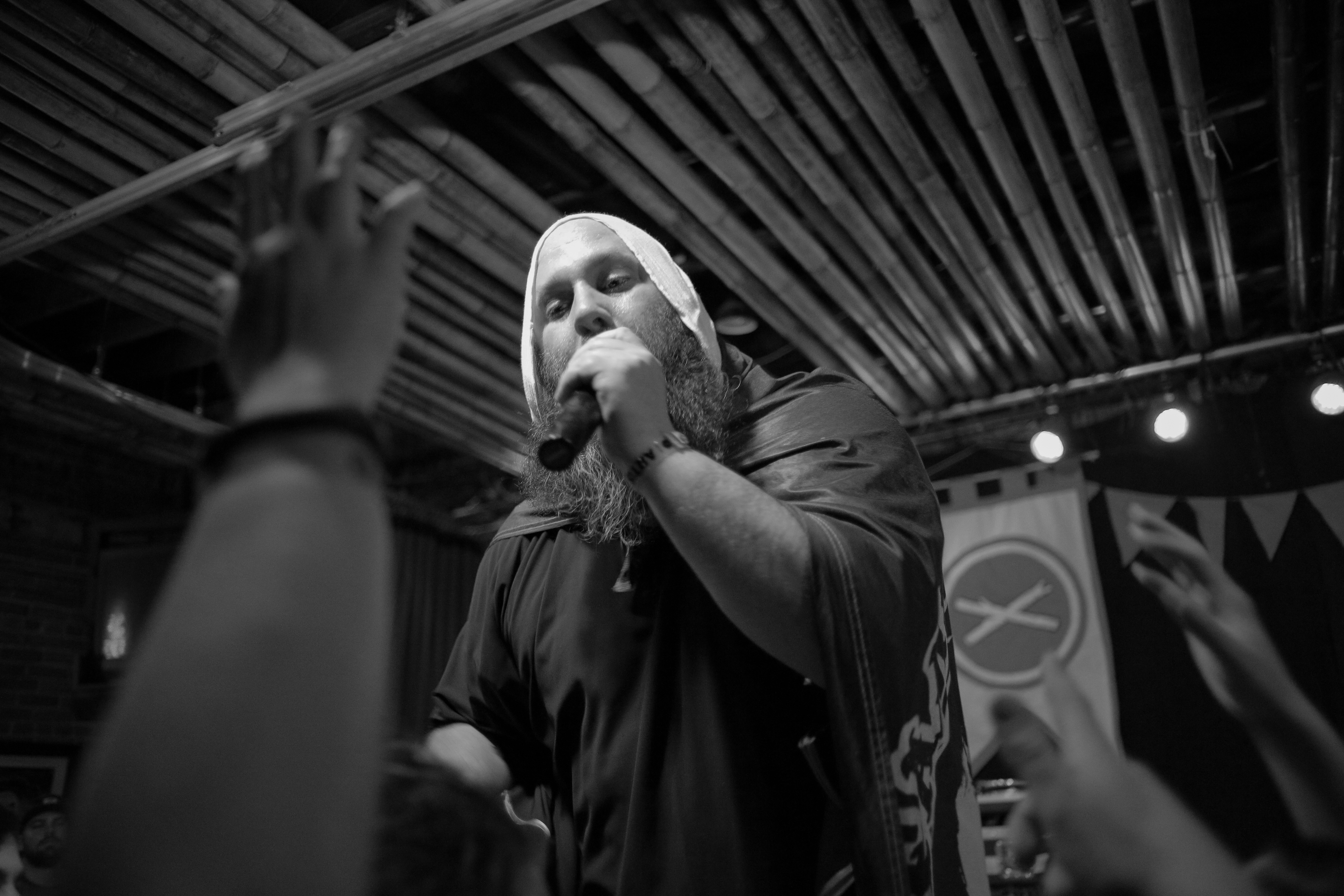
Sage Francis performing at the 2013 Treefort Music Fest

Paul William "Sage" Francis (born November 18, 1976) is an American independent underground rapper from Providence, Rhode Island. He is the founder and CEO of Strange Famous Records.

== Early life and education ==
Francis was born in Miami, Florida, but grew up in Providence, Rhode Island. He is an only child and grew up for most of his childhood with his mother and stepfather after his parents divorced when he was young. He lived in different parts of Rhode Island including North Smithfield and Woonsocket. His mom worked as a bartender and his stepfather worked as a locksmith.

Francis began writing and recording original lyrics at age 8, being inspired by acts such as Run DMC and Public Enemy. According to Artistdirect, Francis began sneaking out of his parents' house at age 12 to participate in rap battles.

Francis received a degree in communications from Dean College in Franklin, Massachusetts and a degree in journalism from the University of Rhode Island.

== Career ==
In 1996, he recorded his first official demo tape, and by 1998 he had a radio show on WRIU called True School Session.

Francis won the Superbowl MC Battle in Boston in 1999, beating Esoteric. Francis won the Scribble Jam emcee battle in 2000, beating Blueprint.

In 2001, the song "Makeshift Patriot," recorded on October 11, 2001, became an Internet hit for its critique of American media during and immediately following the September 11 attacks. Francis considers "Makeshift Patriot" to be the song that really made things come together for him. It was on the 2002 mix tape, The Known Unsoldier – Sick Of Waging War... and was widely circulated for free.

He released the critically acclaimed first solo album Personal Journals in 2002. The record Hope, his only album with Joe Beats released under the name Non-Prophets, was named after the state of Rhode Island's motto of hope, and was meant to be very Rhode Island-centric.

Francis broke music genre barriers by getting signed to Epitaph Records, making himself the first hip-hop artist to sign with the punk rock label. He released three albums with Epitaph: A Healthy Distrust, Human the Death Dance and Life.

Francis has described A Healthy Distrust as being a political record, which reflected his mistrust of government and big business with a focus on socio-political matters.

In May 2007, a music video of the song "Got Up This Morning" from Human the Death Dance was released. The song featured vocals by Jolie Holland and beats produced by Buck 65. The video featured cameos from B. Dolan, Brother Ali, Buck 65, Divinci from Solillaquists of Sound, Holland, Slug, and Tom Inhaler from Francis' band and Strange Famous Records

Life was a shift into a different style for Francis, focusing on spoken word and indie rock. The record featured contributions and collaborations with Califone, Chris Walla, Jason Lytle, and Mark Linkous.

Francis made a guest appearance on Bad Religion's The Empire Strikes First, on the track "Let Them Eat War".

In 2014, Francis released Copper Gone after a four-year break from touring. The album was named after the phenomenon Francis saw in his neighborhood where abandoned buildings would have their copper pipes stripped to be sold, and then tagged as "Copper Gone" to let others know that there was no copper left to steal.

Francis says that he has been releasing mix tapes consistently since 1999, and will continue to release the Sick of... mix tape series on an ongoing basis.

Francis has toured extensively, and has performed shows with Atmosphere, Brother Ali, and Eyedea & Abilities.

== Epic Beard Men ==
Francis collaborated with B. Dolan under the name Epic Beard Men. The duo's official debut single, "War on Christmas", was released in 2017. In 2018, the duo released the Season 1 EP, as well as "Five Hearts", a single from the EP. In 2019, the duo released the first studio album, This Was Supposed to Be Fun. It includes "You Can't Tell Me Shit", which became The Stranger's "Inbox Jukebox Track of the Day". The album was placed at number 20 on PopMatters' "20 Best Hip-Hop Albums of 2019" list.

== Strange Famous Records ==
Francis is the founder and CEO of the independent hip-hop record label Strange Famous Records. The label first began in 1996 as a way for him to release his previously unreleased songs in the late 1990s. It has since evolved into an official enterprise with an expanding roster of like-minded artists. He released several Sick Of mixtapes available on his website.

== Social activism ==
Francis worked with fellow rapper B. Dolan who had the idea to start an organization and website named KnowMore.org aka KnowMore: The People's Corporation Watch Project which focused on connecting consumers with social responsibility information about corporations and responsible consumerism.

Francis went to South Africa to work on solutions to AIDS in South Africa, especially in regards to children. As part of that effort he was part of a documentary on HIV in South Africa.

== Other work ==
Francis is also part of the contemporary spoken word movement. His relationship with the Providence poetry slam community (he was on their 1998, 1999 and 2002 national poetry slam teams) led to it being called "The House that Sage Francis Built." From 2000 to 2002, he also DJ-ed for the NYC-Urbana poetry slam, a weekly slam series held at the legendary punk rock venue CBGB.

== Discography ==
Studio albums

- Voice Mail Bomb Threat (1998) (with Art Official Intelligence)
- Personal Journals (Anticon, 2002)
- Hope (Lex, 2003) (with Joe Beats, as Non-Prophets)
- A Healthy Distrust (Epitaph, 2005)
- Human the Death Dance (Epitaph, 2007)
- Li(f)e (Anti-, 2010)
- Copper Gone (Strange Famous, 2014)
- This Was Supposed to Be Fun (Strange Famous, 2019) (with B. Dolan, as Epic Beard Men)
