= List of musicians from Denton, Texas =

The following is a partial list of musicians from Denton, Texas, a city in North Texas in the United States. Musicians and musical groups that began their careers in Denton, Texas—where the University of North Texas College of Music, 35 Denton, Denton Arts and Jazz Festival, and the Thin Line Fest are located—include:

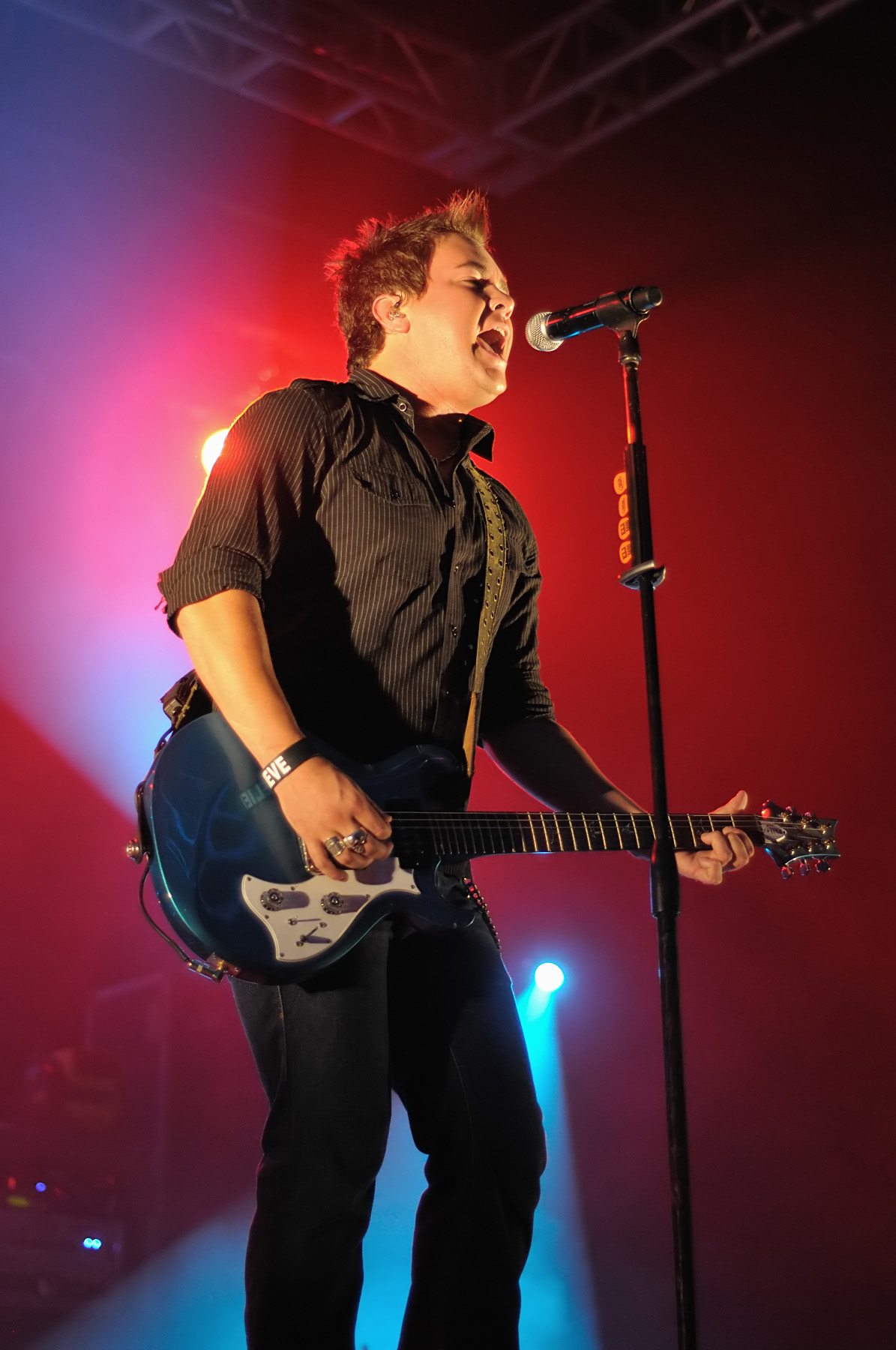
The Eli Young Band was founded in Denton.

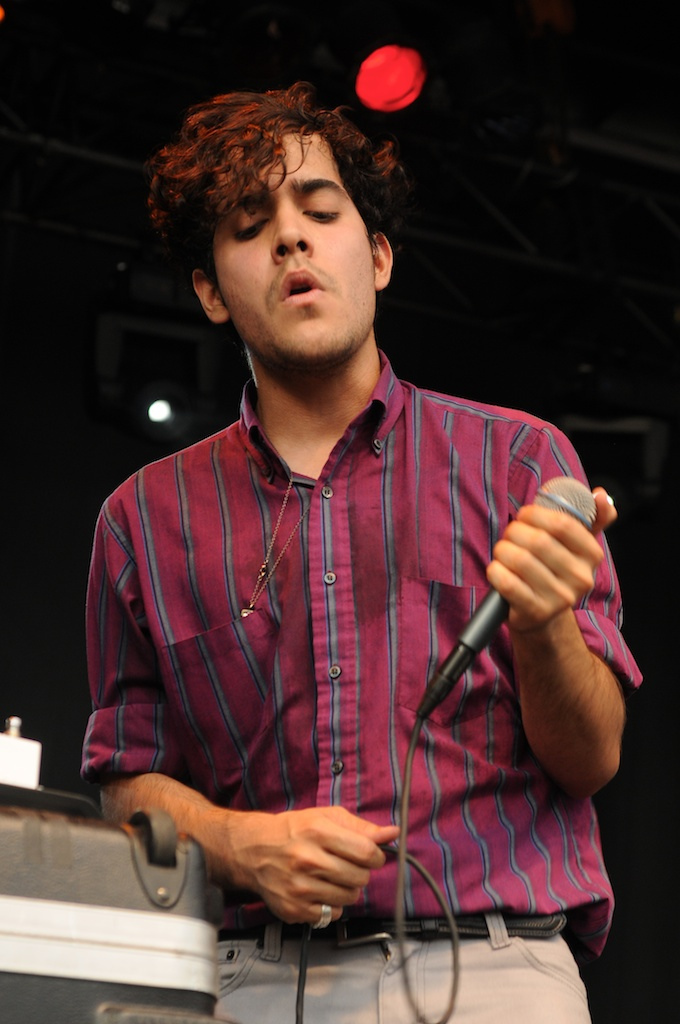
Alan Palomo of Neon Indian, a band founded in Denton

- Andrew Savage
- Baboon
- The Baptist Generals
- Bosque Brown
- Bowling for Soup
- Brave Combo
- Brutal Juice
- Centro-Matic
- Corn Mo
- Deep Blue Something
- Don Henley
- Eli Young Band
- Faktion
- Febrifuge
- Fishboy
- Flickerstick
- Lift to Experience
- The Marked Men
- Mazinga Phaser
- Meat Loaf
- Michael Martin Murphey
- Midlake
- Mingo Fishtrap
- Neon Indian
- Norah Jones
- Parquet Courts
- Pat Boone
- Polyphonic Spree
- Ralph Kirshbaum
- Ray Peterson
- Ray Wiley Hubbard
- The Riverboat Gamblers
- Robert Gomez
- The Rocket Summer
- Roy Orbison
- Sarah Jaffe
- Slobberbone
- Sly Stone
- Snarky Puppy
- Steve Fromholz
- Sub Oslo
- Teenage Cool Kids
- Ten Hands
- Tripping Daisy
- The Wee-Beasties
- William Basinski

== See also ==
- Music of Denton, Texas
- Music of Texas
- "The Best Ever Death Metal Band in Denton", a song by The Mountain Goats
