= 35 Denton =

Music festival in Texas, United States

35 Denton Music Festival
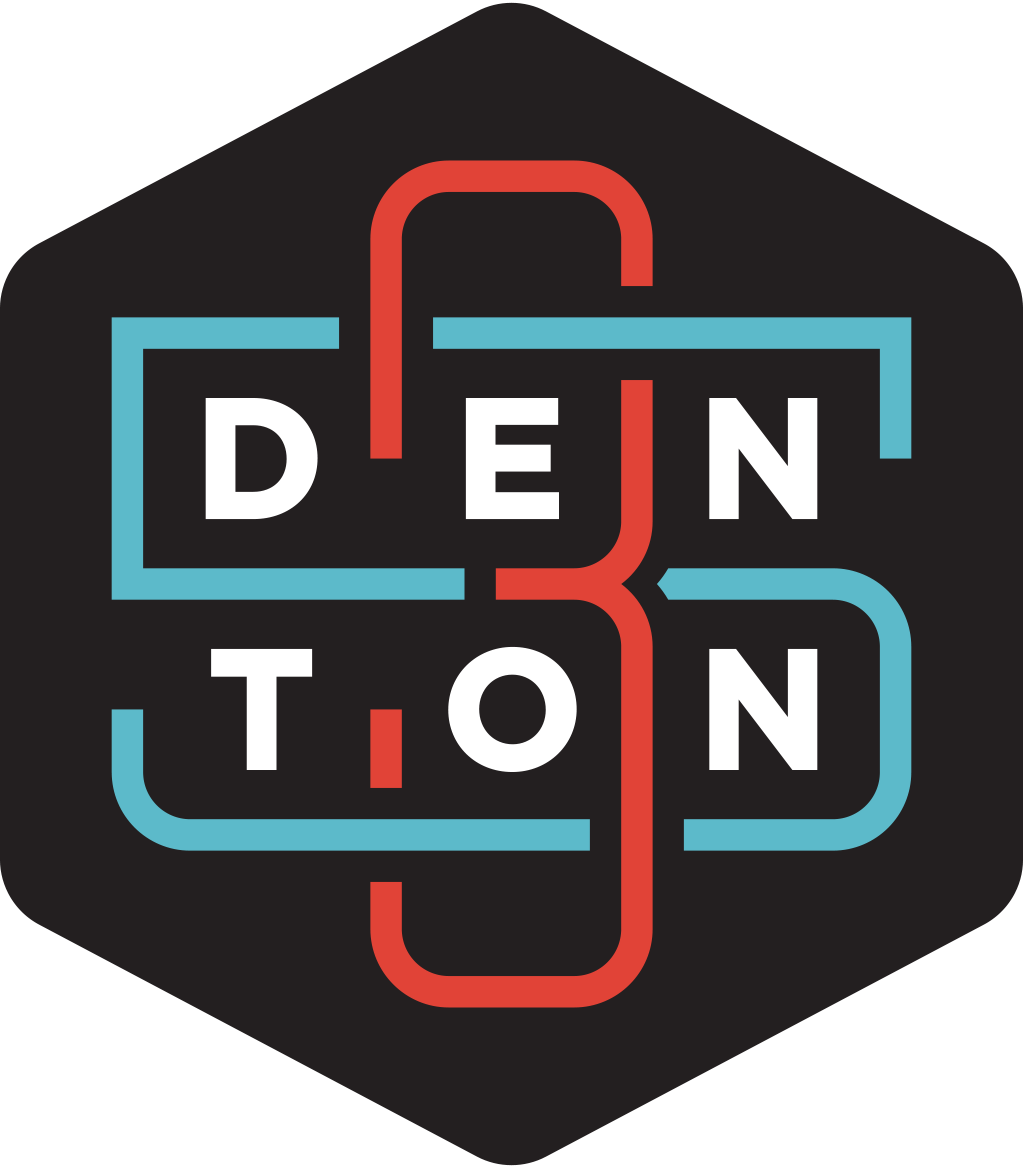
- Genre: Indie rock; Punk rock; hip hop; Americana; Pop music; Electronic music; Experimental music
- Dates: 2009-2013; 2015-2016
- Location: Denton, Texas
- Founders: Chris Flemmons of The Baptist Generals
- Website: http://35denton.com

35 Denton (formerly NX35 and 35 Conferette) was an annual 3-day music festival that took place in the burgeoning arts corridor of downtown Denton, Texas.The festival was programmed each March the week prior to the music portion of SXSW in Austin, Texas.

35 Denton was organized by a core staff of volunteers. The music festival has featured many nationally touring acts, such as Solange, The Pains of Being Pure At Heart, Local Natives, Portugal. The Man, The Flaming Lips, The Jesus and Mary Chain, The Mountain Goats, Bun B, Devin the Dude, Dr. Dog, Big Boi, Reggie Watts, The Civil Wars, Best Coast, Danny Brown, A Place to Bury Strangers, and more. Likewise, it also had a roster of notable local acts, such as Neon Indian, Midlake, Sarah Jaffe, Brave Combo, Riverboat Gamblers, Seryn, and more.

== History ==
2005 – 2008: The Austin Years

During SXSW 2005, festival founder Chris Flemmons planted the seeds of 35 Denton in the soil of Big Red Sun, a floral design boutique in Austin. Thirteen Denton acts performed on a stage in the business's outdoor garden for an invite-only crowd of international journalists and industry types. The beer was free, the Tex-Mex was homemade, and the goal was uncomplicated: Show the world what Denton's all about. Flemmons called the event NX35: The Afternoon Party of the Other, Smaller, Music Town in Texas. In 2006, it took place at Club DeVille, and in 2007 and 2008, the party moved to Momo's. Some notable performers from the event's years in Austin include Centro-matic's Will Johnson, Midlake, Sarah Jaffe, and the Baptist Generals.

2009 – 2016: The Denton Years

In 2009, after four years in Austin, Flemmons and a small staff of volunteers brought the day party home and turned it into a multi-day festival. The goal of showcasing Denton's performers and people did not change, but the name did: NX35 Music Conferette, which opened with a keynote address led by American Splendor creator Harvey Pekar. Before the inaugural festival ended, more than 4000 people had watched over 120 acts play on the stages of Denton's numerous clubs and coffeeshops.

In 2010, more than 250 acts performed on and around Denton's downtown square – to an estimated audience of 20,000 people. The event began with keynote speaker Steve Albini and featured a now storied free Saturday night performance by the Flaming Lips and Denton's own Midlake at the North Texas Fairgrounds. Also instituted this year was daytime programming with speakers and panels addressing a broad range of topics concerning cultural planning, urban development, gender issues, tech entrepreneurship, and the music, art, and film industries. This programming emerged as one of the recurring highlights of the festival. Other notable performers from this era include Neon Indian, Centro-matic, HEALTH, The Black Angels, The Baptist Generals, Brave Combo, Sarah Jaffe, Monotonix, Riverboat Gamblers, Shiny Around the Edges, and True Widow.

In 2011, the festival changed its name to 35 Conferette. The name wasn't the only big change, as the fest expanded into the streets of downtown Denton with the addition of three outdoor stages, one of which was on the courthouse lawn. Performers included a growing roster of national talent like Big Boi, Mavis Staples, Dr. Dog, Reggie Watts, Japanther, and Damien Jurado. In the months that followed, 35 Conferette was named Best Promotional Event of 2011 by the Texas Downtown Association. Festival founder Chris Flemmons handed the event's future to a new leadership staff led by Creative Director Kyle La Valley and Programming Director, Natalie Dávila. The festival's name changed to 35 Denton in July 2011.

In 2012, 35 Denton was headlined by The Jesus and Mary Chain – though they performed a few days later than anticipated. After visa issues prevented their Saturday night appearance, the band played the following Wednesday at the North Texas Fairgrounds, with Ty Segall as an opening act. Other notable 2012 acts included Built to Spill, Bun B, The Raincoats, OM, Best Coast, Thee Oh Sees, and Dum Dum Girls.

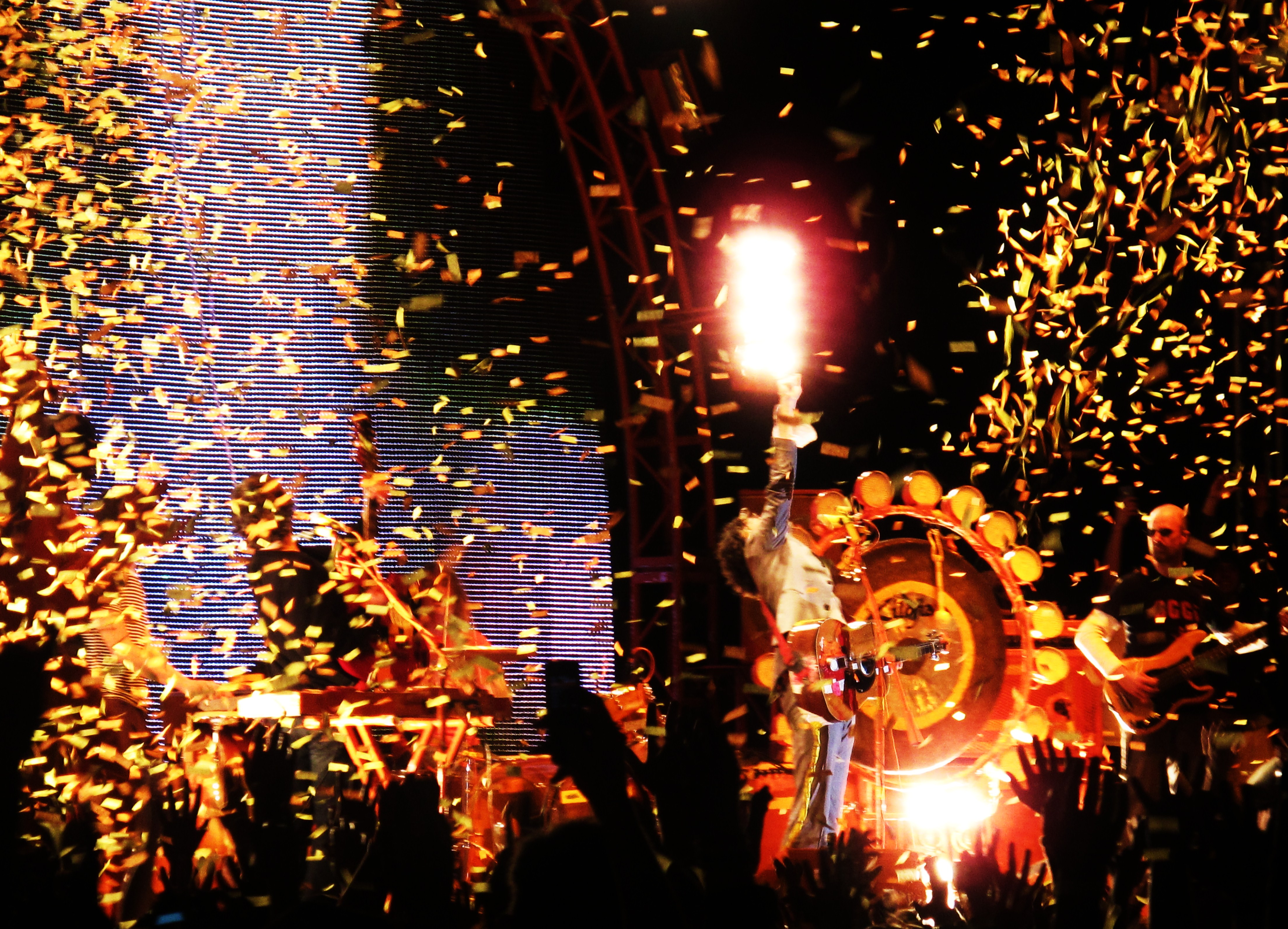
The Flaming Lips performing a free show during NX35 2010

In 2013, 35 Denton featured performances by Solange, Sleep, Roky Erickson, Com Truise, Silver Apples, Killer Mike, Thee Oh Sees, Akron/Family, Man Man, Mikal Cronin, Mac DeMarco, Beach Fossils, Reigning Sound, Marnie Stern, Soul Clap, and the live Texas debut of Thurston Moore's side-project Chelsea Light Moving.

After 2013, La Valley and Dávila left the festival leadership and the organization's primary investors withdrew funding. The festival did not take place in 2014, opting instead to take a year off to reorganize and locate new investors. During this time, a new Denton music festival in Oaktopia was formed to run opposite 35 Denton in the fall of each year.

In 2015, 35 Denton returned under the theme "Back To The Music", and featured performances by the 1970s The Zombies, Jimmie Dale Gilmore, Cymbals Eat Guitars, Chastity Belt, Lowell, Capsula, S U R V I V E, and the reunion performance of Ten Hands led by local musician Paul Slavens.

In 2016, was headlined by the soul artist Charles Bradley and his Extraordinaires, hip-hop throwback Biz Markie, and Eliot Sumner, the child of English rock musician Sting. Other notable performances were by Electric Six, Fat Tony, Class Actress, Tacocat, Sheer Mag, Alesia Lani and the Mydolls.

The 2017 event was canceled without firm plans to revive the festival.

== Evolution of a brand ==
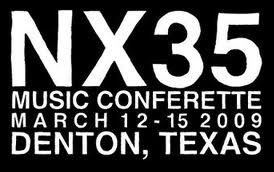
NX35 Music Conferette 2009 Banner with Logo

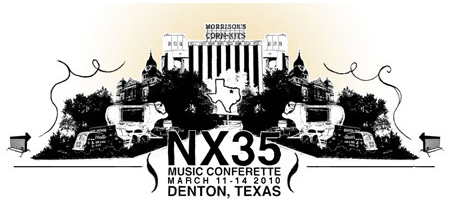
NX35 Music Conferette 2010 Banner with Logo

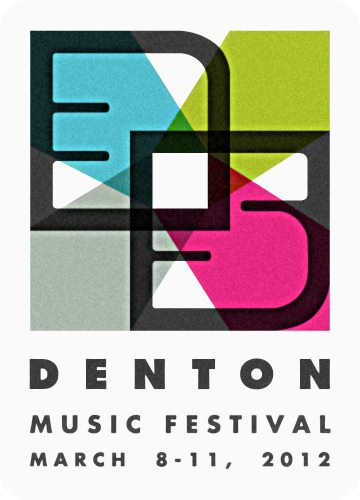
35 Denton Music Festival 2012 Logo

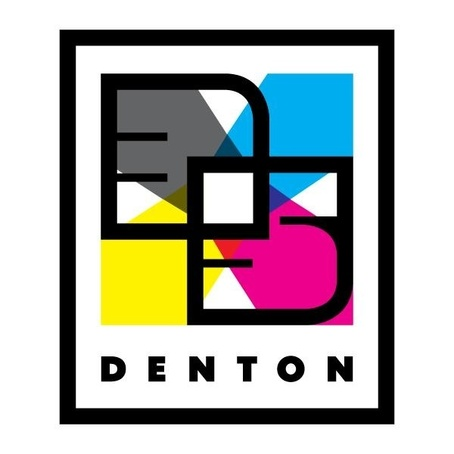
35 Denton Music Festival 2013 Logo

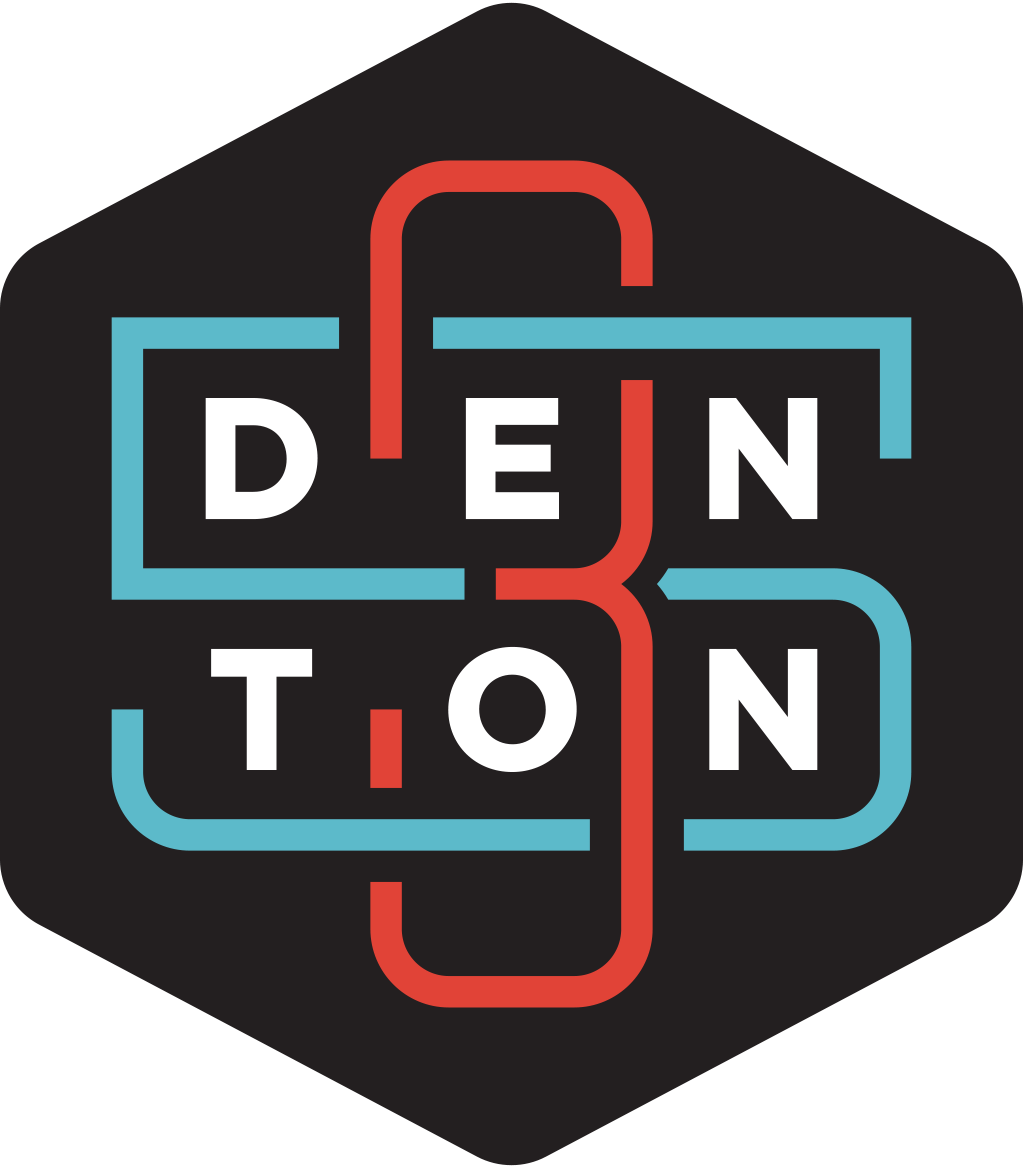
35 Denton Music Festival 2016 Logo

An interesting aspect of the festival is its evolving name and image. Each change reflected either a need to distinguish the festival from SXSW or of the evolving core staff crew that led the event.

== Lineups By Year ==
=== 2009 NX35 Conferette, March 12–15 ===
Performing Artists:
- Brave Combo
- Centro-matic
- Possessed by Paul James
- Monotonix
- James McMurtry
- Casiotone for the Painfully Alone
- Sarah Jaffe
- Tomorrowpeople
- True Widow
- Spectacle (band)
- The A.M. Ramblers
- American Werewolf Academy
- The Angelus
- beep beep (band)
- The Boom Boom Box
- Bosque Brown
- The Botticellis
- Boyfriends Inc.
- Bridges and Blinking Lights
- Doug Burr
- Chameleon Chamber Group
- Bart Davenport
- Dead Twins
- Delmore Pilcrow
- The Diamond Center
- Dirtfoot
- Dust Congress
- Electric Toy Danger
- Ella Minnow
- Febrifuge
- Fishboy
- Daniel Folmer
- Laura Gibson
- Robert Gomez
- Grassfight
- The Grey Company
- Ham1
- The Heartstring Stranglers
- The Heelers
- History At Our Disposal
- The Hudsons
- IDIGINIS
- Mathias Isassi
- KatsüK
- LA GUERRILLA
- Audrey Lapraik
- Last of the Interceptors
- Leatherwood
- Like Trains & Taxis
- Madeline
- The Mad Scientists
- The Make Believers
- Matthew and the Arrogant Sea
- Mike Miller
- Mom
- Dan Montgomery
- Moth Fight
- The Naptime Shake
- Nervous Curtains
- New Science Projects
- The Odd Primes
- Opaque
- The Orbans
- Parata
- Pinebox Serenade
- Record Hop
- Riverboat Gamblers
- RTB2
- Shiny Around the Edges
- The Show Is The Rainbow
- The Silver Arrows
- The Slow Burners
- Claire Small
- Spooky Folk
- Starhead
- Stumptone
- Sugar and Gold
- Swedish Teens
- Sybris
- Tame . . . Tame, and Quiet
- Telegraph Canyon
- The Timeline Post
- The Theater Fire
- Vortexas
- Warren Jackson Hearne and the Merrie Murdre of Gloomadeers
- We Are Villains
- Young Mammals
- The Zest of Yore

=== 2010 NX35 Conferette, March 11–14 ===
Performing Artists:
- The Flaming Lips
- Midlake
- Stardeath and White Dwarfs
- Neon Indian
- Western Vinyl
- Andrew Tinker
- Snarky Puppy
- HEALTH
- BigBang
- The Walkmen
- Sleep Whale
- Kaboom
- French Horn Rebellion
- Slobberbone
- Sarah Jaffe
- The Low Lows
- The Kissaway Trail
- Julianna Barwick
- Robert Ellis
- Pattern is Movement
- Via Audio
- The Middle East
- Fergus & Geronimo
- Pure Ecstasy
- Final Club
- This Will Destroy You
- Autumn Owls
- DJ MomJeans
- FELILI
- The POLYCORNS
- The Black Angels
- Pigeon John
- Quiet Company
- Natalia Mallo
- PVC Street Gang
- Colour Music
- Br’er
- Zorch
- Record Hop
- The Laughing
- Trebuchet
- History At Our Disposal
- Nervous Curtains
- .E
- 420 Blues
- A Shoreline Dream
- A.M. Ramblers
- Anonymous Culture
- Babar
- Baruch the Scribe
- Birds & Batteries
- Boxcar Bandits
- Bridges & Blinking Lights
- Buffalo Clover
- Caleb Ian Campbell
- Carrie Rodriguez
- Claire Morales
- Cocky Americans
- Corporate Park
- Curvette
- Damaged Good$
- Dan Montgomery
- Daniel Folmer
- Dear Human
- Delmore Pilcrow
- Dem Southernfolkz
- Dim Locator
- Doug Burr
- Doug Gillard
- Drive Like Maria
- Dust Congress
- Eaton Lake Tonics
- Electric Electric
- Evangelicals
- Feathers
- Fishboy
- Floating Action
- Florene
- Follow That Bird!
- Fox and the Bird
- Fur
- Galapaghost
- Giggle Party
- GioSafari
- Glen Farris
- Grandfather Child
- Green Corn Revival
- Guitar George Trio
- Ha Ha Tonka
- Handbrake
- Har Herrar
- Hard Times
- Harvey Sid Fisher
- Hello Lover
- Here Holy Spain
- Hog Pig
- Horse Feathers
- hotel hotel
- I Heart Lung
- I-45
- Icarus Himself
- Indian Jewelry
- Ishi
- Jack With One Eye
- Jacob Metcalf
- Jenn Gooch
- Jessie Frye
- Joe Pug
- Jookabox
- Jupiter One
- Lane & Paul
- Le Not So Hot Klub de Denton
- Little Birds
- Manned Missiles
- Mariachi Quetzal
- Math the Band
- Matthew and the Arrogant Sea
- Minorcan
- Monastery
- Moth Fight
- Mount Righteous
- Museum Creatures
- My Empty Phantom
- Native Lights
- New Science Projects
- Nicholas Altobelli
- Ola Podrida
- Orange Peel Sunshine
- Oso Closo
- Parata
- Paul Benjaman Band
- Peasant
- Peopleodian
- Pinebox Serenade
- Points North
- Pomegranates
- RTB2
- Robert Gomez
- Robot Arm
- Roy Robertson
- Saboteur
- Sabra Laval
- Sarah Reddington
- Sarah Renfro
- Seryn
- Shiny Around the Edges
- Small Time Ruffians
- Smile Smile
- Sore Losers
- Spooky Folk
- Strangers Family Band
- Summer of Glaciers
- Sunnybrook
- Telegraph Canyon
- The Angelus
- The Beaten Sea
- The Clouds Are Ghosts
- The Contingency Clause
- The Crash That Took Me
- the cut off
- The Daily Beat
- The Demigs
- The Diamond Center
- The Fieros
- The Great Tyrant
- The Hand Combine
- The Heelers
- The Jakeys
- The Lonesome Heroes
- The Naptime Shake
- The POLYCORNS
- The Phuss
- The River Mouth
- The Rocketboys
- The Shakes
- The Slow Burners
- The Terror Pigeon Dance Revolt!
- The Timeline Post
- The Virgin Wolves
- The Wellington Lights
- This Old House
- Thunder Power
- Trespassers William
- Unwed Sailor
- Vexed UK
- Warren Jackson Hearne and the Merrie Murdre of Gloomadeers
- Welcome Signs
- Western Giants
- Whiskey Folk Ramblers
- White Drugs
- Woven Bones
- Writer
- Yeahdef
- Young and Brave
- Zlam Dunk
Day Programming:

Thursday

- "DFW, the Arts, and the Future"; A Roundtable Discussion
- "Where We Hear Local Music"
- "Music Makers Mixer"

Friday

- Keynote: Steve Albini
- "From the Physical to the Digital"
- "Drink and Think: Is Midlake Better Than Miley Cyrus?"; (If, how so? If not, then what the hell are we doing?)

Saturday

- "The Ever Shifting Live Music Landscape in DFW"
- "The Changing Nature of Music Journalism"

Sunday

- "Words and Music By:"
- "40 Bands/80 Minutes!"
- "Many Songs Told"

The Eight Track Museum:
Earotica Music storeowner and music producer Bucks Burnett brought his extensive and unusual eight track collection to NX35.

The event presented rare tapes, promotional materials, and ephemera related to the popular history of the format. Materials of note within the museum collection include 500 sealed eight tracks by The Rutles (with the original shipping cartons), a three-pack eight track box set of recordings by The Beatles, and thirty sealed eight tracks by Elvis Presley (in their original RCA Records shipping carton).

In conjunction with the exhibition opening, Burnett curates a special exhibition entitled "Metal Machine Music: 35 Years" focused on the thirty-fifth anniversary of the release of Lou Reed's infamous 1975 double album, featuring eight tracks of many of Reed's legendary projects and associates, including rare sealed tapes from The Velvet Underground, Nico, and more.

=== 2011 35 Conferette, March 10–13 ===
Performing Artists:
- Big Boi
- Mavis Staples
- Local Natives
- Dr. Dog
- The Pains Of Being Pure At Heart
- !!!
- Portugal. The Man
- Gayngs
- Cut Chemist
- Reggie Watts
- Sarah Jaffe
- Secret Sisters
- Dan Deacon
- Miami Horror
- Kid Koala
- A Place to Bury Strangers
- How to Dress Well
- Esben and the Witch
- Big Freedia
- Japanther
- Damien Jurado
- Parts & Labor
- Lost In the Trees
- Pictureplane
- Viva Voce (band)
- Mister Heavenly
- Houses
- Royal Bangs
- Colour Revolt
- Nite Jewel
- Delicate Steve
- No Joy
- The Mumlers
- CoolRunnings
- Reading Rainbow
- Young Buffalo
- Pterodactyl
- Now, Now (then known as Now, Now Every Children)
- Slobberbone
- Davila666
- Mother Falcon
- Woven Bones
- Dominique Young Unique
- David Dondero
- Database
- Franz Nicolay
- Southeast Engine
- Santah
- Sugar & Gold
- Yip Deceiver
- Parachute Musical
- Possessed By Paul James
- Mondo Drag
- The Sour Notes
- Jessica Lea Mayfield
- Atlantic/Pacific
- The Holler Time
- .357 Lover
- 4th & Inches
- Achtone!
- Adventure
- Adventures in Magnetism
- Air Review
- Alphabet
- Analog Rebellion
- Anonymous Culture
- A Smile Full of Ale
- Babar
- Backside Pick
- Banda Eclipse
- Baring Teeth
- Baruch the Scribe
- Beans
- Birds & Batteries
- Blissed out
- Boom Boom Box
- Bosque Brown
- Brainstorm
- Bravo, Max!
- Broadcast Sea
- BrownChicken BrownCow StringBand
- Caleb Ian Campbell
- Clear Soul Forces
- Cleeman
- Clint Niosi
- Cocky Americans
- Crown Imperial
- Curvette
- Damaged Good$
- Danny Rush and the Designated Drivers
- Database
- Dave Smalley
- David Dondero
- David Mayfield Parade
- Dead Twins
- Dear Human
- deep Snapper
- Delmore Pilcrow
- Dem Southerfolkz
- Diamond Age
- Dim Locator
- DJ Mom Jeans
- Doug Burr
- Drew Phelps
- Dust Congress
- Eaton Lake Tonics
- El Cento
- Ella Minnow
- Fate Lions
- Final Club
- Fishboy
- Florene
- Fresh Milions
- Generationals
- Giggle Party
- Glen Farris
- Grass Widow
- Heartstring Stranglers
- Here Holy Spain
- High Tension Wires
- Hormones
- Horray 4 Earth
- Horse Thief
- Hosannas
- Hotel Hotel
- Hoyotoho
- In Tall Buildings
- Ivan and Alyosha
- J. Charles & the Trainrobbers
- Jeremy Buller
- Jessie Frye
- John Grant
- Kaboom
- Kampfgrounds
- KB and the Boo Bonic
- Land Mammals
- Leg Sweeper
- Les Americains
- Little Lo
- Lo-Fi Chorus
- Lost in the Trees
- Magnum Octopus
- Maleveller
- Maneja Beto
- Man Factory
- Manned Missiles
- Mansions
- Matthew and the Arrogant Sea
- Midnite Society
- MiniBoone
- Monahans
- Moon
- Museum Creatures
- Myopic
- Nervous Curtains
- New Science Projects
- Nicolas Altobelli
- Novaak
- Oh Lewis
- On After Dark
- Orange Peel Sunshine
- O’Death
- Paper Robot
- Paul Benjamin Band
- Peopleodian
- Pictureplace
- Pinebox Serenade
- Power Trip
- Prince Rama
- Pujol
- Pure X
- Record Hop
- Richard the Lionhearted
- Royal Thunder
- Roy Robertson
- RTB2
- Saboteur
- Sans Soleil
- Santah
- Santcus Bellum
- Sarah Renfro
- Seryn
- Sextape
- Shiny Around the Edges
- Skeleton Coast
- Somebody's Darling
- Soviet
- Sphynx
- Spooky Folk
- Spring Standards
- Sugar Glyder
- Summer Ames
- Summer of Glaciers
- Sundress
- Sun Hotel (patio)
- Survive
- Swedish Teens
- Telegraph Canyon
- The Angelus
- The Beaten Sea
- The Bizarro Kids
- The Boxcar Bandits
- The Cush
- The Demigs
- The Flowers of God
- The Hanna Barbarians
- The Hope Trust
- The Jakeys
- The League of Extraordinary Gz
- The Lonesome Heroes
- The Manichean
- The Naptime Shake
- The Non
- The Orbans
- The Panda Resistance
- The Slow Burners
- The Terror Pigeon Dance Revolt
- The Virgin Wolves
- The Wee-Beasties
- Tidal Waves
- Tiger Darrow
- Turbo Fruits
- Two Knights
- Vexed UK
- Violent Squid
- Vulgar Fashion
- Wesley Allen Hartley and the Traveling Trees
- Westboro Butchers
- Western Giants
- Western Skies
- Whiskey Folk Ramblers
- White Arrows
- White Denim
- White Mountain
- Young and Brave
- Zest of Yore
- Zorch
Day Programming:

Thursday

- "Music Business Legal Checklist: Five Things You Better Think About and Do"

Friday

- "DFW Is The New Black!""
- "Dirty Always Live Like a Soldier: Dallas' Influence on Hip-Hop"
- "Kool Thing: Women and Power in Rock and Roll"
- "What Is the Soul of the city?"; a special Drink and Think event at 35 Conferette

Saturday

- "Monetizing Music in a Free Economy -or- Music's Free... Deal with it."
- "Grammy Music Makers/New Member Mixer"

=== 2012 35 Denton, March 8–11 ===
Performing Artists:
- The Jesus and Mary Chain
- Built to Spill
- Bun B
- Best Coast
- The Mountain Goats
- Devin the Dude
- Ty Segall
- The Raincoats
- John Vanderslice
- OM
- Atlas Sound
- Thee Oh Sees
- Dum Dum Girls
- Danny Brown
- Designer Drugs
- The Hood Internet
- El Ten Eleven
- Class Actress
- Oberhofer
- Light Asylum
- Gardens & Villa
- Peaking Lights
- High Places
- G-Side
- Main Attrakionz
- Wooden Wand
- Cowboy and Indian
- Teengirl Fantasy
- Night Beats
- Bleached
- Finn Riggins
- Bare Wires
- Cities Aviv
- Julianna Barwick
- R. Stevie Moore
- Milo Greene
- The Pass
- Psychic Ills
- Pond
- The Baptist Generals
- MillionYoung
- True Widow
- Evangelicals
- White Fence
- Wet Hair
- Woodsman
- Dinosaur Feathers
- Purling Hiss
- Sleep ∞ Over
- M.A.K.U SoundSystem
- RACES
- Mikal Cronin
- Mannequin Men
- Xray Eyeballs
- Natural Child
- David Ramirez
- Psychedelic Horseshit
- American Royalty
- Aan
- the Rassle
- Chapter 24
- Danny Malone
- The Romany Rye
- Tropical Ooze
- Sun Araw
- -topic
- A.M. Ramblers
- Air Review
- An Absence of Color
- Babar
- Backwater Opera
- Bad Design
- Bad Sports
- Baruch The Scribe
- Bethan
- Boxcar Bandits
- Buxton
- Cartwright
- Clint Niosi
- Comanche
- Coves
- Cowboy Indian Bear
- Damaged Goods
- Daniel Francis Doyle
- Danny Rush and the DDs
- Diamond Age
- Dim Locator
- Doom Ghost
- Doug Burr
- Dust Congress
- Eat Avery's Bones
- Ella Minnow
- Ex Cops
- Family Friend
- Final Club
- Fishboy
- Fox and the Bird
- Hares on the Mountain
- Here Holy Spain
- The Holler Time
- Idiots
- Jack Wilson
- Jacob Metcalf
- Jay Fresh
- Jeremy Buller
- Jessie Frye
- Juve
- Kiwi Sisters
- Legsweeper
- Lily Taylor
- Magnet School
- Manned Missiles
- Mary Walker
- Mexican Lions
- Midnite Society
- Mittenfields
- Museum Creatures
- My Education
- Neeks
- New Science Projects
- Noonday Morningstar
- Old Snack
- Old Warhorse
- Onward, Soldiers
- Peopleodian
- Public Dims
- Roy Robertson
- RTB2
- Sam Robertson
- Sans Soleil
- Savaging Spires
- Schmillion
- Sealion
- Seth Sherman
- Shaolin Death Squad
- Shiny Around The Edges
- Sore Losers
- Soviet
- Spitfire Tumbleweeds
- Spookeasy
- Spooky Folk
- Summer of Glaciers
- Sundress
- Terminator 2
- The Angelus
- The Blurries
- The Boom Bang
- The Burning Hotels
- The Commodores
- The Demigs
- The Eastern Sea
- The Hope Trust
- The House Harkonnen
- The Jakeys
- The O's
- The Phuss
- The Rich Hands
- The Spectacle
- The Tontons
- The Treelines
- Treasure Hunt
- Trebuchet
- Two Knights
- Vaults of Zin
- VIDEO
- Violent Squid
- War Party
- Warren Jackson Hearne and the Leek Electronique
- Whiskey Folk Ramblers
- Wild Moccasins
- Wiretree
- Young and Brave
- Yeadef
- Zorch
Day Programming:

Thursday

- "Grammy/Entertainment Law Panel"
- "Industry Mixer"
- "Social Media Panel"

Friday

- "Booking Panel"
- "Maker's Panel"
- "Art of Rock"

Saturday

- "Get In The Van"
- "Gear & Tape Panel"
- "Words & Music"

=== The Hot Wet Mess ===
In May 2012, 35 Denton announced a one-day end of summer party to take place on September 1, 2012 entitled 'The Hot Wet Mess.' The festival's first venture into event production outside the 35 Denton festival took place at the North Texas Fairgrounds and featured Black Lips, No Age, Reggie Watts, Big Freedia, Unknown Mortal Orchestra as well as local acts Fergus & Geronimo, DJ Sober and RTB2. The event was sponsored by Vitamin Water and Corona Light, and consisted of attractions such as a water slide to overlook the stage.

=== 2013 35 Denton, March 7–10 ===
Performing Artists:
- Solange Knowles
- Sleep
- Camera Obscura
- Thurston Moore's Chelsea Light Moving
- Roky Erickson
- Beach Fossils
- Killer Mike
- Reigning Sound
- Thee Oh Sees
- Eyehategod
- Man Man
- Astronautalis
- The Spits
- Silver Apples
- Com Truise
- Akron/Family
- Born Ruffians
- The Soft Moon
- Merchandise
- Brutal Juice
- Wayne Hancock
- Prurient
- The Cannabinoids feat. Sarah Jaffe
- Expo '70
- Soul Clap Dance Off
- Scott H. Biram
- Poolside
- Mac DeMarco
- Prince Rama
- Marnie Stern
- The Ruby Suns
- Pallbearer
- White Lung
- Houndmouth
- Locrian
- Antwon
- You Won't
- Fossil Collective
- The Last Bison
- Ghost Wave
- Hey Marseilles
- Talk Normal
- The Hunters
- Gap Dream
- OBN IIIs
- Fat Tony
- Sinkane
- Audacity
- Roomrunner
- Gary War
- The Coathangers
- Destruction Unit
- Delicate Steve
- Shannon and the Clams
- Valleys
- Odonis Odonis
- True Widow
- Dustin Wong
- John Wesley Coleman
- Nu Sensae
- Cloudland Canyon
- Idiot Glee
- Whirr
- Deep Sea Diver
- K.Flay
- Kingdom
- Prince William
- L-Vis 1990
- Bok Bok
- Dana Falconberry
- Ralph White
- Brainstorm
- Jamaican Queens
- Calvin Love
- Naomi Punk
- Gypsyblood
- Summer Twins
- Burnt Ones
- Dizzy Daniel Moorehead ft. Attila Shaaran
- White Fang
- The Memories
- Pangea
- Colleen Green
- Video
- Mind Spiders
- How I Quit Crack
- -topic
- A.dD+
- A.M. Ramblers
- AV The Great
- Acid Baby Jesus
- Babar
- Bad Design
- Bad Idea
- Biographies
- Black James Franco
- Blackstone Rangers
- Blessin’
- Bosque Brown
- Boxcar Bandits
- Brutal Juice
- Buxton
- Codetalkers
- Catamaran
- Cerulean Giallo
- Communion
- Cutter
- Daniel Francis Doyle
- Danny Rush and the DD's
- Datahowler
- Deep Throat
- Def Rain
- Delmore Picrow
- Diamond Age
- Dim Locator
- Dove Hunter
- Dust Congress
- Eat Avery's Bones
- Ella Minnow
- Ethereal and The Queer Show
- Fab Deuce
- Final Club
- Fungi Girls
- Ghost to Falco
- H.I. Jr.
- Hell Shovel
- Hares on the Mountain
- Holy Wave
- Hormones
- Isaac Hoskins
- Jeremy Buller
- Jessie Frye
- Juve
- Kid Prison
- King Automatic
- La Migra
- Lily Taylor
- Little Birds
- Los Vigilantes
- Magic Milk
- Madisons
- Mariachi Quetzal
- Mary Walker
- Melting Season
- Midday Vail
- Midnite Society
- Missions
- My Education
- Nervous Curtains
- Nicholas Altobelli
- Old Snack
- Old Warhorse
- PVC Street Gang
- Pageantry
- Paper Robot
- Peopleodian
- Pinebox Serenade
- Pinkish Black
- Power Trip
- Prince Rama
- Quaker City Night Hawks
- RTB2
- Savage and the Big Beat
- Sealion
- Secret Cakes
- Shiny Around The Edges
- Skeleton Coast
- Seth Sherman
- So Far Sofari
- Somebody's Darling
- Sore Losers
- Space Camp Death Squad
- Spooky Folk
- Strange Towers
- TC
- TV Ghost
- Team Tomb
- Telegraph Canyon
- Terminator 2
- The Angelus
- The Atomic Tanlines
- The Blurries
- The Great Depressions
- The O's
- The Satans of Soft Rock
- The Treelines
- The Well
- Track Meet
- Ulnae
- Vaults of Zin
- Violent Squid
- Vulgar Fashion
- WAR PARTY
- Warren Jackson Hearne and Le Leek Electronique
- Western Skies
- Whiskey Folk Ramblers
- Yeahdef
- Zorch
Day Programming:

Friday

- Little d After Dark presents: "Beer and Tacos with The Pink Antler!"
- "In The Mix Denton: Music Industry Networking Reception"

Saturday

- "Internet Created the Video Star"
- "Will Play For Tips: 5 Legal Tips for Musicians/Artists/Songwriters"
- "A City, a College, and a Creative Class"

Sunday

- 35 Denton presents: "The Spiderweb Salon"

=== 2015 35 Denton, March 13–15 ===
Performing Artists:
- The Zombies
- Jimmie Dale Gilmore
- Ten Hands
- Jacco Gardner
- S U R V I V E
- Cymbals Eat Guitars
- Year of the Bear
- Chastity Belt
- Be Forest
- Lowell
- Cheerleader
- Icky Blossoms
- The Dry Season
- The Human Circuit
- Slobberbone
- Ded Kra-Z & Princess Eud
- Corners
- Monk Parker
- Empire Machines
- RC & The Gritz
- Happyness
- Daniel Romano
- The Memories
- Paige Bryan
- Boyfrndz
- Well Hung Heart
- Residual Kid
- Kim and The Created
- Capsula
- The Lonely Wild
- Born Cages
- Danny Malone
- Juan Wauters
- White Reaper
- Ruby the RabbitFoot
- Ayron Jones and The Way
- Low Cut Connie
- Emily & The Complexes
- Cobalt Cranes
- Choctaw Wildfire
- Gold Beach
- The Mike Dillon Band
- Conrad Clifton
- Monogold
- Mind Spiders
- La Guerre
- 35MM
- A.M.Ramblers
- Adrienne Tooley
- Allie Lauren
- American Werewolf Academy
- Ayron Jones
- Telegraph Canyon
- Bad Beats
- Bashe
- Beach Day
- Bee Caves
- Big Whyte
- Biographies
- Bird Meets Winter
- Black James Franco
- Blaire Alise & The Bombshells
- Blank-Men
- Blue Bear
- Bonafide Blues
- Boxcar Bandits
- Boy + Kite
- Brave Young Lion
- Brenna Manzare
- Brocka
- Brutal Juice
- Bukkake Moms
- Bummer Vacation
- Carson McHone
- Catamaran
- Champagne Shotgun
- Character.
- Chase Ryan & The Grave
- Chinaski, The Fury
- Circling Drones
- Claire Morales
- Cleanup
- Clint Niosi
- Conroy and The Cattlemen
- Cornhole
- County Rexford
- Cozy Hawks
- Curvette
- DEERPEOPLE
- DJ Super Will
- DJG
- DREAMERS
- Daniel Markham
- Danny Diamonds
- Dave Coulter
- Dave Willingham Project
- Dead Leaf Echo
- Dead Mockingbirds
- Def Rain
- Delmore Picrow
- Diamond Age
- Dim Locator
- Dome Dwellers
- Doug Burr
- Dove Hunter
- Eat Avery's Bones
- Eisentanz
- Endless Caverns
- Ethereal and The Queer Show
- Experimental Aircraft
- E’clat
- FUNDAMENTAL.
- Fab Deuce
- Felt & Fur
- Forever & Everest
- Fred Thomas
- Free Weed
- French 75
- Future Self
- GAR GAR
- GO DARK
- Genuine Leather
- Glitterature
- Goldenjoy
- Grace London
- Grave City
- Homeshake
- Hale Baskin
- Hares on the Mountain
- Helen Kelter Skelter
- Hollis Brown
- Hustle Roses
- International Sparkdome
- Isaac Hoskins
- It Hurts To Be Dead
- Jack Wilson
- Jamaican Queens
- Jason Weems
- Jay Killa
- Jazz Mills & Corey Baum
- Jeremy Buller
- Jessie Frye
- Josh Halverson
- Juicy the Emissary
- Kaela Sinclair
- Knifight
- Kody Jackson
- Kydd
- LAZY
- Larry Chin
- Layer Cake
- Leggy
- Leoncarlo
- Little Jack Melody
- Lonesome Doves
- Los de Esta Noche
- Maddy Ellwanger
- Madi Davis
- Madisons
- Marathons and Unicorns
- Marie Davidson
- Matthew Bell
- Matthew and the Arrogant Sea
- Meatbodies
- Merli & Spumante
- Michael Rault
- Mike Dillon & Carl Finch
- Milkdrive
- Mink Coats
- moth face
- Music Bear Tony Banks
- My Education
- Mydolls
- Mystery Lights
- Nervous Curtains
- Nite
- Old Potion
- Old Warhorse
- PHZ-Sicks
- PVC Street Gang
- Party Static
- Pearl Earl
- Pinebox Serenade
- Pleasant Grove
- Quaker City Nighthawks
- RTB2
- Radioactivity
- Rat Fist
- Richard Gilbert
- Robo Cougar
- Roger Sellers
- STARPARTY
- Scrote's Double Bari Sax Attack
- Sealion
- Shaprece
- She Banshee
- Singing Bowl Lady with Jeffrey Barnes
- Skagg Phillips
- Sky Window
- SkyAcre
- Sleeperhold
- Snow Wite and the Wormhole Revue
- Sol Kitchen
- Somebody's Darling
- Something Called Nothing
- Son of Stan
- Space State
- Special Mister Ed
- Stu Brootal
- Swandiver
- Tattoo Money
- Tex Smith
- The 432Hz Ensemble
- The Angelus
- The Birds of Night
- The Black Dotz
- The Casual Pleasures
- The Days
- The Deer
- The Demigs
- The Dirty Lungs
- The First Part
- The Holler Time
- The Hope Trust
- The Kickstand Band
- The Lonesome Band
- The Prettiots
- The Sal Show
- The Spectacle
- The Stockyard Playboys
- The Willy Collins Band
- Timothy Jarrod Smith & Hot Coffins
- Tony Garcia Gragnano
- Traan Raals
- Troller
- Two Cow Garage
- Tyne Darling
- Unmarked Graves
- Urizen
- Vinyl
- Violent Squid
- WAR PARTY
- Wax Witches
- We Are The Wilderness
- Whiskey Folk Ramblers
- Wildcat Apollo
- Wire Nest
- Wirewings
- Year of the Bear
- Zeifel
- Robert Gomez
- myopic
- tomkat
- voltRevolt
- Warren Jackson Hearne & Le Leek Electronique
Day Programming:

Saturday

- "Shamrock Social Run"
- "Cigar Box Guitar Workshop"
- "Spiderweb Salon"

Saturday [cont.]

- "Local Label Panel"
- "DIY Panel -or- Throw Your Own Damn Fest!"
- "Will Play For Tips: Legal Tips for Artists, Musicians, and Songwriters"

Sunday

- "Cherry Bombs: NTX's Queens of the Scene"

=== 2016 35 Denton, March 13–15 ===
Performing Artists:
- Charles Bradley and His Extraordinaires
- Biz Markie
- Eliot Sumner
- Electric Six
- Fat Tony
- Class Actress
- Tacocat
- White Reaper
- Sheer Mag
- Purple
- Vaadat Charigim
- Hunny
- Modern Vices
- The Garden
- AV The Great
- Parlour Tricks
- Son of Stan
- Mydolls
- Brothertiger
- What Moon Things
- Dixie Witch
- Mothers
- Chrome Pony
- Calliope Musicals
- Sudie
- Big Ups
- Washer
- AMFMS
- Dirty Dishes
- Well Hung Heart
- Megafauna
- Ronnie Heart
- Hikes
- Otis the Destroyer
- Acid Dad
- Pansy Moon
- My Education
- Jessie Frye
- *~~
- Abacaba
- Alesia Lani
- Alsace
- Animal Spirit
- Bad Beats
- Bashe
- Bereah
- Boat Drinks
- Breeze L
- Brothers In Law
- Cameron Matthew Ray
- Chris Welch
- Claire Morales
- Convoy & The Cattlemen
- Cornhole
- Cozy Hawks
- Crescendo
- Crown Larks
- Daniel Markham
- Danny Diamonds
- Dead Leaf Echo
- Decora
- Dim Locator
- Dome Dwellers
- Dove Hunter
- Doug Funnie
- Felt & Fur
- Fee Lion
- Friday Mean
- FUNDAMENTAL.
- Future Self
- Gar Gar
- Goldenjoy
- Gum
- Hares on the Mountain
- Helen Kelter Skelter
- Hella Zealous
- Holly Macve
- In Memory of Man
- Jas Patrick
- J. Finn
- J K P K
- Jonas Martin
- Joy Again
- Kalo
- Keytari
- Killmama
- Kim Nall & The Fringe
- Kinetica
- Kody Jackson
- Küken
- Larry Chin
- Legacy
- Leoncarlo
- LEV
- Love & The Zealous
- Löwin
- Loyal Sally
- Manantial de Fuego
- Marathons and Unicorns
- Maximiliano Calvo
- Melissa Ratley
- Mtn. Air
- Mountain of Smoke
- Mountain Song
- Music Bear Tony Banks
- My Gold Mask
- Nazeem & Spencer Joles
- Nervous Curtains
- Nightmare Air
- Nite
- North By North
- Northern National
- Pansy Moon
- Paul Slavens
- Pearl Earl
- Prism Cloud
- Rat Rios
- Reagan James
- Relick
- Repel The Robot
- Richard Gilbert
- Rodger Delaney
- RTB2
- Scott Danbom
- Seres
- Shaolin Death Squad
- Shivering Timbers
- Shmu
- Siamese
- Skagg Phillips
- Stef Chura
- Supersonic Lips
- Swandiver
- Teen Slut
- Tesha
- The Angelus
- The Birds of Night
- The Brevet
- The Daniel Green Show
- The Demigs
- The Foreign Resort
- The Green Hour Residency
- The Heavy Hands
- The Madisons
- The Raven Charter
- The Single Issues
- The Van Allen Belt
- The Wee Beasties
- Thin Skin
- Timothy Jarrod Smith & Hot Coffins
- Tomkat
- Ultra Violent Rays
- Vanessa Peters
- V V O E S
- Vodeo
- Warren Jackson Hearne
- Wild Bill
- Wildcat Apollo
- Will Johnson
- William Austin Clay
- Wirewings
- Wiving
Day Programming:

Saturday

- "Level Up Your Booking"
- "Recording in The Age of Everything"
- "Lawyers Are Your Friends"

Sunday

- "Drone Church" at Sprocket's Bike Shop
- "Spiderweb Salon"

== See also ==
- Thin Line Fest
- Denton Arts and Jazz Festival
- Denton, Texas
