= Austin City Limits Music Festival =

Annual music festival held in Austin, Texas

Coordinates: 30°16′3.216″N 97°46′1.78″W

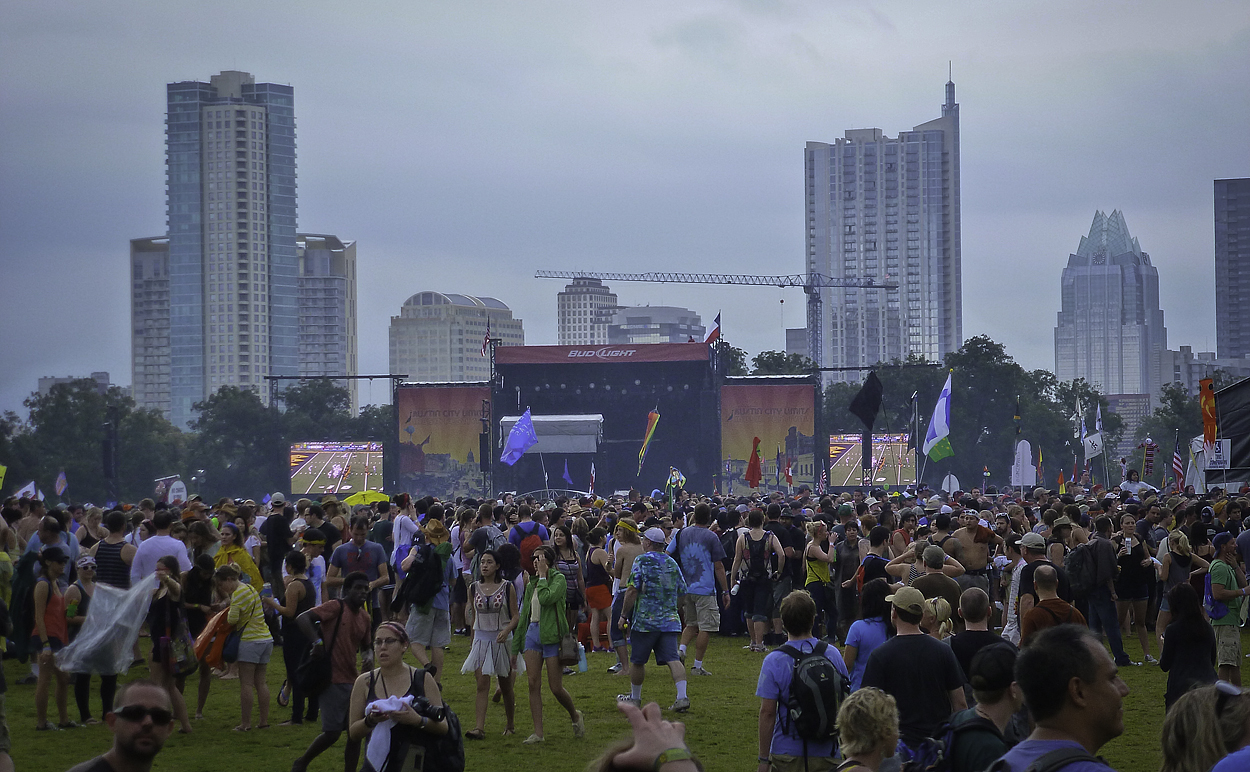
- ACL Music Festival’s Bud Light stage, 2012
- Genre: Music festival
- Frequency: Annually
- Locations: Zilker Park, Austin, Texas, United States
- Years active: 2002–present
- Most recent: October 2–4 / 9–11, 2026
- Previous event: October 3–5 / 10–12, 2025
- Attendance: 450,000 over six days (2025)
- Capacity: 75,000 per day
- Website: aclfestival.com

Austin City Limits (ACL) Music Festival is an annual music festival that takes place in Zilker Park in Austin, Texas, on two consecutive three-day weekends and is inspired by the KLRU/PBS music series Austin City Limits. The festival is produced by Austin-based company C3 Presents, which also produces Chicago’s Lollapalooza.

The ACL Music Festival has eight stages where musical groups from genres including rock, indie, country, folk, electronic, and hip hop perform. The concert starts at 11am and ends 10pm on each day during the festival at various stages spread out in the park. In 2025, the festival drew 75,000 attendees per day for six days, for a total attendance of 450,000. In addition to the music performances, there are food and drinks, an art market, a kids area for families and other activities for attendees.

== History ==
Founded in 2002, the festival began as a one-weekend event and remained as such until 2012. On August 16, 2012, Austin City Council members voted unanimously to allow the Austin City Limits Music Festival to expand to two consecutive weekends beginning in 2013. Artists who have played at the festival include Metallica, Red Hot Chili Peppers, The Weeknd, Depeche Mode, The Cure, Arctic Monkeys, Guns N' Roses, Tame Impala, Robyn, Arcade Fire, Muse, The Strokes, Vampire Weekend, The Flaming Lips, Radiohead, Nick Cave and the Bad Seeds, Pearl Jam, Foo Fighters, Paul McCartney, Oasis, Austin native Gary Clark Jr., Willie Nelson, Kendrick Lamar, and more.

In July 2020, the festival was called off due to the COVID-19 crisis.

In May 2022, it was announced that Hulu will exclusively stream the festival, as well as Bonnaroo Music Festival and Lollapalooza.

== Economic impact ==
A study by Angelou Economics, prepared on behalf of C3 Presents and released in May 2025, estimated that the 2024 festival generated $534.8 million in economic activity for Austin and supported approximately 3,607 jobs. The same study put the festival's cumulative economic impact since 2006, when C3 Presents began tracking the figures, at more than $4.1 billion. The study also reported that the festival contributed $8.4 million to the Austin Parks Foundation in 2024, bringing its cumulative parks-related contributions since 2006 to nearly $71 million.

== Vendors ==
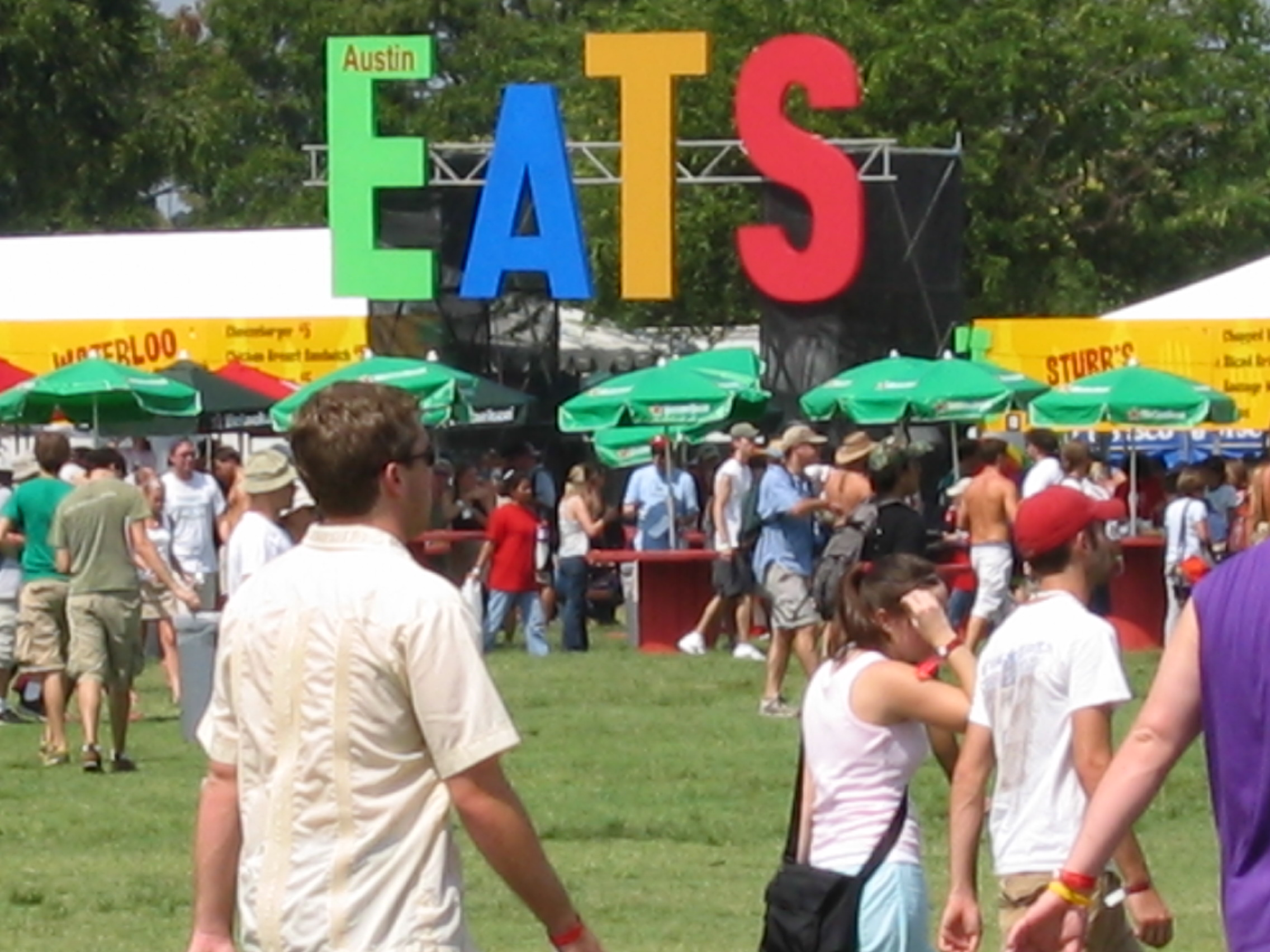
The Austin Eats food court in 2004.

The Festival's food court, called Austin Eats, is modeled after the Jazz Fest in New Orleans. Austin Eats features vendors from local Austin restaurants.

The Festival’s art market features numerous art vendors located in the centre of Zilker Park and is open throughout the duration of the festival.

== International expansion ==
=== Auckland City Limits ===
In 2015, it was announced that the Auckland City Limits Music Festival would debut at Western Springs stadium in Auckland, New Zealand in early October 2016. The festival showcased over 40 artists from a broad spectrum of musical genres, and highlight local culinary, artisans, festival fashion, an area for children, and a new festival forum for speaking on and exchanging cultural and innovative ideas.

=== Sydney City Limits ===
In the spring of 2018 Sydney City Limits made its debut at Brazilian Fields and Parade Grounds at Centennial Park in Sydney, Australia. This festival was one day and featured 28 bands on four stages. It had many of the same activities and features as Austin City Limits such as Sydney Eats, Sydney Market, and Sydney Kiddie Limits.

== Releases ==
Several live albums of music from the festival were released. The 2004 festival as CD and double DVD albums Austin City Limits Music Festival: Live From Austin, Texas 2004 and 2005 festival as double CD album Austin City Limits 2005 Music Festival.

== See also ==
- 35 Denton
- South by Southwest
