= My Education =

My Education may refer to

- My Education: A Book of Dreams, a 1995 novel by William S. Burroughs
- My Education (novel), a 2013 novel by Susan Choi
- My Education (band), an American instrumental post-rock band
