= This Is Our Science =

Studio album by Astronautalis
- Released: September 13, 2011
- Genre: Hip-hop
- Length: 38:10
- Label: Fake Four Inc.
- Producers: Picnic Tyme; Ted Gowans; Lazerbeak; Rickolus; Alias; Broken; Astronautalis; Radical Face; Cecil Otter; John Congleton

Astronautalis chronology
Pomegranate (2008)	This Is Our Science (2011)	Cut the Body Loose (2016)

This Is Our Science is the fourth solo studio album by American hip-hop artist Astronautalis. It was released via Fake Four Inc. on September 13, 2011. It peaked at number 44 on the Billboard Heatseekers Albums chart. Music videos were created for "Contrails", "This Is Our Science", and "Dimitri Mendeleev".

== Critical reception ==
Professional ratings
Aggregate scores
Source	Rating
Metacritic	85/100
Review scores
Source	Rating
Alternative Press	4/5 stars
Consequence of Sound	A+
Okayplayer	82/100
PopMatters	8/10 stars

At Metacritic, which assigns a weighted average score out of 100 to reviews from mainstream critics, the album received an average score of 85, based on 7 reviews, indicating "universal acclaim".

Joe Marvilli of Consequence of Sound gave the album a grade of A+, saying: "With all the lines, lyrics, and love he put into This Is Our Science, he'll find a home in every city he visits on the road and a growing fan base of friends with whom he can share his stories."

City Pages included the album on the "Minnesota's Best Albums of 2011" list.

== Track listing ==
No.	Title	Producer(s)	Length
1.	"The River, the Woods"	Picnic Tyme	3:19
2.	"This Is Our Science"	Ted Gowan	3:46
3.	"Thomas Jefferson" (featuring Sims and Mike Wiebe)	Lazerbeak	3:31
4.	"Measure the Globe"	Rickolus	2:59
5.	"Dimitri Mendeleev"	Alias	3:37
6.	"Midday Moon"	Picnic Tyme	4:56
7.	"Contrails" (featuring Tegan Quin)	Broken	2:58
8.	"Holy Water"	Astronautalis	2:57
9.	"Secrets on Our Lips"	Radical Face	4:40
10.	"Lift the Curse"	Cecil Otter	4:51
11.	"One for the Money"	John Congleton	0:10

== Personnel ==
Credits adapted from liner notes.

- Astronautalis – vocals, production (8)
- Sean Kirkpatrick – synthesizer (1, 2, 5), piano (5)
- McKenzie Smith – drums (1, 2, 5, 7, 9)
- Mike Weibe – vocals (1, 3)
- Picnic Tyme – production (1, 6)
- John Congleton – bass guitar (1, 7), guitar (1, 7, 9), production (11), recording, mixing
- Daniel Hart – strings (1, 7, 9)
- Chad Stockslager – piano (1, 9), vocals (2, 9)
- Isaiah Toothtaker – vocals (2)
- P.O.S – vocals (2)
- Ted Gowan – production (2)
- Sims – vocals (3)
- Lazerbeak – production (3)
- Rickolus – production (4)
- Alias – production (5)
- Tegan Quin – vocals (7)
- Broken – production (7)
- Radical Face – production (9)
- Cecil Otter – production (10)
- Alan Douches – mastering

== Charts ==
Chart	Peak position
US Heatseekers Albums (Billboard)	44
