= Suburban Nature =

Studio album by Sarah Jaffe
- Released: April 6, 2010
- Recorded: December 2009 at The Track Studio
- Genre: Indie rock
- Length: 46:05
- Label: Kirtland Records
- Producer: John Congleton

Sarah Jaffe chronology
Even Born Again (2008)	Suburban Nature (2010)	The Way Sound Leaves a Room (2011)

Suburban Nature is the second studio album by American singer-songwriter Sarah Jaffe. It was recorded by producer John Congleton of The Paper Chase who is known for recording such artists as Explosions in the Sky, Mount Righteous, Kirk Franklin, and The Polyphonic Spree at Elmwood Studio in Dallas, Texas.

Musicians Kris Youmans and Robert Gomez appeared on the album.

== Track listing ==
1. "Before You Go"
2. "Stay With Me"
3. "Clementine"
4. "Better Than Nothing"
5. "Vulnerable"
6. "Wreaking Havoc"
7. "Summer Begs"
8. "Pretender Pt. 1"
9. "Pretender"
10. "Luv"
11. "Swelling"
12. "Watch Me Fall Apart"
13. "Perfect Plan"
14. "Nurture It" (iTunes bonus track)
