= Even Born Again =

EP by Sarah Jaffe
- Released: August 20, 2008
- Genre: Indie
- Label: Summer Break Records
- Producer: John Congleton

Sarah Jaffe chronology
Even Born Again (2008)	Suburban Nature (2010)

Even Born Again is a six-song EP by Denton singer-songwriter Sarah Jaffe. The EP was produced and recorded by John Congleton at Elmwood Studios in Dallas, Texas. Even Born Again features Dallas musicians Jonathan Clark, Becki Phares Howard, Ben Moore, Jeff Ryan, and Kris Youmans. The album was released on August 20, 2008 by Summer Break Records.

== Track listing ==
1. Even Born Again
2. Black Hoax Lie
3. Adeline
4. Under
5. Two Intangibles Can't Be Had
6. Backwards/ Forwards
