= Jackleg Devotional to the Heart =

Studio album by The Baptist Generals
- Released: May 21, 2013
- Genre: folk, indie rock
- Length: 44:10
- Label: Sub Pop

The Baptist Generals chronology
No Silver/No Gold (2003)	Jackleg Devotional to the Heart (2013)

Jackleg Devotional to the Heart is the second full-length album released on May 21, 2013, by the Denton, Texas based band The Baptist Generals, and their third release on US label Sub Pop.

== Track listing ==
All songs written by Chris "Cee" Flemmons.

No.	Title	Length
1.	"Machine En Prolepsis"	2:26
2.	"Dog That Bit You"	3:44
3.	"Clitorpus Christi"	3:27
4.	"Turnunders and Overpasses"	4:24
5.	"Oblivion"	3:38
6.	"3 Bromides"	3:32
7.	"Broken Glass"	3:31
8.	"Snow on the FM"	2:43
9.	"Floating"	3:57
10.	"My O My"	5:24
11.	"Morning of My Life"	3:04
12.	"Oblivion Overture"	4:20
