= Pomegranate (Astronautalis album) =

Studio album by Astronautalis
- Released: September 23, 2008
- Genre: Hip-hop
- Length: 39:55
- Label: Eyeball Records
- Producer: John Congleton

Astronautalis chronology
The Mighty Ocean & Nine Dark Theaters (2006)	Pomegranate (2008)	This Is Our Science (2011)

Pomegranate is the third solo studio album by American hip-hop artist Astronautalis. It was released via Eyeball Records on September 23, 2008. Music videos were created for "Trouble Hunters" and "The Wondersmith and His Sons".

== Critical reception ==
Professional ratings
Review scores
Source	Rating
AbsolutePunk	94%
Consequence of Sound	A+
Alternative Press	3/5
PopMatters	5/10 stars
The Stranger	3.5/5 stars

Cap Blackard of Consequence of Sound gave the album a grade of A+, saying, "Pomegranate is intricately constructed and diverse in its musical and lyrical make-up." Meanwhile, Jer Fairall of PopMatters gave the album 5 out of 10 stars, calling it "a portrait of a clearly talented artist who has not yet learned how to temper his innovation with the necessary discipline."

"The Story of My Life" was NPR Music's "Song of the Day" on September 23, 2008.

In 2009, Consequence of Sound placed the album at number 71 on the "Top of the Decade: The Albums" list.

== Track listing ==
All tracks are written by Andy Bothwell, except "17 Summers" written by Bothwell and Sarah Jaffe and "The Story of My Life" written by Bothwell and P.O.S.

No.	Title	Length
1.	"The Wondersmith and His Sons"	3:35
2.	"17 Summers"	2:50
3.	"Secrets of the Undersea Bell"	2:24
4.	"My Old Man's Badge"	2:24
5.	"Two Years Before the Mast"	4:20
6.	"Mr. Blessington's Imperialist Plot"	2:52
7.	"An Episode of Sparrows"	3:11
8.	"The Case of William Smith"	4:16
9.	"Trouble Hunters"	3:36
10.	"Avalanche Patrol"	4:06
11.	"The Most Important Track on the Album"	2:45
12.	"The Story of My Life"	3:36
Total length:		39:55

== Personnel ==
Credits adapted from liner notes.

- Astronautalis – vocals, additional instrumentation
- John Congleton – additional instrumentation, production, programming, engineering, recording, mixing
- Sean Kirkpatrick – piano, synthesizer
- Kris Youmans – cello
- Tamara Cauble – violin
- Audrey Easley – flute, piccolo, electronic wind instrument
- Jay Jennings – trumpet
- Mckenzie Smith – drums
- Sarah Jaffe – vocals (2)
- Chris Godbey – additional programming (6, 8)
- P.O.S – vocals (12)
- Alan Douches – mastering
- Luther Himes – artwork, layout
