= The Body Wins =

Studio album by Sarah Jaffe
- Released: April 2012
- Recorded: The Track Studio
- Genre: Indie rock
- Label: Kirtland Records
- Producer: John Congleton

Sarah Jaffe chronology
Suburban Nature (2010)	The Body Wins (2012)

The Body Wins is the second full-length studio album by Denton, Texas artist Sarah Jaffe. It was recorded by producer John Congleton of The Paper Chase at Elmwood Studio in Dallas, Texas.

Drummer McKenzie Smith, keyboardist Scott Danbom, guitarist Robert Gomez violinist Daniel Hart and Becki Howard perform on the album.

Many of the tracks on this album are slow-paced songs about love and heartbreak.

== Track listing ==
1. "Paul Listen"
2. "The Body Wins"
3. "Glorified High"
4. "Mannequin Woman"
5. "Halfway Right"
6. "The Way Sound Leaves A Room"
7. "Fangs"
8. "Hooray For Love"
9. "Foggy Field"
10. "Sucker For Your Marketing"
11. "Limerence"
12. "Talk"
13. "When You Rest"
