= Zhora =

Zhora (Armenian: Ժորա, Russian: Жора) is a Slavic masculine given name, a short version of Yegor, Georg or Georgy. It is also used as a full masculine given name in Armenia.

Notable people with the given name include:

== Given name ==
- Zhora Akopyan
- Zhora Harutyunyan (1928–2002), Armenian writer and playwright
- Zhora Hovhannisyan (born 1987), Armenian footballer
- Zhora Kryzhovnikov, Russian film director, screenwriter and producer

== Surname ==
- Victor Zhora, Ukrainian cybersecurity expert

== See also ==
- List of Blade Runner characters#Zhora_Salome
