= Robert Gomez =

American musician (born 1975)

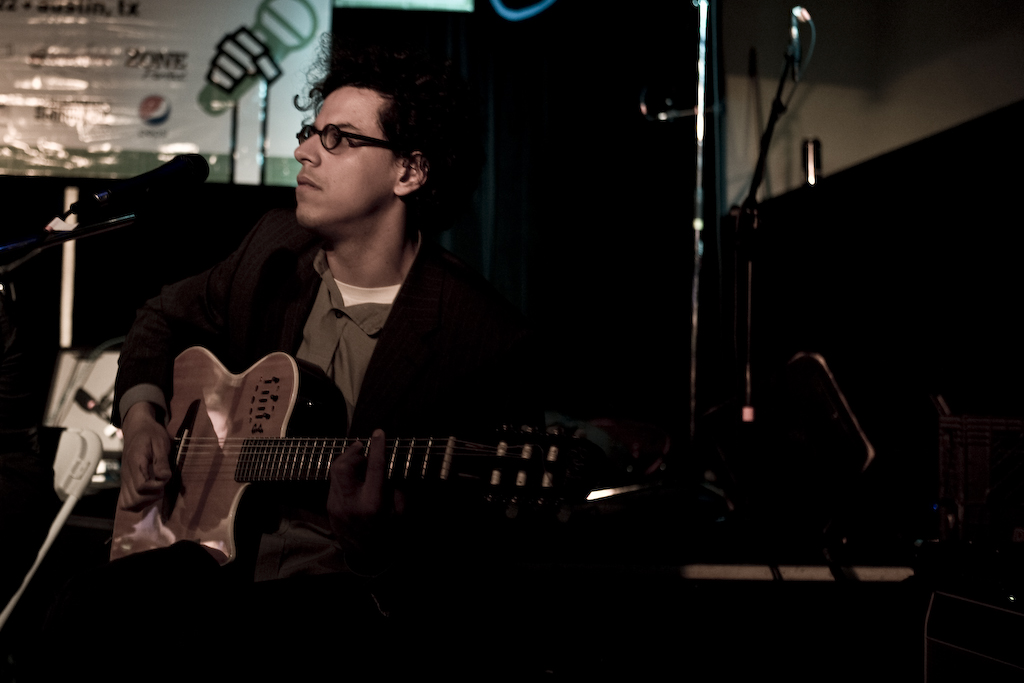
- Image of Robert Gomez

Background information
- Born: November 17, 1975 (age 50)
- Origin: Corpus Christi, Texas U.S.
- Genres: Indie rock, folk
- Occupations: Singer-songwriter, multi-instrumentalist
- Instruments: Vocals, guitar, bass, accordion, keyboards, drums
- Years active: 2005–present
- Labels: Bella Union, Nova Posta Vinyl
- Website: TheRobertGomez.com

Robert Gomez (born November 11, 1975) is a musician from Denton, Texas.

== Career ==
After his first self-released album in 2005, Etherville, he was then signed to the British Label Bella Union and released the album Brand New Towns in 2007. Brand New Towns was relatively well received in the British press, such as The Guardian, The Sunday Times, and The Independent. Andy Gill of The Independent gave the album 5 out of 5 stars calling it "the first truly great album of the year". NPR Music featured Gomez in an in-studio performance on "World Cafe" with David Dye in 2007.

In a Nylon Magazine article in which they "polled experts across the U.S. to unearth the best unexpected local music scenes", Gomez was listed along with Midlake, St. Vincent, and the Baptist Generals as being noteworthy. Gomez' third record, "Pine Sticks and Phosphorus", was released in 2009 on the Denton-based label Nova Posta Vinyl. Currently, he is recording an album entitled Severance Songs based on the book Severance by Pulitzer Prize winner author Robert Olen Butler.

In addition to performing as a solo artist, Gomez also performs with artists such as Sarah Jaffe, John Grant, and Anna Lynne Williams.
