= Denton Arts and Jazz Festival =

Denton Arts & Jazz Festival
- Genre: Arts, Jazz, multiple
- Dates: September 11-13, 2026
- Location: Denton, Texas
- Coordinates: 33°12′59″N 97°7′45″W
- Years active: 1981–2019, 2021–
- Founders: Carol Short
- Attendance: 200,000
- Website: dentonjazzfest.com

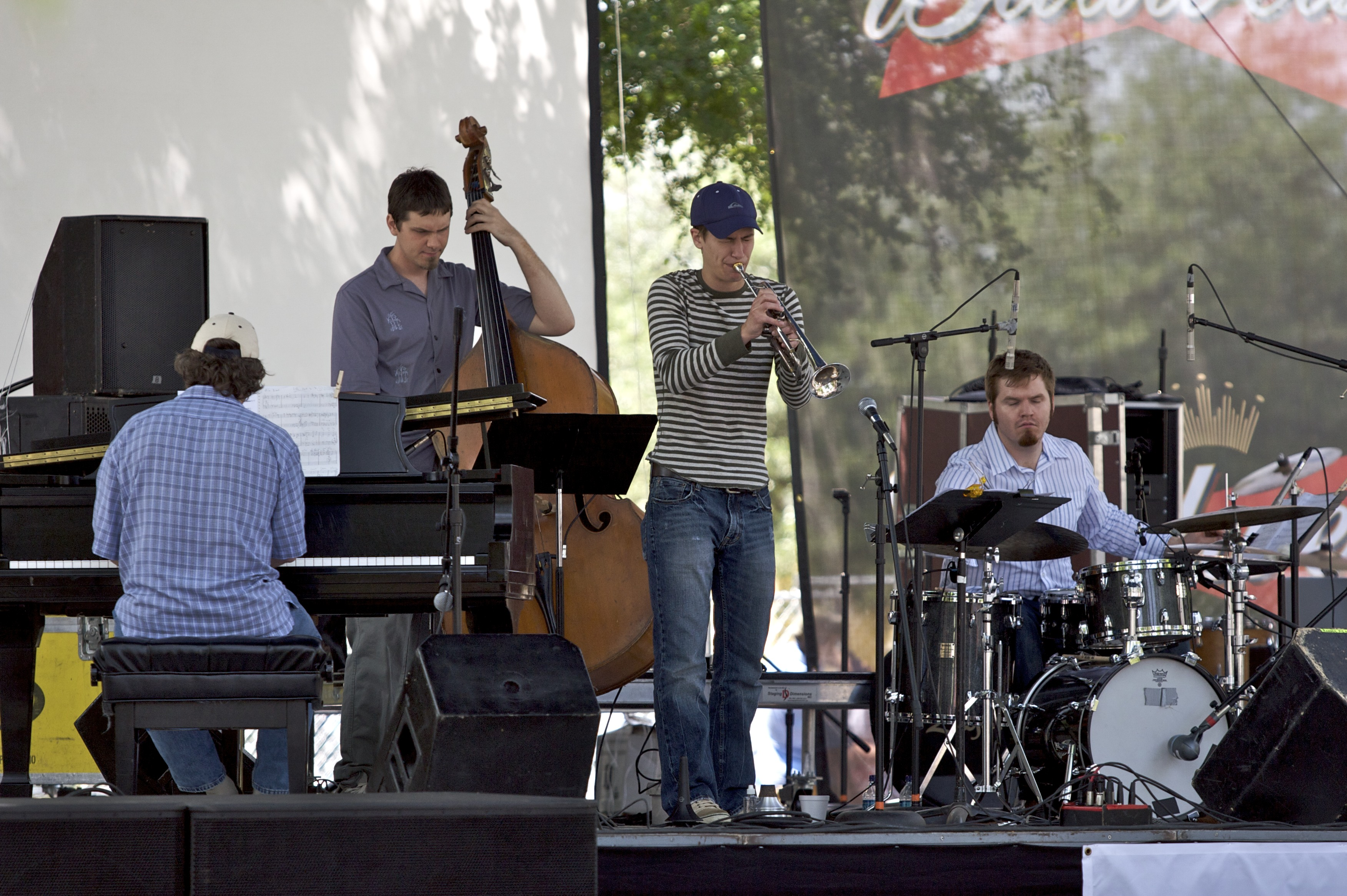

The Denton Arts & Jazz Festival is a free 2½-day event held the first weekend of October in the city of Denton, Texas, and was established in 1980 by Carol Short, a Denton resident and promoter of the arts in Texas. Originally held the last weekend of April at the North Texas State Fairgrounds as the “Spring Fling”, the annual event was moved to the Center for the Visual Arts in 1989. In 1990, Spring Fling merged with JazzFest to create the Denton Arts and Jazz Festival, and moved to Quakertown Park (formerly Civic Center Park), a natural space in the heart of the city near the town square. The Denton Festival Foundation, Inc. produces the event with the support of sponsors including the City of Denton, the City of Denton Parks and Recreation Department, the Dallas/Fort Worth American Federation of Musicians Local 72-147, and other corporate and individual sponsors, ensuring the event remains free to the public. The festival attracts over 200,000 people each year. The festival includes seven stages, 2,300 artists and 250+ arts and crafts booths. Musicians including Ravi Coltrane, Jack DeJohnette, and Aaron Neville ) have headlined the festival on the main stage. The Showcase Stage draws large crowds, with big bands, vocal ensembles, and student jazz groups from the University of North Texas College of Music including the One’O Clock Jazz Band. In 2020 the COVID-19 pandemic prompted officials to move the festival to October, where it continues every year. Founder Carol Short resigned in 2021 as the executive director. The Spring Fling, Center for the Visual Arts, Denton Festival Foundation and Denton Arts & Jazz Festival are historical legacies, along with the University of North Texas music and art programs, that showcase the talent of Denton, Texas.

== See also ==
- Thin Line Fest
- 35 Denton
