= Bosque Brown =

American indie band

- Origin: Denton, Texas, US
- Genres: Alternative country
- Years active: Since 2005
- Labels: Burnt Toast Vinyl Fargo Records (Europe)
- Members: Mara Lee Miller; Jeremy Buller
- Website: http://www.bosquebrown.com/

Bosque Brown is an American indie band from the music town of Denton, Texas.

While attending college there, singer-songwriter Mara Lee Miller chose "Bosque Brown" for her music, named after a river that runs through Stephenville, Texas, her childhood home. She recorded a handful of demos and had her husband hand them over to songwriter Damien Jurado after a show. He contacted her again and helped her to secure a recording opportunity in Seattle, Washington.

The resulting EP is 2005's Bosque Brown Plays Mara Lee Miller, a recording that includes various contributions by Jurado, producer Eric Fisher, with mastering duties by Pedro the Lion's David Bazan and T.W. Walsh. The first effort from Miller and company has been lauded for its vulnerability and darkness.

The band's follow up album, Baby, was released in March 2009.

== Discography ==
- Bosque Brown Plays Mara Lee Miller (2005, Burnt Toast Vinyl, btv064)
- Cerro Verde (one-sided 12") (2006, Burnt Toast Vinyl, btv073)
- Baby (March 2009, Burnt Toast Vinyl, btv084)
- Us (June 2015, Bandcamp, digital release)

== Notes ==
- Musique: Bosque Brown - Baby (archive)
- "Bosque Brown – "Baby" sur Culturopoing". Culturopoing.com. November 15, 2009. Archived from the original on January 21, 2010.
