= Jamaican Queens =

American electronic pop band

- Origin: Detroit, Michigan, U.S.
- Genres: Pop, electronic, experimental, Indie rock
- Years active: 2012–present
- Members: Ryan Spencer; Adam Pressley; Ryan Clancy

Jamaican Queens is an American electronic pop band based in Detroit, Michigan.

== History ==
Adam Pressley and Ryan Spencer formed Jamaican Queens in Detroit in 2011. Pressley and Spencer had previously performed together in the defunct band Prussia. The duo wrote the songs that would comprise their first album. Jamaican Queens later expanded to include drummer Ryan Clancy. The band name comes from Spencer's love of Jamaican dancehall music.

In March 2013, Jamaican Queens released their debut album, Wormfood. Abby Fiscus provided vocals on two tracks, and also appeared on the album's cover. L Magazine ranked Wormfood #3 on its list of the 20 Best Albums of 2013, calling it the year's "best debut record." The band's music has been described as having elements of pop, glam rock and electronic dance music. Some of their influences include David Bowie, the Magnetic Fields, and Three Six Mafia. Spencer has called Morrissey his biggest influence when writing lyrics.

In October 2014, the band released a new single, "Bored + Lazy". On June 2, 2015, the band's second album, Downers, was released.

== Discography ==
=== Albums ===
Title	Album details
Wormfood	Released: March 5, 2013; Label: self-released; Formats: Digital download, CD, vinyl, cassette
Downers	Released: June 2, 2015; Label: Freakish Pleasures; Formats: Digital download, vinyl, cassette (limited edition)

=== EPs ===
Title	Album details
Bored + Lazy	Released: February 6, 2015; Label: Freakish Pleasures; Formats: Digital download, 12" white label vinyl

=== Singles ===
Year	Title	Album
2012	"When You Sleep": Released: September 11, 2012; Formats: Digital download	
2013	"Kids Get Away": Released: June 17, 2013; Formats: Digital download	Wormfood
2014	"Bored + Lazy": Released: November 4, 2014; Formats: Digital download, vinyl	Downers
