= Mydolls =

American rock band

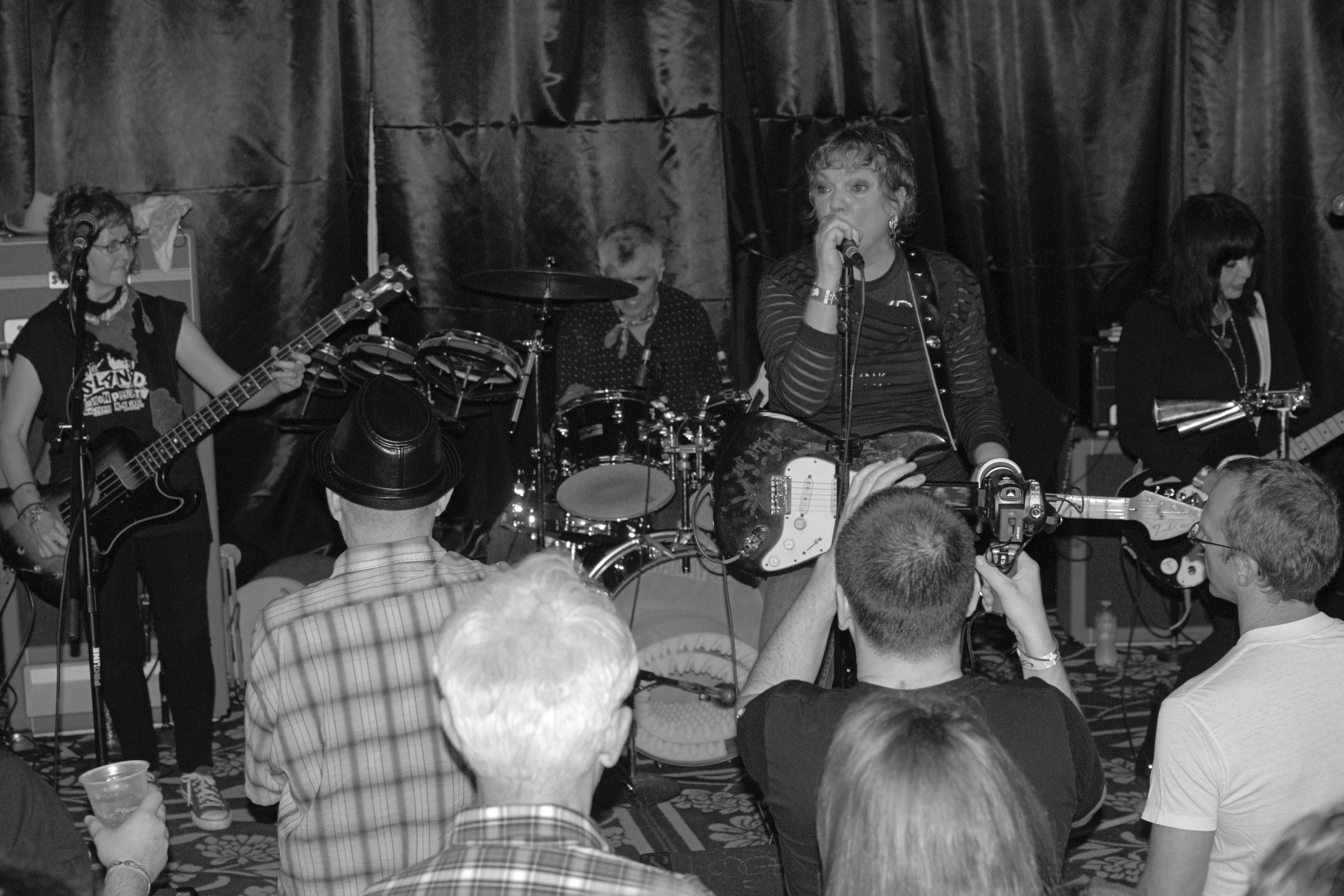
- Mydolls performing at Walter's in Houston, November 2012

Background information
- Origin: Houston, Texas, U.S.
- Genres: Punk rock; post-punk
- Years active: 1978–1986; 2008–present
- Labels: CIA; Sub Pop; Grand Theft Audio; Betsey
- Members: Trish Herrera; Dianna Ray; George Reyes; Linda Younger
- Website: www.mydollsmusic.com

Mydolls is an American rock band from Houston, Texas, formed in 1978. The group consists of Linda Younger (guitar and vocals), Dianna Ray (bass and vocals), Trish Herrera (guitar and vocals), and George Reyes (drums and vocals).

== History ==
=== Formation ===
Mydolls formed in 1978 in Houston, Texas. Dianna Ray and Trish Herrera began writing songs together. Dianna and Trish were then joined by Linda (Bond) Younger. After several attempts working with various auditioning drummers, Trish's cousin, George (Jorge) Reyes, joined the band, and the post-punk sound took shape as the band remained inspired by punk ranging from the 1960s and 1970s, including Iggy Pop, Magazine, Television, Red Crayola, the Velvet Underground, Patti Smith, New York Dolls, and other disruptive bands. Trish and Linda tended to play their guitars in a very unconventional way. Linda would sometimes play the top three strings, while Trish played the bottom three, making the sound textured. Meanwhile, Jorge Reyes percussive style de-emphasized a hi-hat based rock'n'roll meter in favor of a syncopated, Latin-flavored approach that concentrated on rhythmic tom tom usage rather than basic back-beats. The vocals, were mainly shared by Trish and Linda, with Dianna adding chanting and George singing back-up vocals on a few songs while playing drums. Since the band pre-dated punk as a strict genre, the band wasn't aware of making "mistakes", since no musical box constricted them. Only later, they felt, did punk begin to form uniforms and formulas.

=== Early years ===
Mydolls traveled to London after the release of their first 45, In Technicolor (CIA, 1980) and were greeted by Mayo Thompson of the Red Crayola and workers at Rough Trade Records. While in London Mydolls went to BBC Radio to meet John Peel and were invited to do an on-air interview with him. In 1984, Mydolls traveled to New York City to attend the U.S. premiere of Wim Wenders' film Paris, Texas at the New York Film Festival and played the after-party at the Danceteria. Mydolls appear in the film performing their song "A World of Her Own" in the bar scene, shot in Port Arthur, Texas, with Nastassja Kinski and Harry Dean Stanton, whom Herrera met personally in Telluride, Colorado. Locally, Mydolls played in Houston at dance studios, outsider art environments such as Studio One, Farrell Dyde Dance Studio, art galleries, and the Museum of Fine Arts. They also played at more traditional music venues such as the Ale-house, Caribana, Rock Island, Numbers, Omni, Cabaret Voltaire, Rudyards, and Rockefellers. They found themselves sharing the bill with local luminaries Really Red, The Hates, Wild Bores, Culturcide, Introverts, Plastic idols, Recipients, Party Owls, Degenerates, Anarchitex, and Naked Amerika as well as traveling acts such as Minor Threat, Poison 13, Big Boys, Ragged Bags, the Cramps, Siouxsie and the Banshees, and Stickmen with Rayguns. In 1985, Mydolls played a farewell gig at the Orange Show.

=== Tours ===
Mydolls' tours took them to college towns and small alternative venues. In 1983, they completed a Midwest tour dubbed "The Dead Armadillo Tour" which included shows in Ohio, Illinois, Oklahoma, Kentucky, Missouri, and Michigan and a 1984 Midwest/East Coast jaunt, dubbed the "Go to Fish Tour," stopping in New York, Maryland, Pennsylvania, Ohio, Tennessee and Kentucky.

Mydolls' devoted sound engineer, Phil Davis, lovingly referred to as "Feedback Phil", was the original sound man for Paradise Island / Rock Island, a seminal first wave punk club in Houston. Phil traveled with Mydolls in order to ensure high-quality mixes at clubs. Selections from the board mixes recorded in Newport, Kentucky, at the Jockey Club and at JB's in Kent, Ohio, were included on the 12" EP Speak Softly and Carry A Big Stick.

=== Reformation ===
Kathy Johnston, Dianna Ray's wife, played guitar with Mydolls at their farewell show in 1985. She later collaborated with Dianna and Trish in the bands World War I (Women with Instruments), Black Dresses and They Should Have Been Blondes. Johnston continued to play live with Mydolls after their reformation in 2008. She died in 2011 of MDS, a rare blood cancer.

In 2007, A World of Her Own, the Mydolls' complete anthology CD, was released by Grand Theft Audio. The set includes 2 CDs and a 24-page booklet of song lyrics, photos, flyers, and liner notes. In November 2008 Mydolls reformed to play at the "Noise and Smoke Festival" in Houston, Texas.

=== 2011–present ===
In January 2011, Mydolls were featured in the book Visual Vitriol: The Street Art and Subcultures of the Punk and Hardcore Generations (Univ. Press of Mississippi). They are featured in an extensive interview in the January 2013 issue of the long-time punk fanzine Maximumrocknroll.

November 2012 saw them play at the successful Island Reunion show celebrating the birthplace of punk rock in Houston.

In August 2013, Mydolls were selected as one of only ten Houston artists to be inaugural inductees into the newly established Houston Music Hall of Fame along with Geto Boys, Gene Watson and ZZ Top

In October 2013, Mydolls played at MEOW CON in Austin, along with featured guest Suzi Quatro.

In Summer 2014, Mydolls played at Numbers Night Club in Houston, for the infamous street skate punk group, the Urban Animals reunion party.

In the Spring of 2015, Mydolls played the North Texas music festival Denton 35 along with the English rock band the Zombies.

In the Fall of 2015, Mydolls released a new eight song CD It's Too Hot for Revolution. Later in the same year, Mydolls traveled to California and played at the "Fabulosa Festival" in Yosemite, then traveled to Oakland, California, to open for The Avengers at Leo's Club.

Mydolls continues to play national and statewide shows on a regular basis.

Since its inception in 2010, Trish Herrera and Dianna Ray have also played in the post-punk band, No Love Less, with drummer David Ensminger.

== Band members ==
- Trish Herrera – vocals and guitar, 1978–present
- Linda Younger – guitar and vocals, 1978–present
- Dianna Ray – bass and vocals, 1978–present
- George Reyes – drums, 1978–present

== Discography ==
=== Singles and EPs ===
- "Nova Grows Up" / "Therapist", CIA Records 45 rpm 7"
- "Exorcist" / "Imposter", CIA Records 45 rpm 7"
- Speak Softly and Carry a Big Stick, CIA Records 45 rpm 12"

=== Albums ===
- A World of Her Own, Grand Theft Audio, CD, 2007
- It's Too Hot for Revolution, Betsey, 8 song CD, also available as a digital download, 2015

=== Compilations ===
- "Soldiers of Pure War" appears on Cottage Cheese From the Lips of Death compilation, Ward-9, 1983
- "Savage Song" appears on Sub Pop 7 compilation cassette, Sub Pop, 1983
- "Savage Song" also appears on The Dog That Wouldn't Die compilation cassette, CIA Records, 1986
