= The Botticellis =

2000s American indie surf pop band

- Genres: Indie pop, surf rock, folk
- Years active: 2004–2010
- Website: www.thebotticellis.com

The Botticellis were an American surf pop band founded in 2003 in Santa Cruz by Alexi Glickman, Zack Ehrlich, Burton Li, and Dave Tranchina. Their 2008 debut record was released by Antenna Farm Records in 2008 to critical acclaim. NPR, Dusted Magazine, Allmusic, Pitchfork Media Daytrotter Crawdaddy!.

"Botticelli" is Italian for "little barrel." The Botticellis' sound has been described as "chamber pop" and likened to the California surf music of the 1960s as well as post-Beatles pop groups like Big Star, Chris Bell, Raspberries, ELO, George Harrison, Belle & Sebastian, Paul Simon and similar artists who are known to bring sophistication to pop composition.

The band dissolved in 2010, with its members pursuing separate musical projects.

== Band members ==
- Alexi Glickman
- Burton Li
- Jeremy Black
- Steve Taylor

== Past members ==
- Zack Ehrlich
- Dave Tranchina
- Blythe Foster
- Ian Nansen
- Ryan Browne

== Related projects ==
- Apollo Sunshine
- Burgers
- Judgement Day
- Little Wings
- Lucky Cloud
- Papercuts
- Slumgum
- Sonny & the Sunsets

== Discography ==
- "The Botticellis," 2004 Self-Released (CD)
- "EP," 2006, Self-Released (CD)
- Old Home Movies, 2008 Antenna Farm Records (CD/Digital), Rocinante Records (LP)
- "Awaiting On You All / Table by the Window", 2008 Bellevue Records (Single)
