= Thin Line Fest =

Annual film and music festival in Texas, US

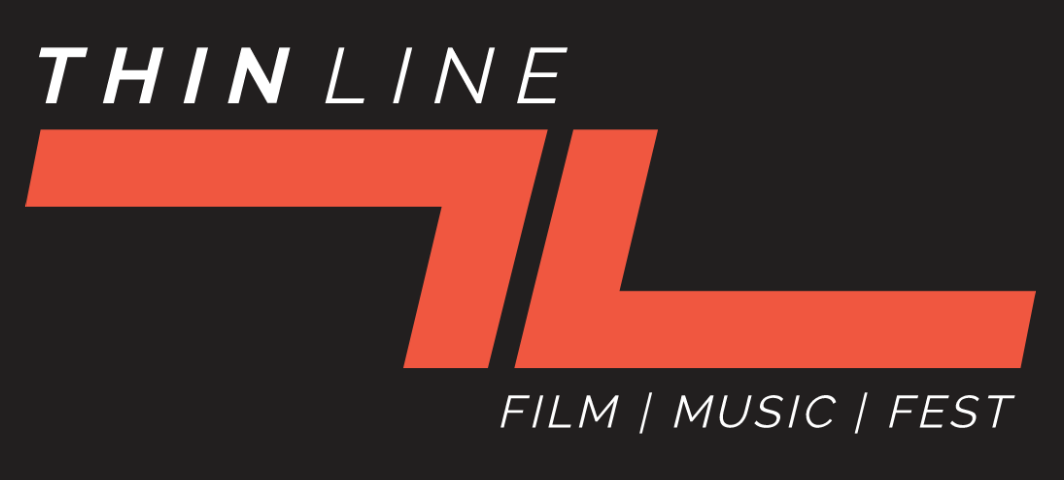
- Genre: Film, documentary, & music Festival
- Frequency: Annual
- Locations: Denton, Texas, U.S.
- Years active: 19
- Inaugurated: 2007
- Next event: March 18-22, 2026
- Organizer: City of Denton, Falcon Events
- Website: thinline.us

Thin Line Fest, often abbreviated as TL Fest, is an annual city-wide festival of film, music, and photography organized jointly that takes place during the spring in Denton, Texas, United States. The film portion of the festival is the longest running documentary film festival in Texas. The film sessions and music shows are spread across different venues across the city throughout the duration of the event. The Fest also hosts film award ceremonies. The festival includes a combination of local and international creators.

Due to the COVID-19 pandemic, the festival took place exclusively online in both 2020 and 2021.

In 2022, the festival ran from March 23 to 27, included over 50 film and short screenings, and over 50 live music performances at seven different venues.

== See also ==
- Denton Arts and Jazz Festival
- 35 Denton
