= Sarah Jaffe =

American singer-songwriter

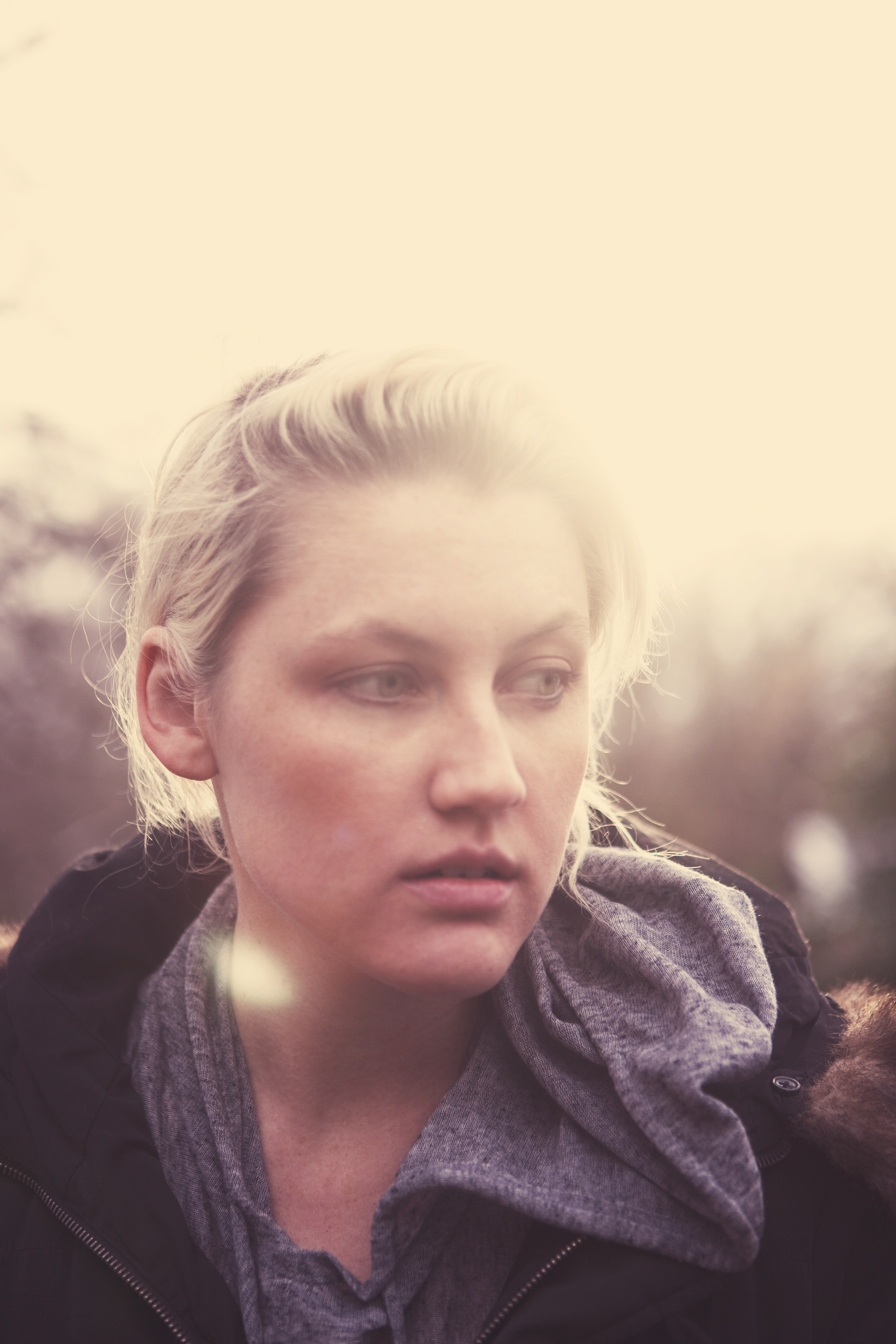
- Sarah Jaffe in 2011

Background information
- Born: Lufkin, Texas
- Origin: Denton, Texas
- Genres: Indie
- Occupation: Singer-songwriter
- Instruments: Vocals; Guitar; Bass; Drums
- Years active: 2007–present
- Label: Kirtland Records
- Website: SarahJaffe.com

Sarah Jaffe is an American singer-songwriter from Denton, Texas. Known for her distinctively clear vocals, she has worked as a singer-songwriter across many musical genres, including acoustic-folk, indie pop and hip hop.

== Early life ==
Jaffe was born in Lufkin in Angelina County, Texas. She has a sister. After a period during Jaffe's childhood when her family moved around Texas frequently, the family settled in Red Oak, Texas, outside of Dallas, where she grew up.

Jaffe's mom bought her a used acoustic guitar when she was 9 or 10 years old. She began playing music and performing when she was in high school in Dallas. She said that her family was musical, with her dad bringing influences of folk music and her mother that of the church choir. During this time, a local musician named Doug Burr was a mentor.

== Career ==
Jaffe played shows in Dallas, then moved to Los Angeles for a year, where she had cousins who were musicians. After her time in L.A., Jaffe relocated permanently to Denton, Texas, which has a vibrant music scene with local musicians from The University of North Texas's music program that Jaffe connected with as well as other musicians in the community that she began playing with on a regular basis.

In 2008, Jaffe self-released a six-song EP called Even Born Again. The record has been described as singer-songwriter gothic-folk, and features Jaffe on guitar accompanied by a cellist as well as another guitarist.

Even Born Again featured the first release of her song, "Clementine," which is one of Jaffe's most well-known songs and was featured on NPR's Song of the Day. Jaffe said that she wrote the song quickly during a tour with a band she was playing with in Arkansas. The song, which she wrote in 10 minutes, was meant as filler because the band didn't have enough songs. Jaffe said the audience had an immediate positive reaction to the song.

In late 2009, she was signed to Kirtland Records (Bob Schneider, Toadies), the Dallas-based record label co-owned by Deep Blue Something drummer John Kirtland and his wife, The Polyphonic Spree's Jenny Kirtland.

In May 2010, Jaffe released her first full-length album Suburban Nature, which was recorded in December 2008. The record feature layers of vocals and incorporates ambient music, with live performances often including a cello, a violin and/or violinists (sometimes a quartet), an additional guitar, a string section, keyboards, and a drummer, a big departure from Jaffe's initial EP, which was more stripped down sounding. The song "Clementine" appears on Suburban Nature, and a video of the song, which was shot in the summer in Texas, was made by Jon Todd Collins.

In 2011, she released an EP called The Way Sound Leaves a Room that included a DVD video performance at the Wyly Theatre in Dallas from February 2011. This record included a cover of Drake's song, "Shut it Down". It also included a live cover of the Robyn song, "Hang With Me." Jaffe said the EP started with the song, "A Sucker For Your Marketing," and was meant to be a lo-fi quick project to explore music beyond her initial acoustic work. She bought a second-hand bass guitar and drum set and learned how to play them, using the new instruments to explore this new musical direction.

On April 21, 2012, she released her second full-length album called The Body Wins, which was produced by fellow Texan John Congleton. When writing the record, Jaffe heavily incorporated the bass guitar and drum set she had bought for the prior EP, using the instruments to add rhythm, drums, and melodies, which fit with Congleton's approach to producing. The Body Wins continues a movement away from Jaffe's early acoustic guitar singer-songwriter sound and expansion into electropop tunes. As part of the promotion of the record, Jaffe performed "Talk", a single from that album, on Jimmy Kimmel Live! on December 11, 2012.

In 2012, Jaffe met fellow North Texas-based producer Symbolyc One also known as S1 (Beyoncé, Erykah Badu, Jay-Z, Madonna, Talib Kweli) during a session where the music producer collective The Cannabinoids was remixing Jaffe's “Glorified High,” a track from her 2012 record, The Body Wins.

S1 and Jaffe ended up forming a group called The Dividends. The name came from the idea of distribution of profits. The Dividends project resulted in an EP called Far From Away. Jaffe has said that she was a big hip hop music fan, but her music up until the collaboration with S1 had not explored beyond Americana and indie pop yet. The work with The Dividends removed the concept of genre and incorporated a diverse mixture of R&B, jazz, electronica, rock, and pop. Jaffe said helped her move past writer's block and into more creative genre-busting directions.

This collaboration with the South Dallas-based S1 led to Jaffe contributing vocals and lyrics to Eminem's song "Bad Guy" off his 2013 album The Marshall Mathers LP 2. S1 produced the first half of the song with M-Phazes, with the second track produced by StreetRunner.

In 2013 for Record Store Day, Jaffe sang a cover of PJ Harvey's "Down by the Water" on a 7-inch recording with The Toadies, an alternative rock band from Fort Worth, Texas. The track was recorded live at the 2012 Dia de los Toadies Festival.

In 2014, Jaffe released her third full-length record, Don't Disconnect. The record marked a big stylistic shift into what has been described as pop-rock. Don't Disconnect was produced by Midlake drummer and producer McKenzie Smith at Redwood Studio in Denton, Texas, which Smith owns with fellow Midlake bandmate, guitarist Joey McClellan. The song, "Some People Will Tell You," was listed as a Songs We Love by NPR.

In 2015, Jaffe released a remix EP called Visions. Visions features the single, "Vision," with Sam Lao and Zhora. The record has mixes by Mystery Skulls, S1, and Blue, The Misfit. As part of the promotion of the record, Jaffe performed with some of the artists on Visions, recreating the music live on stage at Trees in Dallas.

In 2017, Jaffe released her fourth full-length record, Bad Baby. Bad Baby opens with the track "Synthetic Love," which is over six minutes long. The album artwork is by the Los Angeles-based photographer Lindsey Byrnes and Brooklyn-based illustrator John Lisle.

=== Soundtracks ===
The 2011 film, Life Happens, features Jaffe's song "Clementine" during the end credits.

In 2013, Jaffe sang vocals on "The Blue Umbrella Suite" by Jon Brion, which was featured in The Blue Umbrella, a short film for 2013 Pixar movie Monsters University.

In 2015, Jaffe appeared in the film, Some Kind of Hate, singing her song "Before You Go," which is on the soundtrack to the film.

In 2016, the Irish comedy TV series Can't Cope, Won't Cope used the song "Glorifyed High" from Jaffe's 2012 record The Body Wins on its soundtrack.

Oculus Story Studio's short virtual reality film, Dear Angelica, which premiered at the Sundance Film Festival in January 2017, featured a new version of Jaffe's song, "All That Time." Dear Angelica stars Geena Davis and Mae Whitman. Jaffe knew the director, Saschka Unseld, from her experience working on The Blue Umbrella.

Also at the 2017 Sundance Film Festival is Augustine Frizzell's feature film, Never Goin' Back, which Jaffe contributed some original songs. Never Goin' Back stars Camila Morrone and Maia Mitchell (The Fosters).

=== Touring ===
In 2012, Jaffe performed as an opener on the New Multitudes tour, a Woody Guthrie tribute album with a band made up of Jay Farrar, Will Johnson, Anders Parker, and Jim James.

Jaffe has toured with Lou Barlow, Norah Jones, Blitzen Trapper, Astronautalis, The Polyphonic Spree, Why?, and Chelsea Wolfe, as well as fellow Texas-based bands Midlake, Old 97's and Centro-matic.

=== Band ===
Jaffe frequently plays with and has collaborated with multi-instrumentalist Robert Gomez on electric guitar. Becki Howard contributed violin on many of Jaffe's records. Her core band is made up of Don Cento on guitar, Scott Danbom (Centro-matic) on keyboards, and Matt Pence (Centro-matic) and sometimes Roberto Sanchez on drums. Pence often produces Jaffe's records.

== Activism ==
In 2017, Jaffe signed a letter of protest and performed "Clementine" with St. Vincent in protest of the proposal of Texas Legislature's Bathroom Bill, which discriminates against transgender people using bathrooms that don't match their gender identity.

== Honors and awards ==
- 2008: Dallas Observer, Dallas Observer Music Awards (DOMA) – Best Solo Act
- 2008: Dallas Observer, Dallas Observer Music Awards (DOMA) – Best Folk/Acoustic Act
- 2008: Dallas Observer, Dallas Observer Music Awards (DOMA) – Best Female Vocalist

== Discography ==
=== Albums ===
- 2010: Suburban Nature (Kirtland Records)
- 2012: The Body Wins (Kirtland Records)
- 2014: Don't Disconnect (Kirtland Records)
- 2017: Bad Baby (Kirtland Records)

=== EPs ===
- 2008: Even Born Again EP (Kirtland Records)
- 2011: The Way Sound Leaves a Room EP (Kirtland Records)
- 2015: Visions remix EP (Kirtland Records)
- 2019: SMUT EP (Kirtland Records)

=== Singles ===
- 2010: Clementine CD single (Kirtland Records)
- 2012: Glorified High (The Cannabinoids Remix) single (Kirtland Records)
- 2012: Stay With Me single (Kirtland Records) – tracks: "Stay With Me" / "Face"
- 2012: Vulnerable single (Kirtland Records) – tracks: "Vulnerable" / "Two Intangibles Can't Be Had (Working For a Nuclear Free City Remix)"
- 2012: Glorified High single (Kirtland Records)
- 2013: Foggy Field (Remix) featuring Jimmy Lazers single (Kirtland Records)
- 2014: Lover Girl (Radio Edit) single (Kirtland Records)
- 2016: Did David Feel Like This? single (Kirtland Records)
- 2017: Bad Baby single (Kirtland Records)

=== The Dividends ===
with S1 aka Symbolyc One

- 2013: "The Dividends Feat. Raekwon ‘Fool’s Gold’" track
- 2013: "Must Come Down" by 360 (feat. PEZ) track – co-wrote
- 2016: "Far From Away" EP by The Dividends (Kirtland Records)
- 2017: Hide&Seek compiled by The Foreign Exchange (Reel People Music Limited) – track: "Summer Glo (feat. Sam Lao)"

=== Soundtracks ===
- 2011: Life Happens – track: "Clementine" in end credits
- 2013: The Blue Umbrella Original Soundtrack by Jon Brion with Sarah Jaffe (Walt Disney Records) – single: "The Blue Umbrella Suite (feat. Sarah Jaffe)" / "The Blue Umbrella Suite (Instrumental)"
- 2015: Some Kind of Hate soundtrack – track: "Before You Go"
- 2016: Can't Cope, Won't Cope – track: "Glorifyed High"
- 2017: Dear Angelica soundtrack (Oculus Story Studio) – track: "All That Time" (new version)
- 2017: Never Goin' Back – original songs

=== Other contributions ===
- 2007: Strung Through De Gaulle by The Wallace Virgil (High City) – vocals
- 2008: Pomegranate by Astronautalis (Eyeball Records) – tracks: vocals and written by on "17 Summers" and "Two Years Before the Mast (feat. Sarah Jaffe)"
- 2009: Pine Sticks And Phosphorus by Robert Gomez – vocals (Nova Posta)
- 2009: Molina And Johnson by Jason Molina and Will Johnson (Secretly Canadian) – vocals
- 2009: Rider. Shadow. Wolf. by Magnolia Electric Co 45 (Secretly Canadian) – vocals on "Josephine"
- 2010: Queen of Denmark by John Grant (Bella Union) – vocals on "Supernatural Defibrillator"
- 2012: Hi-Heels & Low-Lifes by Josh Baze (Cartel Records) – track: "Where I Am (feat. Sarah Jaffe)"
- 2012: John Singer Sergeant: The Music And Songs Of John Dufilho (Kirtland Records) – tracks: "Married To The Sea" with vocals by Marcus Striplin and Jaffe "Gone In A Second" with vocals by Jaffe, Spyche, and Tony Miller
- 2012: Fill Your Lungs by Ending People EP (Cash Cow) – track: "Pretender Pt. 1" written by
- 2013: The Marshall Mathers LP 2 by Eminem (Aftermath Records/Shady Records/Interscope Records) – vocals (as S. Jaffe) on "Bad Guy"
- 2013: Down by the Water by PJ Harvey performed by Toadies With Sarah Jaffe / Rattlers Revival performed by Toadies Featuring The Honeybear Horns CD split (Kirtland Records)
- 2014: Daytrotter Presents No. 17: Sarah Jaffe / David Ramirez (Daytrotter Records) – split 12-inch vinyl, A-side tracks: "A Sucker For Your Marketing / Vulnerable" / "Two Intangibles Can't Be Had" / "Clementine"
- 2014: Farewell Transmission: The Music Of Jason Molina (Rock The Cause) – track: "Alone With The Owl"
- 2014: A Very Merry Denton by Various Artists (Denton Holiday Lighting Festival) – track: "O Holy Night"
- 2015: Heretics by Toadies (Kirtland Records) – vocals on "Beside You"
- 2016: Desperate Times: Songs Of The Old 97s – track: "The New Kid"
- 2017: Corner Suns by Corner Suns (Idol Records) – vocals on tracks: "Trance" and "The Rattle In The Room"
- 2017: Perfect Night, for a Funeral by Blue, the Misfit (HIGH STANDARDz) – track: "Live Forever (feat. Sarah Jaffe)"

== See also ==
- Music of Denton, Texas
