= The Last Bison =

American indie folk band

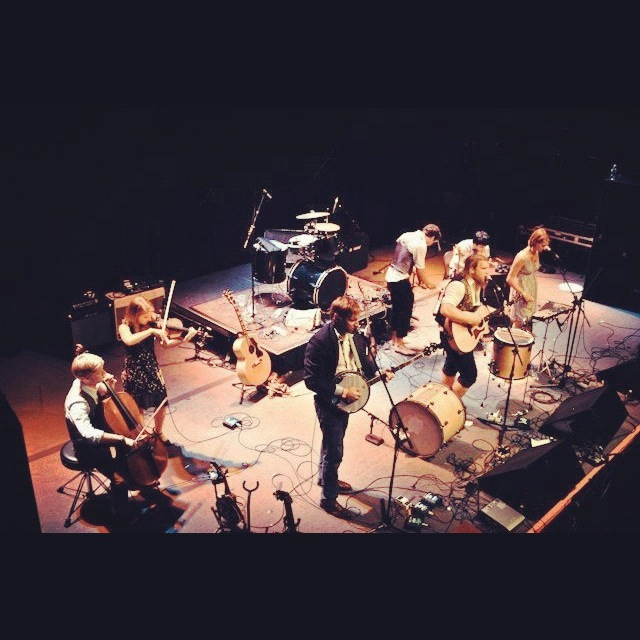
- The Last Bison at the NorVa Theater

Background information
- Origin: Chesapeake, Virginia, U.S.
- Genres: Indie folk, indie rock, folk rock, roots rock
- Years active: 2010–present
- Labels: AntiFragile, Universal
- Website: www.thelastbison.com

The Last Bison, formerly known as Bison, is an American indie folk band formed in Chesapeake, Virginia. The Last Bison originally dubbed their sound "mountaintop chamber music," combining elements of alternative indie-folk with classical sensibilities. Their first album Quill was released independently in September 2011 and received critical praise, noting the band's complex arrangements, refined lyrics, and vocal harmonies.

== History ==
The band initially received airplay on WROX-FM in Norfolk, Virginia. James Steele, the station's program director, stated that "Switzerland", the first single from their debut album, prompted the biggest audience response of any tune in his five years at the station. The band was signed to Universal Republic records in 2012, and released 3 projects with the label: the Inheritance EP, the Inheritance album, and the Sleigh Ride EP. The option to continue for another album cycle with Republic was not renewed, and in February 2014 the band became independent. In April 2014, The Last Bison began recording their third full-length album, VA, which was released independently in September 2014. They released an EP, Dorado, in 2015.

Ben Hardesty's (vocals and guitar) songwriting bears sonic resemblance to groups such as Fleet Foxes, Mumford and Sons, and The Decemberists. Folkhive stated "Dare I say that [The Last] Bison is to folk what Arcade Fire is to indie rock? Boasting seven members and a sound seemingly born on the tree-covered mountaintops of Virginia, [The Last] Bison lays down expansive and yet imminently listenable folk with an original feel I've not experienced in quite some time". The band incorporates traditional folk instruments with a reed organ, percussion, and classical strings. Independent Clauses stated "[The Last] Bison's debut album Quill uses the seriousness of Fleet Foxes' grounded sound as a framework, layering strings, bells, and more on top. "Iscariot" and "The Woodcutter's Son" have a darkly pastoral bent that recalls pre-The King Is Dead Decemberists." The Last Bison has headlined the Norva Theatre in Norfolk as well as performed with the Virginia Symphony Orchestra. The Daily Press said of Bison's live performance, "The stars of [the] show did not disappoint. Bison skillfully performed complex arrangements and delivered songs with passion and sensitivity [...] [The Last] Bison is a unique musical outfit that creates an unusual energy on stage."

== Name change ==
According to an e-mail sent out by the band on July 20, 2012, they officially changed their name from Bison to The Last Bison to avoid confusion with an identically named band.

== Members ==
- Ben Hardesty – lead guitar, vocals, percussion
- Amos Housworth – cello, bass guitar

=== Previous members ===
- Jay Benfante – percussion
- Teresa Totheroh – violin
- David Solomon – percussion
- Dan Hardesty – banjo, mandolin, guitar, backing vocals
- Annah Housworth – bells, percussion, backing vocals
- Jonathan Smalt – percussion
- Andrew Benfante – reed organ, keyboards, guitar

== Discography ==
- Quill (2011, independent)

Recorded in two days live at Minimum Wage Recording in Richmond, Virginia and released September 2011.

- Inheritance (2013, Universal Republic)

Recorded in July 2012 at Fairfax Recording in Van Nuys, California. The Inheritance EP was released in October 2012. The full length came out in March 2013 and was a mix of re-recorded songs from Quill as well as brand new songs.

- Sleigh Ride (2013, Universal Republic)

Recorded at Minimum Wage Recording in Richmond and released November 2013.

- VA (2014, independent)

Recorded in the Wigwam A-Frame on site at Triple R Ranch and at Parroco Production in Chesapeake. The full-length album was released September 2014.

- Dorado (2015, independent)

Songs for Dorado were taken from the writing and recording sessions for the VA album.

- Süda (2018)

Tracked at COLLECTOR studios in Norfolk, VA in the summer of 2016
