= Sub Oslo =

American band

Sub Oslo is an improvisational band from Denton, Texas, that plays psychedelic/ambient dub. The band was formed in 1996 by Miguel Veliz and Quincy Holloway, who were roommates at the time. Since then the band has expanded to include a total of eight members. When Sub Oslo performs live, they have a visual artist working live to display visualizations projected onto a screen, and incorporate a mix engineer, allowing performances to be different each time. Sub Oslo has toured the West Coast, Japan, and has also had their music featured in the Xbox videogame Brute Force. They have also performed alongside influential dub artists such as Mad Professor, Steel Pulse and The Roots. They also performed with less known artists such as Fugazi, Raz Mesanai, the Make-up, Yeti, Him, June of 44, and DJ Krush.

== Discography ==
- 12'' EP - (self titled) (out of print)
  - Prisoner of Dub
  - Science Dub
  - Dubalicious
- CD - Dubs in the key of Life
  - Stratospheric Penetration
  - Celestial Dub
  - Melafrica
  - Reel to Reel Dub
  - Mi Familia Re-Dub
  - Washes of Dub
- CD - The Rites of Dub
  - Goatsucker Dub
  - Sep Dub
  - Control This
  - Sub Oslo vs. Bookshelf Speakers
  - Dark and Lovely
  - 13th Hour Dub

== Band members ==
- Quincy Holloway - Drums
- Miguel Veliz - Bass
- Frank Cervantez - Guitar
- Moses Mayo|Eyad Kaileh - Percussion
- Brandan Uribe - Flute/Percussion/Piano
- Alán Uribe - Clavinet/Synth/Melodica
- John Nuckels - Mixing/effects/samples
- Paul Baker - Live Visuals/Video artist
