= Capsula =

Argentine psychedelic rock band

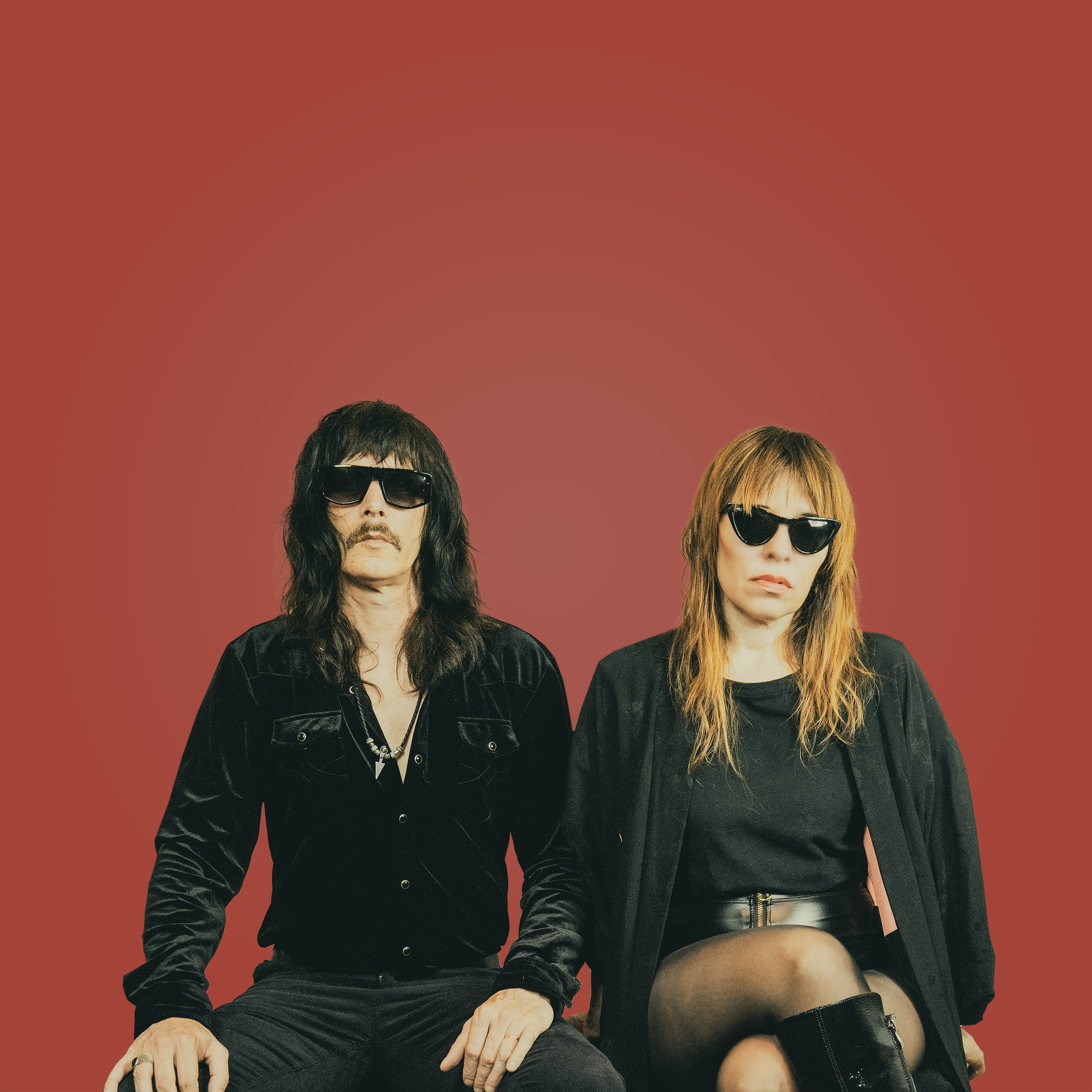
- Capsula, 2025

Background information
- Origin: Buenos Aires, Argentina
- Genres: Alternative rock; psychedelic rock; space-rock
- Years active: 1998–present
- Labels: BCore Disc; Hotsak; Vicious Circle; Silver Recordings
- Website: capsulacapsula.com

Capsula is a psychedelic rock band from Buenos Aires, Argentina, formed as a power trio. The band consists of a core formed by Martín Guevara (guitar, vocals) and Coni Duchess (Lisica) (bass, vocals), with Gonzalo Criado on drums. Their music blends psychedelic and alternative rock, characterized by powerful riffs and a guitar-driven sound.

Formed in 1998 in Buenos Aires, Capsula has remained active since its inception as a touring and recording band, with activity across Europe, the United States, and South America.

== 1997–2006: Early releases and relocation to Bilbao ==
Capsula self-released its debut albums Sublime (1999) and Yudoka (2000) in Argentina. At the time, the band drew influence from psychedelic and space rock, including Spacemen 3.

After relocating to Bilbao, the band recorded their self-titled album Capsula, released in 2002 through the Basque independent label DDT Diskak.

In 2005, Capsula recorded Songs & Circuits, which was released in 2006 and later distributed internationally by Northern Star Records. Around this time, the band also recorded a stripped-down version of The Velvet Underground’s "Run, Run, Run", tuned down to drop D and arranged in a minimalist style.

The release of Songs & Circuits was followed by touring activity across Europe and South America.

== 2007–2011: Rising Mountains and international touring ==
Following the release of Songs & Circuits (2006), Capsula increased their activity within the European circuit. After being seen live in Berlin, the band signed with the independent label BCore Disc in October 2008.

Capsula released Rising Mountains in April 2009. The album was issued in multiple vinyl editions and was followed by touring activity across Europe and South America.

In 2009, Capsula performed at the SXSW festival in Austin, Texas, where their live set drew attention for its intensity. Rolling Stone critic David Fricke highlighted the band’s performance, comparing their sound to elements associated with The Who and referencing Pink Floyd’s “Set the Controls for the Heart of the Sun”. Following the festival, Capsula expanded their touring activity in the United States, performing across the West Coast, East Coast, and southern regions.

In 2011, Capsula released In the Land of Silver Souls through BCore Disc, produced by John Agnello, who had become involved with the band after seeing them perform live. The album was followed by touring in the United States, including performances at KEXP’s Concerts at the Mural in Seattle. A live recording of the song “Magnetic Brain,” recorded at KEXP, was later included on the compilation Live At… KEXP – Volume Seven (2011). The band also continued touring in South America, including performances in Colombia, Argentina, Chile, and Uruguay.

== 2012–2018: Solar Secrets, Santa Rosa and international touring ==
In 2012, Capsula recorded a personal reinterpretation of David Bowie’s The Rise and Fall of Ziggy Stardust and the Spiders from Mars, produced by John Agnello. The recording followed the band’s continued touring activity and interest in reworking classic material within a live-driven sound. The process was documented in the film Dreaming of Ziggy Stardust, which was selected for the Official Section of the Dock of the Bay Music Documentary Film Festival in San Sebastián.

In 2013, Capsula released Solar Secrets, produced by Tony Visconti, who became involved with the band after seeing them perform in Brooklyn, New York. The album drew conceptual inspiration from Argentine painter Xul Solar and marked the band’s first collaboration with Visconti after his work on David Bowie’s The Next Day. The release was followed by extensive touring in the United States and Europe, including performances with Os Mutantes and appearances at festivals such as Austin Psych Fest. According to The Austin Chronicle, Capsula’s performance at Austin Psych Fest in 2013 stood out for its intensity and generated a strong audience response.

The band continued touring internationally across Europe and the Americas during this period. In November 2015, Capsula opened for Pearl Jam in Argentina. The group also recorded multiple live sessions for Seattle-based radio station KEXP.

In 2016, Capsula released Santa Rosa, which expanded on the band’s use of cinematic and atmospheric elements. The album was released in France by Vicious Circle, marking a further step into the European circuit. Its release was followed by extensive touring in France and across Europe.

== 2019–present: Bestiarium, Phantasmaville and Primitivo Astral ==
In 2018, Capsula began work on Bestiarium, an album inspired by antique bestiaries and the films of Jean Cocteau. Each track was conceived around a hybrid figure combining human, animal, and symbolic elements. The album was recorded at the band’s studio, Silver Recordings, and released on March 22, 2019, by the French independent label Vicious Circle.

In 2021, Capsula released Phantasmaville through their own label, Silver Recordings. The album expanded the band’s psychedelic rock approach while incorporating darker tonalities and rhythmic influences. Its release was followed by touring activity across Europe, South America, and the United States.

In 2024, Capsula released Primitivo Astral, recorded, mixed, and mastered at Silver Recordings in Bilbao. The album developed a concept centred on primal and cosmic imagery, continuing the band’s exploration of science fiction and mythological themes through a guitar-driven sound.

Primitivo Astral received coverage from international music publications. In France, Rock & Folk, in an article by Jérôme Soligny, highlighted the album’s contemporary approach to psychedelic rock, while in the United Kingdom, Clash Magazine described the album as blending psychedelic rock with post-punk elements, framed by experimental production and influences drawn from 1960s and 1970s rock. The album’s release was supported by international radio exposure, including the premiere of the single “Spelling Love” on Seattle-based radio station KEXP.

== Discography ==
=== Studio albums ===
- Sublime (1999; reissued 2012). Hotsak
- Yudoka (2000; reissued 2012). Hotsak
- Capsula (2002; reissued 2012). Hotsak
- Songs & Circuits (2006). Discos Liliput
- Rising Mountains (2009). BCore Disc
- Ivan Julian & Capsula – The Naked Flame (2009). Bloody Hotsak, 02:59 Records
- In the Land of Silver Souls (2011). Krian Music Group, BCore Disc
- Dreaming of Ziggy Stardust (2012)
- Solar Secrets (2013). Krian Music Group
- Santa Rosa (2016). Silver Recordings, Vicious Circle, Hotsak
- Bestiarium (2019). Vicious Circle, Dynamo Tapes, Silver Recordings, Hotsak
- Phantasmaville (2021). Silver Recordings, Adrenalinfix Music, After Before, Head Records
- Primitivo Astral (2024). Silver Recordings

=== Live albums ===
- Dead or Alive (2014). Hotsak, Krian Music Group

== Filmography ==
- Dreaming of Ziggy Stardust (2014)
