= My Education (band) =

- Genres: Post-rock, Instrumental
- Years active: 2000–present
- Labels: Somewherecold Records, Golden Antenna Records

My Education is an American instrumental post-rock band from Austin, Texas. They create cinematic and psychedelic compositions blending intense droning guitars with melodic viola. The core of the band is two guitars, bass, drums, and viola, although they do play with violins, keyboards and vibes at times. Golden Antenna Records, a label based in Hessen, Germany, released the band's LP A Drink for All My Friends in March 2013.

== History ==
Since forming in 1999, the band's membership has expanded and contracted, and it is currently a five-piece ensemble. My Education has released nine full-length albums, several singles, compilation appearances, and a 12" vinyl collaboration with avant-hip hop duo Dälek. Their recordings have been remixed by members of the bands Kinski, Pelican, the Red Sparowes and Dälek.

The band has toured the United States many times including an east coast jaunt in April 2009 and a west coast tour in the summer of 2010. A 19-date European tour was completed in the spring of 2013. A remix of songs from the 2010 Sunrise release was issued in 2011, and a limited live “official bootleg” of the 2010 tour was issued in 2012. My Education has also collaborated with the Salt Lake City improvisational band Theta Naught, which has resulted in Sound Mass, an LP/CD release, as well as a string of festival appearances both in Utah and in Texas as live broadcasts, studio sessions and an as-yet-untitled second LP. The band is currently working on both film and modern dance collaborations. In October 2022, the band released its ninth album, Emka, through Somewherecold Records.

== Musical style ==
The band's sound generally falls within the genre of instrumental post-rock. In an interview, the band states that their influences are “all over the map. The most important thing is to stake out your claim to whatever sliver of originality you can come up with, and pursue it with intensity, conviction, and rabid abandon.” My Education's live score to the F.W. Murnau classic silent film Sunrise has packed houses across the country and was described by a critic as “one of the best movie-going experiences of my life. It knocked me out”, and “silver tones swirl from scene to scene until you almost forget it's a silent film. During the loudest part of the 96-minute set – a scene in which the Man and the Wife face gale force winds while crossing a lake – there's still a sense of restraint and elegance. It's the German way. The band, dressed in all black, lurks in the shadows."

== Members ==
- Brian Purington - Guitar
- Chris Hackstie - Guitar
- James Alexander - Viola
- Scott Telles - Bass
- Earl Bowers - Drums
- Kirk Laktas - Keyboards

with

- Vincent Durcan - Percussion/Drums
- Sarah Norris - Vibraphone
- Skye Ashbrook – Visuals/Design

Former members

- Christopher Stelly
- Joe Covington
- Eric Gibbons
- Ryan Nelson
- Sean Seagler

== Discography ==
- A Drink For All My Friends - LP/CD/digital 2013 (Haute Magie (US)/Golden Antenna (Europe))
- Sunrise Remixes – ltd. CD/digital 2011 (Reverb Worship)
- Bamboozled – ltd. live tour CD 2012 (blue circle)
- Sunrise - LP/CD/digital April 2010 (Strange Attractors Audio House (US)/Golden Antenna (Europe))
- Bad Vibrations – CD/digital 2008 (Strange Attractors Audio House)
- my education vs Dalek - 12" EP 2007 (Thirty Ghosts Records)
- Moody Dipper - CD 2006 (Thirty Ghosts Records)
- Italian - CD 2005 (Thirty Ghosts Records)
- 5 Popes - CD 2004 (Thirty Ghosts Records)
- "Concentration Waltz" b/w "Plans A through B" - 7" Single 2002 (Jonathan Whiskey)
- "Aria" b/w "Half-Empty" 7” single 2000 (self-released)
- "Dirty Hands" on Test Tones Vol. 3 - Compilation 2005 (Clairecords)
- "Thanksgiving" on The Speed by Which We Fall - Compilation 2005 (Rollerderby Records)
- "Aria" on Austin Texas Mean Music - Compilation 2007 - (Amp. FM)
- "A Drink For All My Friends" (remix) on the Gutterth Vol 4 - Compilation 2012 (Gutterth Records)
- (with Theta Naught) Sound Mass LP/CD/digital 2011 – (Differential Records)
- Emka CD 2022 (Somewherecold Records)
