= Baptist Generals =

American indie band

The Baptist Generals
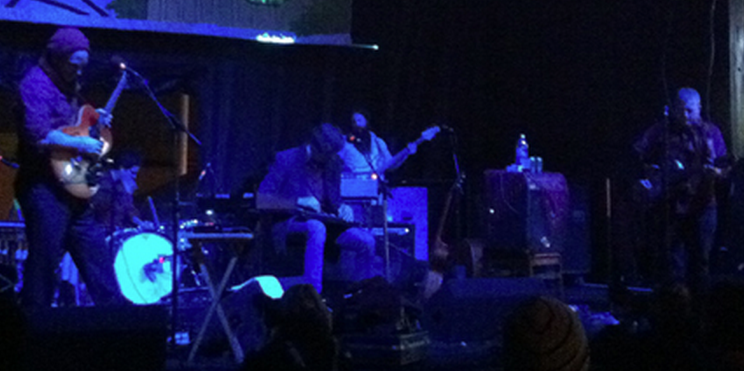
- Baptist Generals at 35 Denton March 9, 2012

Background information
- Origin: Denton, Texas, United States
- Genres: Indie rock, folk
- Label: Sub Pop
- Website: thebaptistgenerals.com

The Baptist Generals are an American indie band from Denton, Texas. The band's releases include a nine-song EP, Dog, released in 1998 on the now-defunct Quality Park Records, as well as the LP No Silver/No Gold, released in 2003 on Sub Pop Records.

The Baptist Generals were formed in 1998 by singer-songwriter Chris "Cee" Flemmons and drummer Steve Hill. Flemmons is the son of the late Fort Worth Star-Telegram travel editor, Texana author, and Texas historian Jerry Flemmons. Attending junior college in Wisconsin, Hill worked as a drummer for John Zorn while Zorn developed his music game piece, Cobra.

Originally the band played for beer money as a street act on Denton's infamous Fry Street, but later moved from the street to playing house shows and then clubs nationally and abroad. Over the years the band has grown to include a rotating cast of Denton and former Denton musicians. Hill left the band in 2007.

In 2007 the group refined their live show, choosing to move away from their amplified presentation in favor of chamber style acoustic sets performed on the band's traveling rug in alternative spaces such as art galleries, museums and non-bar facilities.

In March 2012 the band returned to electrified performance as part of 35 Denton, a festival Flemmons founded and spent many years organizing.

On August 23, 2012, the Baptist Generals announced on their fan page that they had completed a new album. On May 21, 2013, their third album, Jackleg Devotional to the Heart, was released on Sub Pop.

== Discography ==
Albums

- Dog (1998)
- Void Touching Faster Victuals (EP) (2002)
- No Silver/No Gold (2003)
- Jackleg Devotional to the Heart (2013)
