= South High School (Minnesota) =

High school in Minneapolis, Minnesota

Minneapolis South High School

Location
- 3131 19th Avenue South; Minneapolis, Minnesota 55407; United States; 44°56′44″N 93°14′37″W

Information
- Type: Public
- Established: 1885
- School district: Minneapolis Public Schools
- Principal: Ahmed Amin
- Staff: 91.03 (FTE)
- Faculty: 107
- Grades: 9–12
- Enrollment: 1,261 (2023-2024)
- Student to teacher ratio: 13.85
- Campus: Urban
- Colors: Orange and Black
- Athletics: Minneapolis City Conference
- Mascot: Gallant Tiger
- Newspaper: The Southerner
- Website: south.mpschools.org

Minneapolis South High School is a comprehensive public high school in the Corcoran neighborhood of Minneapolis, Minnesota. Founded in 1885, the school is housed in a building constructed in 1970 that features a blend of modern and historic architectural styles. As part of the Minneapolis Public Schools district, South is the oldest continuously operating public high school in Minneapolis. It is renowned for its strong academic programs and its focus on the arts, including theater and music, as well as its offerings in science, technology, engineering, and mathematics (STEM).

== History ==
=== Origins ===
Minneapolis South High School was founded in 1885 in four rooms of the attic of the Adams School at Franklin Avenue and 16th Avenue. The student body began publishing the South High Observer, the direct predecessor of the current school paper, The Southerner. South High Theater presented its first play, Cox, and Box, in 1892. The school's first graduating class totaled 25 students. Within a few years, South had outgrown the Adams School space and the Minneapolis School Board began a search for a new location for the school.

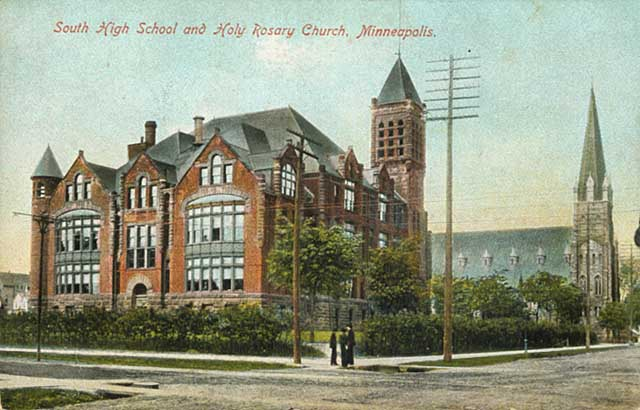
Postcard featuring South High School in 1900

The first South High School building was completed on or around January 1, 1892, and in 1893, South High School's 250 students and the adjoining middle school's 208 students moved to their new facility at 24th St & Cedar Avenue.

The new building was built out of red brick and sandstone in a castle-like structure. It had several turrets, 12-foot ceilings, stained-glass bay windows, and a six-story bell tower. After the final part of the building, the bell tower, was erected, the School Board decided not to purchase a bell for it. The reasons for this are unclear, but it is thought that the large bell used to mark the beginning and end of classes was abandoned in favor of an electric bell system run by a motor. The bell tower remained until the building around it was destroyed.

The student body had grown to between 750 and 800 students by 1909. The building had become too small, and the auditorium was sacrificed for more classrooms by dividing it into quarters using green curtains. The Minneapolis School Board decided changes needed to be made.

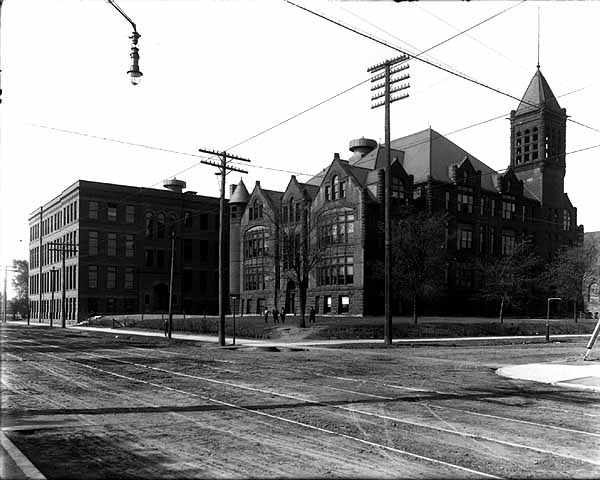
South High School in 1911.

That first significant change came in September 1910 when the new manual and training wings were opened. This new part of the school allowed students to be trained in business and other commercial professions. The highest reported number of students taking classes in this part of the school at any time was 800 students, using 149 typewriters along with other equipment. In January 1911, a new auditorium was opened up to the graduating class, with an initial seating capacity of 1,913. In contrast, South High's current auditorium has a listed seating capacity of 715. The new auditorium space, along with the manual and training wings, had a new style of architecture. No clear pictures of these additions are available, and the only description offered for the style was "medieval".

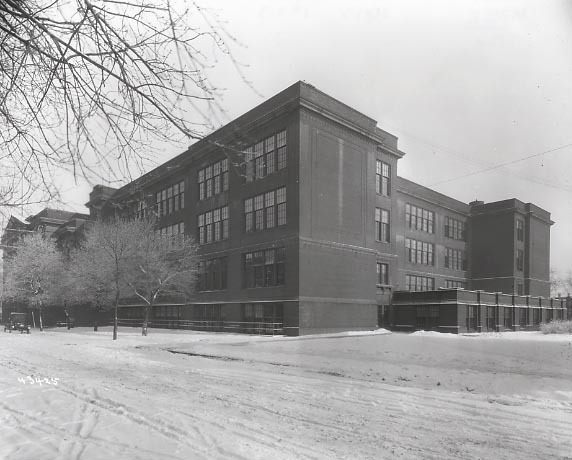
1916 addition shown in 1923.

The school's final extension came in 1916. Most of the original structure was demolished to make room for a new large building. The new structure, still connected to the old one and the manual and training wings, followed the architectural style of its time, with a square look and evenly cut windows, at least one to a room.

=== The "Golden Age" ===
With this last part of the central school building added, South High School became one of Minneapolis's architectural wonders, featuring three different sections with different architectural styles linked together.

This paragraph from the January 1927 Parent-Teacher Broadcaster summarizes the appearance:

[T]he building itself...is so constructed that its architecture may be easily spoken of as ancient, medieval, and modern; or, in other words, there is the old main building with its fantastic design, than the manual training wing, medieval in structure, and lastly, the new building of modern architecture. The whole, colossal in size and modern to the nth degree, is set in extensive grounds, which may later be used for additional building sites. We discover a large manual training department where every line of work properly falling under that head is adequately housed and furnished with wonderfully complete equipment. We are pleased that all classrooms are wonderfully large, light, and airy.

After World War I, work began on an athletic field across Cedar Avenue from the building. Augsburg University's football team used the South football field as its home field from 1926 to 1945.

South High parents and teachers requested a number of changes to the school in 1924. These included a new chorus room, or band room, to seat 400 students, fireproofing and alteration of the auditorium, a new gymnasium, and improvement of the athletic field. In 1926, the auditorium was remodeled and fireproofed, a process that cut the seating capacity from 1,913 to 1,655. At the same time, sets of stairs were added leading out to Cedar Avenue to relieve ever-growing congestion at entryways. The band room was expanded, facilitating its rampant growth and eventually spurring other schools to develop programs of their own. The athletic field was finished, complete with a concrete fence, comfortable seating, and a large gateway dedicated to South alumni who died in World War I. The old gymnasium was replaced by two new ones, separated by a partition—one side for boys, the other for girls.

The height of what is known as South's Golden Age, from 1916 to about 1940, came, ironically, during the height of the Great Depression. In 1933, South High School had 2,820 enrolled students, and, despite the misery in the outside world, the school continued to grow and prosper and show students the possibility of a better life.

The end of the old South High building came in the 1940s, as its oldest part started to show its age. The stonework had begun to crumble. The wooden floors that comprised all of the sections of the school were warped and wavy. The furnishings and old art that lined the walls were still present. Few classes were held in the old section of the school, and when it rained, the roof leaked, sending water streaming down into the hallways.

In 1950, demolition began on the front of the old school, which was met with vigorous protest, a large part of it from alumni. It took until 1953 to destroy the oldest third of the building, leaving the other two parts untouched.

They did not remain untouched long. In 1961, South High principal Carl Lundin petitioned the Minneapolis School Board for a new building. The Citizens Group, a group of people interested in saving historic buildings, protested. Their protest was met with counterprotest, setting off a seven-year period of division. Several different sites were considered for a new South High, one of which was selected four and a half years after the original proposal. The plans met further trouble when a building plan could not be agreed on. The proposal that brought the most anguish after it was rejected was the City Council's refusal to close 31st street to accommodate an athletic field. Contracts for the New South were finally awarded in early October 1968 and a groundbreaking ceremony was held on October 11, 1968, using five shovels engraved with the letters "SOUTH". The class of 1970 was the last class to graduate in the old building.

=== The New South ===
The open house for the new South High School was held on October 11, 1970, two years after the groundbreaking ceremony.

At the time, the nation was experiencing great turmoil due to the prolonged Vietnam War and the government's coverup of vital information about it. Construction of the New South began in 1968, the year when public opinion of the war took a big turn for the worse. Just a few months before the gala open house for the new building, the Kent State shootings occurred: National Guardsmen killed four students during a protest against the war and government policy, sparking a new nationwide round of student protest.

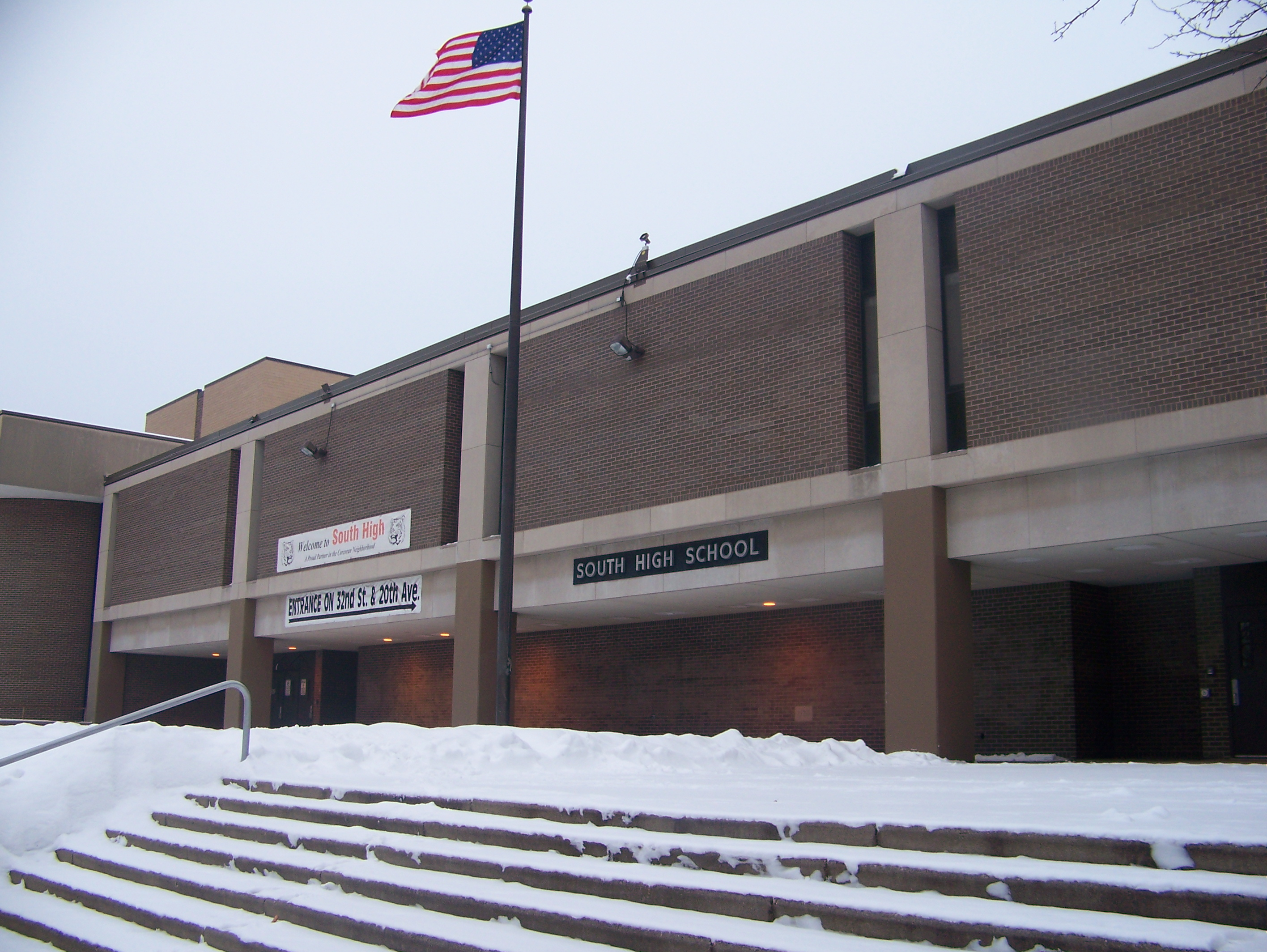
"Front" (west) doors of South High School. The true entrance is adjacent to the parking lot on the south side of the building.

From the outside, South looks like a brick fortress. The building might have been designed to thwart student unrest. The original building has no windows. Structures from this period tend to lack windows, which could be quickly destroyed during violent protest, a common occurrence, making them at best expensive to replace and at worst a public safety hazard. The original floor plans also changed with more additions, such as the third floor, added in the late 1990s with the seeming innovation of windows. [NOTE: this is not confirmed by any architectural or other proposals or plans. In fact, the architectural design reflects the designwork done on countless office buildings at the time.]

But students at South High were given a plausible explanation for the somewhat prisonlike design. The building's architect was from Texas, and his concern for energy efficiency over the long winters caused him to eschew extensive use of windows. Also, when the building first opened, it was an "Open School", with no individual classrooms on the second floor. The small windows in the design provided light across the open area. Only when the school was converted to typical classroom divisions did the lack of natural light become an issue. [NOTE: according to the architectural plans, the building was designed to meet the needs of modular programming. This required an open resource area, lined with resource rooms. When the district decided modular programming was not working, the walls were constructed to return the school to a more traditional setting. It was at this point that the lack of windows became a problem and the "maze" was necessary in order to meet classroom size and number requirements. The original plans accommodated 1,500 students, but South's enrollment has held steady at 2,000. The building is still short at least seven classrooms, despite the internal remodel to meet growing needs.]

The original floor plan was open, in keeping with the educational philosophies of the time. Ideally, such a configuration would allow for shared learning among students in different classes. But the floor plan produced distractions, and additional interior walls were later added to separate the classrooms. The construction of classrooms after the fact created a "rabbit maze" of identical hallways and in some instances classrooms only accessible via other classrooms.

=== Current architecture ===
South High School is a three-story building, centered around the auditorium, commons area, and balcony. When school starts in the morning two sets of doors are open, both leading into the commons area. Each student is issued an identification card, which is checked upon entry through all entrances, to ensure the safety of students and staff. 11th and 12th grade students are given off-campus privileges for lunch. Students must submit an off-campus lunch form to be allowed off-campus. This privilege can be revoked for failing classes, returning late from off campus three times in a semester, or disciplinary problems.

First Floor

The first floor contains the main office, auditorium, lunchroom, gymnasium, technology/shop classrooms, special program centers (such as the All Nations program), and various other classrooms. The band and orchestra classes are also on the first floor. In 2001, the auto shop was turned into a band room to meet that department's ever-growing needs, and the ventilation system was remade to allow for more efficient air conditioning. In 2007, a project to renovate all of Minneapolis's public high school auditoriums moved on to South's auditorium. The renovations, which had finished by the beginning of the 2007–08 school year, include new lighting and sound equipment, an extensive box for lighting and sound control, two sets of double doors at the main auditorium entrance, and a wheelchair-accessible balcony. Theatrical performances on the stage began in spring 2007. Due to space restrictions, there is no fly system.

Second Floor

The second floor contains mathematics, social studies, and English classrooms. The Media Center and counseling offices are also on the second floor. The "Black box", a small studio theater, was mostly paid for by alumnus Josh Hartnett. Friends of South High Theater raised the remaining money needed.

Third Floor

The third floor was constructed during the 1996–97 school year. It is the only floor with full windows. It houses science classrooms, world language classrooms, and many freshman classrooms.

Future Plans

In January of 2026, plans to renovate the building for a safer and more welcoming entrance as well as exterior improvements such as more natural lighting were approved. The goal of which was to improve student safety in addition to creating a more welcoming environment for students.

== Master Plan 1996 ==
In February 1996, as third-floor construction was underway, RSP Architects and Minneapolis Public Schools outlined the South High Master Plan, a vision for further improvements to the campus in ensuing years. The plan includes upgrades to the building structure, athletic fields, and acquisition of 31st Street between 19th and 20th Avenues.

== South High Programs/Small Learning Communities ==
In the 1980s, South High School Programs included the Open Program and the MAGNET Program, both designed as college preparatory programs.

In 2006, the Triple E (Environment, Empowerment, Essentials) program was eliminated, and students belonging to those SLCs were placed into the Open and Liberal Arts communities.

In 2023, the Open community was eliminated, and students belonging to this SLC were placed into the Liberal Arts community. There are also several programs for special education students and teenage parents. All South High School programs are designed to prepare students for post-secondary education options. Today, the school has two different Small Learning Communities (SLCs): Liberal Arts and All Nations American Indian.

Liberal Arts

This program offers students a broad array of subject areas. Each student is immersed in rigorous liberal arts courses.

All Nations American Indian (citywide)

The All Nations Program is designed to involve the American Indian community in student learning. The program incorporates courses with an emphasis on the Native perspective.

== Student body and academics ==
South has offerings in general education, special education, athletics, and world languages (French, Spanish, Arabic, Chinese, Ojibwe, and for many years Russian, German, and Latin. In 2012, Somali was added as a language class. The school is known for cultural diversity, with students from White, African-American, Asian (particularly Hmong), Horn African (particularly Somali and Oromo), American Indian, and Hispanic communities. There is an increasing number of Eastern European students.

While many academic programs at South are widely respected, the South student body also experiences a significant achievement gap. Students from wealthier and more educated families tend to be enrolled in Advanced Placement and College in the Schools classes and attend college after high school much more than other students. A similar discrepancy is discernible by ethnic background. In fact, a significant number of South students drop out of school before graduation. The state of Minnesota, to comply with the federal No Child Left Behind legislation, has given SHS two stars out of five in both reading and mathematics. This means that South failed to meet federal accountability standards in both categories in the preceding academic year.

The school received nationwide press in 2005 after it introduced online physical education classes. The program allows students to select a physical activity of their preference and engage in it three times a week to meet the school's P.E. requirements.

=== Events and organizations ===
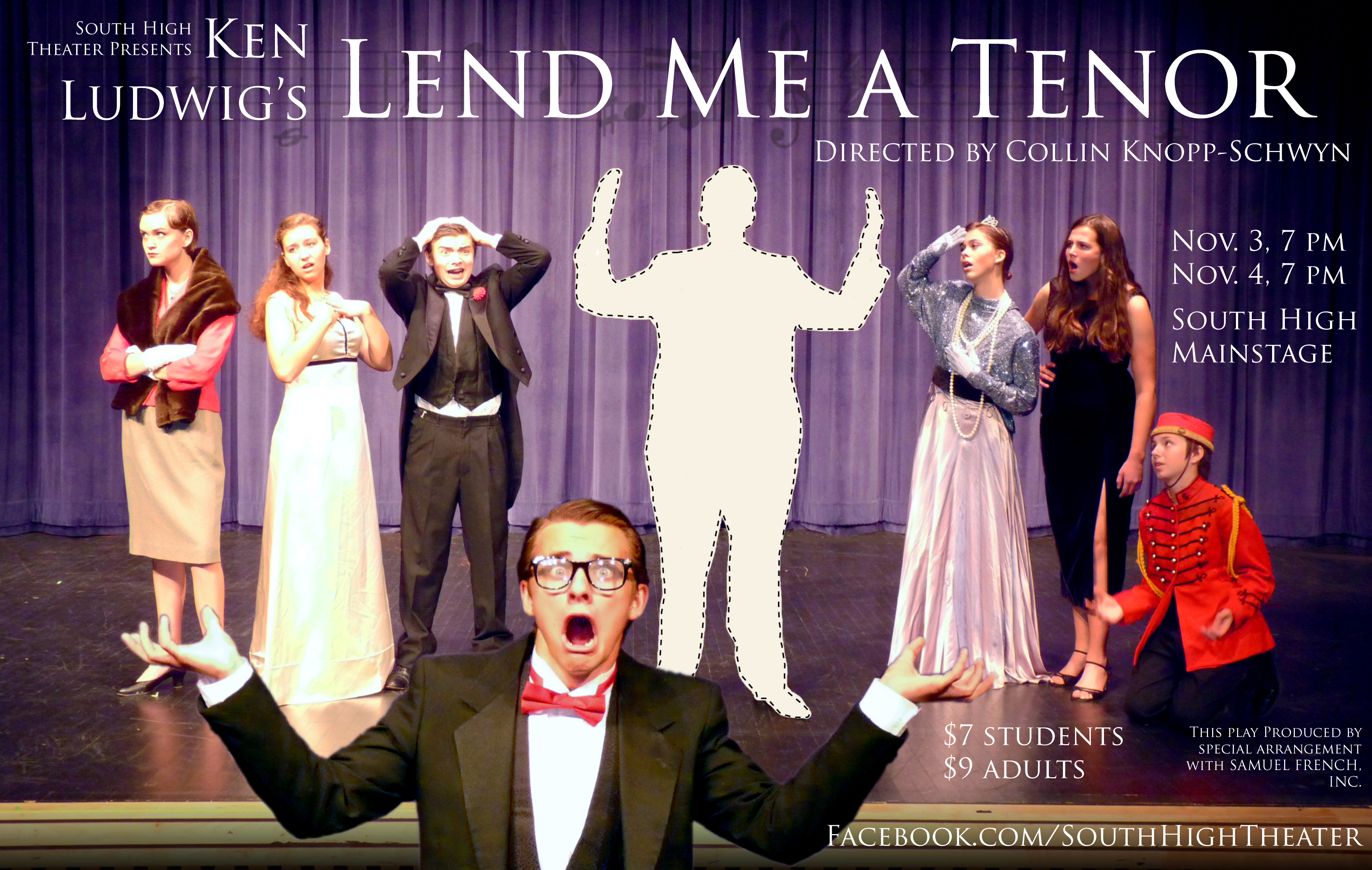
Poster for South's student-directed 2011 Mainstage production of Ken Ludwig's Lend Me a Tenor

Annual events include the open house, parent-teacher conference days, homecoming, athletic events, dances, and other social events. Many students arrive early or leave late to participate in extracurricular activities, including ethnic student associations, language clubs, competitive academic groups, mock trial, Academic Decathlon, Quiz Bowl, debate, and political groups. SHS has an active theater company. Some of its plays are student-directed, and many parts of the production encourage student involvement (for instance, students design and build the sets).

South High School also competes in national academic competitions. In 1998, its Mock Trial team was second in State, and in 1999 it was State Champion and nationally ranked. In 2005, students took fourth place in the nation in the Mock Trial competition, and in the 2006 national competition, South took 12th place. The South Mock Trial team stopped competing before the 2007 season. In 2005, South was ranked first in National History Day. In the spring and fall of 2021, South finished first in the MNVL State Minecraft Bedwars Championship.

== Athletics ==
South's girls basketball team rose to prominence in the last several years when Ahmil Jihad assumed the head coach position. The same year, Tayler Hill joined the team as an 8th grader. Hill won the state scoring title her sophomore and senior years and led South to a 139–14 record in her five-year career. After two consecutive Minnesota State High School League Class AAAA state championship losses to St. Paul Central, Minneapolis South got what they longed for by beating Centennial High School 68–61 in the 2009 class AAAA state final. Tayler Hill led all scorers, tying the all-time tournament record for most points in a single game with 47. Hill broke several Minnesota high school records in her senior season, including most career points with 3,894, most points in a single season with 1,053, and most free throw makes and attempts in a single season (270/350).

== Notable alumni ==
- Jacob "Prof" Anderson, rapper, formerly signed to Rhymesayers Entertainment
- Karl Anderson, Olympic track and field athlete
- Kelly Barnhill, Newbery Medal-winning author
- Michael Bland, drummer with Prince and Soul Asylum
- Gene Campbell, Olympic ice hockey player
- Alexei "Crescent Moon" Casselle, rapper and folk/blues musician with Oddjobs, Kill the Vultures, Roma di Luna, and other groups
- Rachael Leigh Cook, actor, known for She's All That and This Is Your Brain on Drugs
- Richard Cyert, president of Carnegie Mellon University
- Cully Dahlstrom, center for the Chicago Blackhawks
- Jason Daisy, retired professional basketball point guard
- Warren Douglas, actor and writer
- Robert Fitzgerald, Olympic speed skater
- Aisha Gomez, member of the Minnesota House of Representatives
- Genevieve Gorder, TV host of Dear Genevieve
- Abe Gray, cannabis activist and founder of Whakamana Cannabis Museum
- Emma Greenman, member of the Minnesota House of Representatives
- Lawrence R. Hafstad, physicist, cocreator of the first nuclear fission in the United States
- Carl G. Hagland, member of the Minnesota House of Representatives
- Josh Hartnett, actor, known for Pearl Harbor and 30 Days of Night
- Tayler Hill, guard for the Washington Mystics
- Isra Hirsi, activist
- Ike Holter, playwright
- José James, vocalist, known for blending jazz and hip hop styles
- Dewey Johnson, U.S. representative from Minnesota's 5th congressional district
- Randy Johnson, member of the Hennepin County Board of Commissioners
- Joseph M. Juran, quality management pioneer
- Jeremy Kalin, member of the Minnesota House of Representatives
- Malichansouk Kouanchao, visual artist, web and interactive designer
- Channy Leaneagh, vocalist with Poliça, Gayngs, and Roma di Luna
- Henning Linden, WWII brigadier general
- Carl Lumbly, actor known for Alias and Cagney and Lacey
- Lesley J. McNair, WWII general and namesake for Fort McNair, Washington, D.C.
- Hassan Mead, Olympic cross country runner
- Erin Meyer, author and business professor
- Tamara Munzner, data visualization expert, professor at the University of British Columbia
- Mally Nydahl, quarterback and halfback with the Minneapolis Red Jackets and Frankford Yellow Jackets
- Alex Pareene, editor-in-chief of Gawker
- Edith Marion Patch, entomologist and writer
- Bao Phi, spoken word artist
- John Pritchard, center for the Washington Generals
- Carl C. Rasmussen, member of the Los Angeles City Council
- Samantha Sencer-Mura, member of the Minnesota House of Representatives
- Hilda Simms, stage actor known for Anna Lucasta
- Elerson Smith, defensive end with the New York Giants
- Ossie Solem, football and basketball coach
- Max Specktor, activist
- Neva Walker, member of the Minnesota House of Representatives
- Winston Wallin, businessperson, CEO of Medtronic
- Don Wheeler, catcher for the Chicago White Sox
- Cathy Wurzer, journalist
- Luther Youngdahl, 27th governor of Minnesota and U.S. District Court judge
