= Carnelian (album) =

Studio album by Kill the Vultures
- Released: October 23, 2015
- Genres: Hip hop, alternative hip hop
- Length: 47:55
- Labels: Totally Gross National Product, F to I to X
- Producer: Anatomy

Kill the Vultures chronology
Ecce Beast (2009)	Carnelian (2015)

Carnelian is the fourth album by Minnesota hip hop group Kill the Vultures.

It was the group's first new album in six years. The album was released on October 23, 2015 by the Minnesota labels F | X and Totally Gross National Product. The album was particularly well-received in Europe, where it was named on a number of 2015 best-of-the-year lists.

== History ==
In an interview with Minneapolis alt-weekly City Pages, Casselle said that the album reflected his personal life, having gone through a divorce and raising a child since the previous Kill the Vultures record, 2009's Ecce Beast, as well as a commentary on the state of the world. Musically, the album features complex, jazz-inflected instrumentation including flute, sax, cello, piano, and gamelan. Rather than use traditional samples, Lewis composed the music himself, recorded it with session musicians, and remixed them into material for the album.

=== Singles ===
Before the album's release, the group put out the single "The Jackyl", which featured Channy Leaneagh of the alternative rock band Poliça, Casselle's ex-wife. On October 12, 2015, a music video for the song "Topsoil" was released on YouTube via F to I to X.

== Reception ==
Professional ratings
Review scores
Source	Rating
Il Mucchio	8/10 stars
Reviler	Favorable
Rift	Favorable
Scratched Vinyl	8/10 stars

The website Hip Hop Golden Age named Carnelian one of its 100 essential jazz rap albums, calling it "the epitome of (Kill the Vultures') innovativeness, with its ominous use of saxophones, trumpets, flutes, violins, cellos, guitars, double basses, and percussion. This is avant-garde jazz hop at its finest". Carnelian was also named No. 16 in a list of the top 20 Minnesota records of 2015 in the Star Tribune's survey of Twin Cities music critics. Reviewing the record for City Pages, Diane Miller called Carnelian the group's "most ambitious, bizarre, musical, and brilliant record to date," and that Casselle "raps of injustice, hypocrisy, and evil with conviction, imagination, and confounded relatability." Amoeba Music called Carnelian "essential hip hop listening."

The album was particularly well-received in Europe. English website The 405 praised Carnelian as "the most concise and rewarding album of (Kill the Vultures') career." London-based website The Monitors named Carnelian one of its top records of the year, calling it "adventurously jazzy" and saying that it was "probably the most musically exciting hip-hop album of 2015". Italian music magazine Blow Up called Carnelian " a very hard, dark album with a dense and heavy sound" and said that Kill the Vultures was "a group that still has a lot to say". Italian music website Il Mucchio rated the album 8 out of 10, named it Album of the Month for December 2015, and placed it on its year-end Best of 2015 list. It also made 2015 best-of-the-year lists for the French websites Trois Couleurs and Alternative Radio, Czech music blog Silver Rocket, Italy's Never Mind the Bee Stings, and German website Auftouren.

== Track listing ==
No.	Title	Length
1.	"Shake Your Bones"	3:03
2.	"Topsoil"	3:39
3.	"Broke"	3:34
4.	"The River"	4:54
5.	"Vandal"	2:51
6.	"God's Jewelry"	4:10
7.	"Coins On the Open Eyes"	4:00
8.	"Smoke In the Temple"	3:47
9.	"Simmer"	3:26
10.	"Don't Bring the Devil Out"	4:20
11.	"Crown"	3:24
12.	"Amnesia"	6:47

Vinyl bonus tracks
No.	Title	Length
13.	"The Jackal" (featuring Channy Leaneagh)	5:48

Notes

- "Amnesia" ends at 3:09 and contains the track "Last Time" after 0:25 seconds of silence.

== Personnel ==
Credits adapted from liner notes.

Kill the Vultures

- Anatomy - producer, recorded by
- Crescent Moon - vocals

Other musicians

- Adam Meckler - trumpet (7)
- Anil Partridge - violin (3)
- Channy Leaneagh - vocals (13)
- Chris Cunningham - guitar (11)
- deVon Gray - strings (3), piano (9)
- Graham O'Brien - bells (1), cymbal (1, 9, 10, 12, 13), floor tom (9), bass drum (10), tambourine (13)
- Jaqueline Ferrier-Ultan - cello (1, 3)
- Jeremy Ylvisaker - guitar (5, 6)
- Jon Davis - horns (1), bass (2–4, 7–9, 11–13), tenor saxophone (7, 8)
- Michelle Kinney - cello (3)
- Pete Whitman - soprano saxophone (8)
- Peter Pisano - guitar (2)
- Scott Agster - trombone (13)
- Tasha Baron - flute (2)

Technical personnel

- Adam Krinsky - mixed by
- Huntley Miller - mastered by
- Kai Benson - artwork, design
- Rob Oesterlin - additional recording (3, 8, 9, 13)
