= Carnelian (disambiguation) =

Carnelian is a reddish-brown variety of the mineral chalcedony.

Carnelian may also refer to:

- Carnelian (artist) (b. 1974), Japanese artist
- Carnelian (color), a shade of the color red
- Carnelian (grape), a variety of red wine grape
- Jherek Carnelian, a character in Dancers at the End of Time
- Carnelian, the main character in Ricardo Pinto's The Stone Dance of the Chameleon novel trilogy
- USS Carnelian (PY-19), a 1930 US warship during World War II
- Carnelian (album), the 2015 album from Minnesota hip hop group Kill the Vultures
