= Kill the Vultures =

American hip hop group

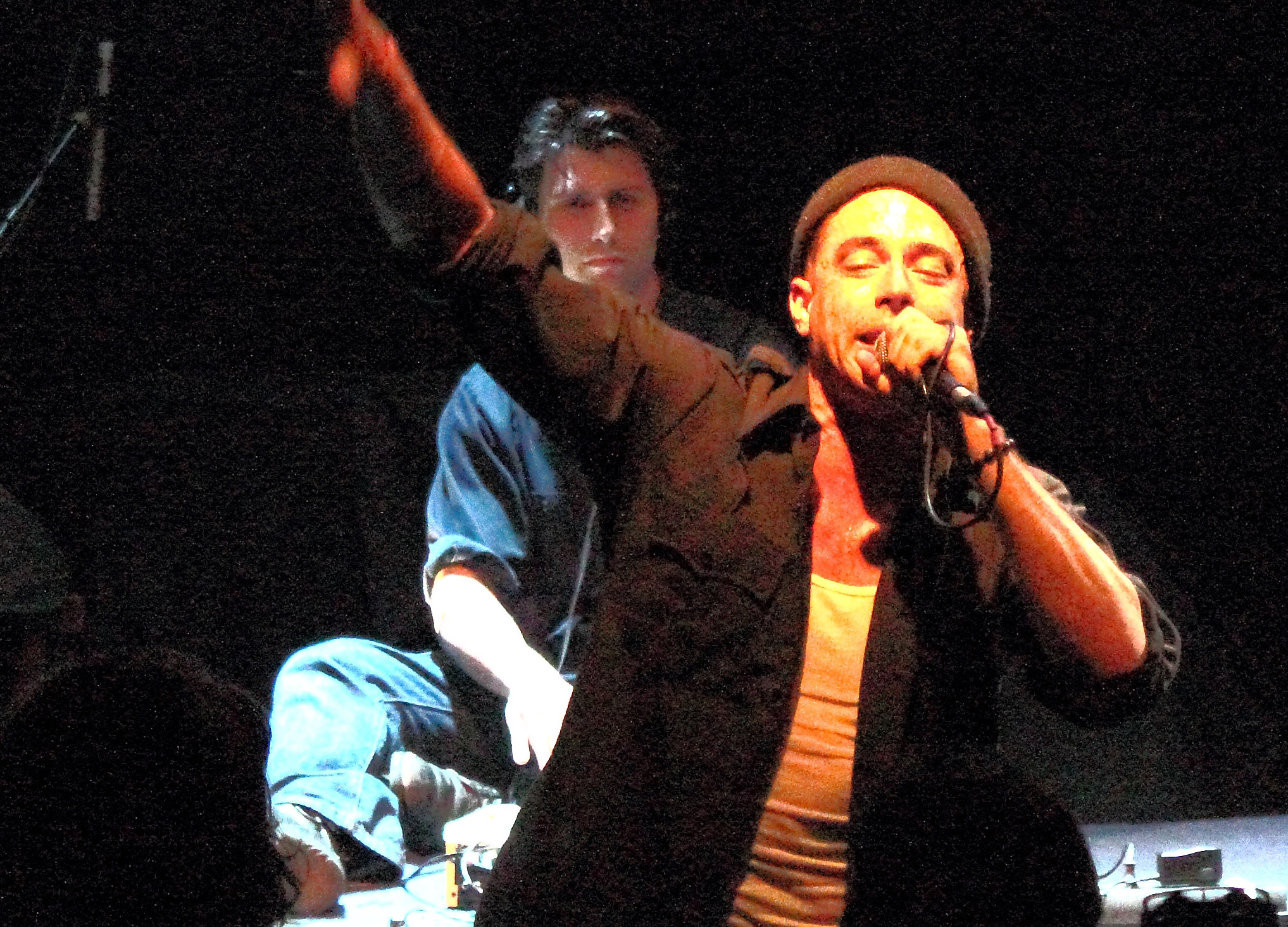
- Kill the Vultures performing in France in 2013

Background information
- Origin: Minneapolis, Minnesota, U.S.
- Genres: Hip hop, alternative hip hop
- Years active: 2005–present
- Labels: TGNP, Locust, F I X
- Spinoffs: Mixed Blood Majority, Roma di Luna
- Spinoff of: Oddjobs
- Members: Crescent Moon; Anatomy
- Past members: Advizer; Nomi
- Website: ftoitox.com

Kill the Vultures is an American hip hop group from Minneapolis, Minnesota formed in 2005.

A duo consisting of rapper Alexei "Crescent Moon" Casselle and producer Stephen "Anatomy" Lewis, the group was a spinoff of mid-2000s group Oddjobs. Kill the Vultures released a self-titled debut album in 2005 and other albums into the 2010s, most recently 2015's Carnelian. It was named 2005's Best Hip-Hop Artist by Minneapolis alt-weekly City Pages.

Building on the European success of Oddjobs, Kill The Vultures built a fanbase and positive critical attention from music critics in France, Italy, and other European countries. It was featured on the cover of the July–August 2005 issue of Italian music magazine Blow Up.

== History ==
Kill the Vultures was a marked divergence from Oddjobs. Both lyrics and sound were inspired by darker and moodier influences. The new direction came from a feeling that Oddjobs' focus on party music was becoming stale. "After a while, they (Oddjobs' songs) started to lose their meaning", Casselle said in an interview with Twin Cities Daily Planet. "It made us rethink our whole approach and what we were trying to do musically." Lewis told Chuck Terhark of City Pages, "I was more titillated by dark, psychedelic stuff" than what had driven Oddjobs. Star Tribune music critic Chris Riemenschneider called the band's sound "dark, freakish sonic territory that sounds like hip-hop sent through a metal shredder." Terhark described it as "innovative avant-rap that sounds a little like walking through a tool shed in the dark while carrying a boombox blaring free jazz."

=== 2005: Formation and self-titled debut ===
Kill the Vultures was a spinoff of Oddjobs, a hip-hop quintet formed by a group of friends from two Minneapolis high schools. Oddjobs (as well as Kill the Vultures later) were part of a regional hip-hop subculture based in the Twin Cities which developed in the mid-1990s and included Atmosphere and the Rhymesayers collective, Eyedea & Abilities, Doomtree, Heiruspecs, and Brother Ali.

The Oddjobs crew moved as a group to New York City and then California to improve their professional prospects in music. When Oddjobs broke up in 2005, four of the five members moved back to Minnesota beginning the new group Kill the Vultures. Anatomy (Lewis) and Crescent Moon (Casselle) were the core of the group, which briefly included Oddjobs rappers Advizer (Adam Waytz) and Nomi (Mario Demira). Over time, the fact that only Anatomy and Crescent Moon lived in Minneapolis led to the group winnowing down to a de facto duo. Waytz eventually moved to Chicago, where he became a neuropsychologist at Northwestern University. Demira returned to California, where he formed his own group, Power Struggle.

The group's name comes from a song written by Advizer for Oddjobs, which was later released on Kill the Vultures' debut album. Advizer told City Pages that the phrase referred to "people in your life who really benefit from bringing you down. 'Killing the vultures' is about preempting those demons."'

Casselle and Lewis were interested in moving away from Oddjobs' comparatively straightforward hip-hop into a darker, more avant-garde direction influenced by film noir and jazz. Casselle said in one interview that the change "wasn't really strategic—'You know what would be a really good idea? Let's start making really weird music that not a lot of people are into and challenging to listen to.' But I think really we just needed an outlet where we could completely express ourselves freely, artistically, and just do what we wanted to do." The new direction was acclaimed; Twin Cities Daily Planet writer Kyle Tran Myhre wrote, "Crescent Moon's rhymes are darkly poetic and evocative and Anatomy's beats are unlike anything else in the scene—cracked jazz samples, bone-crunching drums and some really dynamic arrangements."

The self-titled debut Kill the Vultures was released in 2005. In an early review of the album published in 2004 for CMJ New Music Monthly, Christopher Weingarten compared the album favorably to Tom Waits' Real Gone, calling it a "dark, brooding mess that clatters with the clanking toys stolen from the Bone Machine." Music website Oddboll called the album "hip hop for John Cage and free jazz fans." The A.V. Club named Kill The Vultures one of the best albums of 2005 from Minnesota, praising its "raw, experimental hip-hop" and the performances of the three MCs, especially the "intense, wild, biting delivery" of Crescent Moon. The album received positive critical attention in Europe, leading to concerts there and a substantial European following. In Minneapolis, Kill the Vultures was named 2005's Best Hip-Hop Artist in City Pages annual music poll. The group placed third in City Pages' annual "Picked To Click" band poll the same year.

=== 2006: The Careless Flame ===
Kill the Vultures' second album, The Careless Flame, was released in 2006 on the label Jib Door. By this time Lewis and Casselle were the only members of the band. Careless Flame continued the duo's interest in dark, noir-inflected hip-hop. At the time, Casselle was learning to play guitar and had formed a blues/folk duo, Roma di Luna, with his then-wife Channy Leanneagh. Casselle's interest in roots music can be heard on the song "Moonshine", which shows a clear blues influence: It features a repeating refrain in the style of traditional blues songs, and the lyrics are inspired by artists such as Tommy Johnson and Son House. The duo kept the simple arrangements used by traditional blues in mind, feeling they kept the impact of the songs undiluted. Steve McPherson of Twin Cities Daily Planet called it "a resolutely monolithic album... It's like two guys tried to recreate pop music after a nuclear war using only a book of beat poetry and a Duke Ellington 78 played at 33 rpms."

The album was critically well received. Neal Hayes of PopMatters called The Careless Flame "music that lurks in the dark corners of jazz, rock, and Asian music but calls the underground hip-hop scene its home." Reviewing The Careless Flame for The A.V. Club, Christopher Bahn wrote that the band's sound combined "elements of the raw holler of old-style Delta blues and the jagged clatter of New York's brash punk-jazz scene, with beats that boom like thunder and clank like metal dropped on a factory floor". French music critic Sylvain Bertot placed The Careless Flame 101st in his list of the 150 most important indie hip-hop albums. The album was also named No. 5 in a list of the top 10 Minnesota records of 2006 in the Star Tribune's annual survey of Twin Cities music critics. Reviewer Riemenschneider said that the album was "new and inventive" and that the duo was "hip-hop's answer to Fela Kuti and Sonic Youth."

=== 2007-2009: Midnight Pine and Ecce Beast ===
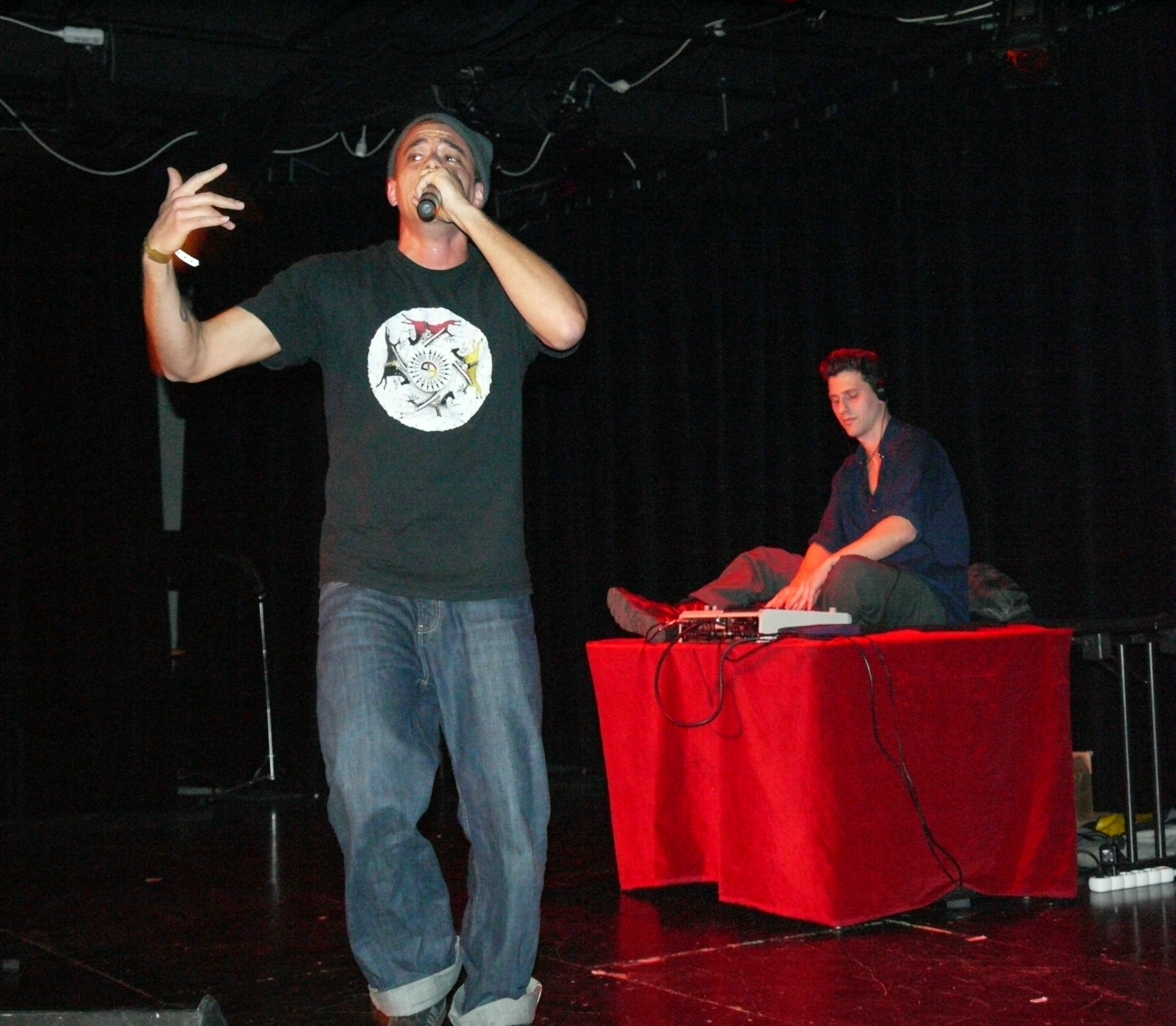
Minneapolis hip-hop duo Kill the Vultures performs in 2009

A short EP, Midnight Pine, was released by the group in 2007; it began as the soundtrack for an independent film. The group aimed for a quieter sound, avoiding ambient noise or electric guitar. Lewis told French music website PopNews that the move to a quieter sound reflected his own nocturnal habits: "I live at night. This explains why I spend a lot of time alone and quiet, which has made my music more meditative and nocturnal. Midnight Pine reflects this." French rap website Hiphopcore called Midnight Pine "much more peaceful and subdued" than the "ubiquitous musical chaos" of Careless Flame; it said that Anatomy's jazz-inspired beats seemed "calmer than usual to dress up the dark, almost whispered stories of Crescent Moon in the most beautiful way."

Kill The Vultures' third full-length album, Ecce Beast, was released in 2009. An album about urban alienation as seen through the eyes of a man driven to commit murder, Ecce Beast was more down-tempo and cinematic in approach than earlier work. The title plays off of the Latin phrase "ecce homo," meaning "behold the man," and refers to the protagonist's feelings of rage and self-negativity—thus, "behold the beast." Star Tribune critic Chris Riemenschneider called Ecce Beast "loaded with KTV's signature brand of nocturnal, gritty, experimental hip-hop." Amoeba Music noted that Ecce Beast's "noisy jazz instrumentals don't always make for easy listening" but called the album rewarding and challenging "like a drinking session between a poet and a jazz band gone right." French website Chroniques Electroniques wrote that "the ghost of the great Sun Ra hovers continuously over this album, giving it real depth. The multiple instruments used and the many strange sounds appearing out of nowhere are enough to demonstrate the enormous craftsmanship of Anatomy behind each title."

=== 2010s: Carnelian and other projects ===
In 2015, Kill the Vultures returned with Carnelian, the duo's first album in six years. The album was released by the Minnesota labels F | X and Totally Gross National Product. In a City Pages interview, Casselle said that the album reflected his personal life, having gone through a divorce and raising a child since the previous Kill the Vultures record, as well as a commentary on the state of the world. Musically, the album features complex, jazz-inflected instrumentation including flute, sax, cello, piano, and gamelan. Rather than use traditional samples, Lewis composed the music, recorded it with session musicians, and remixed them into songs for the album. The website Hip Hop Golden Age named Carnelian one of its 100 essential jazz rap albums, calling it "the epitome of (Kill the Vultures') innovativeness, with its ominous use of saxophones, trumpets, flutes, violins, cellos, guitars, double basses, and percussion. This is avant-garde jazz hop at its finest". Carnelian was named No. 16 in a list of the top 20 Minnesota records of 2015 in the Star Tribune's survey of Twin Cities music critics. Reviewing the record for City Pages, Diane Miller said Carnelian was the group's "most ambitious, bizarre, musical, and brilliant record to date" and that Casselle "raps of injustice, hypocrisy, and evil with conviction, imagination, and confounded relatability." Amoeba Music called Carnelian "essential hip hop listening."

The album was particularly well-received in Europe. The 405, an English website, praised Carnelian as "the most concise and rewarding album of (Kill the Vultures') career." The Monitors, a website from London, said that Carnelian was one of its top records of the year calling it "adventurously jazzy". It said the recording was "probably the most musically exciting hip-hop album of 2015". Italian music magazine Blow Up called Carnelian " a very hard, dark album with a dense and heavy sound" and said that Kill the Vultures was "a group that still has a lot to say". Il Mucchio, an Italian website, rated the album 8 out of 10, named it the Album of the Month for December 2015, and put it on its year-end Best of 2015 list. It also made 2015 best-of-the-year lists for the French websites Trois Couleurs and Alternative Radio, Czech music blog Silver Rocket, Italy's Never Mind the Bee Stings, and German website Auftouren.

In 2018, Kill the Vultures earned a McKnight Fellowship for Musicians from the MacPhail Center for Music in Minneapolis. The award recognizes musical artists who have demonstrated a consistent level of excellence over their careers.

In 2021, the duo performed with Italian avant-jazz collective Ghost Horse at the South Tyrol Jazz Festival northeast of Milan in Bolzano, Italy.

== Related projects ==
Around 2004, Casselle formed a folk duo called Roma di Luna with his wife Channy Leaneagh, who later sang with synth-pop group Poliça. His interest in folk music was ignited when he became a fan of Bob Dylan, which inspired him to teach himself how to play guitar, as well as gaining an interest in the blues. Leaneagh, who grew up listening to folk and Americana music, was classically trained on violin. For a few years, Casselle worked simultaneously with both Kill the Vultures and Roma di Luna. What began as a duo of him and his wife evolved into a larger group of seven, which recorded three studio albums—Find Your Way Home (2007), Casting the Bones (2008), and Then The Morning Came (2010)—as well as the Christmas EP Christmas (2010). Casselle and Leanneagh divorced in 2011, which ended Roma di Luna. Roma di Luna reunited in 2017 and released a fourth album, We Were Made To Forgive, in 2018.

Casselle formed another hip-hop group, Mixed Blood Majority, with fellow Minneapolis musicians Lazerbeak of Doomtree and Joe Horton of No Bird Sing. The group has shared stages with well known artists like Sage Francis, P.O.S, Aceyalone, and Slick Rick. The group released two albums, 2013's Mixed Blood Majority and 2015's Insane World. Casselle also fronted a rap/rock group backed by Minneapolis instrumental band Big Trouble named Crescent Moon Is in Big Trouble.

In 2012, Casselle traveled to France to collaborate with Oktopus from Dälek, a hip-hop group from New Jersey, French musician Jean-Michel Pires, and English musician Chris Cole in the electronic-influenced group Numbers Not Names, which released one EP, What's The Price? in 2012 on the French label Ici D'Ailleurs.

Casselle continues to perform music but also became a teacher in the 2010s after Roma di Luna's breakup.

== Members ==
=== Current ===
- Crescent Moon (Alexei Casselle) - rapper
- Anatomy (Stephen Lewis) - producer/DJ

=== Former ===
- Advizer (Adam Waytz) - rapper
- Nomi (Mario Demira) - rapper

== Discography ==
=== Albums and EPs ===
- Kill the Vultures (Jib Door, 2005)
- The Careless Flame (Jib Door, 2006)
- Midnight Pine EP (Self-released, 2007)
- Ecce Beast (Self-released, 2009)
- Carnelian (Totally Gross National Product, F to I to X, 2015)

=== Singles ===
- "Moonshine" (Jib Door, 2006)
- "The Jackal" (F to I to X, 2015)
