= Digitata =

Digitata may refer to:

- digitate, divided into finger-like lobes, in Latin
- Digitata (band), a band from Minneapolis, Minnesota, United States
