= The Careless Flame =

Studio album by Kill the Vultures
- Released: October 24, 2006
- Genre: Alternative hip hop
- Length: 30:58
- Label: Jib Door

Kill the Vultures chronology
Kill the Vultures (2005)	The Careless Flame (2006)	Midnight Pine (2007)

The Careless Flame is the second album by Minnesota alternative hip hop group Kill the Vultures. It was released in 2006 by Jib Door.

French music critic Sylvain Bertot placed The Careless Flame 101st in his list of the 150 most important indie hip-hop albums.

== History ==
Rapper Alexei "Crescent Moon" Casselle and producer Stephen "Anatomy" Lewis, who had spun off Kill the Vultures as a quartet from their earlier hip-hop group Oddjobs, were by this point the sole remaining members of the band.

Careless Flame continued Kill the Vultures' interest in dark, noir-inflected hip-hop. At the time, Casselle was learning to play guitar and had formed a blues/folk duo, Roma di Luna, with his then-wife Channy Leanneagh. This immersion in roots music led to a blues influence on The Careless Flame. The song "Moonshine" uses a repeating refrain in the style of traditional blues songs, and is lyrically inspired by artists like Tommy Johnson and Son House. The duo kept the simple arrangements used by traditional blues in mind, feeling that they kept the impact of the songs undiluted. Steve McPherson of Twin Cities Daily Planet called it "a resolutely monolithic album. ... It's like two guys tried to recreate pop music after a nuclear war using only a book of beat poetry and a Duke Ellington 78 played at 33 rpms."

== Reception ==
The Careless Flame
Review scores
Source	Rating
The A.V. Club	A−
PopMatters	7/10 stars
Fake For Real	(positive)

The album was critically well received. Neal Hayes of PopMatters called The Careless Flame "music that lurks in the dark corners of jazz, rock, and Asian music but calls the underground hip-hop scene its home." Reviewing The Careless Flame for The A.V. Club, Christopher Bahn wrote that the band's sound combined "elements of the raw holler of old-style Delta blues and the jagged clatter of New York's brash punk-jazz scene, with beats that boom like thunder and clank like metal dropped on a factory floor".

The album was also named No. 5 in a list of the top 10 Minnesota records of 2006 in the Star Tribune's survey of Twin Cities music critics. Reviewer Chris Riemenschneider praised the album as "new and inventive" and called the duo "hip-hop's answer to Fela Kuti and Sonic Youth."

French website Fake For Real said that The Careless Flame "bears the mark of great albums," and singled out the song "Moonshine" in particular, calling it "the ultimate blues of the new century, a drunkard's lament, a background of fatalism, of decline, underlined by a simple bass line, slow and intermittent percussion and a tired saxophone."

A negative review of the album by the zine Roctober consisted of one word: "Why?"

== Track listing ==
No.	Title	Length
1.	"Moonshine"	4:01
2.	"Dirty Hands"	3:18
3.	"The Spider's Eyes" (Flute – Tasha Baron)	3:30
4.	"Days Turn Into Nights"	2:58
5.	"Strangers In The Doorways"	4:19
6.	"Birchwood"	3:12
7.	"The Wine Thief"	2:35
8.	"Vermillion"	3:25
9.	"How Far Can A Dead Man Walk" (Saxophone – Sean Behling)	3:40

== Credits ==
- Mastered by Dave Gardner
- Mixed by Mike Whitney
- "Dity Hands" contains flute elements from collected Syrian folk songs played by Tasha Baron, 1943
- "How Far Can A Dead Man Walk" contains saxophone elements from Sean Behling's live improvisations at the Ohio Jazz Festival, 1974
- Cover art by Scott Brown
