= Gayngs =

American indie band

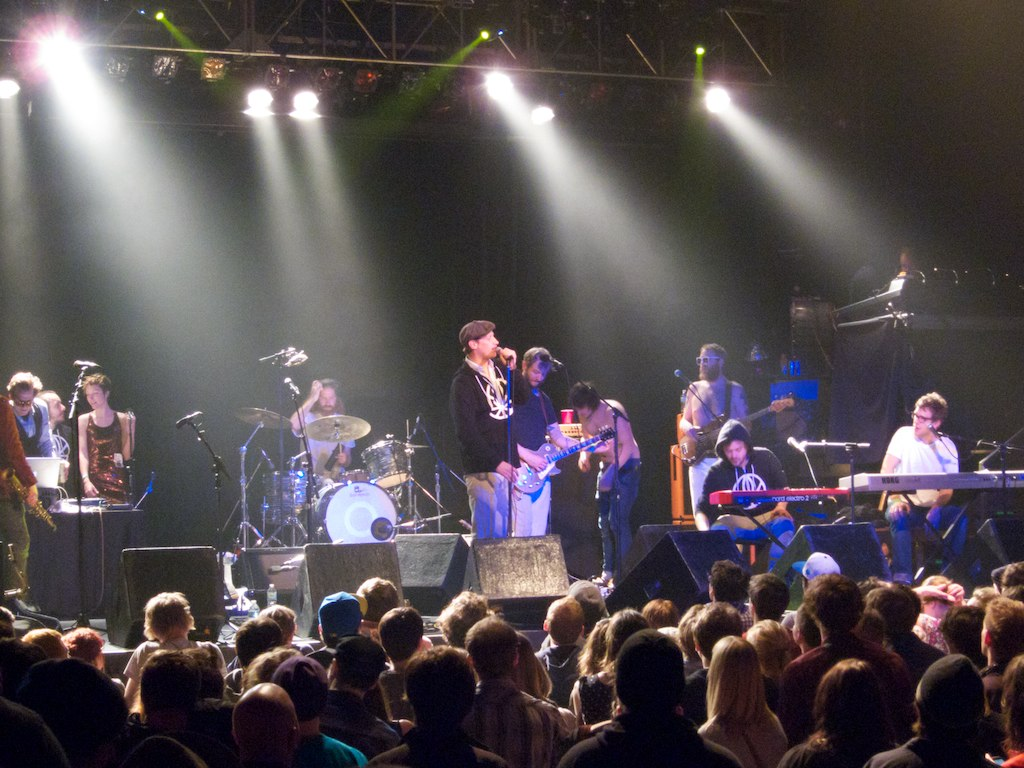
- Approximately half of Gayngs touring for the release of Affiliyated onstage at First Avenue in Minneapolis in 2011

Background information
- Origin: Minneapolis, Minnesota; Eau Claire, Wisconsin
- Genres: Indie rock; soft rock; alternative hip-hop
- Years active: 2010–present
- Label: Jagjaguwar
- Members: Ryan Olson; Justin Vernon; Mike Noyce; Har Mar Superstar; Dessa; P.O.S; Channy Leaneagh; Michael Lewis; Ivan Howard; Joe Westerlund; Brad Cook; Phil Cook; Zack Coulter; Adam Hurlburt; Shön Troth; Maggie Morrison; Grant Cutler; James Buckley; Jake Luck; Nick Ryan; Katy Morley; Danny Krzykowski
- Website: www.gayngs.net

Gayngs is a Midwest indie band with a 1980s soft rock-inspired sound. Founded by Ryan Olson, the group consists of 22 musicians, including Justin Vernon of Bon Iver, Dessa and P.O.S of Doomtree, Har Mar Superstar and members of Poliça, Megafaun, Roma di Luna, Solid Gold, Digitata, and The Rosebuds.

== History ==
Their first album, Relayted, was released by Jagjaguwar and garnered positive reviews for its unique vocal stylings and retro-but-contemporary sound. It has been described as walking the "line between schmaltz and sincerity, between parody and earnestness." The songs, inspired by 10cc's "I'm Not In Love", were written at 69 BPM and recorded over the course of a year. The Guardian called the album "a triumph" and listed it as "the album of the year". The A.V. Club gave the album B+.

In May 2010, Gayngs staged a prom-themed release party for their song "The Last Prom on Earth" at First Avenue in Minneapolis. Prince watched the show from the side stage.

The band played a ten-show tour in September and October 2010, scheduled to culminate with a performance at Austin City Limits. However, due to a misunderstanding with the rental company providing their tour bus, their equipment was taken back to Nashville in the early morning of October 10, 2010. This forced them to cancel what Justin Vernon referred to as "possibly our last show ever." On October 4, they were featured as the musical guests on Late Night with Jimmy Fallon. On April 15, 2011 the band played a late-night set in the Mojave Tent on the opening night of Coachella.

On March 4, 2011 Doomtree released a free 7-track remix EP, entitled Affiliyated. Among the artists involved were Cecil Otter, Sims, Paper Tiger, Mike Mictlan, P.O.S, and Lazerbeak.

Their songs "The Gaudy Side of Town" and "The Walker" were featured on the soundtrack album for the 2012 film The Comedy, starring Tim Heidecker.

On May 14, 2020, after over nine years of silence, the band released the single "Appeayl 2 U" via Bandcamp.

== Members ==
- Ryan Olson (Marijuana Deathsquads, Poliça)
- Justin Vernon, Mike Noyce (Bon Iver)
- Har Mar Superstar
- Dessa, P.O.S (Doomtree)
- Channy Leaneagh (Poliça, Roma di Luna)
- Michael Lewis (Happy Apple)
- Ivan Howard (The Rosebuds)
- Joe Westerlund, Brad Cook, Phil Cook (Megafaun)
- Zack Coulter, Adam Hurlburt, Shön Troth (Solid Gold)
- Maggie Morrison (Digitata, Lookbook)
- Grant Cutler (Lookbook)
- James Buckley (Mystery Palace, Ponch and the Vandals)
- Jake Luck, Nick Ryan (Leisure Birds, Thunder In The Valley)
- Katy Morley
- Danny Krzykowski

== Discography ==
=== Studio albums ===
- Relayted (2010)

=== Remix EPs ===
- Affiliyated (2011)

=== Remixes ===
- Blonde Redhead – "Here Sometimes" (2011)
