= Carl G. Hagland =

American tradesman and politician

Carl G. Hagman (December 24, 1898 – May 22, 1974) was an American tradesman and politician.

Hagland was born in Minneapolis, Minnesota, and graduated from South High School in Minneapolis. He also went to the University of Minnesota Law School. Hagland lived with his wife in Minneapolis. He was a tile layer and was involved with the Minneapolis Building Trades Council. Hagland served in the Minnesota House of Representatives from 1935 to 1940 and from 1943 to 1960. He died in Minneapolis, Minnesota and the funeral and burial was in Minneapolis, Minnesota.
