= United Crushers =

Studio album by Poliça
- Released: March 4, 2016
- Genres: Synth-pop, indietronica, art pop, alt-pop
- Length: 43:02
- Label: Mom + Pop Music
- Producer: Ryan Olson

Poliça chronology
Shulamith (2013)	United Crushers (2016)

Professional ratings
Aggregate scores
Source	Rating
Metacritic	72/100
Review scores
Source	Rating
AllMusic	4/5 stars
The A.V. Club	B+
Consequence of Sound	C−
The Guardian	4/5 stars
Pitchfork	6.6/10

United Crushers is the third studio album by Poliça. It was released by Mom + Pop Music on March 4, 2016. It is a follow-up to their 2013 album, Shulamith. It was recorded with producer Ryan Olson at the Sonic Ranch studios in El Paso, Texas. The album was named after the Minneapolis based graffiti artists by the same name.

== Critical reception ==
At Metacritic, which assigns a weighted average score out of 100 to reviews from mainstream critics, United Crushers received an average score of 72% based on 19 reviews, indicating "generally favorable reviews".

== Track listing ==
No.	Title	Length
1.	"Summer Please"	3:56
2.	"Lime Habit"	3:34
3.	"Someway"	3:30
4.	"Wedding"	3:26
5.	"Melting Block"	2:58
6.	"Top Coat"	3:57
7.	"Lately"	3:09
8.	"Fish"	3:10
9.	"Berlin"	3:50
10.	"Baby Sucks"	3:08
11.	"Kind"	4:46
12.	"Lose You"	3:41

== Charts ==
Chart	Peak position
Heatseekers Albums	5
Independent Albums	22
Top Rock Albums	44
