= Shulamith (album) =

Studio album by Poliça
- Released: October 18, 2013
- Genre: Indietronica, art pop, alt-pop
- Length: 50:54
- Label: Mom + Pop
- Producer: Ryan Olson, Poliça

Poliça chronology
Give You the Ghost (2012)	Shulamith (2013)	United Crushers (2016)

Deluxe edition cover

Singles from Shulamith
- 1. "Tiff" Released: April 15, 2013; 2. "Chain My Name" Released: October 18, 2013 (Australia)

Professional ratings
Aggregate scores
Source	Rating
Metacritic	73/100
Review scores
Source	Rating
AllMusic	4/5 stars
Drowned in Sound	7/10
Entertainment Weekly	B+
The Guardian	3/5 stars
NME	7/10
Pitchfork	7.5/10
Rolling Stone	3/5 stars
Slant Magazine	3.5/5 stars

Shulamith is the second studio album by American indie pop band Poliça, released on October 18, 2013 by Mom + Pop Music.

== Background and development ==
The album title refers to the radical feminist Shulamith Firestone whose book The Dialectic of Sex was the main inspiration to singer and lyricist Channy Leaneagh after the recording of the album. Describing Firestone as "This woman to me is like my pop star. I want to try and be more like her," Leaneagh insisted that the name wasn't chosen "because I wanted to make a statement about feminism." At the same time, themes explored in the album dovetail with feminist concerns such as the conflict of desire and frustration that attend living up to cultural ideals as well as the pitfalls of materialism and perfectionism.

"Tiff" was released as the album's lead single on April 15, 2013. An expanded/deluxe edition of the album was released on 10 June 2014. The edition contained four new tracks by the band; include "Raw Exit", which the band demoed a little after the release of their debut, Give You the Ghost. The track was never officially released but the band played at concerts. These four tracks were also made available in the form of Raw Exit EP, Leaneagh stated in their blog: "'Raw Exit' still sounds like Poliça but goes to a different place topically than the rest of Shulamith—it's about wanting someone, which is rare in our songs." The EP was also released as a 10" vinyl record.

== Album cover ==
The cover of the album features a bust-length view of a young Caucasian woman against a royal blue background and turned away from the spectator at a 45 degree angle. Her long brown hair appears wet and is wrapped around the left side of her neck to expose the right side that is stained with a deep red liquid. The red substance stains her right ear and hairline as well as parts of her upper back. The ambiguity of the image - is it blood or hair dye? - played a role in its censorship on iTunes, among other music retailers. When asked about the censorship, Leneagh replied in this way:

"It's a very violent society that we live in, so I was confused when the image on our cover was censored. You look on iTunes and there's some really violent-sounding music. My music isn't really that, I don't have anything specifically violent about my music. That cover was exploring the life of a woman that's a mix of blood and beauty and the brutal existence of a woman. A lot of the covers on iTunes are just a face of the singer. Not like everybody has to have a message on their record cover, but it just infuriates me that iTunes is dumbing down the opportunity for musicians to have a voice."

== Track listing ==
All lyrics are written by Channy Leaneagh; all music is composed by Ryan Olson.

Shulamith track listing
No.	Title	Length
1.	"Chain My Name"	4:07
2.	"Smug"	3:59
3.	"Vegas"	4:11
4.	"Warrior Lord"	4:30
5.	"Very Cruel"	4:45
6.	"Torre"	4:27
7.	"Trippin"	4:15
8.	"Tiff" (featuring Justin Vernon)	4:26
9.	"Spilling Lines"	3:02
10.	"Matty"	4:58
11.	"I Need $"	4:38
12.	"So Leave"	3:36
Total length:		55:35

Shulamith expanded edition
No.	Title	Length
13.	"Raw Exit"	4:15
14.	"Baby Blue"	3:30
15.	"Great Regret"	2:18
16.	"You Don't Own Me"	3:16
Total length:		61:35

== Personnel ==
Credits adapted from the liner notes of Shulamith.

Poliça

- Poliça – production
- Channy Leaneagh – vocals
- Chris Bierden – bass, harmony vocals
- Drew Christopherson – drums
- Ben Ivascu – drums
- Ryan Olson – beats programming, production, synth

Additional personnel

- BJ Burton – engineering, mixing
- Isaac Gale – back photography, cover
- Michael Gaughan – watercolor painting
- Andrea Hyde – design
- Huntley Miller – mastering

== Charts ==
Chart performance for Shulamith
Chart (2013)	Peak position
Australian Hitseekers Albums (ARIA)	10
Belgian Albums (Ultratop Flanders)	47
Belgian Albums (Ultratop Wallonia)	69
French Albums (SNEP)	141
Irish Albums (IRMA)	93
Irish Independent Albums (IRMA)	14
Swiss Albums (Schweizer Hitparade)	85
UK Albums (OCC)	33
UK Independent Albums (OCC)	4
US Heatseekers Albums (Billboard)	1

== Release history ==
Release history and formats for Shulamith
Region	Date	Format	Label
Australia	October 18, 2013	CD, LP, digital download	Pod
Germany	October 18, 2013	CD, LP	Memphis Industries
Germany	October 20, 2013	Digital download	Memphis Industries
France	October 21, 2013	CD, LP, digital download	Memphis Industries
United Kingdom	October 21, 2013	CD, LP, digital download	Memphis Industries
United States	October 22, 2013	CD, LP, digital download	Mom + Pop Music
