= Digitata (band) =

American electronic rock band

- Origin: Minneapolis, Minnesota, United States
- Genre: Electronic rock
- Years active: 2004-present
- Label: Totally Gross National Product
- Members: Maggie Morrison; Ryan Olson; Drew Christopherson
- Website: Totally Gross National Product

Digitata is an electronic rock band from Minneapolis, Minnesota. The band has released three albums on independent record label Totally Gross National Product.

Digitata consists of Maggie Morrison on vocals, Ryan Olson on sequencer and Drew Christopherson on drums. Maggie Morrison is also a member of Gayngs and Lookbook. In 2010, City Pages praised her as "Best Female Vocalist" of the year. Olson and Christopherson are also part of the group Mel Gibson and the Pants.

URB described Digitata's music as "quirky and synth heavy with futuristic programming full of laptop tricks and emotionally captivating vocals." The band's style has been compared to as Morcheeba, Portishead, and Massive Attack.

== Discography ==
=== Albums ===
- Sexually Transmitted Emotions (2005)
- II Daggers (2007)
- Art Work Pays (2009)
