= Kill the Vultures (album) =

Studio album by Kill the Vultures
- Released: April 19, 2005
- Genre: Alternative hip hop
- Length: 31:45
- Label: Jib Door

Kill the Vultures chronology
Kill the Vultures (2005)	The Careless Flame (2006)

Kill the Vultures is the debut album by Minnesota alternative hip hop group Kill the Vultures. It was released in 2005 by Jib Door.

Kill the Vultures was a spinoff of hip-hop quintet Oddjobs, consisting of four of its five members who had moved home to Minnesota from California after Oddjobs' breakup. Taking a new artistic direction from Oddjobs' more mainstream rap sound, Kill the Vultures pursued riskier material influenced by film noir and jazz.

== Reception ==
Kill the Vultures
Review scores
Source	Rating
CMJ New Music Monthly	Favorable
Fake For Real	(positive)

Christopher Weingarten of CMJ New Music Monthly compared the album favorably to Tom Waits' Real Gone, calling it a "dark, brooding mess that clatters with the clanking toys stolen from the Bone Machine." Music website Oddboll called the album "hip hop for John Cage and free jazz fans."

The A.V. Club named Kill The Vultures one of the best Minnesota-made albums of 2005, praising its "raw, experimental hip-hop" and the performances of the three MCs, especially the "intense, wild, biting delivery" of Crescent Moon.

The album received positive critical attention in Europe, leading to a string of concerts across the continent and a steady European following. French website Fake For Real wrote positively about Kill the Vultures, calling it "urgent and accusatory hardcore rap" that serves as "a denunciation of our industrial and mechanical society. ... a series of devastating sax volleys, dismembered pianos and relentless percussion, and punk is never far away."

In its hometown, Kill the Vultures was named 2005's Best Hip-Hop Artist in Minneapolis alt-weekly City Pages' annual music poll. The group also placed third in City Pages annual "Picked To Click" band poll the same year.

== Track listing ==
No.	Title	Length
1.	"Lovin' You Dangerous"	3:28
2.	"Hidden Signals"	1:56
3.	"The Vultures"	3:11
4.	"7/8/09"	3:07
5.	"Good Intentions"	4:50
6.	"Sick Days Are Upon Us"	3:35
7.	"Beasts Of Burden"	5:10
8.	"Howl N' Heal"	2:12
9.	"Behind These Eyes"	3:58

== Credits ==
- Lyrics by Advizer, Crescent Moon, Nomi
- Mastered by Dave Gardner
- Mixed by Mike Whitney
- Producer: DJ Anatomy
