= Relayted =

Studio album by Gayngs
- Released: May 11, 2010
- Genre: Indie rock; soft rock
- Length: 55:00
- Label: Jagjaguwar
- Producer: Ryan Olson

Gayngs chronology
Relayted (2010)	Affiliyated (2011)

Relayted is the first studio album by Minneapolis indie rock collective Gayngs. It was released via Jagjaguwar on May 11, 2010. Inspired by 10cc's "I'm Not in Love", every song on the album was recorded at 69 BPM. On May 14, 2010, the album release show was held at First Avenue. The album peaked at number 27 on Billboard's Heatseekers Albums chart. As of 2011, it has sold 13,000 copies.

== Critical reception ==
Professional ratings
Aggregate scores
Source	Rating
Metacritic	78/100
Review scores
Source	Rating
AllMusic	3.5/5 stars
The A.V. Club	B+
BBC Music	favorable
The Guardian	5/5 stars
MusicOMH	4.5/5 stars
NME	9/10
Pitchfork	6.5/10
PopMatters	7/10 stars
The Skinny	4/5 stars

At Metacritic, which assigns a weighted average score out of 100 to reviews from mainstream critics, Relayted received an average score of 78, based on 13 reviews, indicating "generally favorable reviews".

Steven Hyden of The A.V. Club gave the album a grade of B+, calling it "a record fueled by the soft-rock solipsism of 10cc and loads of antidepressants." Barry Nicolson of The Skinny gave the album 4 stars out of 5, saying: "Dipping its toe in everything from soft-rock to hip-hop to R&B and sixties soul, the songs all manage the trick of sounding roughly the same, completely unique, and uniformly superb."

NME placed Relayted at number 13 on the "75 Best Albums of 2010" list. Pitchfork placed "The Gaudy Side of Town" at number 99 on the "Top 100 Tracks of 2010" list.

== Track listing ==
No.	Title	Length
1.	"The Gaudy Side of Town"	7:07
2.	"The Walker"	4:50
3.	"Cry" (Godley & Creme)	5:22
4.	"No Sweat"	6:05
5.	"False Bottom"	2:54
6.	"The Beatdown"	3:00
7.	"Crystal Rope"	3:24
8.	"Spanish Platinum"	4:22
9.	"Faded High"	7:28
10.	"Ride"	3:49
11.	"The Last Prom on Earth"	6:33

== Personnel ==
Credits adapted from liner notes.

- Justin Vernon – vocals (1, 2, 3, 4, 6, 7, 8, 9, 11), guitar (1, 2, 3, 4, 8, 9), Rhodes piano (8), mixing
- Zach Coulter – human beatbox (1), vocals (1, 3, 7, 10), keyboards (1, 4, 11), piano (4), guitar (6)
- Michael Lewis – saxophone (1, 2, 4, 5, 8, 11)
- Phil Cook – electric piano (1), vocals (3), guitar (3), keyboards (4, 6, 7, 9, 10, 11)
- Brad Cook – bass guitar (1, 7, 9, 11)
- James Buckley – phone call (1), organ (5), bass guitar (11)
- Joe Westerlund – drums (1, 2, 3, 4, 5, 6, 7, 8, 9, 10, 11), vocals (8)
- Ivan Howard – vocals (2, 9, 11), piano (6)
- Nick Ryan – guitar (2, 8)
- Shön Troth – slide guitar (2, 6, 7)
- Jake Luck – keyboards (2, 7, 9), organ (4), trumpet (5)
- Nate Vernon – gun (2)
- Amish Kids – chainsaw (2)
- Danny Krzykowski – guitar (3)
- Grant Cutler – vocals (3)
- Maggie Morrison – vocals (3, 9, 11), electric piano (10)
- Adam Hurlbert – bass guitar (4, 6, 7, 8, 9, 10, 11), keyboards (5)
- Xander – piano (4)
- Channy Moon Casselle – vocals (4, 6, 9)
- Maggie Wander – vocals (4, 9)
- LeRon – vocals (4)
- Joe Mabbott – vocals (5)
- Mike Noyce – vocals (6, 9)
- Katy Morley – vocals (9)
- Ryan Olson – bass guitar (7, 11), programming, sequencing, arrangement
- Bruce Templeton – mastering
- Michael Gaughan – painting
- Eric Carlson – logo
- Daniel Murphy – layout

== Charts ==
Chart	Peak position
US Heatseekers Albums (Billboard)	27
