= Midnight Pine =

EP by Kill the Vultures
- Released: 2007
- Genre: Alternative hip hop

Kill the Vultures chronology
The Careless Flame (2006)	Midnight Pine (2007)	Ecce Beast (2009)

Midnight Pine is an EP by Minnesota alternative hip hop group Kill the Vultures. It was self-released by the band in 2007.

== History ==
Midnight Pine began as the soundtrack for an independent film. The group aimed for a quieter sound than the previous disc The Careless Flame, avoiding ambient noise or electric guitar. DJ Stephen "Anatomy" Lewis told Paris-based website PopNews that the move to a quieter sound reflected his own nocturnal habits: "I live at night. This explains why I spend a lot of time alone and quiet, which has made my music more meditative and nocturnal. Midnight Pine reflects this."

== Reception ==
French rap website Hiphopcore called Midnight Pine "much more peaceful and subdued" than the " ubiquitous musical chaos" of Careless Flame, and said that Anatomy's jazz-inspired beats seemed "calmer than usual to dress up the dark, almost whispered stories of Crescent Moon in the most beautiful way."

== Track listing ==
No.	Title	Length
1.	"Where the Cutthroats Stay"	3:13
2.	"A Long Way Down"	4:00
3.	"Midnight Pine"	3:49
4.	"Can't Buy Forgiveness"	2:53
5.	"Cemetery Stroll"	3:19
6.	"A Long Way Down (Part II)"	2:13

== Credits ==
Personnel:

- Alexei "Crescent Moon" Casselle
- Stephen "Anatomy" Lewis
