= Give You the Ghost =

Studio album by Poliça
- Released: February 14, 2012
- Genre: Indie pop
- Length: 45:39
- Label: Totally Gross National Product
- Producer: Ryan Olson

Poliça chronology
Give You the Ghost (2012)	Shulamith (2013)

Give You the Ghost is the debut studio album by American indie pop band Poliça. It was released by Totally Gross National Product on February 14, 2012. It was re-released by Mom + Pop Music together with a remix EP on August 14, 2012. It peaked at number 15 on the Billboard Heatseekers Albums chart.

== Production ==
"Wandering Star" and "Lay Your Cards Out" feature vocals by Mike Noyce from Bon Iver. On the use of vocal effects, Leaneagh explained that "I'm not using Autotune to correct my voice, I'm using it to distort it, to catch the notes in between the melody line". Much of the lyrical content centered around the breakdown of Leaneagh's first marriage.

== Critical reception ==
Professional ratings
Aggregate scores
Source	Rating
Metacritic	77/100
Review scores
Source	Rating
AllMusic	3.5/5 stars
BBC	favorable
Consequence of Sound	3.5/5 stars
Drowned in Sound	9/10
The Guardian	3/5 stars
Pitchfork	7.6/10
PopMatters	7/10 stars
Rolling Stone	3.5/5 stars

At Metacritic, which assigns a weighted average score out of 100 to reviews from mainstream critics, the album received an average score of 77, based on 19 reviews, indicating "generally favorable reviews".

Andrew Flanagan of Rolling Stone gave the album 3.5 out of 5 stars, commenting that Leaneagh's "focused, tender voice cascades over dense fields of minor key electronics, backed by funked-up bass and a swarm of percussion." He added, "It's the sound of heartbreak and celebration happening simultaneously." Harley Brown of Consequence of Sound stated that "the post-prog-rock percussion and mellifluous bass, along with Channy Leanagh's Auto-Tuned swan songs, re-shape the intersection of rhythm and blues."

The album was placed at number 40 on NME's "50 Best Albums of 2012" list, as well as number 24 on Clash's "Top 40 Albums of 2012" list.

== Track listing ==
All lyrics are written by Channy Leaneagh; all music is composed by Ryan Olson.

No.	Title	Length
1.	"Amongster"	3:59
2.	"I See My Mother"	4:26
3.	"Violent Games"	4:12
4.	"Dark Star"	5:01
5.	"Form"	3:40
6.	"The Maker"	4:19
7.	"Lay Your Cards Out"	4:04
8.	"Fist, Teeth, Money"	3:19
9.	"Happy Be Fine"	4:39
10.	"Wandering Star"	5:04
11.	"Leading to Death"	2:56

== Charts ==
Chart	Peak position
Belgian Albums (Ultratop Flanders)	47
Belgian Albums (Ultratop Wallonia)	62
US Heatseekers Albums (Billboard)	15
