= Affiliyated =

EP by Gayngs
- Released: March 4, 2011
- Genre: Alternative hip-hop
- Length: 26:25
- Label: Doomtree Records
- Producers: Cecil Otter; MK Larada; Paper Tiger; Plain Ole Bill; P.O.S; Lazerbeak

Gayngs chronology
Relayted (2010)	Affiliyated (2011)

Affiliyated is a remix EP of Gayngs' 2010 debut studio album, Relayted, by Doomtree. It premiered on Stereogum on March 4, 2011. The EP was produced by Cecil Otter, Paper Tiger, P.O.S, and Lazerbeak, among others. The producers were handed 10 random stems from Relayted to build a new song out of them. The EP's release show was held at First Avenue on March 6, 2011.

== Track listing ==
No.	Title	Length
1.	"Fight, Fuck, Fall Asleep (Cecil Otter Regrind)" (featuring Sims)	2:05
2.	"Coercion Van (MK Larada Regrind)"	5:57
3.	"Cologne & Water (Paper Tiger Regrind)"	2:12
4.	"Draper Drunk (Plain Ole Bill Regrind)" (featuring Mike Mictlan and The Chocolate Ox)	3:15
5.	"No Scrubs (P.O.S Regrind)"	3:36
6.	"Sprinkle Juice (Lazerbeak Regrind)"	4:38
7.	"Sand in the Lotion (Cecil Otter Regrind)"	4:46
Total length:		26:25

== Personnel ==
Credits adapted from liner notes.

- Gayngs – music
- Cecil Otter – remix (1, 7)
- Sims – guest appearance (1)
- MK Larada – remix (2)
- Paper Tiger – remix (3)
- Plain Ole Bill – remix (4), turntables
- Mike Mictlan – guest appearance (4)
- The Chocolate Ox – guest appearance (4)
- P.O.S – remix (5)
- Lazerbeak – remix (6)
- The Cook Brothers – keyboards
