= Winston Wallin =

American businessman and philanthropist

Winston Roger Wallin (6 March 1926 – 20 December 2010) was an American businessman and philanthropist. He served as chairman and chief executive officer of Medtronic from 1985-1991 and as President and Chief Operating Officer of Pillsbury from 1977 to 1985. He also formed, along with his wife Maxine, the Wallin Foundation, later known as Wallin Education Partners.

== Early life ==
A 1943 graduate of Minneapolis South High School, Wallin served two years in the U.S. Navy Air Corps and enrolled in the University of Minnesota to major in business administration when he returned. While there, he met and subsequently married Maxine Wallin née Houghton.

== Career ==
After college, Wallin started his career as regional grain buyer for Pillsbury in 1948. Wallin rose through the ranks of Pillsbury, eventually becoming president and chief operating officer responsible for the company's agribusiness operations, restaurant businesses including Burger King and Steak and Ale restaurants.

In 1985, Wallin was named chairman and CEO of Medtronic. Despite Medtronic's troubles at the time, revenue increased by $1 billion during his tenure. He retired as CEO of the medical device maker six years later, naming Bill George as his successor and turning his attention to philanthropy.

== Philanthropy ==
In 1991, Wallin and his wife formed the Wallin foundation, later Wallin Education Partners, which gives financial aid and advice to promising Minnesota public school students from low-income families to attend college. As of 2017, Wallin Education Partners had aided 4,400-plus college students through nearly $50 million in scholarships and critical guidance services.

In 2010, the University of Minnesota named its new medical biosciences building, a key facility in the school’s $292 million Biomedical Discovery District, after Wallin and his wife Maxine in recognition of their lifelong patronage of the school.
