= Totally Gross National Product =

Independent record label from Minneapolis

- Founded: 2004
- Founder: Ryan Olson; Drew Christopherson
- Country of origin: U.S.
- Location: Minneapolis, Minnesota
- Official website: tgnp.bandcamp.com

Totally Gross National Product (abbreviated TGNP) is an American independent record label based in Minneapolis, Minnesota.

A musician-run collective, the label was founded by Ryan Olson and Drew Christopherson, who played in a number of Twin Cities bands including Poliça, Gayngs, and Marijuana Deathsquads. It is best known for issuing the debut records of Lizzo (Lizzobangers) and Poliça (Give You the Ghost), as well as other Twin Cities bands including Marijuana Deathsquads, Kill the Vultures, Fog, Digitata, and Solid Gold.

The label was known for its cross-pollination between the musicians on its roster, who would frequently play in two or three TGNP-related bands. Christopherson told an interviewer that the label “was always meant to be an umbrella that we would channel our projects and projects we loved through,” and described the label's philosophy as "genre-less." Star Tribune music critic Chris Riemenschneider praised the label's approach as "awash in impressive electronic soundscapes and jagged sonic experimentation."

The label released a 10-track compilation album, Totally Gross National Product 2013 Sampler, in 2013.

In 2014, TGNP was named Best Local Record Label in City Pages's "Best of the Twin Cities" poll.

== Roster ==
- Albert
- Alpha Consumer
- Bloodeath
- Building Better Bombs
- The Cloak Ox
- Digitata
- Fog
- Jason Feathers
- Jeremy Ylvisaker
- JM Airis
- JT Bates
- Kill the Vultures
- Leisure Birds
- Lewis
- Lizzo
- Makr
- Marijuana Deathsquads
- Mel Gibson and the Pants
- Moonstone Continuum
- Motioner
- Mystery Palace
- Nicholas L. Perez
- Poliça
- Pony Bwoy
- Roniia
- Solid Gold
- Spyder Baybie Raw Dog & 2% Muck
- Stolyette
- Taggart & Rosewood
- Tender Meat
- Umami
- Votel

== See also ==
- List of record labels
