= Mally Nydahl =

American athlete and surgeon (1906–1979)

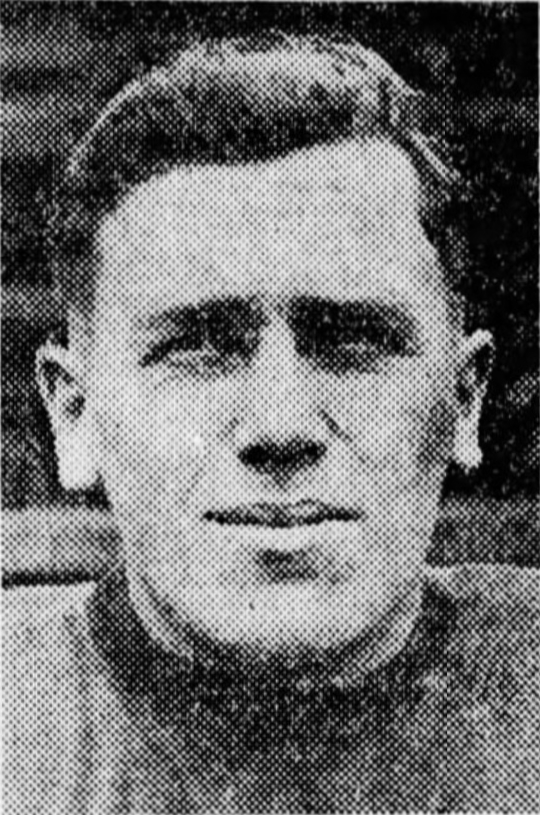
- Nydahl in a 1927 Minneapolis Star photograph

Profile
- Position: Back

Personal information
- Born: November 24, 1906; Minneapolis, Minnesota, US
- Died: May 27, 1979 (aged 72); Hennepin County, Minnesota, US
- Listed height: 5 ft 11 in (1.80 m)
- Listed weight: 163 lb (74 kg)

Career information
- High school: South (MN)
- College: Minnesota

Career history
- Minneapolis Red Jackets (1929–1930); Frankford Yellow Jackets (1930–1931)

Malvyn John "Mally" Nydahl, sometimes spelled Nydall (November 24, 1906 – May 27, 1979), was an American football, baseball, and basketball player and orthopedic surgeon. He played college football for Minnesota and in the National Football League (NFL) for the Minneapolis Red Jackets (1929–1930) and Frankford Yellow Jackets (1930–1931).

== Early years and college ==
Nydahl was born in 1906 in Minneapolis, Minnesota. He attended South High School in Minneapolis.

He attended the University of Minnesota and played for the Golden Gophers football team from 1925 to 1928. In 1926, he scored a game-winning touchdown against Wisconsin on a 67-yard run. He called the play "the greatest thrill of my athletic career". Grantland Rice rated Nydahl as "one of the greatest backs ever to come out of the Middle West".

He was also captain of Minnesota's basketball (as a running guard) and baseball (as a center fielder) teams, received eight varsity letters, and participated in 107 intercollegiate games (20 football, 48 basketball, and 39 baseball).

== Professional sports ==
Nydahl played minor league baseball for several years after graduating from Minnesota, including stints with the Davenport Blue Sox (1929, 1931), Denver Bears (1932), Omaha Packers (1933), Oklahoma City Indians (1933), and Elmira Red Wings (1933). He had his best season with Denver in 1932, batting .366 with 231 hits, 48 extra-base hits and a .481 slugging percentage.

He also played for the independent Christian Lindsay basketball team in 1928.

Nydahl also played professional football for the Minneapolis Red Jackets during the 1929 and 1930 seasons. He played at the halfback and quarterback positions. He also played for the Frankford Yellow Jackets in 1930. He appeared in 27 NFL games, 19 as a starter, scored four touchdowns, and kicked three extra points.

== Later life ==
Nydahl used his earnings as a professional football player to put himself through medical school. He received his M.D. in 1934. He later became a professor of orthopedic surgery at the University of Minnesota. He was also chief of orthopedic surgery at Hennepin County General Hospital. He died in 1979 at age 72.
