= Ecce Beast =

Studio album by Kill the Vultures
- Released: 2009
- Genre: Alternative hip hop

Kill the Vultures chronology
Midnight Pine (2007)	Ecce Beast (2009)	Carnelian (2015)

Ecce Beast is the third album by Minnesota alternative hip hop group Kill the Vultures. It was self-released by the band in 2009.

An album about urban alienation as seen through the eyes of a man driven to commit murder, Ecce Beast was more down-tempo and cinematic in approach than earlier work. The title plays off of the Latin phrase "ecce homo," meaning "behold the man," and refers to the protagonist's feelings of rage and self-negativity—thus, "behold the beast."

== Reception ==
Ecce Beast
Review scores
Source	Rating
Chroniques Electroniques	7/10 stars

Star Tribune critic Chris Riemenschneider called Ecce Beast "loaded with KTV's signature brand of nocturnal, gritty, experimental hip-hop." Amoeba Music noted that Ecce Beast's "noisy jazz instrumentals don’t always make for easy listening" but called the album rewarding and challenging "like a drinking session between a poet and a jazz band gone right."
