= Solid Gold (band) =

- Origin: Madison, Wisconsin, US
- Genres: Electronic, R&B
- Years active: 2002–present
- Label: Totally Gross National Product
- Members: Zack Coulter; Adam Hurlburt; Matt Locher
- Past members: Jesse Cohen; Shon Troth; Adam Peterson; Paulie Heenan
- Website: solidgoldband.com

Solid Gold is a Minneapolis-based indie rock band with an electronic and R&B sound. It consists of Zach Coulter, Adam Hurlburt and Matthew Locher. Solid Gold was voted "Best Rock Band of 2011" by the City Pages Readers' Poll.

== History ==
In 2002, Solid Gold released their first EP, Solid Gold, followed by a second EP, Out of Your Mind, in 2004. In 2005, the band moved from Madison, Wisconsin to Minneapolis, Minnesota.

In 2008, the group released their first studio album, Bodies of Water. The MTV review of Bodies of Water stated: "[the album] drew comparisons to everything from new wave bands like New Order to ’80s Manchester bands like Happy Mondays and Stone Roses. The lyrics are deliciously obtuse, puzzle pieces of expression that could be fit into multiple meanings, rewarding multiple listens.” NME said of the LP: "This totally, totally addictive piece of laid-back, twinkling Minneapolis funkiness, has us mercilessly hooked."

In 2012, the band released their second studio album, Eat Your Young.

== Style and influences ==
Paul Lester of The Guardian said: "They make downbeat dance music, sad synth-pop, melancholy club tracks, which might sound like a contradiction in terms but not to those of you who have, over the past 25 years, appreciated artists from Pet Shop Boys to Junior Boys." Lester also drew comparisons to Empire of the Sun and OMD.

MTV Iggy said of Solid Gold: "the overall tenor of remembrance and loss belies the disco superficiality of the band's name. But don’t just judge this band by their recordings. What feels reserved and melancholy on the album gets forgotten when they’re live — taking over the stage, ripping their guitars to shreds, turning the amps up to 11."

== Members ==
=== Current ===
- Zack Coulter - vocals
- Matt Locher - keyboards, guitar
- Adam Hurlburt - guitar, bass

=== Past ===
- Jesse Cohen - drums
- Shon Troth - slide guitar
- Adam Peterson - drums
- Paulie Heenan - guitar

== Discography ==
=== Studio albums ===
- Bodies of Water (2008)
- Eat Your Young (2012)

=== EPs ===
- Solid Gold (2002)
- Out of Your Mind (2004)
- Who You Gonna Run To? (2008)
- Synchronize (2010)

=== Singles ===
- "Bible Thumper" (2008)
- "Matter of Time" (2009)
- "Fat Lip" (2009)
- "Get Over It" (2009)
- "Take Me Out to the Ballgame" (2010)
- "Love You To" (2011)
- "Towns" (2019)
- "Believe Me" (2020)
