= Poliça =

American synth-pop band

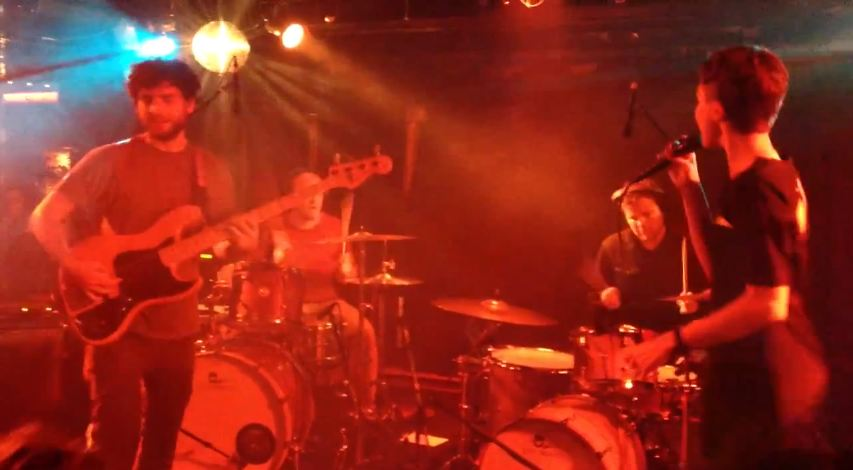
- Poliça in 2012

Background information
- Origin: Minneapolis, Minnesota, U.S.
- Genres: Art pop; synth-pop; indietronica; indie pop; trip hop; alt-pop; electropop
- Years active: 2011–present
- Labels: Totally Gross National Product; Memphis Industries; Inertia; Mom + Pop Music; Transgressive
- Spinoff of: Roma di Luna, Gayngs
- Members: Channy Leaneagh; Chris Bierden; Ben Ivascu; Drew Christopherson; Ryan Olson
- Website: thisispolica.com

Poliça (often stylised in all caps) is an American pop band from Minneapolis, Minnesota, formed in 2011. The band consists of Channy Leaneagh (vocals, synth), Chris Bierden (bass), Drew Christopherson (drums) and Ben Ivascu (drums), with Ryan Olson joining the band in a studio context as its producer.

To date, the band has released seven studio albums, Give You the Ghost (2012), Shulamith (2013), and United Crushers (2016) through Mom + Pop Music; Music For the Long Emergency (2018) through Transgressive; When We Stay Alive (2020) and Madness (2022) through Memphis Industries. In July 2025, they announced their seventh studio album, Dreams Go, which was released in October 2025. They also tour internationally.

== Naming ==
According to Channy Leaneagh, Poliça is Polish for "policy", and she sees it as a reference to an unwritten code that guides the members when they play together, as well as its work ethic.

The Polish word is spelled polisa (from Italian polizza) and literally means an insurance agreement or insurance certificate. However, it may colloquially refer to an unofficial back up or contingency plan which could include an unwritten agreement and code of conduct.

In another interview, Leaneagh said that they wanted something unique, and she had a file on her computer which, following a corruption during a computer crash, had come back as "Poliça".

== History ==
=== Origins ===
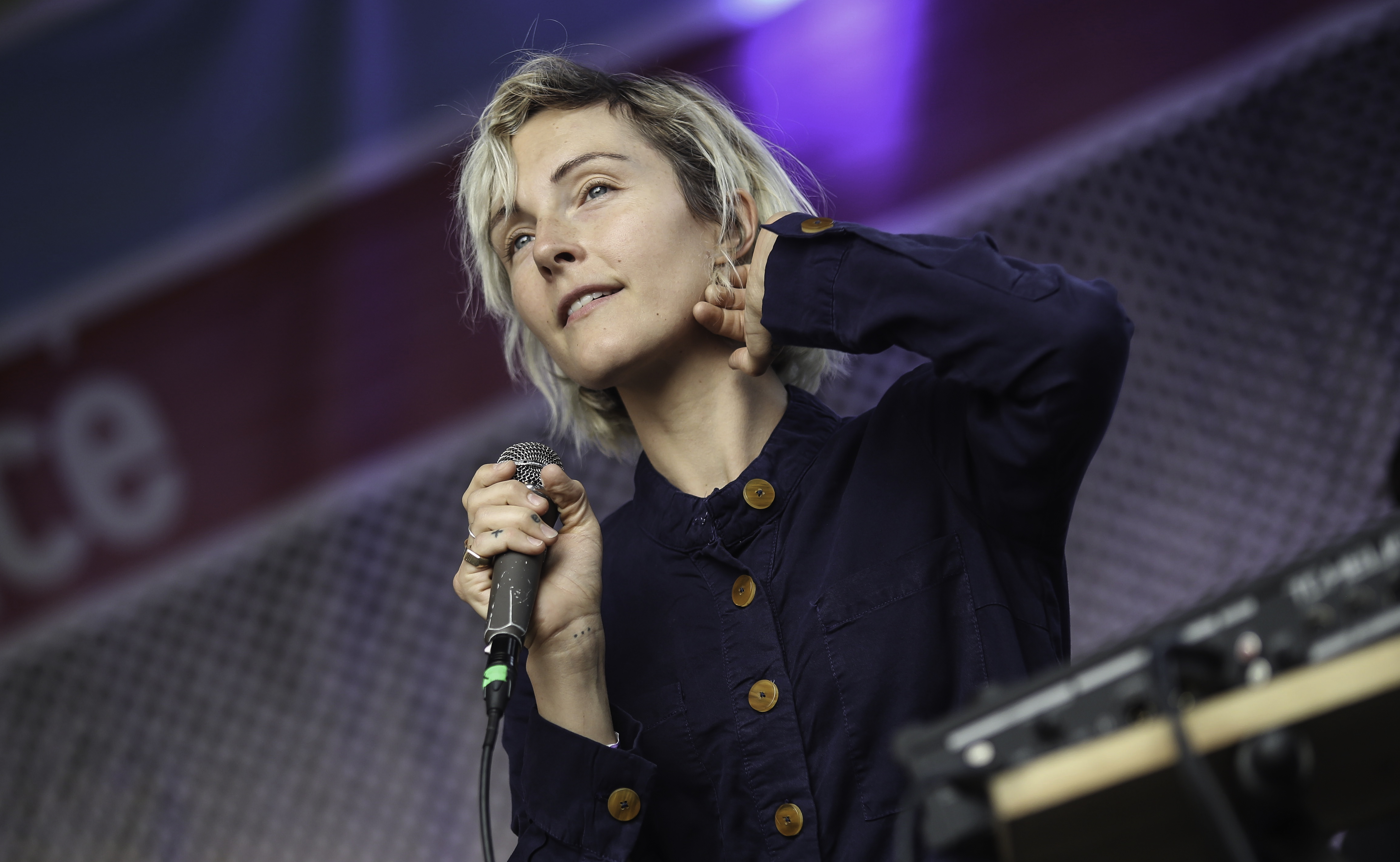
Leaneagh in 2018

From a musical family, Leaneagh attended the Ramsey Fine Arts school, where she learned to dance, play violin and participated in theater. She graduated from Minneapolis South High School where she met Alexei Casselle and formed an acoustic folk-rock duo, Roma di Luna. Casselle, who was primarily a hip-hop performer in the groups Oddjobs and Kill the Vultures, sent Leaneagh tapes of his acoustic songs while she was in Cambodia teaching art for a year. In June 2005, Leaneagh and Casselle were married. Roma di Luna released three albums, on which Leaneagh sung and played violin. In November 2008, Leaneagh gave birth to a daughter, Pelagia.

After a marital and professional break-up, the singer was looking for a "creative release" that eventually became Poliça. The origins of the band were found in Ryan Olson's Gayngs project, where Leaneagh featured as a backing singer. After working together on some musical and lyrical ideas, Olson convinced Leaneagh to record the songs over the summer of 2011 with an R&B sound. Experimenting with various vocal effects, the duo drafted in Chris Bierden (bass/vocals), Drew Christopherson (drums) and Ben Ivascu (drums) to complete the sessions that also featured a guest-appearance by Mike Noyce (Bon Iver). Olson declined to be part of a live set-up and Bierden, Christopherson and Ivascu together with Leaneagh became the Poliça touring outfit. They made their live-debut on September 4, 2011, at the Minneapolis restaurant and club Nick and Eddie, and made two songs, "Dark Star" and "Lay Your Cards Out (feat. Mike Noyce)", available on their website. For the rest of the year, the band toured, partly as support to Clap Your Hands Say Yeah. The band also received support from Bon Iver founder Justin Vernon who told Rolling Stone, "They're the best band I've ever heard."

=== Give You the Ghost ===
Their debut, Give You the Ghost, was released on Valentine's Day, 2012 on Totally Gross National Product, a local community-based label, founded by drummer Drew Christopherson and Ryan Olson. The main reason to self-finance was 'to put the record out' as soon as possible'. In March 2012, the band played at SXSW in Austin, Texas, where NPR wrote that 'Where Give You the Ghost gives the suggestion of a subdued live presence, Polica's stage show heads to somewhere approaching the opposite extreme — a welcome jolt of beauty and power.' During a Polica live performance Leaneagh uses effect pedals to stylize and manipulate her voice.

The summer of 2012 saw the band tour parts of Europe and play a handful of festivals together with Bon Iver. In August 2012, it was announced that the band had signed with Mom + Pop records and re-released the album on the 14th of that month, together with a remix EP. In October, they cancelled an appearance at the Iceland Airwaves music festival for an appearance on Later... with Jools Holland in a 16-date UK/European tour.

=== Shulamith ===
In the first half of 2013, Olson and Leaneagh began working on new music, described by the singer as 'Drums. Bass. Synths. Me, Women'. Much of this was done by e-mail as the band continued to tour and Olson was spending time in Brazil. Much of the actual recording was completed at the April Base studios of Bon Iver in Wisconsin. Their second album, Shulamith was released on October 20, 2013, and preceded by the single 'Tiff' featuring Justin Vernon. Both the video for "Tiff" and the artwork of the album were described as "brutal".

As part of the promotional mix, the band played BBC2's Later... with Jools Holland on October 11, 2013, and, three days later, on BBC Radio 6 Music's Lauren Laverne show from Maida Vale Studios in London. The title of the album is a reference to the feminist Shulamith Firestone, who Leaneagh described as her "muse and mentor". In contrast to the previous album, the singer "had more time with each song this time, but the lyrics and melodies are still based on that first reaction". Leaneagh was also among the "friends" that contributed to The Flaming Lips' "The Time Has Come to Shoot You Down… What a Sound," a reworking of the Stone Roses debut album out Black Friday 2013.

In June 2014 the band released the Raw Exit EP that consisted of four outtakes from the Shulamith sessions. The four songs included three originals and one cover of "You Don't Own Me". It was also included in the expanded version of the album that was released simultaneously and supported by a North American club tour and festival dates in Europe.

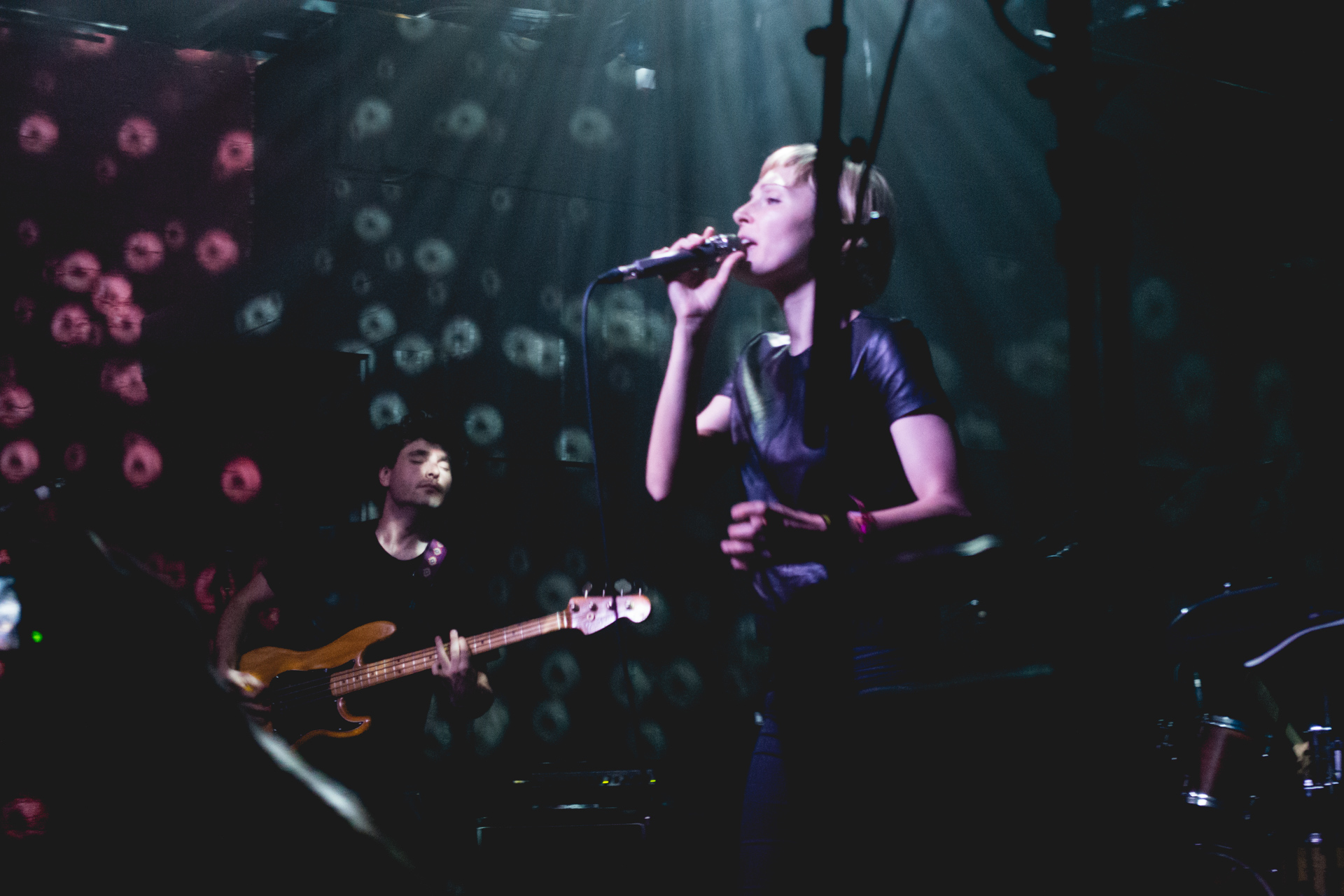
Poliça appearing at SXSW 2016

=== United Crushers ===
Leaneagh began writing material in 2013 and continued to do so between tours. The material was completed in the first half of 2015 and the band began rehearsals in preparation of recording. At the start of April, they embarked on a nine-date tour to perform the new songs. The second half of the month was used to record the album at the Sonic Ranch residential studio in Texas. In 2015 Leaneagh and Olson got married and had a son in October of the same year.

The band released their third album, United Crushers, on March 4, 2016. Again produced by Ryan Olson the track "Lime Habit" was released online in November 2015. The album was recorded over 10 days in El Paso. Leaneagh described it as "I saw this record as my last chance [and] wanted it to have a 'final paper' feel."

=== Music for the Long Emergency ===
Poliça teamed up with Stargaze, a Berlin-based orchestral collective, to develop the new album, Music for the Long Emergency which was released on February 16, 2018, on Transgressive Records. The two groups first met in February 2016 in Berlin during the Liquid Music project hosted by the St. Paul Chamber Orchestra, and first worked together on Bruise Blood: Reimagining Steve Reich's 'Music for Pieces of Wood'. The two groups worked for 18 months on the new album. The first single is a ten-minute song, "How Is This Happening", which Leaneagh wrote on the day after the 2016 U.S. presidential election. They released a short film to accompany the song in May 2018.

=== When We Stay Alive ===
On October 9, 2019, the band announced that their fifth studio album, When We Stay Alive, would be released on January 31, 2020.

=== Madness ===
In April 2022, the band announced that their sixth studio album, Madness, would be released on June 3, 2022.

=== Dreams Go ===
In July 2025, Poliça announced that their seventh studio album, Dreams Go, would be released on October 13, 2025.

=== Better Live ===
On February 26, 2026, Poliça released their eighth album, Better Live, written and recorded live during February's three-week residency at Icehouse in Minneapolis, MN.

== Discography ==
=== Albums ===
List of albums, with selected chart positions
Title	Year	Peak positions									
Title	Year	US	AUS Hit.	BEL (Fl)	BEL (Wa)	FRA	GER	IRE	SCO	SWI	UK
Give You the Ghost	2012	—	—	47	62	—	—	—	—	—	86
Shulamith	2013	115	10	47	69	141	—	93	55	85	33
United Crushers	2016	—	—	52	178	—	88	—	84	—	72
Music for the Long Emergency (with Stargaze)	2018	—	—	—	—	—	—	—	—	—	142
When We Stay Alive	2020	—	—	—	—	—	—	—	—	—	—
Madness	2022	—	—	—	—	—	—	—	83	—	—
Dreams Go	2025	—	—	—	—	—	—	—	—	—	—
Better Live	2026	—	—	—	—	—	—	—	—	—	—
"—" denotes a recording that did not chart or was not released in that territory.

=== Extended plays ===
- Raw Exit (2014)

=== Singles ===
List of singles, with selected chart positions
Title	Year	Peak positions		Album
Title	Year	BEL (Fl) Tip	BEL (Wa) Tip	Album
"Dark Star"	2012	2	42	Give You the Ghost
"Wandering Star"	2012	36	—	Give You the Ghost
"Lay Your Cards Out"	2012	62	—	Give You the Ghost
"Form"	2013	82	—	Give You the Ghost
"Tiff" (featuring Justin Vernon)	2013	—	—	Shulamith
"Chain My Name"	2013	60	—	Shulamith
"Lime Habit"	2015	—	—	United Crushers
"Wedding"	2016	—	—	United Crushers
"How Is This Happening"	2017	—	—	Music for the Long Emergency
"Driving"	2019	—	—	When We Stay Alive
"Forget Me Now"	2019	—	—	When We Stay Alive
"Steady"	2020	—	—	When We Stay Alive
"Sea Without Blue"	2020	—	—	When We Stay Alive
