= Mixed Blood Majority =

American hip-hop group

- Origin: Minneapolis, Minnesota, U.S.
- Genres: Hip-hop, alternative hip-hop
- Years active: 2013-present
- Members: Crescent Moon; Joe Horton; Lazerbeak

Mixed Blood Majority is an American hip-hop group from Minneapolis, Minnesota. The trio includes producer Lazerbeak of Doomtree, and rappers Alexei "Crescent Moon" Casselle of Kill the Vultures and Joe Horton of No Bird Sing.

Star Tribune critic Chris Riemenschneider described the band as "innovative, gritty hip-hop" whose music "raises relevant, bleak social issues without bringing the party down." The group has shared stages with well-known artists such as Sage Francis, P.O.S, Aceyalone, and Slick Rick.

== History ==
Mixed Blood Majority began in 2012 as two separate projects, with Lazerbeak working individually with each rapper, before they decided to join forces on realizing that their shared interest in dark, propulsive hip-hop was a good fit with each other. Music writer Jack Spencer of City Pages wrote that the move to a trio with two rappers trading verses "removed some of the weight of carrying entire songs, which allowed for expressions and styles that the rappers' main projects would not have conjured."

The trio released their first album, Mixed Blood Majority, in 2013. It featured guest performance by rappers Cecil Otter of Doomtree, Toki Wright and Kristoff Krane. Mixed Blood Majority was named one of the best Minnesota records of the year by the Star Tribune, which called it "dark, dense and devilish."

Their second album, Insane World, was released in 2015. The album was released by the Minnesota label F | X, which also put out albums from Moon & Pollution and Kill the Vultures. Insane World was named No. 15 in a list of the top 20 Minnesota records of 2015 in the Star Tribune's survey of Twin Cities music critics. The Star Tribune's review said that the album "wildly offsets the seething, bleary-eyed view of race relations and socioeconomics of co-leaders Crescent Moon and Joe Horton with some of the rowdiest, liveliest, most dance-floor-ready beats of producer Lazerbeak's career. It's as fun a record as it is scary, as visceral as it is provocative." Amoeba Music called Insane World "essential hip hop listening."

== Discography ==
=== Albums ===
- Mixed Blood Majority (2013)
- Insane World (2015)
