= Blow Up (magazine) =

Italian music magazine

- Editor: Stefano Isidoro Bianchi
- Categories: Music magazine
- Frequency: Bi-monthly
- Publisher: Tuttle Publishing
- Founder: Stefano Isidoro Bianchi
- First issue: 1 September 1995; 29 years ago
- Country: Italy
- Based in: Tuscany
- Language: Italian
- Website: www.blowupmagazine.com

Blow Up is an Italian monthly music magazine, focusing primarily on alternative and obscure music. It specializes in the coverage of house music, electronica, experimental music, industrial music, queercore, techno, and jazz improvisation. Besides articles related to music, the magazine also contains sections devoted to literature and film analysis. The editor of the magazine is Stefano Isidoro Bianchi, who is also the founder. The section on literature is curated by Fabio Donalisio and the film section by Roberto Curti.

== History and profile ==
Blow Up was founded in September 1995 as a fanzine that evolved into a monthly magazine. After six numbers, in fact, the fanzine magazine becomes available only by subscription. In June 1998 the magazine arrives on newsstands.

Blow Up is published by Tuttle Publishing, founded by Bianchi in 1997 and based in Cortona, Tuscany. The name was inspired by the character Archibald "Harry" Tuttle of the 1985 movie Brazil. In addition to the magazine, the Tuttle opened in 2003, a series of books titled "The Books of Harry", dedicated to strands, themes and cultural phenomena related to music and rock culture. Fifteen volumes have been published to date.

The magazine has received the Premio Lo Straniero in 2010, with the following motivation: "By acting from the margins and in total independence, [Stefano Isidoro Bianchi] preceded the prior music press for treating non-conventional or free distribution in the national territory, and has contributed significantly to the formation of the latest generation of listeners, musicians and critics. In a period of the utmost confusion in music, [Stefano Isidoro Bianchi] kept his desire to offer routes of synthesis that were trying to be placed into coherent movements, which were otherwise isolated or fragmented, that crossed the body of underground music."

== See also ==
- List of magazines published in Italy
