= Roma di Luna =

American folk/Americana group

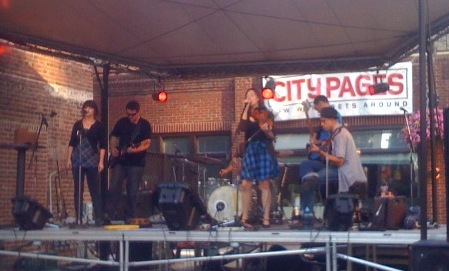
- Roma Di Luna in 2009

Background information
- Origin: Minneapolis, Minnesota
- Genres: Folk, Americana
- Years active: 2004-Present
- Spinoffs: Poliça
- Spinoff of: Kill the Vultures

Roma di Luna is an American folk/Americana group from Minneapolis, Minnesota, formed in 2004. The band released four records, including most recently We Were Made To Forgive in 2018. The group began as a husband-and-wife duo comprising Alexei Casselle of Kill the Vultures and Channy Leaneagh, later of Poliça, before expanding to a group of seven.

While the group did not break through to mainstream success, they were consistently praised by critics and musicians such as Liz Phair.

== History ==
=== 2004-07: Formation, Face Of My Friends, and Find Your Way Home ===
Casselle and Leaneagh met in high school and dated off and on before starting a musical duo in 2004, and started performing by busking at local farmer's markets in Minneapolis. The name "Roma di Luna" roughly translates to "gypsies of the moon," and refers to the band's interest in Eastern European folk music, and shared European and Native American heritage.

Casselle had previously been known as a rapper with the groups Oddjobs and Kill the Vultures. His interest in blues and folk music was ignited by becoming a fan of Bob Dylan while living in New York with Oddjobs, which inspired him to learn guitar. Leaneagh, who grew up listening to folk and Americana music, was also classically trained on violin. Leaneagh was also influenced by singers such as Billie Holiday, Hank Williams, and Indian and South Asian female singers. (She had lived in Southeast Asia for several years.) The couple co-wrote most of their songs, which often dealt with dark, serious topics, such as violence in north Minneapolis and Casselle's relationship with his father, as well as the couple's shared Native American heritage. Star Tribune critic Chris Riemenschneider described the duo as a "rustic, semirootsy, sometimes uncomfortably intimate folk act." He also praised Leaneagh's singing as "riveting ... at once sirenlike and sweet but also fragile and haunted-sounding. It's a sharp contrast to [Casselle's] booming, dry, leathery voice." Casselle worked on both Kill the Vultures and Roma di Luna simultaneously. Casselle and Leaneagh married in 2005.

The duo released a short EP, Face Of My Friends, in 2006. Riemenschneider's review called it "a less-than-happy mix of haunting dirges and candlelight ballads" that he felt was among "this year's prettiest local [discs]." A full-length debut record, Find Your Way Home, followed in 2007, which included a cover of Neutral Milk Hotel's "In the Aeroplane Over the Sea". It was produced by Ben Durrant, who also worked on Andrew Bird's Armchair Apocrypha and Martin Dosh's The Lost Take, and would later join Roma di Luna as a full band member. Riemenschneider wrote that the album "features a lot of eerie ambience and rustic instrumentation, which suits the hallowed-sounding songs."

=== 2008-11: Casting the Bones, Then The Morning Came, and breakup ===
Over time, the group grew larger, becoming a seven-piece band by 2010. Its musical style also began to broaden, drawing in influences from soul, gospel, and rock as well as folk and blues, drawing comparisons to alt-country groups such as Cowboy Junkies and Calexico.

The group released their second album, Casting the Bones, in 2008. It was recorded in a single weekend. The songs began as spare arrangements for the duo, but were fleshed out into lusher versions by the full band, such redoing as the older song "These Tears Ain’t Mine" in a more R&B-inflected arrangement. The band also tackled political material on songs like "Pearls for Pigs", which was about the history of the American Indian Movement. Riemenschneider named Casting the Bones one of the best albums of 2008, praising the "intimate, evocative songs" and Leaneagh's "serene, siren-like singing".

The band followed Bones with the limited-release EP Home Recordings later in 2008 and the holiday EP Christmas in 2009.

The band's third album, Then The Morning Came, was released in 2010, after a delay caused by several of the band members (including Casselle and Leaneagh) taking a break to have children. Thematically, the album dealt with not only new life and parenthood, but the loss and grief from the recent deaths of close friends and family members. Ross Raihala of the St. Paul Pioneer Press praised the album's diverse sound, saying that it "uses dusty Americana as a base and adds blues and soul to the mix to create alluring, highly dramatic music." The album was also named No. 5 in a list of the top 10 Minnesota records of 2010 in the Star Tribune's annual survey of Twin Cities music critics, which called it "a truly soul-searching batch of powerful songs."

Casselle and Leaneagh divorced in 2011, also ending Roma di Luna. The band's last performance before breaking up was at the 2011 festival SoundTown in Somerset, Wisconsin. Alexei Casselle did not perform with the group. The performance was cut short when the mainstage performer, the New Pornographers, unwittingly drowned out the quieter Roma di Luna, leading Leaneagh to remark that "Now you won’t be able to hear us anymore." Two scheduled farewell concerts were later cancelled.

=== 2012-present: Reunion, other projects, and We Were Made To Forgive ===
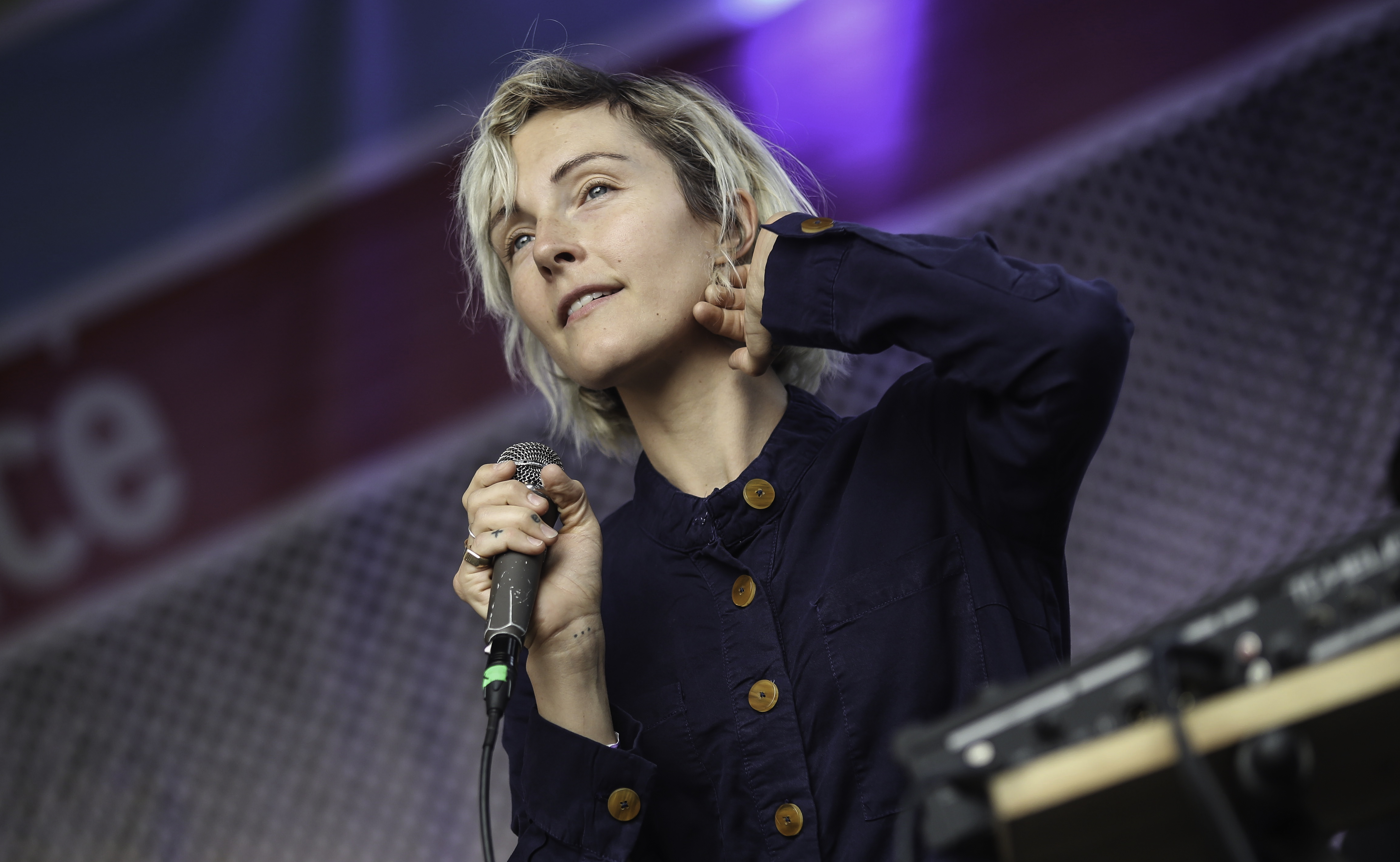
Leaneagh in 2018 with Poliça

After the breakup, Leaneagh joined the rock/R&B group Gayngs, which developed into the synth-pop group Poliça. She married her Poliça bandmate Ryan Olson in 2015, and had another daughter. Casselle continued to work with his other groups, Kill the Vultures and Mixed Blood Majority. He also became a teacher.

Roma di Luna reunited in 2017 for a concert fundraiser for the American Indian organization Honor the Earth, backed by the 30-member Prairie Fire Lady Choir. A fourth album, We Were Made To Forgive, was released in 2018. The album was a mix of new material and older songs from before the breakup that had never been released. Riemenschneider's review called it "excellent."

== Members ==
- Alexei Moon Casselle: Guitar, vocals
- Channy Leaneagh (often credited as Channy Moon Casselle): Vocals, violin
- Ben Durrant: Guitar, production
- Ryan Lovan: Drums
- Jessi Prusha: Backup vocals
- James Everest: Bass
- Michael Rossetto: Banjo

== Discography ==
=== Albums and EPs ===
- Face Of My Friends EP (2006)
- Find Your Way Home (2007)
- Casting The Bones (2008)
- Home Recordings EP (2008)
- Christmas EP (2009)
- Then The Morning Came (2010)
- We Were Made to Forgive (2018)
