= No Bird Sing =

American hip hop group

- Origin: Minneapolis, Minnesota, United States
- Genres: Hip hop, alternative hip hop
- Years active: 2008–present
- Labels: Strange Famous; F to I to X
- Members: Joe Horton; Robert Mulrennan; Graham O'Brien

No Bird Sing is an alternative hip hop group from Minneapolis, Minnesota. In 2013 they signed to Strange Famous Records.

Rapper Joe Horton also performs with Minneapolis hip-hop trio Mixed Blood Majority.

== Members ==
- Joe Horton - rapper/piano/producer
- Robert Mulrennan - guitarist/producer
- Graham O'Brien - drummer/producer

== Discography ==
Albums

- No Bird Sing (self-released, 2009)
- Theft of the Commons (Crushkill Recordings, 2011)
- Definition Sickness (Strange Famous Records and F to I to X, 2013)
