= Lookbook (band) =

American synthpop dio

- Origin: Minneapolis, Minnesota
- Genres: Synthpop
- Years active: 2008–present
- Labels: Listening Party
- Members: Maggie Morrison; Grant Cutler

Lookbook is an American synthpop duo based in Minneapolis, Minnesota. It consists of singer Maggie Morrison and multi-instrumentalist Grant Cutler. In 2009, Lookbook was named the Best New Band in City Pages' Best of the Twin Cities poll. In January 2014, The Current listed the band as their Artist of the Month.

In 2008, Lookbook released the EP, I Fear You, My Darkness. In 2009, the band released the first studio album, Wild at Heart, which was later released online in 2010.

Maggie Morrison's vocal style has been compared to Karen O, Cyndi Lauper, Scandal's Patty Smyth, and Bridget Fonda.

== Discography ==
=== Albums ===
- Wild at Heart (2009)

=== EPs ===
- I Fear You, My Darkness (2008)
