= Atmosphere discography =

- Studio albums: 13
- Extended plays: 10
- Compilation albums: 4
- Singles: 18
- Sad Clown/Bad Dub: 13

This is a comprehensive discography of Atmosphere, a Minneapolis, Minnesota-based underground hip hop group formed in 1996.

== Studio albums ==
Year	Title	Peak chart positions				Notes
Year	Title	US	US R&B	US Ind.	UK R&B	Notes
1997	Overcast!: Label: Rhymesayers; Released: August 5, 1997	—	—	—	—	Extended version of the Overcast! EP.
2002	God Loves Ugly: Released: June 11, 2002; Label: Rhymesayers, Fat Beats	139	43	—	—	Also released as God Loves Ugly (Instrumentals).
2003	Seven's Travels: Released: September 23, 2003; Label: Rhymesayers, Epitaph	83	58	5	—	Also released as Seven's Travels (Instrumentals).
2005	You Can't Imagine How; Much Fun We're Having: Released: October 4, 2005; Label: Rhymesayers	66	55	1	—	
2008	When Life Gives You Lemons, You Paint That Shit Gold: Release: April 22, 2008; Label: Rhymesayers	5	13	2	—	
2011	The Family Sign: Release: April 12, 2011; Label: Rhymesayers	13	3	2	—	
2014	Southsiders: Release: May 6, 2014; Label: Rhymesayers	8	3	2	33	
2016	Fishing Blues: Release: August 12, 2016; Label: Rhymesayers	22	2	1	—	
2018	Mi Vida Local: Release: October 5, 2018; Label: Rhymesayers	129	—	7	—	
2019	Whenever: Release: December 13, 2019; Label: Rhymesayers	—	—	—	—	
2020	The Day Before Halloween: Release: October 30, 2020; Label: Rhymesayers	—	—	—	—	
2021	Word?: Release: October 8, 2021; Label: Rhymesayers	—	—	—	—	
2023	So Many Other Realities Exist Simultaneously: Release: May 5, 2023; Label: Rhymesayers	—	—	—	—	
2025	Jestures: Release: September 19, 2025; Label: Rhymesayers	—	—	—	—	

== Extended plays ==
Year	Title	Notes
1997	Overcast!: Label: Rhymesayers	Re-released later the same year as the LP Overcast!.
2000	Ford One: Released: September 1, 2000; Label: Rhymesayers	Collected and re-released on Lucy Ford: The Atmosphere EPs in 2001.
2000	Ford Two: Released: September 1, 2000; Label: Rhymesayers	Collected and re-released on Lucy Ford: The Atmosphere EPs in 2001.
2001	The Lucy EP: Label: Rhymesayers, Fat Beats	Collected and re-released on Lucy Ford: The Atmosphere EPs in 2001.
2007	Strictly Leakage: Released: December 25, 2007; Label: Rhymesayers	Released as a free digital download.; -
2009	Leak at Will: Released: July 4, 2009; Label: Rhymesayers	Released as a free digital download.
2010	To All My Friends, Blood Makes The Blade Holy: The Atmosphere EP's: Released: September 7, 2010; Label: Rhymesayers	
2013	Demosexual 7": Released: April 20, 2013; Label: Rhymesayers	Record Store Day exclusive. Demo's from 2009/2010
2014	The Lake Nokomis Maxi Single: Released: April 19, 2014; Label: Rhymesayers	Record Store Day exclusive. Contains tracks that would serve as the bonus tracks for Southsiders
2016	Frida Kahlo vs. Ezra Pound: Released: December 9, 2016; Label: Rhymesayers	Also released as Frida Kahlo vs. Ezra Pound (Instrumentals).
2023	Talk Talk: Released: December 1, 2023; Label: Rhymesayers	

== Compilation albums ==
Year	Title	Peak chart positions			Notes
Year	Title	US	US R&B	US Ind.	Notes
2001	Lucy Ford: The Atmosphere EPs: Released: February 1, 2001; Label: Rhymesayers, Fat Beats	—	—	—	Collection of three previously released EPs: The Lucy EP, Ford 1, and Ford 2.
2005	Headshots: SE7EN: Label: Rhymesayers	165	100	12	Re-released and remastered version of Headshots: Vol.7, a 1998 cassette featuring Atmosphere.
2018	Sad Clown Bad Year (#9-#12 Collection): Label: Rhymesayers	—	—	—	Collection of four previously released EPs: Sad Clown Bad Summer 9, Sad Clown Bad Fall 10, Sad Clown Bad Winter 11, Sad Clown Bad Spring 12.
2025	Triple X Years In The Game	—	—	—	

== Sad Clown/Bad Dub series ==
Between major releases, Atmosphere has released various live albums and EPs of unreleased material under the "Sad Clown/Bad Dub" title.

- Sad Clown Bad Dub (1999)
- Sad Clown Bad Dub II (2000)
- Sad Clown Bad Dub 3 (2002)
- Sad Clown Bad Dub 4 DVD (2002)
- Sad Clown Bad Dub 5 (2003)
- Sad Clown Bad Dub 6 (2003)
- Random Vol. 3/Sad Clown Bad Dub 7 (2003)
- Happy Clown Bad Dub 8/Fun EP (2006)
- Sad Clown Bad Summer 9 (2007)
- Sad Clown Bad Fall 10 (2007)
- Sad Clown Bad Winter 11 (2007)
- Sad Clown Bad Spring 12 (2008)
- Sad Clown Bad Dub 13 DVD (2008)
- Sad Clown Bad Dub II (2023 re-release)

== Singles ==
Year	Title	Peak chart positions			Certifications	Album
Year	Title	US Alt.	US R&B	US Rap	Certifications	Album
1998	"They Lied"	—	—	—		
2002	"Uptown Jesus"	—	—	—		
2002	"Modern Man's Hustle"	—	—	18		God Loves Ugly
2002	"GodLovesUgly"	—	—	—		God Loves Ugly
2003	"Fuck You Lucy"	—	—	—		God Loves Ugly
2003	"Cats Van Bags" (featuring Brother Ali)	—	—	—		Seven's Travels
2003	"Trying to Find a Balance"	—	—	—		Seven's Travels
2003	"Say Shh"	—	—	—		Seven's Travels
2004	"National Disgrace"	—	—	—		Seven's Travels
2005	"Watch Out"	—	—	—		You Can't Imagine How Much Fun We're Having
2006	"Say Hey There"	—	—	—		You Can't Imagine How Much Fun We're Having
2007	"Sunshine"	—	—	—	RIAA: Gold	Sad Clown Bad Summer 9
2008	"Shoulda Known"	—	—	—		When Life Gives You Lemons, You Paint That Shit Gold
2008	"Guarantees"	—	—	—		When Life Gives You Lemons, You Paint That Shit Gold
2008	"You"	38	—	—		When Life Gives You Lemons, You Paint That Shit Gold
2009	"Your Glasshouse"	—	—	—		When Life Gives You Lemons, You Paint That Shit Gold
2010	"To All My Friends"	—	—	—		To All My Friends, Blood Makes the Blade Holy: The Atmosphere EP's
2011	"Just for Show"	—	—	—		The Family Sign
2011	"She's Enough"	—	—	—		The Family Sign
2011	"The Last to Say"	—	—	—		The Family Sign
2011	"Ain't Nobody"	—	—	—		The Family Sign
2012	"Someday Soon"	—	62	—		Someday Soon / Bats (Record Store Day 2012 Picture Disc, with The Uncluded)
2013	"Bob Seger"	—	—	—		The Lake Nokomis Maxi Single
2013	"Color In The Snow" (featuring Dem Atlas, Joe Horton, Toki Wright)	—	—	—		Non-album single
2014	"Southsiders (Remix)"	—	—	—		Southsiders
2014	"Bitter"	—	—	—		Southsiders
2014	"Kanye West"	—	—	—		Southsiders
2014	"My Lady Got Two Men"	—	—	—		Southsiders
2014	"Fortunate"	—	—	—		Southsiders
2015	"January On Lake Street"	—	—	—		Southsiders
2015	"Ear Blister"	—	—	—		Non-album single
2015	"Sunshine"	—	—	—		Sad Clown Bad Summer 9
2015	"Finer Things" (featuring Dem Atlas)	—	—	—		Frida Kahlo Vs Ezra Pound
2015	"This Lonely Rose" (featuring Blueprint, Aesop Rock)	—	—	—		Frida Kahlo Vs Ezra Pound
2015	"My Best Half"	—	—	—		Frida Kahlo Vs Ezra Pound
2016	"Salma Hayek"	—	—	—		Frida Kahlo Vs Ezra Pound
2016	"Trying To Fly" (featuring Eric Mayson)	—	—	—		Frida Kahlo Vs Ezra Pound
2016	"Fireflies" (featuring Grieves)	—	—	—		Frida Kahlo Vs Ezra Pound
2016	"Windows" (featuring Prof)	—	—	—		Frida Kahlo Vs Ezra Pound
2016	"Ringo"	—	—	—		Fishing Blues
2016	"No Biggie"	—	—	—		Fishing Blues
2016	"Pure Evil"	—	—	—		Fishing Blues
2016	"A Long Hello"	—	—	—		Fishing Blues
2018	"Make It All Better Again"	—	—	—		Mi Vida Local
2018	"Virgo"	—	—	—		Mi Vida Local
2018	"Jerome"	—	—	—		Mi Vida Local
2018	"Graffiti"	—	—	—		Mi Vida Local
2018	"Drown" (featuring Cashinova, The Lioness, deM atlaS)	—	—	—		Mi Vida Local
2019	"Stopwatch"	—	—	—		Mi Vida Local
2019	"Delicate"	—	—	—		Mi Vida Local
2019	"Bad Days Are Over" (with Dem Atlas)	—	—	—		Non-album single
2019	"Specificity"	—	—	—		Mi Vida Local
2019	"Earring" (featuring Musab)	—	—	—		Mi Vida Local
2019	"Bde Maka Ska"	—	—	—		Whenever
2019	"Lovely" (featuring Nikki Jean)	—	—	—		Whenever
2020	"Love Each Other"	—	—	—		Whenever
2020	"Dearly Beloved" (featuring Musab, Muja Messiah)	—	—	—		Whenever
2020	"Whenever"	—	—	—		Whenever
2021	"God's Bathroom Floor"	—	—	—		Overcast! (EP) (Originally from the EP version of Overcast!, but not included on the LP version. Released in celebration of song's 25th anniversary.)
2021	"Heavy D" (with Murs as Felt)	—	—	—		Non-album single
2021	"Woes"	—	—	—		Word?
2021	"Clocked"	—	—	—		Word?
2021	"Pressed" (featuring Anwar HighSign, BlackLiq, Sa-Roc, Haphduzn, Lateef the Truthspeaker)	—	—	—		Word?
2022	"The Muah On Your Cheek" (with The Grouch)	—	—	—		Non-album single
2022	"Melancholaholic" (with Horrorshow)	—	—	—		Bad Feelings
2023	"Okay"	—	—	—		So Many Other Realities Exist Simultaneously
2023	"Holding My Breath"	—	—	—		So Many Other Realities Exist Simultaneously
2023	"Still Life"	—	—	—		So Many Other Realities Exist Simultaneously
2023	"Talk Talk" (featuring Bat Flower)	—	—	—		Talk Talk
2023	"Rotary Telephone"	—	—	—		Talk Talk
2023	"Traveling Forever"	—	—	—		Talk Talk
2024	"Hear Hear" (featuring Bat Flower)	—	—	—		Talk Talk
2025	"XXX"	—	—	—		Triple X Years In The Game
2025	"Velour"	—	—	—		Jestures
2025	"Really"	—	—	—		Jestures
