= Slug (rapper) =

American rapper (born 1972)

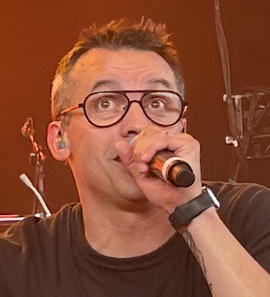
- Slug in 2023

Background information
- Born: Sean Michael Daley; September 7, 1972 (age 54); Minneapolis, Minnesota, U.S.
- Genre: Twin Cities hip-hop
- Years active: 1989–present
- Labels: Rhymesayers; Warner Music Group; Epitaph; Fat Beats; Women
- Member of: Atmosphere
- Website: rhymesayers.com

Sean Michael Daley (born September 7, 1972), better known by his stage name Slug, is an American rapper from Minneapolis, Minnesota. He is one-half of the hip-hop group Atmosphere, alongside producer Anthony Davis (Ant). Daley is also the co-founder of Minneapolis-based independent hip hop record label Rhymesayers Entertainment alongside Davis, Musab Saad, and Brent Sayers.

== Biography ==
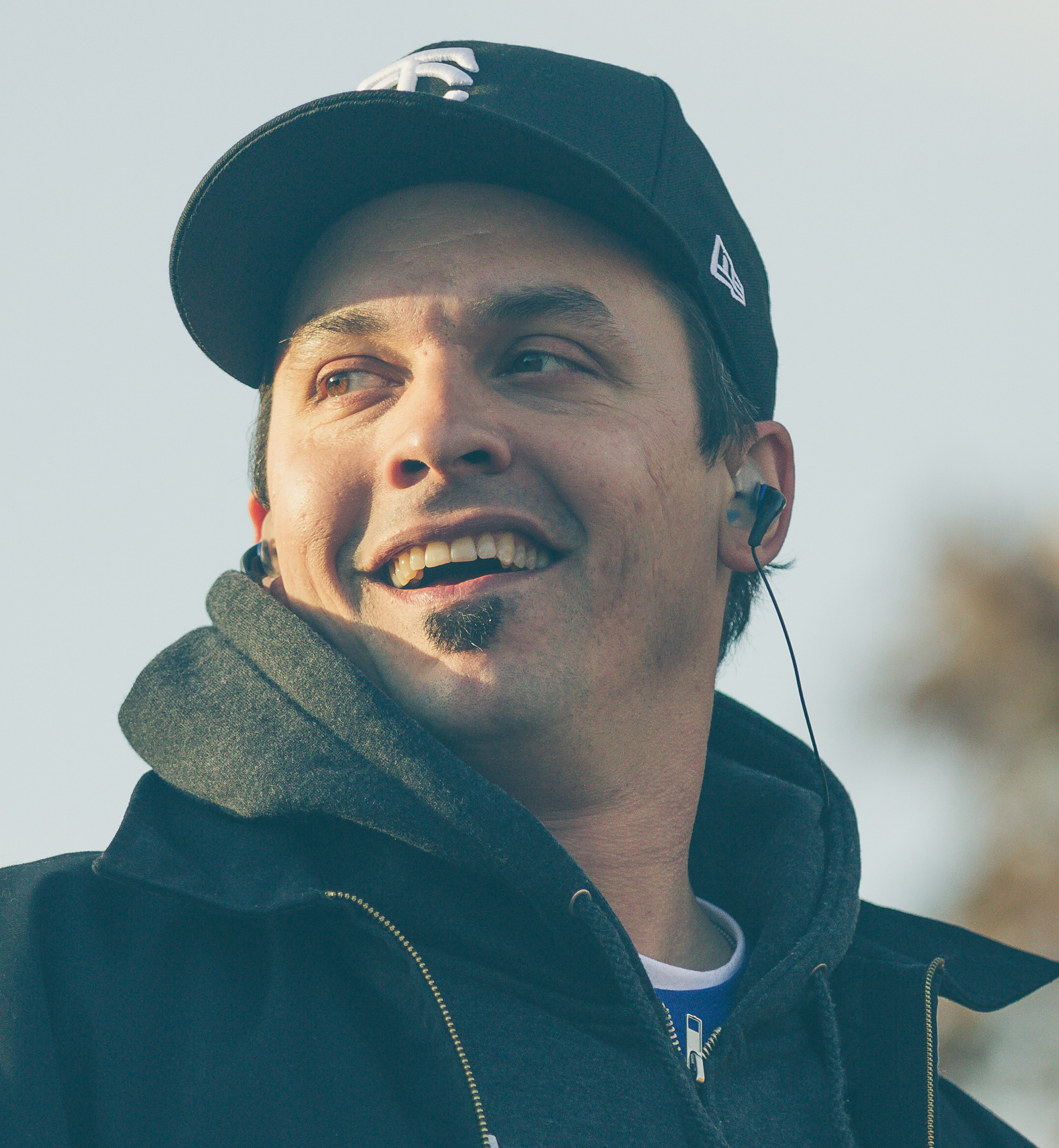
Slug in 2012

Slug was born Sean Michael Daley in Minneapolis, Minnesota, on September 7, 1972. The son of Valerie and Craig Daley, he is of Irish, Norwegian, South African, and Native American descent. Daley's nickname comes from his father being known to his friends as "Sluggo", thus they began to call Daley "little Sluggo," which was then shortened to "Slug". In Atmosphere's early years, Daley DJ'd behind the scenes and let Spawn handle lyrics. The group eventually formed a strong relationship with Ant (Anthony Davis) and began collaborating on music. Along with solo MC Musab (then Beyond), and groups Black hole, Phull Surkle, and the Abstract Pack they formed the mid-1990s crew Headshots, with Daley appearing on the underground tape series HeadShots (1-7).

Slug later formed the duo Felt with his friend and fellow underground rapper Murs. Other groups he has been a part of include The Dynospectrum, in which he was known as "Sep Se7en", and Deep Puddle Dynamics. He is a member of a loose collective known as The Orphanage, along with Aesop Rock, Illogic, Eyedea and Blueprint.

== Lyrical themes ==
A prominent theme in lyrics is his allegorical usage of women, especially in his earlier work. A notable use of women by Slug is in the song "Woman with the Tattooed Hands", which Slug has said is "a metaphor for that same stuff that everybody has already made songs about". Further uses come in the form of the song "Abusing of the Rib" from Headshots: SE7EN: it has been said that the "lover" that Slug speaks of is actually an allegory for a girlfriend addicted to heroin.

A character Slug refers to as "Lucy", who has been purported to symbolize a range of different entities, is the most notable of these allegories. In earlier Atmosphere songs, it is believed that Slug used Lucy as a means of writing about ex-girlfriends. Lucy became so prominent that Atmosphere's 2001 album bore her name, Lucy Ford: The Atmosphere EPs, with the record itself concentrating fairly heavily on women and relationships, in songs such as "Don't Ever Fucking Question That" and "Mama Had A Baby And His Head Popped Off". Slug himself has since said of Lucy that he originally believed "her" to be a representation of the dichotomy between himself and women. He acknowledges now that Lucy became a demonization ("Lucy Ford" being a play on words for Lucifer) of himself and his dependency on alcohol, drugs, sex and validation.

Slug raps in an introspective style, as seen on the song "Little Man", in which he confronts the complaints that people have about him by looking at his relationship with his father and son. This introspective style has become less prevalent as of Atmosphere's 2008 album When Life Gives You Lemons, You Paint That Shit Gold in which Slug navigates through other people's lives. Slug has stated that in and around the year of 2005, he began to move in a new direction lyrically as he became more aware of the effect his lyrics would have on kids, especially his own son who was becoming a teenager at the time.

== Discography ==
=== Atmosphere ===
- Overcast! (1997)
- God Loves Ugly (2002)
- Seven's Travels (2003)
- You Can't Imagine How Much Fun We're Having (2005)
- When Life Gives You Lemons, You Paint That Shit Gold (2008)
- The Family Sign (2011)
- Southsiders (2014)
- Fishing Blues (2016)
- Mi Vida Local (2018)
- Whenever (2019)
- The Day Before Halloween (2020)
- WORD? (2021)
- So Many Other Realities Exist Simultaneously (2023)
- Triple X Years In The Game (2025)
- Jestures (2025)

=== Felt ===
- Felt: A Tribute to Christina Ricci (2002)
- Felt, Vol. 2: A Tribute to Lisa Bonet (2005)
- Felt 3: A Tribute to Rosie Perez (2009)
- Felt 4 U (2020)

=== Deep Puddle Dynamics ===
- The Taste of Rain... Why Kneel? (1999)

=== Dynospectrum ===
- Dynospectrum (1998)

=== Collaborations ===
Year	Song	Artist	Album	Label
1996	"B.L.A.K. Culture" and "Unaligned Sperms"	Beyond	Comparison	Rhymesayers Entertainment
1996	"Pea King"	Casino Royale	Hank Mobley's Sound of Love	Anal Log Music
1999	"I'll Be OK"	Aesop Rock	Float	Mush Records
2000	"Never"	Unknown Prophets	World Premier	Unknown Prophets
2000	"Slug & Sage Freestyle parts I & II"	Sage Francis	Still Sick... Urine Trouble	Strange Famous Records
2000	"Exclusive"	DJ Abilities	For Persons With DJ Abilities	Rhymesayers Entertainment
2001	"Frisbee"	Abstract Rude	P.A.I.N.T.	Battle Axe Records
2001	"Forget Me"	Eyedea	The Many Faces of Oliver Hart	Rhymesayers Entertainment
2001	"Night Prowler" and "Nothing Less"	Living Legends	Almost Famous	Legendary Music
2001	"Uncle Sam"	All Natural	Second Nature	All Natural Inc.
2001	"Days Grow Old", "Orphanage Freestyle Parts 1 & 2"	Sage Francis	Sick Of Waiting Tables	Strange Famous Records
2001	"Put Your Quarter Up"	Molemen	Ritual of the Molemen	Molemen Records
2001	"All I Have"	Rusty Ps	Out of Many	
2002	"Global"	The Planets	The Opening	Red Sea Entertainment
2002	"In Regrets"	Heiruspecs	Small Steps	Interlock
2002	"Gotta Love 'Em"	DJ Murge	Search And Rescue	Battle Axe Records
2002	"Lambslaughter"	Prime	Madman (single)	Molemen Records
2002	"Embarrassed"	Sage Francis	Sick Of Waging War	Strange Famous Records
2002	"Unsatisfied and Fuck Heros"	Eligh	Luckiam.PSC	Living Legends
2002	"Edie Brikell"	DJ Vadim	USSR: The Art of Listening	Ninja Tune
2003	"Blah Blah Blah" and "Missing Teeth"	Brother Ali	Shadows on the Sun	Rhymesayers Entertainment
2003	"Fallen"	Vakill	The Darkest Cloud	Molemen Records
2004	"Sex And More"	Fred Ones	Phobia Of Doors 12	Traffic Entertainment Group
2004	"The Great Debate"	Blowfly	Fahrenheit 69	Alternative Tentacles
2004	"Steel Toe vs. The Rookie"	Micranots	The Emperor & the Assassin	Rhymesayers Entertainment
2004	"Doomage" and “Stuck”	Sage Francis	Sickly Business	Strange Famous Records
2004	"Hold Mine"	Blueprint	Vitamins & Minerals (EP)	Weightless Recordings
2004	"(Even) More Human Than Human"	X-Ecutioners	Revolutions	Sony Records
2005	"You're A Bitch Too"	D-Tension	"You're A Bitch Too" (single)	Brick Records
2005	"Track 05"	Blockhead	Block in the Box (promo CD)	
2006	"My Alien Girlfriend"	Molemen	Killing Fields	Molemen Records
2006	"Bleeding Hearts Club (MPLS Chapter)" and "Bush League Psyche-Out Stuff"	P.O.S	Audition	Rhymesayers Entertainment
2006	"Moving At The Speed Of Life"	Living Legends	Legendary Music Vol. 1	Legendary Music
2007	"The League of Extraordinary Nobodies"	El-P	I'll Sleep When You're Dead	Definitive Jux
2007	"Line Of Scrimmage"	Evidence	The Weatherman LP	ABB Records
2007	"The Office"	Grayskul	Bloody Radio	Rhymesayers Entertainment
2007	"Dance With Me"	Hangar 18	Sweep the Leg	
2008	"O’Silly Me"	Muja Messiah	MPLS Massacre	
2008	"What’s This World Coming To"	Muja Messiah	The Adventures of a B-Boy D-Boy	
2008	"Oh Really"	Jake One	White Van Music	Rhymesayers Entertainment
2009	"Don't Leave (When the Winter Comes)"	CunninLynguists	Strange Journey Volume One	QN5 Music
2009	"We Made It"	Krs-One and Buckshot	Survival Skills	
2009	"Supervillainz"	DOOM	Born Like This	Lex
2009	"!BOOM!"	The Grouch & Eligh	SAY G&E	Legendary Music
2009	"In Your Soul"	C-Rayz Walz	Who the F@%k Are You?	Definitive Jux Records
2010	"Work"	Kristoff Krane	Picking Flowers Next to Road Kill	
2010	"Buzzkill"	Intuition	Girls Like Me	Hellfyre Club
2010	"Hip-Hop"	King Magnetic	Everything's A Gamble Vol. 2	King Mag Music/Fat Beats
2011	"Late For The Sky"	Evidence	Cats & Dogs	Rhymesayers Entertainment
2013	"Swimming"	PROF	Kaiser Von Powderhorn 3	Stophouse Music Group
2013	"Go!"	AWKWORD	World View	Sub-City Productions
2014	"Astronauts"	Grieves	Winter and the Wolves	Rhymesayers Entertainment
2015	"Fun-eral"	Murs	Have a Nice Life	Strange Music
2015	"Tree of Life"	Logic	n/a	SoundCloud
2016	"Slow Down"	ILLUS	A Perfectly Imperfect Beautiful Naked Creation	ILLUS MEDIA
2016	"Murals / Changes"	Berner and Mistah F.A.B.	Hempire	Bern One Entertainment
2016	"Never Stop the Show"	Classified	Greatful	Halflife Records
2018	"Powder Cocaine"	Evidence	Weather or Not	Rhymesayers Entertainment
2019	"Sand Dunes", "Pistol Dave"	Epic Beard Men	This Was Supposed To Be Fun	Strange Famous
