= Overcast! (EP) =

Overcast! EP

EP by Atmosphere
- Released: 1997
- Genre: Hip-hop
- Label: Rhymesayers Entertainment
- Producer: Ant

Atmosphere chronology
Overcast! EP (1997)	Overcast! (1997)

Overcast! is Atmosphere's breakthrough EP album, released in 1997.

== Track listing ==
1. Scapegoat (Album Version)
2. Multiples
3. Primer
4. The Outernet
5. Scapegoat (...It's Edited For The Radio)
6. Sound Is Vibration
7. Brief Description
8. God's Bathroom Floor (Stress's 4-track Fiasco)

== Reception ==
In 2013, Sputnikmusic praised Slug's and Spawn's lyricism saying the release was one of the most important to underground hip-hop.
