= Leak at Will =

EP by Atmosphere
- Released: July 4, 2009
- Genres: Hip-hop, alternative hip-hop
- Label: Rhymesayers Entertainment
- Producer: Ant

Atmosphere chronology
When Life Gives You Lemons, You Paint That Shit Gold (2008)	Leak at Will (2009)	To All My Friends, Blood Makes the Blade Holy: The Atmosphere EP's (2010)

Professional ratings
Review scores
Source	Rating
RapReviews	8/10

Leak at Will is a digital EP released by Minneapolis hip-hop group Atmosphere. It was released on July 4, 2009 on Rhymesayers Entertainment for free to celebrate the launch of Fifth Element's turn to digital music. It is the first digital release for the store.

== Background ==
According to Atmosphere, this 7-track EP is a "thank you" for the support the fans have given the band.

The last track is a reiteration of De La Soul's 1991 track "Millie Pulled a Pistol on Santa/Keepin' the Faith".

== Track list ==
1. "C'mon"
2. "They Always Know"
3. "The Ropes"
4. "White Noise"
5. "Feel Good Hit of the Summer Part 2" (Queens Of The Stone Age, Part 1)
6. "Mother's Day"
7. "Millie Fell off the Fire Escape" - the continuation of De La Soul's "Millie Pulled a Pistol on Santa"
