= Strictly Leakage =

Mixtape by Atmosphere
- Released: December 25, 2007
- Genre: Hip-hop
- Length: 42:41
- Label: Rhymesayers Entertainment
- Producer: Ant

Atmosphere chronology
Sad Clown Bad Winter 11 (2007)	Strictly Leakage (2007)	Sad Clown Bad Spring 12 (2008)

Professional ratings
Review scores
Source	Rating
City Pages	unfavorable
Pitchfork	7.8/10
RapReviews.com	8.5/10

Strictly Leakage is a mixtape by American hip-hop group Atmosphere. It was released as a free download through Rhymesayers Entertainment in 2007.

== Reception ==
Jordan Selbo of City Pages gave Strictly Leakage an unfavorable review, saying, "[the] once-bright style Atmosphere became famous for is so established and well-tread that it has now become the status quo they once rebelled so infectiously against."

Writing for Impose, Blake Gillepsie wrote that "as much as Atmosphere rewind to simpler times with Strictly Leakage, Slug has a new writing approach, that of a wise elder that alienates him from his predominantly young audience."

On January 4, 2008, Strictly Leakage was listed by Wired as the "Best Free Download of the Week". On December 19, 2008, it was ranked at number 9 on NPR's "10 Best Mixtapes of the Year" list.

Strictly Leakage was rereleased on Vinyl, CD, and cassette on May 17, 2024.

== Track listing ==
No.	Title	Length
1.	"YGM"	4:10
2.	"Little Math You"	2:46
3.	"Full Moon"	3:45
4.	"The Things That Hate Us"	2:54
5.	"Jewelry"	1:33
6.	"Get It to Get Her"	2:42
7.	"Domestic Dog"	3:13
8.	"Crewed Up" (featuring Stage One, St. Paul Slim, Muja Messiah, YZ, Brother Ali, Toki Wright, and Blueprint)	4:31
9.	"What They Sittin For?"	1:17
10.	"That's Not Beef, That's Pork"	3:48
11.	"The Old Style" (featuring DJ Plain Ol' Bill)	2:51
12.	"You Played Yourself"	4:27
13.	"Road to the Riches" (featuring DJ Plain Ol' Bill)	4:44
