= Headshots: Se7en =

Mixtape by Atmosphere
- Released: January 4, 1999
- Recorded: 1997−1999
- Genre: Hip-hop
- Length: 71:44
- Label: Rhymesayers Entertainment
- Producer: Ant

Atmosphere chronology
Overcast! (1997)	Headshots: Se7en (1999)	Lucy Ford: The Atmosphere EP's (2001)

Professional ratings
Review scores
Source	Rating
Robert Christgau	B+
Exclaim!	favorable
Pitchfork	5.0/10

Headshots: Se7en (stylized as Headshots: SE7EN) is a mixtape by American hip-hop duo Atmosphere. Recorded between 1997 and 1999, it was released only on cassette in 1999. It was re-released in 2005.

== Track listing ==
No.	Title	Length
1.	"Sep Seven Game Show Theme"	4:08
2.	"Round and Round"	3:42
3.	"Tracksmart" (featuring Mr. Gene Poole)	4:10
4.	"Choking on the Wishbone"	4:10
5.	"The Jackpot/Swept Away"	5:35
6.	"@ It Again"	2:06
7.	"The Stick Up" (featuring Eyedea)	4:10
8.	"Lyle Lovette"	1:27
9.	"Higher Living"	4:32
10.	"To the Break of Sean"	3:21
11.	"Deer Wolf"	3:42
12.	"Molly Cool"	4:49
13.	"Dungeons and Dragons" (featuring Musab)	4:46
14.	"Anterlude"	0:38
15.	"Advanced Communications"	2:56
16.	"A Tall Seven and Seven"	2:00
17.	"3.2 Red Dog"	2:07
18.	"The Abusing of the Rib"	3:36
19.	"Write Now (Multiples No. 4)"	2:00
20.	"I Wish Those Cats @ Fobia Would Give Me Some Free Shoes"	3:45
21.	"Heart"	4:05

2005 re-release bonus disc
No.	Title	Artist(s)	Length
1.	"Industrial Warfare"	The Dynospectrum	4:05
2.	"Travel (Remix)"	Atmosphere	4:11
3.	"7th St. Entry"	Atmosphere	2:59
4.	"Sent"	Beyond and Slug	4:51
5.	"Multiples Reprise (Remix)"	Atmosphere	5:38
6.	"Funny Colors in My Mushroom Trails"	Sess and Slug	3:59
7.	"Fuck the Bullshit"	The Dynospectrum	3:59
8.	"Struggle Song"	The Dynospectrum	3:38
9.	"Dubs"	Beyond and Slug	3:33
10.	"Substance Abuse"	Atmosphere featuring Extreme	4:43

== Charts ==
Chart	Peak position
Billboard 200	165
Independent Albums	12
Top R&B/Hip-Hop Albums	100
