= When Life Gives You Lemons, You Paint That Shit Gold =

Studio album by Atmosphere
- Released: April 22, 2008
- Studios: The Hideaway (Minneapolis–Saint Paul, MN)
- Genre: Alternative hip-hop
- Length: 54:41
- Label: Rhymesayers
- Producer: Ant

Atmosphere chronology
You Can't Imagine How Much Fun We're Having (2005)	When Life Gives You Lemons, You Paint That Shit Gold (2008)	The Family Sign (2011)

Alternative cover
- Hard cover book cover

When Life Gives You Lemons, You Paint That Shit Gold is the fifth studio album by American hip-hop duo Atmosphere.

It was released on April 22, 2008, through Rhymesayers Entertainment. Recorded at the Hideaway in Minneapolis–Saint Paul, it was entirely produced by member Ant. Backed by Nate Collis on guitar, Erick Anderson on keyboards, Brett Johnson on bass and Brian McLeod on drums, the album features additional contributions from Joe Mabbott, Scotty Rapp, Mankwe Ndosi, Rajiah Johnson, as well as cameo performances from Channy Moon Casselle, Tunde Adebimpe and Jessie Wilimek on vocals, Dustin Kiel on lap steel guitar, trumpeter Kyle Borchert and beatboxing Tom Waits.

The album was released in two different packages: a standard digipak and a limited edition (25,000 copies) 36-page hard-cover book featuring an illustrated children's story written by Slug and a bonus DVD entitled Sad Clown Bad Dub 13 containing over an hour of live footage and extras.

The album was praised for Ant's live instrumental-based production and Slug's storytelling rap.

== Critical reception ==
Professional ratings
Aggregate scores
Source	Rating
Metacritic	68/100
Review scores
Source	Rating
AllMusic	3.5/5 stars
The A.V. Club	B+
Drowned in Sound	7/10
HipHopDX	4.5/5
MSN Music	B+
Pitchfork	7/10
PopMatters	3/10
RapReviews	9.5/10
Spin	3/5 stars
Tiny Mix Tapes	1/5 marks

When Life Gives You Lemons, You Paint That Shit Gold was met with generally favourable reviews from music critics. At Metacritic, which assigns a normalized rating out of 100 to reviews from mainstream publications, the album received an average score of 68, based on fifteen reviews.

Adam M. Levin of RapReviews praised the album, stating "even though some might miss Slug's angst-ridden diatribes (Lucy Ford is nowhere to be found on this album), he manages to toe the line between rapper and griot better than he ever has before on this new effort". Jeff Ryce of HipHopDX claimed: "the beauty of Lemons is that it will satisfy current fans and play well to an entirely different crowd than their last album".

Christopher Bahn of The A.V. Club wrote: "musically, Lemons is lusher and more ruminative than the harder-hitting Imagine, with producer Ant calling on Atmosphere's live backing band--plus guests, including Tom Waits (beatboxing!) and TV on the Radio's Tunde Adebimpe--to flesh out the sound, enhancing his already-organic approach". Robert Christgau of MSN Music concluded: "nevertheless, the lost lives and loves he sketches are so painfully familiar they feel like truth. And Ant's homey beats enhance the illusion".

Ed Graves of Drowned in Sound determined: "Atmosphere play an autobiographical angle affectingly well. It's an approach that'll lead some to conclude When Life… is a little on the dull side, but with six albums under their belt seems the duo's formula is not about to let them down just yet". Pitchfork reviewer noted: "more energy and less uniformly drab scenery might have kept these well-intentioned stories from blurring into each other".

In his mixed review for Spin, Michael L. Walsh declared: "add some beatboxing courtesy of Tom Waits (!), and you have an occasionally forced, yet boldly magnetic change of pace".

In negative reviews, Chris Gaerig of PopMatters called the album "almost entirely forgettable". Chadwicked of Tiny Mix Tapes stated: "we're given a de trop of horrid synthesizers, only to be outdone by worse choruses and banal refrains".

=== Accolades ===
Accolades for When Life Gives You Lemons, You Paint That Shit Gold
Publication	Accolade	Rank	Ref.
Consequence of Sound	CoS Year-End Report: The Top 100 Albums	9	

== Commercial performance ==
In the United States, When Life Gives You Lemons, You Paint That Shit Gold debuted at number 5 on the Billboard 200, number 13 on the Top R&B/Hip-Hop Albums, number 6 on the Top Rap Albums, number 2 on the Independent Albums and atop the Tastemakers Albums charts, selling about 36,000 copies in its first week, marking the highest Billboard 200 entry for both Atmosphere and Rhymesayers Entertainment label to date. The song "You" peaked at number 38 on the Alternative Songs chart.

The album also signifies Atmosphere's first entry to the Official Charts Company, debuting at number 45 on its Independent Albums Chart in the United Kingdom.

== Track listing ==
All tracks are written by Sean Daley and Anthony Davis.

No.	Title	Length
1.	"Like the Rest of Us"	3:20
2.	"Puppets"	3:41
3.	"The Skinny"	3:36
4.	"Dreamer"	4:04
5.	"Shoulda Known"	3:06
6.	"You"	3:14
7.	"Painting"	3:00
8.	"Your Glasshouse"	3:58
9.	"Yesterday"	3:23
10.	"Guarantees"	4:32
11.	"Me"	3:40
12.	"Wild Wild Horses"	4:14
13.	"Can't Break"	3:33
14.	"The Waitress"	3:00
15.	"In Her Music Box"	4:20
Total length:		54:41

Deluxe edition bonus track
No.	Title	Length
16.	"Vanity Sick"	2:52

2018 deluxe limited edition bonus tracks / Instrumental version
No.	Title	Length
16.	"Keyboard"	3:09
17.	"Vanity Sick"	2:52

iTunes video bonus tracks
No.	Title	Length
17.	"Sunshine" (Live)
18.	"Guarantees" (Live)

Sad Clown Bad Dub 13 DVD
No.	Title	Length
16.	"Introduction"
17.	"In Her Music Box"
18.	"Sunshine"
19.	"Spaghetti Strapped"
20.	"Shoes"
21.	"Less One"
22.	"GodLovesUgly"
23.	"The Woman with the Tattooed Hands"
24.	"Panic Attack"
25.	"Abusing of the Rib"
26.	"God's Bathroom Floor"
27.	"Shrapnel"
28.	"Guarantees"
29.	"Always Coming Back Home to You (with End Credits)"
30.	"Say Shh... (Bonus Song)"

== Personnel ==
Atmosphere

- Sean "Slug" Daley – vocals, executive producer
- Anthony "Ant" Davis – additional vocals (track 13), keyboards, turntables, producer, executive producer

Additional musicians

- Nate Collis – additional vocals (tracks: 2, 10), guitar (tracks: 1, 3, 4, 6, 9–12, 14, 15), synthesizer (tracks: 5, 13)
- Joe Mabbott – additional vocals (tracks: 5, 13), additional percussion (tracks: 1–9, 11–15), recording, mixing
- Channy Moon Casselle – additional vocals (track 2)
- Mankwe Ndosi – additional vocals (tracks: 5, 11)
- Babatunde Adebimpe – additional vocals (track 8)
- Jessie Wilimek – additional vocals (track 15)
- Tom Waits – beatboxing (track 14)
- Dustin Kiel – lap steel guitar (track 7)
- Brett Johnson – bass (tracks: 3–8, 12, 14)
- Erick Anderson – piano (tracks: 1, 2, 9, 14), synthesizer (tracks: 4–6, 8, 12, 13, 15), keyboards (track 7), Rhodes electric piano (tracks: 9, 15)
- Scotty Rapp – synthesizer (tracks: 5, 12, 13, 15)
- Brian McLeod – drums (tracks: 4, 6)
- Rajiah Johnson – flute (tracks: 14, 15)
- Kyle Borchert – trumpet (track 12)
- Chris Gehringer – mastering
- Brent "Siddiq" Sayers – executive producer

== Charts ==
Chart (2008)	Peak position
UK Independent Albums (Official Charts)	45
US Billboard 200	5
US Top R&B/Hip-Hop Albums (Billboard)	13
US Top Rap Albums (Billboard)	6
US Independent Albums (Billboard)	2
US Top Tastemaker Albums (Billboard)	1
