= Millie Pulled a Pistol on Santa =

Single by De La Soul

from the album De La Soul Is Dead
- Released: 1991
- Recorded: 1991
- Genre: Hip-hop
- Length: 4:04
- Label: Tommy Boy
- Songwriters: P. Huston; K. Mercer; D. Jolicoeur; V. Mason
- Producers: Prince Paul; De La Soul

De La Soul singles chronology
"A Roller Skating Jam Named "Saturdays"" (1991)	"Millie Pulled a Pistol on Santa" (1991)	"Breakadawn" (1993)

"Millie Pulled a Pistol on Santa" is a song by American hip hop group De La Soul, released in 1991 by Tommy Boy Records. It was issued as a double A-side single with "Keepin' the Faith"; the two songs were released collectively as the third single from the group's second album, De La Soul Is Dead (1991).

== Background and content ==
"Millie Pulled a Pistol on Santa" is a narrative-based song, discussing a girl named Millie who is sexually abused by her father and takes revenge by murdering him while he is performing as a mall Santa. Posdnuos describes two inspirations for the song: "Millie was inspired by seeing a homeless guy in a Santa suit in the subway, but also by someone dear to me who'd been molested by her father."

== Reception ==
"Millie Pulled a Pistol on Santa" has been one of the most widely discussed tracks from De La Soul Is Dead. It has been described by AllMusic as one of "the album's most powerful moments", and by Rolling Stone as a "tour de force" that "summon[s] its power through the subtle use of metaphor". Retrospective reviews have also identified the song as one of the most prominent examples of De La Soul's exploration of darker topics on De La Soul Is Dead as compared to the group's previous work. A more negative appraisal of "Millie Pulled a Pistol on Santa" came from Entertainment Weekly, where reviewer David Browne felt that the track's efficacy was undermined by De La Soul's "mild-mannered rapping".

== Legacy ==
Producer Prince Paul would later revive one of the samples in the Full Mix of "Millie Pulled a Pistol on Santa" to use in "Mommy, What's a Gravedigga?" by Gravediggaz.

Hip-Hop duo Atmosphere recorded a sequel, titled "Millie Fell off the Fire Escape," on their free mixtape Leak at Will in 2009. In Atmosphere's song, Millie runs away after murdering her father, contemplates going back to tell the police that she killed her father because of the sexual abuse he put her through, but instead keeps running until she sees an abandoned factory. As she climbs a ladder to get into the building, the police finally catch up with her and tell her to come down. Millie slips, falls off the ladder, and dies when she hits the ground.

Another hip-hop duo Company Flow reiterated this song instrumentally to make "Suzy Pulled A Pistol on Henry" on their second and last album Little Johnny from the Hospitul: Breaks & Instrumentals Vol.1.

== Single track listing ==
1. "Millie Pulled a Pistol on Santa" (Full Mix) – 4:04
  - Engineering: Bob Power
2. "Keepin' the Faith" (Straight Pass) – 4:33
  - Guest Appearance: Vinia Mojica
3. "Keepin' the Faith" (12" UK Mix) – 7:19
  - Guest Appearance: Vinia Mojica
4. "Keepin' the Faith" (No Bass Mix) – 4:34
  - Guest Appearance: Vinia Mojica
5. "Keepin' the Faith" (LP Version) – 4:45
  - Guest Appearance: Vinia Mojica
6. "Millie Pulled a Pistol on Santa" (Full Mix Instrumental) – 4:02
  - Engineering: Bob Power
7. "Keepin' the Faith" (Straight Pass Instrumental) – 4:31
8. "Keepin' the Faith" (7" UK Mix) – 3:48
  - Guest Appearance: Vinia Mojica

== List of samples ==
- "I'll Stay" and "Mommy, What's a Funkadelic?" by Funkadelic
- "Givin' It Up Is Givin' Up" by Patrice Rushen
- "Synthetic Substitution" by Melvin Bliss

== Charts ==
Chart (1991)	Peak Position
UK Singles (OCC)	50

"Keepin' the Faith"

Chart (1991)	Peak Position
UK Dance (Music Week)	8
