= Mi Vida Local =

Studio album by Atmosphere
- Released: October 5, 2018
- Length: 49:17
- Label: Rhymesayers
- Producer: Ant

Atmosphere chronology
Fishing Blues (2016)	Mi Vida Local (2018)	Whenever (2019)

Mi Vida Local is the ninth studio album by American hip-hop group Atmosphere. It was released on October 5, 2018 by Rhymesayers Entertainment, and was supported by the lead single "Virgo", as well as an accompanying 35-date album tour with supporting acts Lioness and Dem Atlas, who are featured on the track "Drown". The second single "Jerome" was debuted the same date as the album. The album reflects on middle-aged life and features live instrumentation and 808 beats.

== Background ==
The album was announced along with a press release that stated it "reflects the ways in which the world — and their [the band's] place in it — has changed. The idyllic domesticity of the past few records has morphed into anxiety over keeping loved ones safe during turbulent times." On the same date as the announcement, the lead single "Virgo" was released along with a music video for the track directed by Jason Goldwatch and shot on Super 8mm, showing Slug rapping as he looks over rural scenes from a train.

== Critical reception ==
Professional ratings
Review scores
Source	Rating
AllMusic	3.5/5 stars
Surviving The Golden Age	8/10
Underground Hip Hop Blog	8/10

Paul Simpson of AllMusic wrote that the album follows Atmosphere's "2010s streak of albums reflecting on middle-aged life. Slug's lyrics are still generally themed around the struggles of daily existence, but these songs are a bit more preoccupied with mortality and legacy than previous outings." Simpson concluded his review by stating that "As honest and introspective as anything else Atmosphere has done, Mi Vida Local is perhaps their most mature work, as well."

Writing for Spectrum Culture, Darryl G. Wright called Mi Vida Local one of the best albums of the year.

== Track listing ==
No.	Title	Length
1.	"Jerome"	4:15
2.	"Stopwatch"	4:09
3.	"Virgo"	4:32
4.	"Delicate"	5:05
5.	"Drown" (featuring Cashinova, The Lioness and Dem Atlas)	4:31
6.	"Anymore"	4:03
7.	"Earring" (featuring Musab)	3:03
8.	"Trim"	3:32
9.	"Specificity"	2:02
10.	"Mijo"	4:07
11.	"Randy Mosh" (featuring The Dynospectrum)	5:31
12.	"Graffiti"	4:27
Total length:		49:17

== Charts ==
Chart (2018)	Peak position
US Billboard 200	129
US Independent Albums (Billboard)	7
