= Slicks Box =

Studio album by Sab the Artist
- Released: August 14, 2007
- Genre: Hip Hop
- Label: Hieroglyphics Imperium

Musab chronology
Respect the Life (2002)	Slicks Box (2007)	Sab the Artist EP (2010)

Professional ratings
Review scores
Source	Rating
Music Emissions	(4.5/5)

Slicks Box, is the first release not with Rhymesayers Entertainment by Musab Saad, formerly Beyond, and now known as Sab the Artist. The 12-track recording was released by Hieroglyphics Imperium. This release features several rock track samples, such as Toto's "Hold the Line" and Led Zeppelin's "Whole Lotta Love."

== Track listing ==
1. "Night of Mirage" – 3:08
2. "Ay-Ay (South Side Accent)" – 4:00
3. "Please Do Not Assume" – 3:25
4. "I Wont Die" – 4:09
5. "I Aint Even in the Nba!" – 1:50
6. "Hat and Shoes" – 5:03
7. "U Talking to Me?!!" – 3:55
8. "Baang!!!" – 4:14
9. "Confessions of MN. Slicks" - 4:01
10. "Family Ties" - 4:13
11. "I Gots to Get Mine" – 3:57
12. "Kool Aid (Gettoe Juice)" -5:33
