= GodLovesUgly =

Single by Atmosphere

from the album God Loves Ugly
- Released: November 19, 2002
- Genre: Rap
- Length: 3:50
- Label: Rhymesayers Entertainment, LLC
- Songwriter(s): Sean Daley, Anthony Davis
- Producer(s): Ant

"GodLovesUgly" is a single by Atmosphere, released on November 19, 2002, via 12" vinyl.

The album, God Loves Ugly, was preceded by Atmospheres's second album, Lucy Ford: The Atmosphere EPs. This album was released in 2001 and was also the only albums by Slug and Ant with external production (by El P, Jel and Moodswing 9). Atmosphere performed on three separate tours that year: the Ford Two Tour, the Who Killed The Robots Tour and the Fill In The Blanks Tour (with Mr. Dibbs).

"Godlovesugly" was released in 2002, the sixth year of Ant and Slug's collaboration. "Godlovesugly" sold over 130,000 copies in the U.S. With festivals in England, Denmark and Sweden, tours as far from home as Japan, sold out release parties coast to coast and their biggest tour to date (sixty shows in seventy-one days), Atmosphere finally had distribution to support their exhaustive touring schedule.

== Track listing ==
1. GodLovesUgly [Clean]
2. Bleed Slow (Who Cares)
3. Bones [Instrumental]
4. Shh [Instrumental]
5. Blood [Instrumental]
