= God Loves Ugly =

Studio album by Atmosphere
- Released: June 11, 2002
- Recorded: 2000–2002
- Genre: Hip-hop
- Length: 69:28
- Label: Rhymesayers Entertainment
- Producer: Ant

Atmosphere chronology
Lucy Ford: The Atmosphere EP's (2001)	God Loves Ugly (2002)	Seven's Travels (2003)

Singles from God Loves Ugly
- 1. "Modern Man's Hustle" Released: 2002; 2. "GodLovesUgly" Released: 2002

God Loves Ugly is the second studio album by American hip-hop group Atmosphere. It was released on Rhymesayers Entertainment on June 11, 2002.

== Release ==
The album, via distribution with Fat Beats, went on to sell more than 130,000 copies in the United States. The single from the album, titled "Modern Man's Hustle", reached #18 on the Billboard Hot Rap Tracks chart.

On January 20, 2009, God Loves Ugly was re-released with a bonus DVD, featuring cameos from Eyedea, Aesop Rock and Crescent Moon, among others. Originally released as Sad Clown Bad Dub 4, the DVD features two hours of live performance footage, special guest appearances, and music videos for "GodLovesUgly", "Summer Song", and "Say Shh".

== Reception and legacy ==
Professional ratings
Aggregate scores
Source	Rating
Metacritic	76/100
Review scores
Source	Rating
AllMusic	4/5 stars
Alternative Press	8/10
Blender	4/5 stars
Entertainment Weekly	B+
Kludge	8/10
Pitchfork	5.7/10 (2002); 6.6/10 (2009)
Rolling Stone	3/5 stars
The Rolling Stone Album Guide	4/5 stars
The Village Voice	A−

At Metacritic, which assigns a weighted average score out of 100 to reviews from mainstream critics, God Loves Ugly received an average score of 76% based on 9 reviews, indicating "generally favorable reviews".

In 2011, "Modern Man's Hustle" ranked at number 6 on Complex's "25 Best Rhymesayers Songs" list.

In 2015, God Loves Ugly was listed by HipHopDX as one of the "30 Best Underground Hip Hop Albums Since 2000".

== Track listing ==
No.	Title	Length
1.	"Onemosphere"	2:19
2.	"The Bass and the Movement"	4:04
3.	"Give Me"	4:02
4.	"Fuck You Lucy"	5:33
5.	"Hair"	3:23
6.	"GodLovesUgly"	3:52
7.	"A Song About a Friend"	4:28
8.	"Flesh" (featuring I Self Devine)	4:09
9.	"Saves the Day"	3:44
10.	"Lovelife"	3:35
11.	"Breathing"	3:02
12.	"Vampires"	4:19
13.	"A Girl Named Hope"	2:09
14.	"GodLovesUgly Reprise"	1:49
15.	"Modern Man's Hustle"	3:47
16.	"One of a Kind"	3:30
17.	"Blamegame"	4:50
18.	"Shrapnel"	6:53
Total length:		69:28

Deluxe edition bonus tracks
No.	Title	Length
19.	"Twomosphere"	3:28
20.	"Threemosphere"	4:16
21.	"GodLovesUgly" (Music Video)	3:54

== Personnel ==
- Ant – production
- Slug – vocals
- Mankwe Ndosi – vocal accompaniment on "GodLovesUgly" and "Shrapnel"
- George Faber – harmonica help on "Give Me"
- Sara Lindsay – vocal accompaniment on "Fuck You Lucy"
- Sara Schrantz – vocal accompaniment on "Fuck You Lucy"

== Charts ==
Chart	Peak position
Billboard 200	139
Top R&B/Hip-Hop Albums	43
