= Seven's Travels =

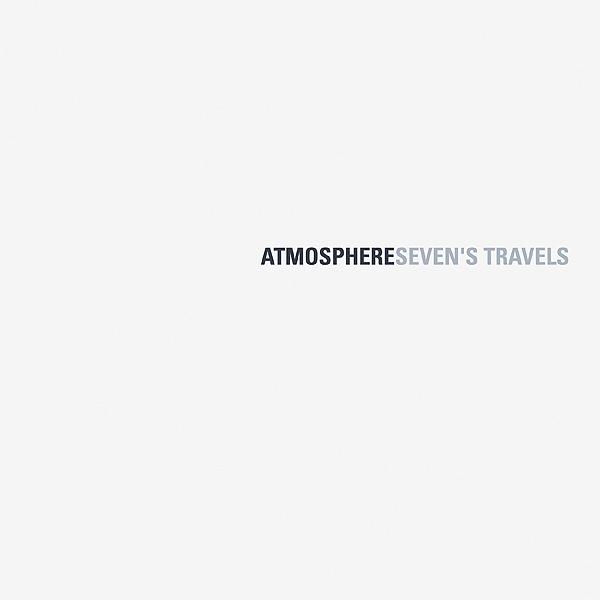

Studio album by Atmosphere
- Released: September 23, 2003
- Genre: Hip-hop
- Length: 70:31
- Label: Rhymesayers / Epitaph
- Producer: Ant

Atmosphere chronology
God Loves Ugly (2002)	Seven's Travels (2003)	You Can't Imagine How Much Fun We're Having (2005)

Alternative cover
- Original unreleased album cover. It would eventually be used for the 10th anniversary reissue.

Professional ratings
Review scores
Source	Rating
AllMusic	4/5 stars
HipHopDX	4/5 stars
RapReviews	6.5/10
Rolling Stone	3/5 stars
Stylus Magazine	B−
The Village Voice	(3-star Honorable Mention)

Seven's Travels is the third studio album by the Minneapolis hip-hop group Atmosphere, their first and only for Epitaph. It was released on September 23, 2003. "Trying to Find a Balance" and "National Disgrace" were released as singles and music videos were made for both.

== Background ==
The original cover features a naked, bare-breasted woman laying in a field. It was changed to a plain white cover resembling The White Album due to the death of Marissa Mathy-Zvaifler, a 16-year-old girl who was murdered by a janitor during an Atmosphere show in Albuquerque, NM on July 16, 2003. The janitor, convicted child sex offender Dominic Akers, had led the girl backstage, claiming he would allow her to meet vocalist Sean Daley (aka Slug). Slug dedicates the album to Zvaifler in the liner notes, and later wrote about the incident and his reaction in a song entitled "That Night, which appears on the 2005 album You Can't Imagine How Much Fun We're Having. Slug would later describe the song as one he "wasn't supposed to write" and marks the 2005 album as a whole as a beginning point of Slug's more positive storytelling in his music.

== Release ==
On December 10, 2013, 3,000 limited edition vinyl pressings were released in celebration of the album's tenth anniversary. It uses the album's original cover art and contains bonus tracks.

== Track listing ==
All songs are produced by Ant.

No.	Title	Length
1.	"History"	1:24
2.	"Trying to Find a Balance"	4:17
3.	"Bird Sings Why the Caged I Know"	2:55
4.	"Reflections"	4:19
5.	"Gotta Lotta Walls"	4:46
6.	"The Keys to Life vs. 15 Minutes of Fame"	2:38
7.	"Apple"	1:59
8.	"Suicidegirls"	2:40
9.	"Jason"	0:47
10.	"Cats Van Bags" (featuring Brother Ali)	4:01
11.	"Los Angeles"	2:14
12.	"Lifter Puller"	6:18
13.	"Shoes"	3:01
14.	"National Disgrace"	5:02
15.	"Denvemolorado"	3:11
16.	"Liquor Lyles Cool July"	2:24
17.	"Good Times (Sick Pimpin')"	4:56
18.	"In My Continental"	4:28
19.	"Always Coming Back Home to You"	4:02
20.	"Say Shh..." (Hidden track)	5:09
Total length:		70:31

10th Anniversary bonus tracks
No.	Title	Length
21.	"DMFD"	1:45
22.	"On the Battlefield"	0:45
23.	"Quiet Pimpin'"	1:05
24.	"My Songs"	5:18
25.	"A Song We Made with Sage" (featuring Sage Francis)	5:18
26.	"Knock Knock Joke 2"	2:45
27.	"Masters of War (Reinterpretation)"	3:23

== Personnel ==
- Slug – vocals
- Nate "the Guitar Man" Collis – additional guitar on "Trying to Find a Balance" and "Always Coming Back Home to You"
- Cameron H., Kristin B., and Nate the Merchant – additional vocals on "Bird Sings Why the Caged I Know"
- Tasha Baron – additional rhodes on "Gotta Lotta Walls" and "Good Times (Sick Pimpin')"
- Anthony D. – additional vocals on "Gotta Lotta Walls"
- Sara, Katie and others – additional vocals on "Suicidegirls"
- Jason Cook – additional vocals on "Jason"
- Brother Ali – guest vocals on "Cats Van Bags"
- Sara Lindsay, Sage Francis – additional vocals on "Lifter Puller"
- Nate Collis – additional jawharp on "Shoes" and "National Disgrace"
- Crescent Moon and Advizor – additional vocals on "Liquor Lyles Cool July"
- I Self Devine – additional vocals on "In My Continental"
