= Overcast! (album) =

Studio album by Atmosphere
- Released: August 5, 1997
- Recorded: 1996–1997
- Genre: Hip-hop
- Length: 72:40
- Label: Rhymesayers Entertainment
- Producer: Ant

Atmosphere chronology
Overcast! (1997)	Overcast! (1997)	Headshots: Se7en (1999)

Remaster cover
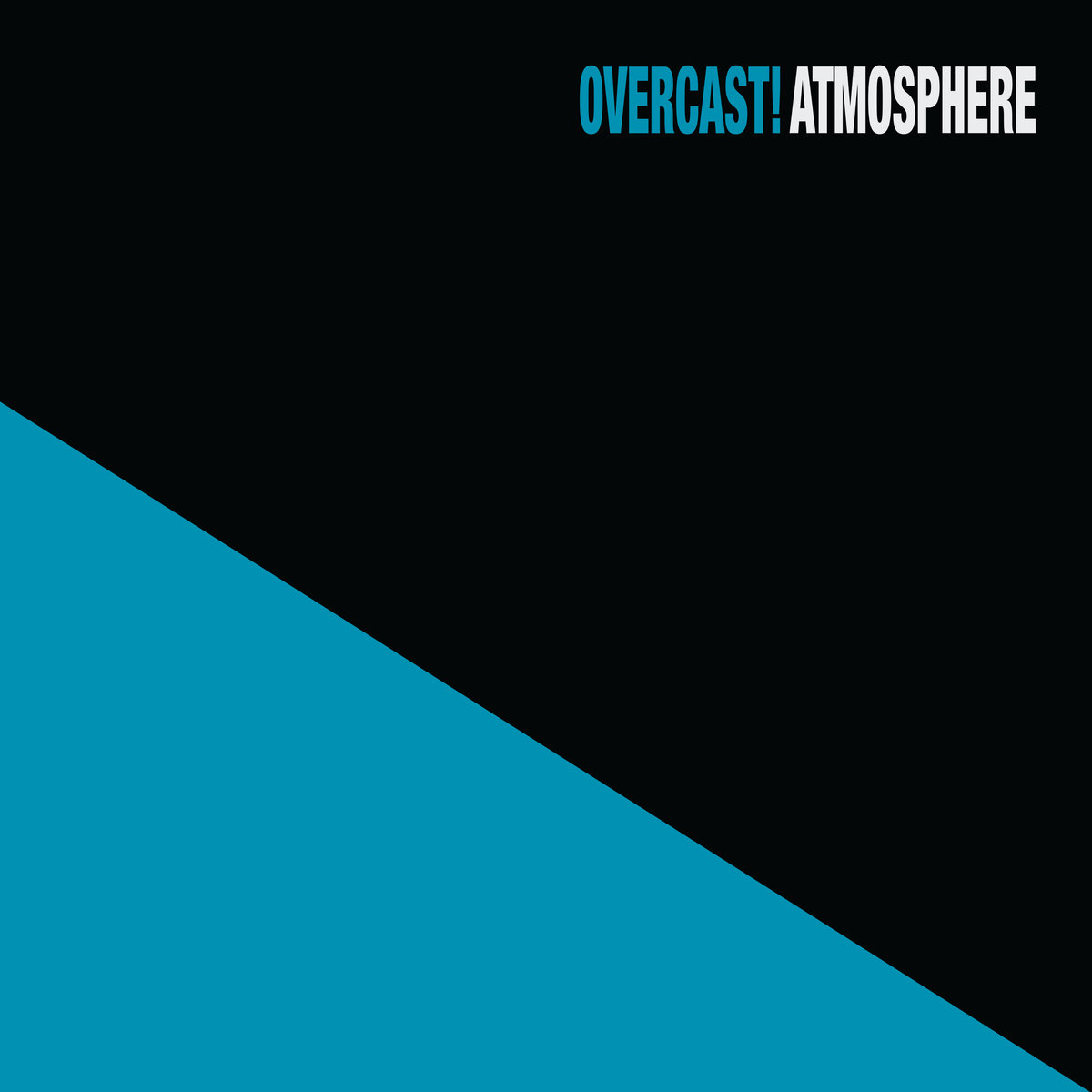

Professional ratings
Review scores
Source	Rating
AllMusic	3/5 stars
RapReviews	(9.5/10)

Overcast! is the debut studio album by Minneapolis hip-hop group Atmosphere, released on August 5, 1997, on Rhymesayers Entertainment. It is the only Atmosphere album to feature MC Spawn trading verses with Slug. Before the album's release, Spawn left the group due to conflicting motives.

== Development ==
The cover art is inspired by that of Judgment!, released in 1964 by jazz pianist Andrew Hill. The album contains several tracks featured on Overcast! (EP), however notably absent is "God's Bathroom Floor".

== Releases ==
The album was remastered and re-released in 2017 with new artwork and bonus tracks.

== Track listing ==
- All songs produced by Ant.

No.	Title	Length
1.	"1597"	3:04
2.	"Brief Description"	4:16
3.	"Current Status" (featuring Beyond)	3:40
4.	"Complications"	5:04
5.	"4:30 am"	3:10
6.	"Adjust" (featuring Beyond)	4:44
7.	"Clay"	3:48
8.	"@"	2:17
9.	"Sound Is Vibration"	3:57
10.	"Multiples"	4:13
11.	"Scapegoat"	3:52
12.	"Ode to the Modern Man (Lightning Blend)"	4:01
13.	"WND"	3:08
14.	"Multiples (Reprise)"	1:48
15.	"Caved In"	3:44
16.	"Cuando Limpia El Humo"	5:12
17.	"The Outernet"	5:22
18.	"Untitled"	7:16

=== 2017 remaster bonus tracks ===
Bonus tracks
No.	Title	Length
1.	"Broken Rewind Button (feat. Beyond)"	4:22
2.	"Bus Benches"	2:02
3.	"Pea King"	3:49
