= To All My Friends, Blood Makes the Blade Holy: The Atmosphere EP's =

EP by Atmosphere
- Released: September 7, 2010
- Genre: Hip-hop
- Length: 40:45
- Label: Rhymesayers Entertainment
- Producer: Atmosphere

Atmosphere chronology
Leak at Will (2009)	To All My Friends, Blood Makes the Blade Holy: The Atmosphere EP's (2010)	The Family Sign (2011)

Professional ratings
Review scores
Source	Rating
AllMusic	3.5/5 stars
HipHopDX	4.0/5
Pitchfork	7.3/10

To All My Friends, Blood Makes the Blade Holy: The Atmosphere EP's is a double EP by American hip-hop group Atmosphere. It was released on Rhymesayers Entertainment on September 7, 2010.

== Commercial performance ==
It debuted at number 38 on the Billboard 200 selling 9,400 copies in its first week.

== Track listing ==
No.	Title	Length
1.	"Until the Nipple's Gone"	4:20
2.	"The Major Leagues"	3:21
3.	"Scalp"	3:24
4.	"The Best Day"	3:37
5.	"Americareful"	3:18
6.	"Hope"	1:56
7.	"The Loser Wins"	3:36
8.	"Shotgun"	4:10
9.	"Commodities"	2:42
10.	"The Number None"	3:01
11.	"Freefallin'"	4:10
12.	"To All My Friends"	3:17
Total length:		40:52

== Charts ==
Chart	Peak position
Billboard 200	38
Independent Albums	5
Top R&B/Hip-Hop Albums	9
Rap Albums	4
Digital Albums	9
