= Fishing Blues (album) =

Studio album by Atmosphere
- Released: August 12, 2016
- Genre: Hip-hop
- Length: 1:08:04
- Label: Rhymesayers Entertainment
- Producer: Ant

Atmosphere chronology
Southsiders (2014)	Fishing Blues (2016)	Mi Vida Local (2018)

Fishing Blues is the eighth studio album by American hip-hop duo Atmosphere. It was released on August 12, 2016, via Rhymesayers Entertainment. Produced by Ant, the album features guest appearances from Aesop Rock, Dem Atlas, I.B.E, Kim Manning, Kool Keith, MF Doom, the Grouch, and Eric Mayson.

In the United States, the album debuted at number 22 on the Billboard 200, number 2 on the Top R&B/Hip-Hop Albums and number-one on the Independent Albums charts with 15,000 units sold in its first-week.

== Critical reception ==
Professional ratings
Aggregate scores
Source	Rating
Metacritic	71/100
Review scores
Source	Rating
AllMusic	3.5/5 stars
The A.V. Club	B+
Consequence of Sound	B
Exclaim!	8/10
Flood Magazine	5/10
HipHopDX	3.5/5
Noisey	(3-star Honorable Mention)
Pitchfork	5.6/10
Spin	4/10
Sputnikmusic	3/5

Fishing Blues was met with generally favorable reviews from music critics. At Metacritic, which assigns a normalized rating out of 100 to reviews from mainstream publications, the album received an average score of 71 based on seven reviews.

Dan Caffrey of The A.V. Club praised the album, stating: "overall, this is undeniable rap therapy. Like the rest of us, Slug and Ant are just trying to get by, and for the most part, they're succeeding". Kyle Mullin of Exclaim! concluded: "between Ant's eclectic, subtle production and Slug's equally nuanced lyricism, Fishing Blues stands out as one of the best hip-hop LPs of the year thus far". Kyle Eustice of Consequence wrote: "along with Ant's confident production work, there's a sense Slug is finally comfortable with the man he's become, what he's accomplished and where he's going". AllMusic's David Jeffries found the album "isn't so much an indie version of The Heist as it is a more satisfied and slow version of Southsiders. Check that one first, then come back here for a relaxed alternative". Marcel Williams of HipHopDX wrote: "Fishing Blues may not be your bag due to its pacing and down-trodden tempo but in between the suburban man bars should lay some appreciation for storytelling".

In mixed reviews, Sheldon Pearce of Pitchfork stated: "Fishing Blues' saving grace, the only song with any real passion and continuity, is one about police brutality written from the perspective of the officer". Dan Weiss of Spin found "the new Fishing Blues feels so rote you'll have to play the old records to remember that it's not the Atmosphere norm".

== Track listing ==
No.	Title	Length
1.	"Like a Fire"	3:29
2.	"Ringo"	3:51
3.	"Besos"	3:45
4.	"Pure Evil" (featuring I.B.E)	3:19
5.	"Perfect"	3:36
6.	"Seismic Waves" (featuring Eric Mayson)	3:57
7.	"Next to You" (featuring Dem Atlas)	4:18
8.	"The Shit That We've Been Through"	3:34
9.	"When the Lights Go Out" (featuring MF Doom and Kool Keith)	4:41
10.	"No Biggie"	2:35
11.	"Everything"	3:38
12.	"Chasing New York" (featuring Aesop Rock)	3:24
13.	"Sugar"	3:56
14.	"Fishing Blues" (featuring The Grouch)	3:40
15.	"Won't Look Back" (featuring Kim Manning)	4:34
16.	"Anybody That I've Known"	4:33
17.	"Still Be Here"	3:57
18.	"A Long Hello"	3:17
Total length:		1:08:04

== Charts ==
Chart performance for Fishing Blues
Chart (2016)	Peak position
Belgian Albums (Ultratop Flanders)	175
Swiss Albums (Schweizer Hitparade)	97
UK R&B Albums (Official Charts)	36
UK Independent Albums (Official Charts)	36
US Billboard 200	22
US Top R&B/Hip-Hop Albums (Billboard)	2
US Independent Albums (Billboard)	1
