= You Can't Imagine How Much Fun We're Having =

Studio album by Atmosphere
- Released: October 4, 2005
- Genre: Hip-hop
- Length: 50:55
- Label: Rhymesayers Entertainment
- Producer: Ant

Atmosphere chronology
Seven's Travels (2003)	You Can't Imagine How Much Fun We're Having (2005)	When Life Gives You Lemons, You Paint That Shit Gold (2008)

Singles from You Can't Imagine How Much Fun We're Having
- 1. "Watch Out" Released: 2005; 2. "Say Hey There" Released: 2006

Professional ratings
Aggregate scores
Source	Rating
Metacritic	77/100
Review scores
Source	Rating
AllMusic	4/5 stars
The A.V. Club	favorable
Robert Christgau	(2-star Honorable Mention)
HipHopDX	5/5
Okayplayer	5/5 stars
Pitchfork	5.9/10
PopMatters	7/10 stars
Spin	favorable
Stylus Magazine	C
Tiny Mix Tapes	2.5/5 stars

You Can't Imagine How Much Fun We're Having is the fourth studio album by American hip-hop duo Atmosphere. It was released through Rhymesayers Entertainment in 2005.

In 2015, it was re-released as the 10-year anniversary vinyl edition.

== Reception ==
At Metacritic, which assigns a weighted average score out of 100 to reviews from mainstream critics, the album received an average score of 77% based on 15 reviews, indicating "generally favorable reviews".

The album was ranked by Hip Hop Golden Age as the fourth best hip-hop album of 2005.

== Track listing ==
No.	Title	Length
1.	"The Arrival"	4:27
2.	"Panic Attack"	4:37
3.	"Watch Out"	4:14
4.	"Musical Chairs"	3:52
5.	"Say Hey There"	4:29
6.	"Hockey Hair"	2:53
7.	"Bam"	2:14
8.	"Pour Me Another"	4:49
9.	"Smart Went Crazy"	3:38
10.	"Angelface"	4:00
11.	"That Night"	2:43
12.	"Get Fly"	4:45
13.	"Little Man"	4:14
Total length:		50:55

Limited edition bonus disc
No.	Title	Artist(s)	Length
1.	"Rain Water"	Brother Ali	6:09
2.	"Boom Box"	Blueprint	4:55
3.	"Prom Quiz"	Grayskul	3:09
4.	"Wyle Out"	Boom Bap Project	3:44
5.	"Deep Fried Frenz"	MF Doom	3:37
6.	"Dirty Girl"	Felt	3:45
7.	"P.O.S Is Ruining My Life"	P.O.S	3:17
8.	"Overthrow / They Call It"	I Self Devine / Atmosphere	10:29

== Charts ==
Chart	Peak position
Billboard 200	66
Independent Albums	1
Top R&B/Hip-Hop Albums	55
