= The Family Sign =

Studio album by Atmosphere
- Released: April 12, 2011
- Genre: Hip-hop
- Length: 51:06
- Label: Rhymesayers Entertainment
- Producer: Ant

Atmosphere chronology
To All My Friends, Blood Makes the Blade Holy: The Atmosphere EP's (2010)	The Family Sign (2011)	Southsiders (2014)

Professional ratings
Aggregate scores
Source	Rating
Metacritic	73/100
Review scores
Source	Rating
AllMusic	3.5/5 stars
BBC	favorable
Consequence of Sound	C+
HipHopDX	4.0/5
Pitchfork	5.8/10
Slant Magazine	2.5/5 stars

The Family Sign is the sixth studio album by American hip-hop group Atmosphere. It was released on Rhymesayers Entertainment on April 12, 2011. The album debuted at number 13 on the Billboard 200 selling 28,000 copies in its first week.

== Reception ==
At Metacritic, which assigns a weighted average score out of 100 to reviews from mainstream critics, The Family Sign received an average score of 73% based on 20 reviews, indicating "generally favorable reviews".

Commenting on Slug's writing on The Family Sign for College Magazine, Taylor Jaymes wrote that he "is as much a rapper as he is a poet."

== Track listing ==
No.	Title	Length
1.	"My Key"	4:20
2.	"The Last to Say"	4:16
3.	"Became"	4:45
4.	"Just for Show"	3:39
5.	"She's Enough"	3:19
6.	"Bad Bad Daddy"	3:33
7.	"Millennium Dodo"	3:21
8.	"Who I'll Never Be"	3:08
9.	"I Don't Need Brighter Days"	4:05
10.	"Ain't Nobody"	3:17
11.	"Your Name Here"	3:37
12.	"If You Can Save Me Now"	3:52
13.	"Something So"	3:41
14.	"My Notes"	2:18
15.	"Millennium Dodo 2" (iTunes deluxe edition bonus track)	3:56
16.	"Cut You Down" (iTunes deluxe edition bonus track)	4:14
Total length:		59:21

== Personnel ==
- Slug – Vocals
- Ant – Production
- Nate Collis – Guitar
- Erick Anderson – Keyboards

== Charts ==
=== Weekly charts ===
Chart (2011)	Peak position
US Billboard 200	13
US Independent Albums (Billboard)	2
US Top R&B/Hip-Hop Albums (Billboard)	3

=== Year-end charts ===
Chart (2011)	Position
US Top R&B/Hip-Hop Albums (Billboard)	88
