= Southsiders (album) =

Studio album by Atmosphere
- Released: May 6, 2014
- Studio: Stophouse Studios (Minneapolis, MN); Fuzz Deluxxe (Oakland, CA)
- Genre: Hip-hop
- Length: 59:41
- Label: Rhymesayers
- Producer: Ant

Atmosphere chronology
The Family Sign (2011)	Southsiders (2014)	Fishing Blues (2016)

Southsiders is the seventh studio album by American hip hop duo Atmosphere. The album was released on May 6, 2014, via Rhymesayers Entertainment. Its title refers to the south side of Minneapolis.

The album debuted at number eight on the Billboard 200, number three on the Top R&B/Hip-Hop Albums and number two on the Top Rap Albums, Independent Albums and Vinyl Albums charts, with first-week sales of 23,159 copies in the United States.

== Critical reception ==
Professional ratings
Aggregate scores
Source	Rating
AnyDecentMusic?	5.4/10
Metacritic	70/100
Review scores
Source	Rating
AllMusic	4/5 stars
Robert Christgau	A−
Consequence of Sound	C+
Exclaim!	7/10
The 405	7/10
HipHopDX	3.5/5
Pitchfork	6.3/10
RapReviews	7/10
Spectrum Culture	3/5
XXL	4/5

Southsiders was met with generally favorable reviews from music critics. At Metacritic, which assigns a normalized rating out of 100 to reviews from mainstream publications, the album received an average score of 70 based on nine reviews. The aggregator AnyDecentMusic? has the critical consensus of the album at a 5.4 out of 10, based on seven reviews.

AllMusic's David Jeffries praised the album, stating: "growth and groundation are skillfully balanced on Southsiders, this is arguably the most deep and different album in the band's discography". Dan Rys of XXL wrote: "Atmosphere has never been afraid to bare everything, strip things down to their most honest form, and grow with their listeners. Southsiders is the next step in that lineage, and one that falls directly in line with their previous work".

Mark Bozzer of Exclaim! wrote: "it's a tried, tested and true formula that has allowed these two humble cats from the land where Kirby Puckett smacked homers to do this for so long". Homer Johnsen of HipHopDX called it "a solid album", resuming "the production is consistent and there are moments of enlightenment from Slug. But due to Atmosphere's already extensive catalog, it doesn’t easily separate itself from previous works". Patrick Taylor of RapReviews found "it's lines like [in "Flicker" that] keep me coming back to Atmosphere's music, and make Southsiders another solid entry into the Atmosphere catalogue, warts and all". Nicholas Glover of The 405 called it "extremely competent, and has enough really great beats to more than make up for the general air of insouciance. It's good. It just ain't essential".

Jayson Greene of Pitchfork concluded: "for the first time in Atmosphere's long career, the stakes feel low, and Southsiders feels both pleasant and noncommittal, like it isn't even convinced of its own right to exist".

In his mixed review for Consequence, Will Hagle called it "an Atmosphere album, which means that it is going to be better than many hip-hop releases this year, but it’s also exactly what you’d expect from the artists and has moments that feel outdated".

== Track listing ==
No.	Title	Length
1.	"Camera Thief"	4:45
2.	"Arthur's Song"	3:21
3.	"The World Might Not Live Through the Night"	4:14
4.	"Star-Shaped Heart"	3:18
5.	"I Love You Like a Brother"	3:31
6.	"Southsiders"	3:12
7.	"Bitter"	4:19
8.	"Mrs. Interpret"	3:47
9.	"Fortunate"	3:36
10.	"Kanye West"	4:01
11.	"We Ain't Gonna Die Today"	3:44
12.	"My Lady Got Two Men"	4:21
13.	"Flicker"	4:45
14.	"January on Lake Street"	4:03
15.	"Let Me Know That You Know What You Want to Know"	4:44
Total length:		59:41

Deluxe version bonus tracks
No.	Title	Length
16.	"She Don't Know Why She Love It"	4:06
17.	"Hell"	3:37
18.	"I Don't Need No Fancy Shit"	3:07
19.	"Idiot"	3:56
20.	"Prelude to Hell"	2:51

== Chart positions ==
=== Weekly charts ===
Chart (2014)	Peak position
UK R&B Albums (OCC)	33
US Billboard 200	8
US Top R&B/Hip-Hop Albums (Billboard)	3
US Top Rap Albums (Billboard)	2
US Independent Albums (Billboard)	2
US Vinyl Albums (Billboard)	2

=== Year-end charts ===
Chart (2014)	Position
US Top R&B/Hip-Hop Albums (Billboard)	77
