= Dem Atlas =

American rapper (born 1992)

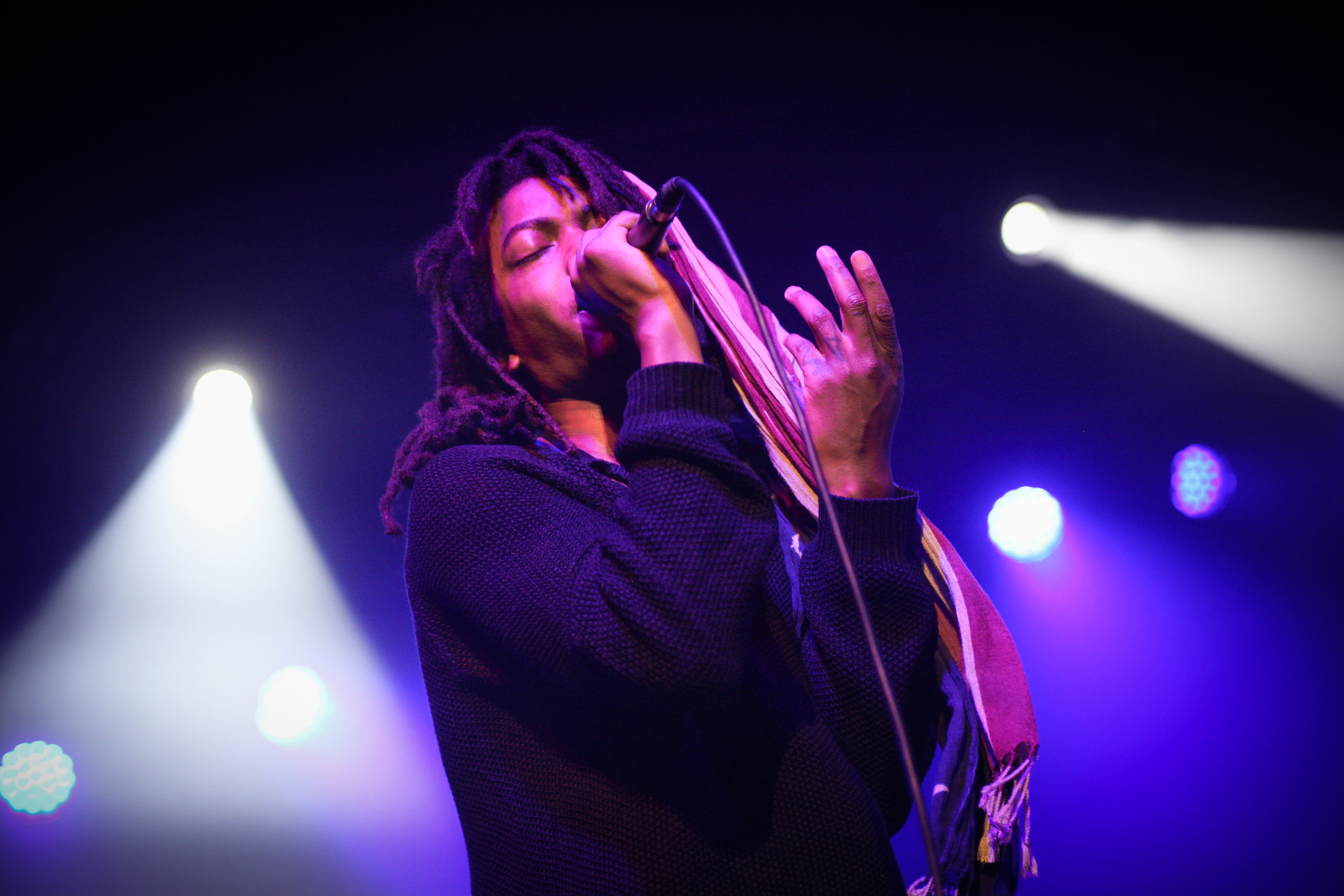
- Dem Atlas in 2019

Background information
- Born: Joshua Evans Turner; May 31, 1992 (age 34); Akron, Ohio, U.S.
- Origin: Saint Paul, Minnesota, U.S.
- Genre: Hip hop
- Occupation: Rapper
- Years active: 2010–present
- Label: Rhymesayers Entertainment
- Website: dematlas.bandcamp.com

Joshua Evans Turner (born May 31, 1992), better known by his stage name Dem Atlas (often stylized as deM atlaS), is an American rapper from Saint Paul, Minnesota. He was formerly a member of the group Sifu Hotman alongside rapper Guante and producer Rube. He was formerly signed to Rhymesayers Entertainment.

== Early life ==
Born in Akron, Ohio, Turner moved to Minneapolis at age 4. He attended Eagan High School.

== Music career ==
In 2013, Dem Atlas self-released his debut EP, Charle Brwn. During 2013, Dem Atlas signed to Rhymesayers Entertainment and they re-released the Charle Brwn EP on their own imprint. After signing to the label, Dem Atlas joined label mate Greives' Running Wild Tour. In 2014 he released the Dwnr EP to critical acclaim. Pitchfork included it on the "Best MN Hip-Hop Releases of 2014" list.

After releasing the EP Dem Atlas joined Atmosphere's summer tour and joined Joey Bada$$ on tour to promote the EP. While touring in 2014, Sifu Hotman, his collaborative project with Guante and Rube, released a studio album, Embrace the Sun. Dem Atlas spent the entirety of 2015 on the road touring the US and released a single, "With a Smile". The Village Voice included him on the "Five Rap Artists to Watch For in 2015" list. In 2016, he released a mixtape, MF Dem, which became an instant cult classic and featured 13 previously released instrumentals from MF Doom. During 2016 and 2017, Dem Atlas, served as opener from Atmosphere's Freshwater Fly Fisherman and Welcome To Colorado tours. In 2018, he released his debut solo studio album, Bad Actress. He then performed at Soundset 2018 and spent the rest of 2018 on the road touring in support of Bad Actress. Dem Atlas spent the entirety of 2019 on the road touring both the US and Europe.

In 2020, Rhymesayers was accused of racism and sexual abuse stemming from within the organization. Rhymesayers ended its working relationship with Dem Atlas, following allegations of sexual misconduct and abuse. deM atlaS refuted the claims by providing both a written and video testimony. There was no formal investigation and no charges were ever filed. In 2021, Dem Atlas signed a management deal with San Francisco Supply. After a year under contract, deM atlaS and San Francisco Supply parted ways. On November 12, 2021, deM atlaS self-released the redeMption EP. Today, deM atlaS continues to do his music, working on a follow-up project to redeMption.

== Style and influences ==
In a 2015 interview with Star Tribune, Dem Atlas stated that his influences range from Pharcyde to Nas, Minor Threat, Bad Brains, Louis Armstrong, and Billie Holiday.

== Discography ==
=== Studio albums ===
- Embrace the Sun (2014) (with Guante and Rube, as Sifu Hotman)
- Bad Actress (2018)
- FANTASY PKWY (2024)

=== Mixtapes ===
- MF Dem (2016)

=== EPs ===
- Charle Brwn (2013)
- Sifu Hotman (2013) (with Guante and Rube, as Sifu Hotman)
- Dwnr (2014)
- redeMption (2021)

=== Singles ===
- "All We Got" (2014)
- "With a Smile" (2015)
- "In the Mud" (2017)
- "Bad Days Are Over" (2019)
- "Retribution" (2021)

=== Guest appearances ===
- Irenic - "Angels Lose Their Way" from Wisdom Teeth: The Art of Pulling Roots (2012)
- Beasthead - "Different Son" from Tallest Trees (2013)
- Atmosphere - "Color in the Snow" (2013)
- Antioch - "Prozac Daytrips" from King of the Forest (2014)
- Christopher Michael Jensen - "Psychosis" from CM Cool J (2014)
- Atmosphere - "Finer Things" (2015)
- Andre Mariette - "Beer vs. Champagne" from Cloud 8.9 (2015)
- Doze - "Nice Guys Finish Last" from Pay Dues Forever (2015)
- Atmosphere - "Next to You" from Fishing Blues (2016)
- Onry Ozzborn - "Figure It Out" from Duo (2016)
- Brother Ali - "Special Effects" from All the Beauty in This Whole Life (2017)
- YYY - "Wouldn't It Be Nice" from A Tribute to the Beach Boys' Pet Sounds (2017)
- Lady Midnight - "Slide" from Midnight Special Vol. 2: Countdown 2 Sunrise (2018)
- Ultra Suede - "Selfish" from Ultra Suede (2018)
- Atmosphere - "Drown" from Mi Vida Local (2018)
