= Muja Messiah =

American singer

- Born: Robert Hedges; December 10, 1976 (age 49)
- Origin: Minneapolis, Minnesota, U.S.
- Genres: Hip-hop, R&B
- Occupation: Singer, Rapper
- Years active: 2000–present
- Labels: Sound Verite Records; Black Corners

Robert Hedges (born December 10, 1976), better known by his stage name Muja Messiah, is an American rapper from Minneapolis, Minnesota. He has been a member of the groups Raw Villa and Villa Rosa. Vibe named him in "51 Best MySpace Rappers" and URB named him in "Next 1000." City Pages also named him the best Minneapolis hip-hop artist of 2009.

== Career ==
In 2008, Muja Messiah released a mixtape, Mpls Massacre Vol. 1, and then released his debut album Thee Adventures of a B-Boy D-Boy the same year.

Two years later in 2010, he released the album M-16's.

In 2014, he released God Kissed It the Devil Missed It. It was listed as one of the best Minnesota rap album of 2014 by City Pages.

The next year in 2015, he released the album Angel Blood Soup and the collaborative album 9th House with I Self Devine.

On December 7, 2020, emcee, rapper and actor Ice-T retweeted the Muja Messiah song "Covid" produced by Orikal Uno to his 1.9 million followers on Twitter

== Discography ==
=== Studio albums ===
- Thee Adventures of a B-Boy D-Boy (2008)
- M-16's (2010)
- God Kissed It the Devil Missed It (2014)
- Angel Blood Soup (2015)
- 9th House (2015) (with I Self Devine)
- Lucky Bastard (2019)
- Cooler Heads Prevail (2022)
- Eleutheria (2023)
- Trap Water (2023)
- The Grinch (2023)
- GODNA (2025)

=== Mixtapes ===
- MPLS Massace Vol. 1 (2008)

=== EPs ===
- Wutz Going Down? (2001)
- Saran Rap (2017) Produced by Roc Marciano

=== Guest Appearances ===
- Atmosphere – "Dearly Bloved" from Whenever (2019)
