= Sab the Artist =

American rapper

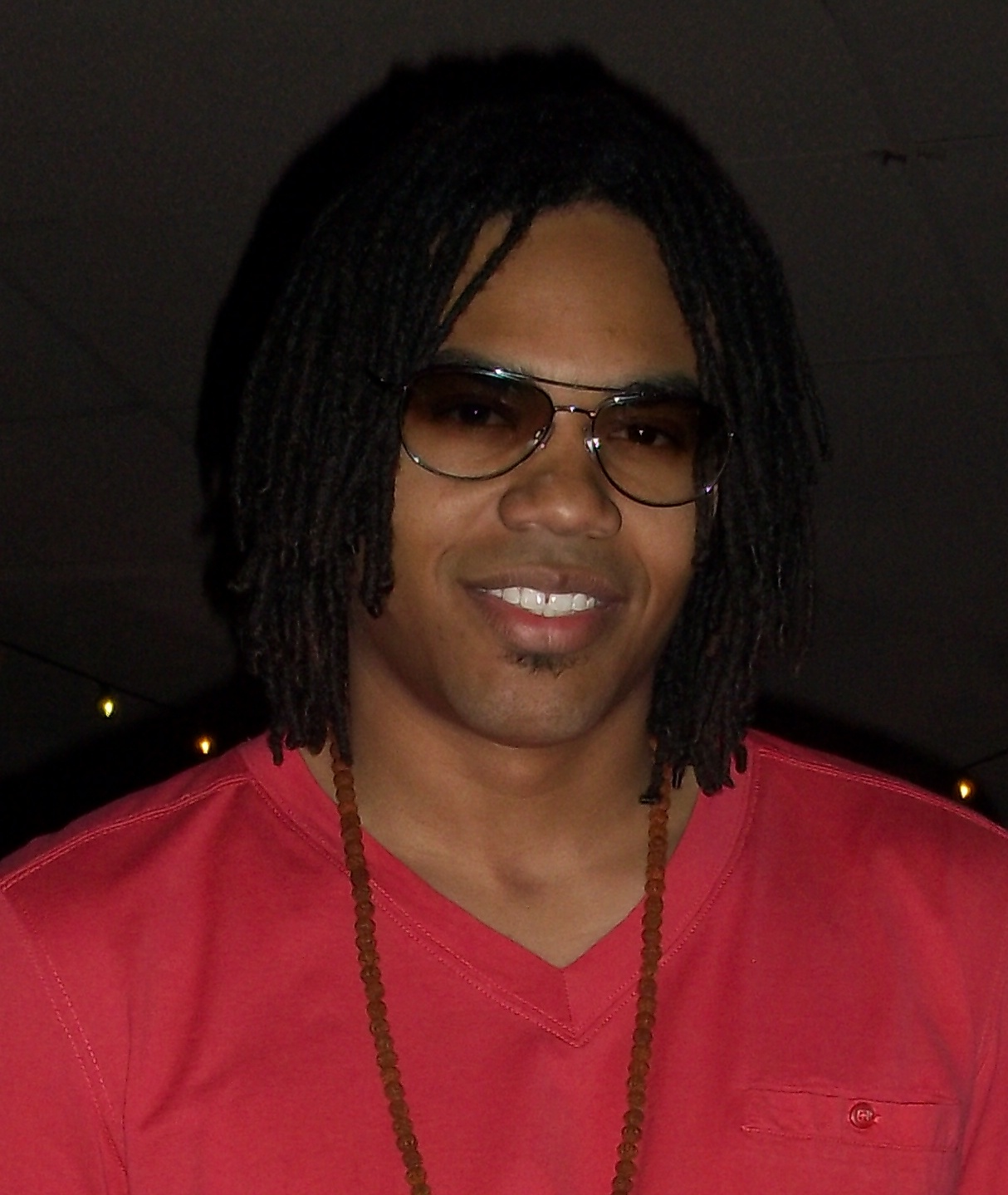
- Sab in 2010

Background information
- Also known as: Beyond, Musab, SAB, Minnesota Slicks, General Woundwart
- Born: Musab Saad; September 23, 1975 (age 51)
- Genres: Hip-hop, pop, R&B
- Occupations: Rapper, singer-songwriter, record producer
- Years active: 1996–present
- Labels: Rhymesayers Entertainment, Hieroglyphics Imperium Recordings
- Website: sabmusic.bandcamp.com

Musab Saad, (born September 23, 1975) better known by his stage name Sab the Artist, Musab, or Beyond, is an American recording artist, rapper, songwriter, record producer, and music executive from Minneapolis, Minnesota. He is currently based in Las Vegas, Nevada.

== Career ==
Known first by the moniker Beyond and later as Musab, Sab the Artist was a member of the Headshots crew before he, along with Slug (Sean Daley), Ant (Anthony Davis) and Siddiq (Brent Sayers), founded indie hip-hop label Rhymesayers Entertainment. In 1996, Beyond had the label's very first release Comparison. In 1999, he released Be-Sides. Dynospectrum's self-titled debut album was also released that year. In 2002, Respect the Life, his first studio album as Musab, was released on Rhymesayers.

The 2007 album Slicks Box was Sab's first official project not released by Rhymesayers, instead coming on Oakland-based Hieroglyphics Imperium Recordings.

Long known as a hip-hop artist, Sab's recent projects—including his 2010 EP Sab the Artist and the full-length album H.G.H. (Heaven, Girls, Hell) he worked with Ultra Chorus of Minneapolis—are instead a fusion of "Hip Hop, Pop, R&B, and Electronic sounds".

== Discography ==
=== Albums ===
- Comparison (1996) (as Beyond)
- Dynospectrum (1999) (with Dynospectrum as General Woundwart)
- Be-Sides (1999) (as Beyond)
- Respect the Life (2002) (as Musab)
- Slicks Box (2007) (as Sab the Artist)
- Love Is in the Air (2011) (as Sab the Artist)
- HGH (Heaven, Girls, Hell) (2012) (as Sab the Artist with Ultra Chorus)
- Deconstruction (2020) (as MInk with Ink Well)

=== EPs ===
- Actin' Rich (1999) (as Musab)
- Sab the Artist EP (2010)
- The Awful Truth (2012) (as Musab with Abstract Rude)

=== Guest appearances ===
- Atmosphere – "Current Status" and "Adjust" from Overcast! (1997)
- Atmosphere - "Dungeons and Dragons" (1999) from "Headshots: Se7en"
- The Planets – "Global" from The Opening (2002)
- Atmosphere – "Flesh (Remix)" (2002)
- Atmosphere – "Southsiders Remix" (2014)
- Atmosphere – "Earring" from Mi Vida Local (2018)
- Atmosphere – "Dearly Bloved" from Whenever (2019)
- Atmosphere - "Strung" from Word? (2021)
