= Lucy Ford: The Atmosphere EP's =

Compilation album by Atmosphere
- Released: February 1, 2001
- Genres: Alternative hip-hop; conscious hip-hop
- Length: 69:46
- Labels: Rhymesayers Entertainment; Fat Beats
- Producers: Ant; Jel; Moodswing9; El-P

Atmosphere chronology
Headshots: Se7en (1999)	Lucy Ford: The Atmosphere EP's (2001)	God Loves Ugly (2002)

Lucy Ford: The Atmosphere EP's is a compilation album by the Minneapolis hip-hop group Atmosphere. It was released on Rhymesayers Entertainment in 2001. The album collects the previously released EPs, Ford One, Ford Two, and The Lucy EP.

== Recording ==
Some of the sessions were produced at the home studio of Jason Heinrichs, also known as Anomaly. In an obituary for Heinrichs in 2022, Slug described the recordings: "It was the first time we’d seen anyone use a computer and grid to record and sequence music. He supplied the sound effect of the squealing pig on one of our songs ("Nothing But Sunshine") and we laughed for a long time."

== Reception ==
Professional ratings
Review scores
Source	Rating
AllMusic	4/5 stars
Pitchfork	7.3/10
RapReviews	8/10
The Rolling Stone Album Guide	4.5/5 stars
Spin	7/10
The Village Voice	A−

Stanton Swihart of AllMusic gave the album 4 stars out of 5, commenting that "its stronger moments are among the most forward-thinking hip-hop ever made." Nathan Rabin of The A.V. Club wrote, "The beer-soaked ennui of the hip-hop depressive hasn't been captured this evocatively since before Basehead found Jesus".

In 2015, it was ranked at number 14 on Fact's "100 Best Indie Hip-Hop Records of All Time" list.

== Track listing ==
All songs produced by Ant, unless otherwise noted.

No.	Title	Producer(s)	Length
1.	"Between the Lines"		5:19
2.	"Like Today"		4:02
3.	"Tears for the Sheep"		2:51
4.	"Guns and Cigarettes"		4:21
5.	"Don't Ever Fucking Question That"		4:17
6.	"It Goes"		4:27
7.	"If I Was Santa Claus"		3:50
8.	"Aspiring Sociopath"		5:24
9.	"Free or Dead"	Jel	4:46
10.	"Party for the Fight to Write"		3:53
11.	"Mama Had a Baby and His Head Popped Off"		4:24
12.	"They're All Gonna Laugh @ You"	Jel	2:04
13.	"Lost and Found"	Jel	4:39
14.	"The Woman with the Tattooed Hands"		3:30
15.	"Nothing but Sunshine"	Moodswing9	5:10
16.	"Homecoming" (hidden track; featuring El-P)	El-P	4:38
