= Whenever (Atmosphere album) =

Studio album by Atmosphere
- Released: December 13, 2019
- Genre: Hip-hop
- Length: 42:51
- Label: Rhymesayers Entertainment
- Producer: Ant

Atmosphere chronology
Mi Vida Local (2018)	Whenever (2019)	The Day Before Halloween (2020)

Singles from Whenever
- 1. "Bde Maka Ska" Released: November 8, 2019; 2. "Lovely" Released: December 13, 2019; 3. "Love Each Other" Released: January 13, 2020; 4. "Whenever" Released: May 7, 2020

Whenever is the tenth studio album by American hip-hop duo Atmosphere. It was surprise released via Rhymesayers Entertainment on December 13, 2019. On November 8, 2019, the first single, "Bde Maka Ska", was released. Its videoclip, directed by Tomas Askamit, was shot in the location of the eponymous Bde Maka Ska lake in Minneapolis.

From January 13, 2020 to February 28, Atmosphere, accompanied by Nikki Jean, The Lioness and DJ Keezy, embarked on The Wherever Tour to promote the album.

== Critical reception ==
Reviewing the album for RapReviews, Steve Flash gave it a perfect 10/10, writing that "Whenever comes laden with expectations and cliches (...) Ant is expected to create beautiful music to accompany the words — and he does. Slug is expected to deliver consequential words while also mining the depths of his own personal failings — and he does. (...) The thing about cliches when it comes to Atmosphere is they’re all true."

Writing for Everything Is Noise, Ashley Jacob notes that Atmosphere "succeed in providing yet another emotionally digestible and largely spiritual product that might just put you in the right frame of mind for the day" and Tannen Holt of The Southerner (MN) concurred, saying the album "has rich and dense emotional content."

Sean McPherson of The Current noted that the album offers what is expected of an Atmosphere record: "a handful of spectacular songs, some amazing cameo spots and rock-solid production and lyricism throughout."

== Track listing ==
Professional ratings
Review scores
Source	Rating
AllMusic	3.5/5 stars
RapReviews	10/10
Underground Hip Hop Blog	7/10

No.	Title	Length
1.	"Bde Maka Ska"	2:50
2.	"Push Play"	2:18
3.	"Postal Lady"	3:52
4.	"Love Each Other"	3:33
5.	"Romance"	3:10
6.	"Dearly Beloved" (featuring Musab and Muja Messiah)	3:29
7.	"The Hands of Time"	3:13
8.	"Whenever" (featuring Murs, Haphduzn and Gifted Gab)	3:44
9.	"Lovely" (featuring Nikki Jean)	4:37
10.	"Son of Abyss"	4:11
11.	"You're Gonna Go"	3:44
12.	"The Ceiling"	4:10
