= The Dynospectrum =

Studio album by The Dynospectrum
- Released: October 13, 1998
- Recorded: March 1997
- Studio: RSE Studios, Minneapolis, Minnesota, U.S.
- Genre: Hip hop
- Length: 72:23
- Label: Rhymesayers Entertainment
- Producer: Solomon Grundy

The Dynospectrum is a studio album by The Dynospectrum, a collaboration between rappers Slug, I Self Devine, Sab the Artist, and Swift. They performed under the pseudonyms Sep Se7en, Pat Juba, General Woundwart, and Mr. Gene Poole, respectively. The production was handled by Ant, who assumed the name Solomon Grundy for the project. It was released on Rhymesayers Entertainment on October 13, 1998.

In a 2008 interview with Impose, Slug said: "When we made the Dynospectrum, I was so high, I really thought we were like a legion of superheroes." In 2015, he picked it as one of the label's most underrated albums.

== Critical reception ==
Professional ratings
Review scores
Source	Rating
City Pages	favorable

Peter S. Scholtes of City Pages placed the album at number 10 on the "Top Local Records of 1998" list, describing it as "a dense, tense, ultimately rewarding journey into hip hop's dark heart." Writing for City Pages in 2013, Chaz Kangas called it "one of the greatest hidden treasures of the Rhymesayers catalog". In that year, Potholes in My Blog placed it at number 7 on the "12 Best Rhymesayers Albums" list.

== Track listing ==
No.	Title	Length
1.	"You Can Lose Your Mind"	4:59
2.	"Introspectrum"	2:05
3.	"Headphone Static"	3:56
4.	"Permanent on Surfaces"	4:51
5.	"Breath of Fresh"	4:44
6.	"The Winter Moon"	5:30
7.	"Brief Interlude"	0:42
8.	"Appearing Live"	5:32
9.	"Southside Myth"	4:48
10.	"Traction"	4:06
11.	"Decompression Chamber"	4:43
12.	"Evidence of Things Not Seen"	4:24
13.	"Superior Friends"	3:52
14.	"I Wouldn't Want You to Die Uninformed"	3:05
15.	"Tenfold"	3:34
16.	"Anything Is Everything"	4:53
17.	"Armor"	6:46
Total length:		72:23

20th anniversary vinyl edition (2018) bonus tracks
No.	Title	Length
18.	"Mass Exodus"	4:54
19.	"He Who Dies with the Most Toys"	3:53
20.	"Obstacles"	5:27

== Personnel ==
Credits adapted from liner notes.

- Sep Se7en (Slug) – vocals
- Pat Juba (I Self Devine) – vocals
- General Woundwart (Sab the Artist) – vocals
- Mr. Gene Poole (Swift) – vocals
- Solomon Grundy (Ant) – production, turntables, recording, mixing
- Dr. Moreau – recording, mixing, layout, design
- Abuse (Aaron Horkey) – artwork, layout, design
- Kevin Craig – photography
