= Ant (producer) =

American record producer

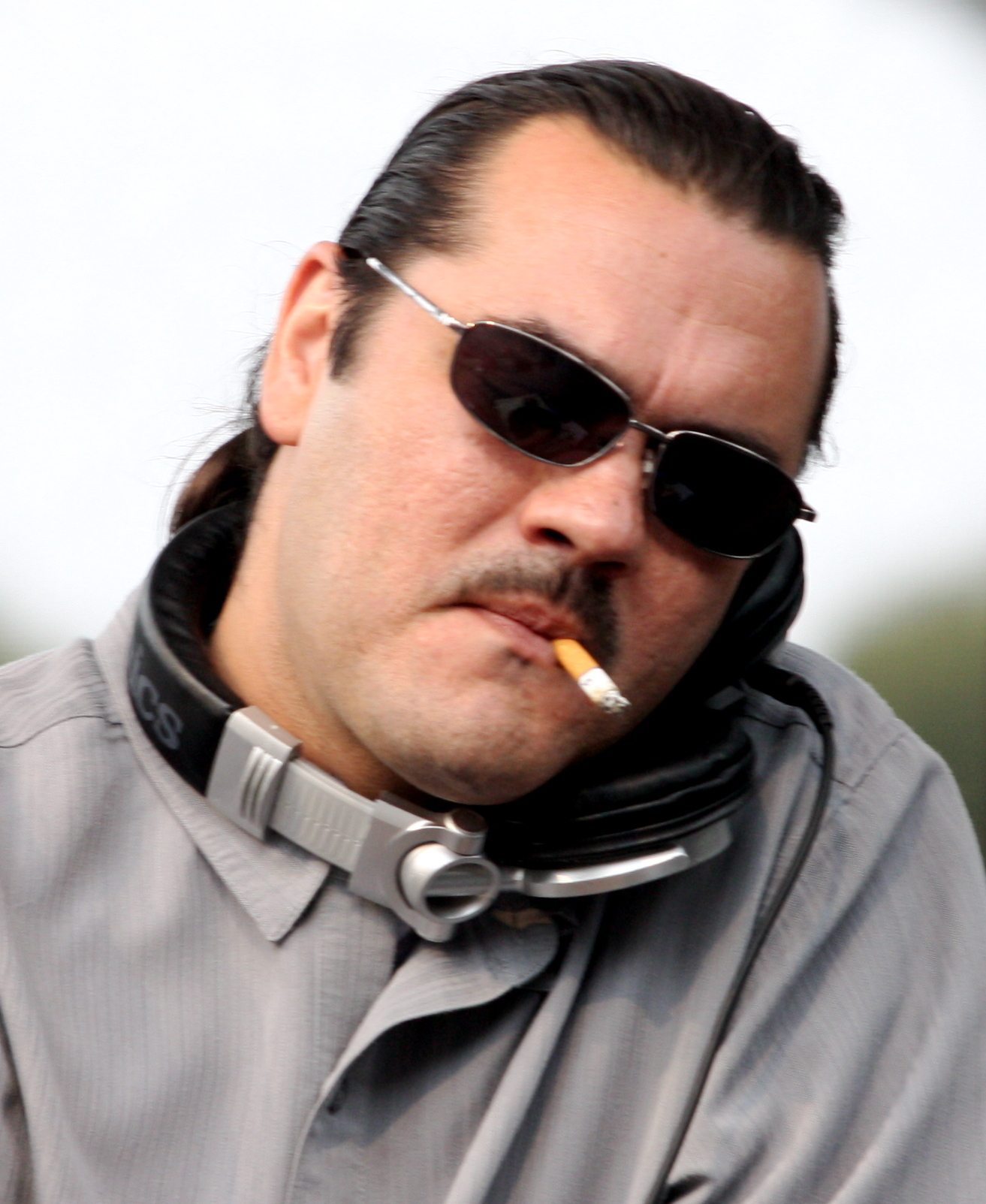
- Ant in 2009

Background information
- Born: Anthony Davis; September 6, 1970 (age 56)
- Origin: Minneapolis, Minnesota, U.S.
- Genres: Hip hop
- Occupation: Producer
- Years active: 1985–present
- Label: Rhymesayers Entertainment
- Website: Webpage

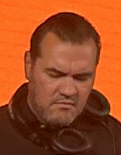
Ant in 2023

Anthony Davis (born September 6, 1970), better known by his stage name Ant, is an American hip hop producer. He is best known as being one half of the hip hop group Atmosphere, but has worked with many other artists and projects, mostly with Rhymesayers Entertainment, such as Brother Ali, I Self Devine, Felt and The Dynospectrum. He has also released six albums, Melodies and Memories, Melodies and Memories 85–89 and four volumes under the title Collection of Sounds.

== Biography ==
Ant started to become interested in DJing at a very young age. He would watch his father DJ in the army while he would picture himself as Grandmaster Flash. Years later he would start to use producing and DJing as much more than a hobby. The first CD that he worked on was Comparison by Beyond, later known by Sab the Artist, in 1996. While producing that album, he met Sean Daley (Slug) and they later worked together. With one exception (Lucy Ford: The Atmosphere EPs), Ant has produced every Atmosphere album in full. He also works with various artists that are a part of Rhymesayers Entertainment (including full production of three Brother Ali albums) and many more.

== Discography ==
Solo releases

- Melodies and Memories (2001)
- Melodies and Memories 85–89 (2005)
- Collection of Sounds Vol. 1 (2024)
- Collection of Sounds Vol. 2 (2024)
- Collection of Sounds Vol. 3 (2025)
- Collection of Sounds Vol. 4 (2025)

with Atmosphere

- Overcast! (1997)
- Lucy Ford: The Atmosphere EP's (2001)
- God Loves Ugly (2002)
- Seven's Travels (2003)
- Headshots: SE7EN (2005)
- You Can't Imagine How Much Fun We're Having (2005)
- When Life Gives You Lemons, You Paint That Shit Gold (2008)
- To All My Friends, Blood Makes the Blade Holy: The Atmosphere EP's (2010)
- The Family Sign (2011)
- Southsiders (2014)
- Fishing Blues (2016)
- Mi Vida Local (2018)
- Whenever (2019)
- The Day Before Halloween (2020)
- WORD? (2021)
- So Many Other Realities Exist Simultaneously (2023)
- Jestures (2025)

production for Brother Ali

- Shadows on the Sun (Rhymesayers Entertainment, 2003)
- Champion EP (Rhymesayers Entertainment, 2004)
- The Undisputed Truth (Rhymesayers Entertainment, 2007)
- Us (Rhymesayers Entertainment, 2009)
- All the Beauty in This Whole Life (Rhymesayers Entertainment, 2017)
- Satisfied Soul (Mello Music Group, 2025)

with Felt

- Felt 2: A Tribute to Lisa Bonet (Rhymesayers Entertainment, 2005)
- Felt 4 U (Rhymesayers Entertainment, 2020)

Other production

- Beyond – Comparison (Rhymesayers Entertainment, 1996)
- The Dynospectrum – The Dynospectrum (Rhymesayers Entertainment, 1998)
- Agape – Many Rooms (2002)
- Kanser – Now (Self-released, 1997) Ant produces all tracks except "Open Your Eyes"
- Kanser – Network (Self-released, 1998) Ant produces the track "612"
- Kanser – Inner City Outer Space (Interlock Records, 2000) Ant produces the track "Girls Step To This"
- Deep Puddle Dynamics – The Taste of Rain... Why Kneel (anticon, 1999) Ant produces the track "The Scarecrow Speaks"
- Musab – Respect the Life (Rhymesayers Entertainment, 2002) Ant produces the tracks "Posin'", "Cut Throat", "Extravagant", "In My World", "Powerite", "Make Believe", "Fools Paradise", and "Falling Apart"
- Murs – The End of the Beginning (definitive jux, 2003) Ant produces the tracks "18/w A Bullet (Remix)" & "Got Damned"
- The Planets – The Opening (Red Sea Records, 2002) Ant produces the track "Global"
- MF Doom – Mm..LeftOvers (Rhymesayers Entertainment, 2004) Ant remixes the track "Hoe Cakes"
- Sage Francis – Human the Death Dance (Epitaph Records, 2007) Ant produces the track "High Step"
- Traditional Methods – Falling Forward (Interlock Records, 2004) Ant produces the track "Falling Forward"
- I Self Devine – Self Destruction (Rhymesayers Entertainment, 2005) Ant produces the tracks "Getcha Money On", "All I Know", "Sex Sex Sex", "Feel My Pain", "I Can't Say Nothing Wrong", "Overthrow" and "Sunshine".
