= Atmosphere (group) =

American hip-hop duo from Minneapolis

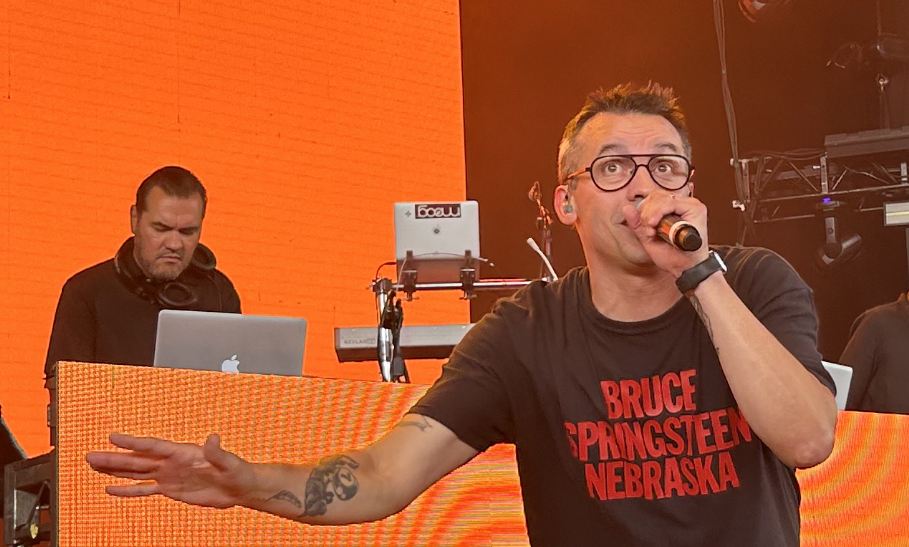
- Atmosphere performing in 2023. From left to right: Ant and Slug

Background information
- Origin: Minneapolis, Minnesota, U.S.
- Genres: Midwestern hip-hop, Twin Cities hip-hop
- Works: Atmosphere discography
- Years active: 1996–present
- Label: Rhymesayers Entertainment
- Members: Slug; Ant
- Past members: Spawn; Stress; Beyond
- Website: rhymesayers.com/atmosphere

Atmosphere is an American hip-hop duo from Minneapolis, Minnesota, consisting of rapper Slug (Sean Daley) and DJ/producer Ant (Anthony Davis); founding member Spawn (Derek Turner) left the group after the release of the group's first album Overcast!. With the exception of a few tracks on the album Lucy Ford, Ant has produced every Atmosphere record. Since its formation in 1996, the group has released thirteen studio albums and ten extended plays.

== History ==
=== Before Overcast! ===
Sean Daley and Derek Turner met while attending Washburn High School. The pair took the names Slug and D-Spawn, respectively, as rapper names. They initially performed under the name "Mental Subjects", before changing the name to "A Rhythmic Culture", and finally settling on "Urban Atmosphere". Originally, Spawn performed as the rapper, with Slug acting as DJ. Eventually Spawn convinced Slug to start rapping as well. Through the rapper Musab (then known as Beyond), Slug was introduced to the producer Ant after they went to his house to record a track. Slug saw an opportunity to work with Ant and convinced Spawn to record further with him. They soon started recording songs with Ant, learning how to structure the songs properly and practicing vocal delivery. Eventually the group dropped the "Urban" from their name.

Atmosphere, as a group, joined with other rappers Musab, Phull Surkle, Black Hole, and The Abstract Pack to form a collective known as Headshots. This group later evolved into the record label Rhymesayers. Over time, a series of cassettes was released under the Headshots name which earned some local acclaim. By 1996, Slug, Stress and Musab were making national appearances such as on NPR's All Things Considered. Rhymesayers became a record label when Siddiq, unhappy with their treatment at a number of local studios, decided to buy his own.

=== Overcast! (1997) ===
Spawn left the group three years after their first album, Overcast!, was released. Overcast! introduced Atmosphere to a wider audience, largely thanks to the airplay that the single "Scapegoat" received on college radio stations. Meanwhile, Slug improved his live performance skills at Minneapolis clubs such as The Front (Freeloaded), First Avenue and 7th Street Entry. In 1998, two albums recorded by underground rap supergroups involved Atmosphere. The Dynospectrum involved Atmosphere as well as Beyond (Musab), Swift (of Phull Surkle) and I Self Divine. Deep Puddle Dynamics released by the Oakland, California, based underground rap label Anticon, included Slug, Sole, Alias and Doseone rapping over beats by Jel.

=== Headshots Se7en (1999) ===
In 1998, Slug and Ant began to record the group's 2nd full-length album, "Headshots Se7en." At the time it was only released on cassette, and didn't see a full CD re-issue until 2005. However, it is still one of the group's most critically acclaimed albums.

=== Ford and Lucy Ford (2000–2001) ===
Now touring nationally on a more regular basis (the twenty-one date Ford One Tour brought them to the East Coast for the first time), Slug was able to leave his job at a record store, as well as a second job working overnight shifts at a department store. In 1999, the Rhymesayers-owned record store, The Fifth Element, was opened in Minneapolis. In 2001, the two EPs, Ford and Lucy, were combined and released as an LP titled Lucy Ford: The Atmosphere EPs. Originally intended as a tour-only release, it sold so well that it was later released as an official LP, making it the only Atmosphere album with producers other than Ant. In 2001, Atmosphere made three separate tours across North America and Europe. With Lucy Ford, Atmosphere also finally achieved national distribution through the independent distributor Fat Beats.

=== God Loves Ugly (2002) ===
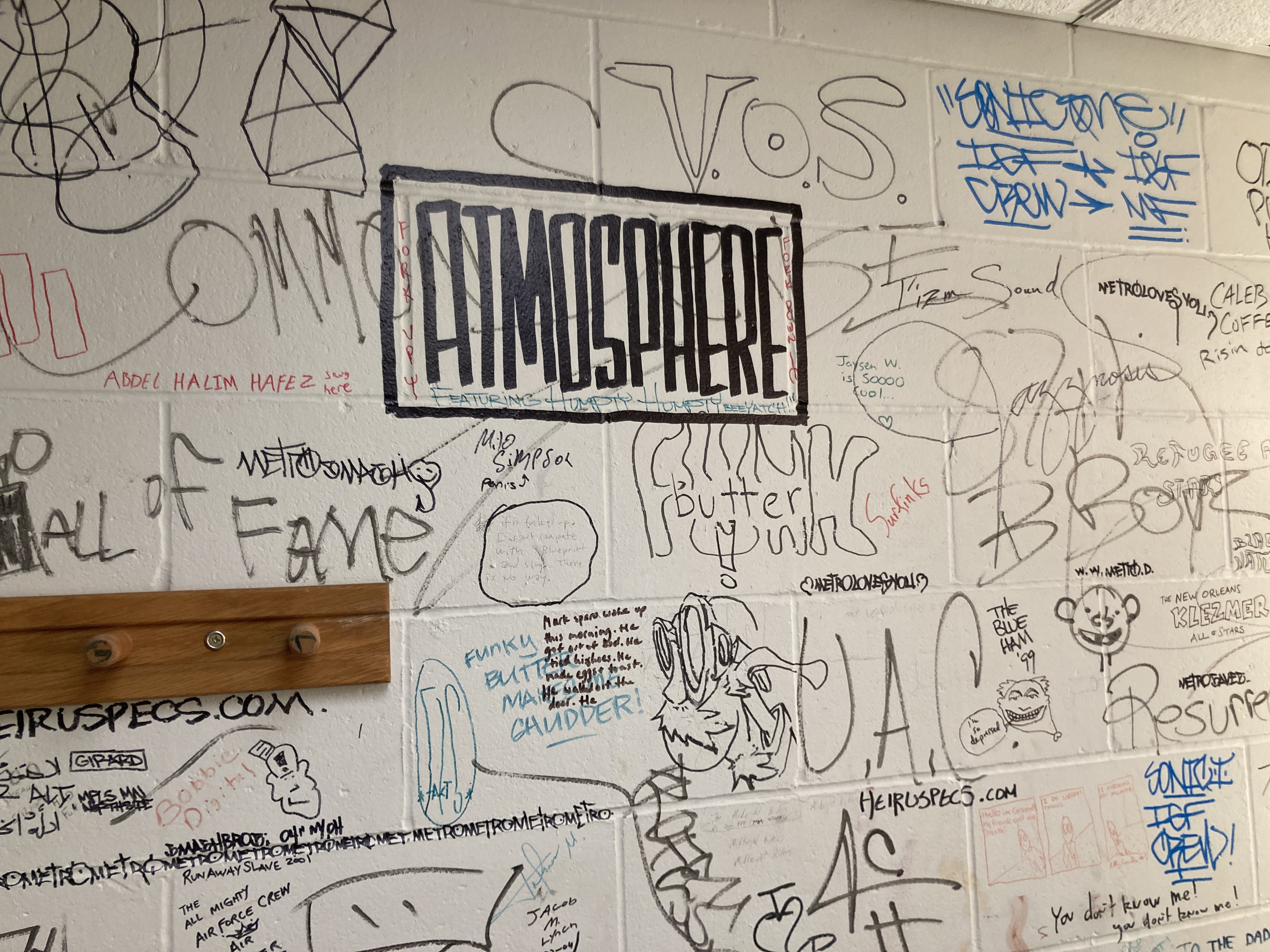
Signed green room wall at Grinnell College's Harris Center.

Atmosphere planned to release their second studio album God Loves Ugly on June 11, 2002, but experienced delays in editing. The record had more straightforward, almost battle-centric, lyrics from Slug. It was distributed nationally, again through Fat Beats, and sold over 130,000 copies. The album generated two singles: "Modern Man's Hustle" and "GodLovesUgly". Atmosphere toured extensively in support of this record, going as far as Europe and Japan, playing sixty shows in seventy-one days. After the tour, Daley spent his holidays in the Australian outback. The success of the album and subsequent tours came to the attention of the major labels Interscope, Sony and Warner Brothers. Despite these overtures, Atmosphere decided to stay independent.

=== Seven's Travels (2003) ===
Atmosphere's third full-length studio album, Seven's Travels, was released on September 23, 2003, through Rhymesayers and the punk label Epitaph. It contained two singles, "Trying To Find A Balance" and "National Disgrace", both of which had music videos that received airplay on MTV2 and other stations, attracting more attention and success for Atmosphere than previous releases. The album included a guest appearance from label mate Brother Ali and was entirely produced by Ant. Several songs on Seven's Travels contain lyrics pertaining to relationship problems, alcohol and depression. The single, "Trying To Find A Balance", was used on the video game Tony Hawk's Underground 2.

The album cover for Seven's Travels was interpreted by some as an homage to The Beatles (1968). However, that was not the case; the original planned cover depicted a nude woman lying in a field.

=== You Can't Imagine How Much Fun We're Having (2005) ===
Released in 2005, Atmosphere's fourth album You Can't Imagine How Much Fun We're Having was a departure from the sound of the previous two albums. Though production was once again entirely by Ant, the sound and lyrical content of the album had a more "raw" style than Godlovesugly and Seven's Travels. Reviews were generally positive, with Stylust saying "The result may be, in a manner of speaking, the most consistent Atmosphere album to date." The opening track "The Arrival" appeared on EA Sports' Fight Night Round 3.

=== The Seasons EPs and Strictly Leakage (2007–2008) ===
While completing the LP When Life Gives You Lemons, You Paint That Shit Gold, Atmosphere released four EPs as continuations of the "Sad Clown Bad Dub" series. These were Sad Clown Bad Summer 9, Sad Clown Bad Fall 10, Sad Clown Bad Winter 11 and Sad Clown Bad Spring 12. The EPs were popular in the Minneapolis area due to many references to local places, such as songs named after streets in the area ("66th street", "Lyndale Avenue"). The song "Sunshine", from the Bad Summer EP, was released as a single. Despite not having a music video or any promotion, the song became popular among the band's core fan base, eventually becoming a staple in live shows. Later, in 2015, the group released a music video through Rhymesayers Entertainment.

After the EPs, the group also released the free album Strictly Leakage in late 2007.

=== When Life Gives You Lemons, You Paint That Shit Gold (2008) ===
This album garnered much acclaim from local as well as international fans. Likely Atmosphere's most commonly known album of the 21st century, it has gained wide attention from a vast audience, featuring Slug's story-telling-rap style songs such as "Yesterday", a song symbolizing Slug's relationship with his father, and "The Waitress", which is interpreted differently throughout his fan-base. During the recording process of When Life Gives You Lemons, You Paint That Shit Gold, Slug was invited by Rick Rubin to Rubin's house to work through early demos of the album's tracks. No advance copies of the album were ever released online in attempts to build anticipation for the album's release.

=== Leak at Will (2009) ===
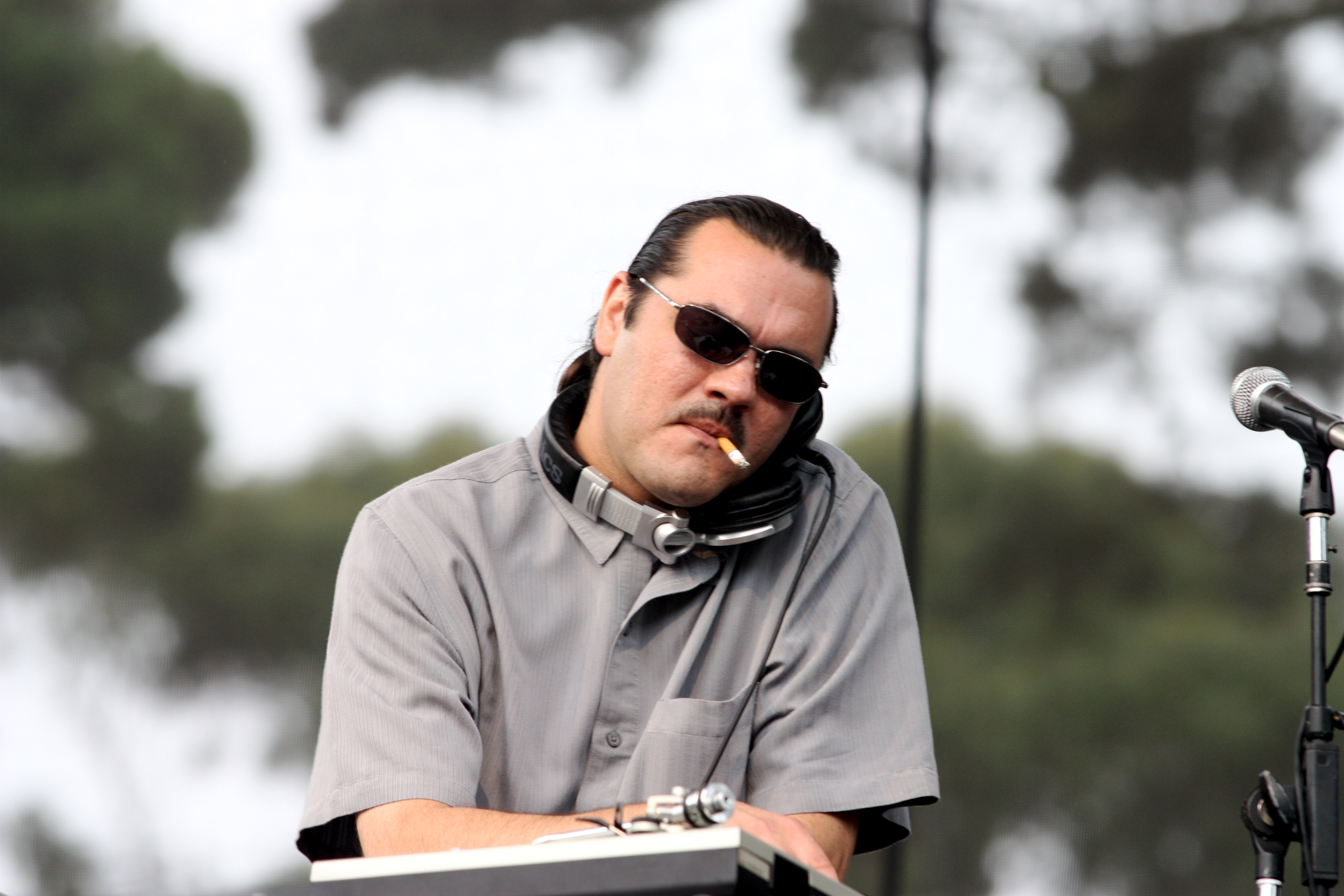
Ant at Outside Lands in 2009

Between the release of When Life Gives You Lemons and To All My Friends, Atmosphere released another free EP in 2009 called Leak at Will, with seven original tracks. Similar to Strictly Leakage, the EP was intended to tide over fans until the release of their next album.

=== To All My Friends, Blood Makes The Blade Holy: The Atmosphere EPs (2010) ===
A combination of EPs, the album To All My Friends, Blood Makes The Blade Holy: The Atmosphere EP's was released in September 2010. The album reached #2 on iTunes top 10 album downloads during the week of September 11, 2010. The album was very favourably reviewed, with some reviews comparing it to the Lucy Ford LP. The seventh track of the album, "The Loser Wins," is on the soundtrack for EA Sports' "Fight Night Champion."

=== The Family Sign (2011) ===
After 2010's double EP, Atmosphere returned with their first full-length album in three years. The Family Sign was released in 2011, and is Atmosphere's sixth studio album. Continuing the trend of preceding albums, The Family Sign has more instrumentation and is the first album to have actual band musicians. Keyboard player Erick Anderson and guitarist Nate Collis, part of the touring band for Atmosphere (who perform live renditions of songs that are normally sampler/drum machine produced), were brought in to help record the album, leading to a much different sound than previous albums. One of the songs, "Just For Show", was put on the sound track of MLB 2K12.

=== Southsiders (2014) ===
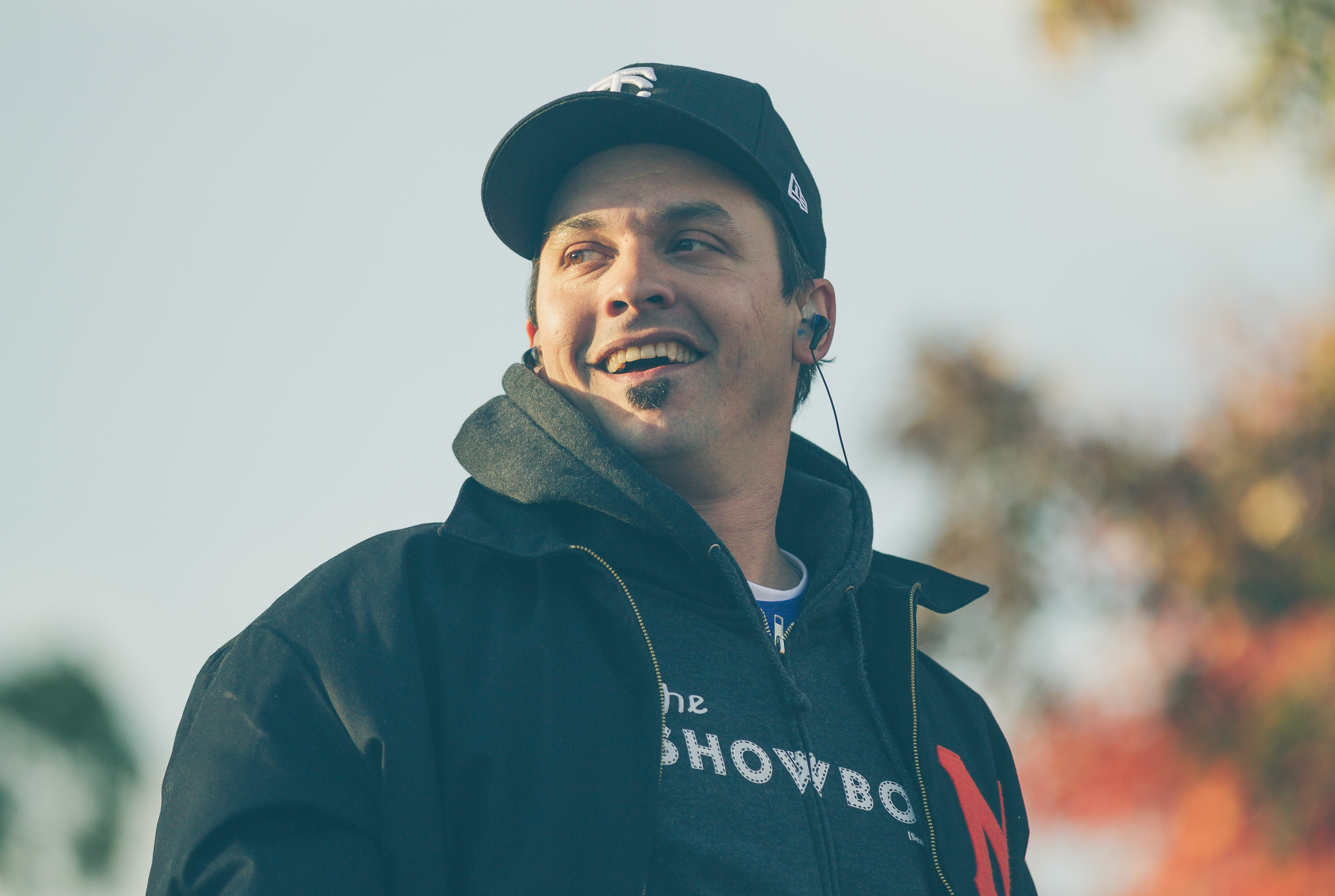
Slug at the Day of Dignity concert in 2012

On July 2, 2013, Atmosphere released a new single titled "Bob Seger". Earlier on in the year, Slug mentioned he was working on a new album. On March 10, 2014, Atmosphere released a video for a new single titled "Bitter". They also announced that their new album will be called Southsiders, which was released on May 6, 2014.

The album track "Kanye West" was released on April 8, 2014, to the group's YouTube channel followed by the official video on April 14.

=== Frida Kahlo vs Ezra Pound, Fishing Blues and Mi Vida Local (2016–2018) ===
During span of 2015–2016, Atmosphere released seven new songs including "Finer Things" (feat. deM atlaS), "This Lonely Rose" (feat. Blueprint and Aesop Rock), "My Best Half", "Salma Hayek", "Trying to Fly" (feat. Eric Mayson), "Fireflies" (feat. Grieves) and "Windows "(feat. Prof). These eventually were put together and called Frida Kahlo vs Ezra Pound. On June 22, 2016, the band announced the track list and release date for their upcoming album, Fishing Blues. The first single, titled "Ringo," was posted on YouTube the same day. On July 29, 2016, they released a new single titled "No Biggie". The album included guest appearances by rappers Kool Keith, MF Doom, The Grouch, Aesop Rock, and deM atlaS, as well as artists Kim Manning and I.B.E. The album was released on August 12, 2016.

In 2018, a promotional song named "Make It All Better Again" was released. Shortly after, a new album, Mi Vida Local, was announced to be released in October 2018.

=== Mi Vida Local (2018), Whenever (2019) and The Day Before Halloween (2020) ===
On October 5, 2018, Atmosphere released their ninth album, Mi Vida Local. The album features 12 tracks, including the pre-released single "Virgo" in September.

On November 8, 2019, Atmosphere released a new single "Bde Maka Ska", along with tour dates for 2020.

On December 12, 2019, Atmosphere released their tenth album, Whenever. The album features 12 tracks, including the pre-released single "Bde Maka Ska".

On September 23, 2020, Atmosphere released a new single "Blotter Acid Reflux Syndrome" and announced a new album titled The Day Before Halloween to be released on the date referenced in-title. The Day Before Halloween includes 10 tracks and was released October 30, 2020.

=== Word? and So Many Other Realities Exist Simultaneously (2021–2023) ===
On October 8, 2021, Atmosphere released their twelfth album, Word?

On May 5, 2023, Atmosphere released their thirteenth album, So Many Other Realities Exist Simultaneously.

=== Jestures (2025–present) ===
On July 24, 2025, Atmosphere announced their fourteenth studio album, Jestures, which was released on September 19, 2025.

== Touring ==
Slug credits most of the group's success to the large amount of touring they do. In the early days, they once drove from Minneapolis to Dallas to play a show for $250.

While touring around the years of the new millennium, Slug, Eyedea, and DJ Abilities would perform shows together as Atmosphere. Eyedea would support MC, perform his own songs, and freestyle with Slug while DJ Abilities would DJ. Soon after the release of God Loves Ugly, Mr. Dibbs would tour with Atmosphere instead of Eyedea & Abilities.

During the @ It Again tour, Atmosphere was accompanied by a live band, with Nate Collis on guitar (2004–2012), Brett Johnson on bass guitar (2004–2008), Erick Anderson on keyboards (2004–2012) and Patrick Armitage on drums (2004–2005). Armitage was replaced in late 2005 by Brian McLeod (2005–2008) for the "Pour Me Another" tour. The live set-up brought a jazzy, more improvisational feel to Atmosphere's sound. Slug has said he wanted to play with a live band to add more of a challenge to performing live. Atmosphere has been playing with a live band since at least 2001.

Since the Paint Your City Gold series of "release parties" in support of When Life Gives You Lemons, You Paint That Shit Gold, the live band has been re-rostered with Ant providing percussion as DJ, Nate Collis on guitar and back up vocals, Erick Anderson on keyboards and synthesizers and Mankwe Ndosi as the "human samples".

In spring 2009, Atmosphere embarked on the "When God Gives You Ugly" tour to celebrate the re-release of the 2002 album God Loves Ugly (which had been out of print) as well as their studio LP When Life Gives You Lemons, You Paint That Shit Gold. Slug and Ant were accompanied by Attracted To Gods, P.O.S, Brother Ali, Eyedea and Abilities during the tour.

In late 2016, Atmosphere toured for their album Fishing Blues. They started their forty show tour in Chicago in July and wrapped it up in Cleveland in November. Atmosphere had special guests at some of their shows, music groups like Lifter Puller, Brother Ali, deM atlaS, and Dilated Peoples.

== Lyrical content ==
A prominent theme in Slug's lyrics is his allegorical usage of women, especially in his earlier work. A notable use of women by Slug is in the song "Woman with the Tattooed Hands", which he has said is "a metaphor for that same old shit that everybody has already made songs about. Just trying to find your place within a belief and faith as well as people that you want to have sex with." Further examples come in the song "Abusing of the Rib" from Headshots: SE7EN; it has been said that the "lover" Slug speaks of is actually an allegory for hip-hop itself. In the tour-only release Sad Clown Bad Dub II, Slug used both symbolism and metaphor with references to nature and relationships throughout each song, culminating in the album's penultimate track "The River."

The most notable example of such allegories is a character whom Slug refers to as "Lucy," who has been purported to be a symbol of a range of different entities. In earlier Atmosphere songs, it is believed that Slug used Lucy as a means of writing about ex-girlfriends. Lucy became so prominent that Atmosphere's 2001 album bore her name, Lucy Ford: The Atmosphere EPs, with the record itself concentrating fairly heavily on women and relationships in songs such as "Don't Ever Fucking Question That" and "Mama Had A Baby And His Head Popped Off." The song "Fuck You Lucy" from God Loves Ugly has been said to deal with Slug's dependency on alcohol. Slug himself has since said of Lucy that he originally believed "her" to be a representation of the dichotomy between himself and women. He acknowledges now that Lucy became a demonization ("Lucy Ford" being a play on words for Lucifer) of himself and his dependency on alcohol, drugs, sex and validation.

Slug raps in a very introspective style, as seen on the song "Little Man," in which he confronts the complaints that people have about him by looking at his relationship with his father and son. This introspective style became less prevalent with When Life Gives You Lemons, You Paint That Shit Gold (2008) in which Slug navigates through other peoples' lives. When Life Gives You Lemons, You Paint That Shit Gold has been noted as more of a dark album than previous works. Slug maintains the allegorical stance from previous records in songs such as "Your Glass House" which deals with his emotions towards the war in Iraq under the guise of a person waking up from a hangover.

Slug also dislikes some of the songs that he wrote before and does not perform them live, such as "Vampires" from 2002 album God Loves Ugly. Daley has stated, "when I did get my phase of trying to figure myself out, there was a lot of tug-of-war inside of me between wanting to hate a particular woman and then feeling guilty about that. And there's certain songs that I won't perform anymore, because the game of tug-of-war is over and I know where I'm at". Furthermore, Slug has criticized Atmosphere's first album Overcast!, saying: "It's obvious that I'm trying so fucking hard on Overcast and you can see through it and tell it's not a person it's more of an attempt at trying to fill the niche, it was like I was trying to prove to myself that I was a rapper."

== Collaborations ==
Slug has also released three albums with Murs from the West Coast hip-hop group Living Legends. The idea for Felt: A Tribute to Christina Ricci, their first album as a duo, came about while on tour. The two decided to see if they could garner some extra media attention for Ricci by dedicating their album to her, although according to Slug, Ricci has never responded to this or contacted the band. This debut studio album was produced by The Grouch from Living Legends.

Their second collaboration, Felt, Vol. 2: A Tribute to Lisa Bonet, produced by Ant, was released in 2005. Their third Felt album was announced on the duo's MySpace page, leaking the track "Protagonists" from the album and announcing the title (A Tribute to Rosie Perez), the release date (November 17, 2009) and the producer, Aesop Rock.

Slug was also part of Deep Puddle Dynamics, along with Anticon artists Doseone, Alias and Sole. Their only full-length release together was The Taste of Rain... Why Kneel?. The album was produced by Jel, Ant, Alias and others.

Slug has also appeared on albums by Buckshot of Black Moon and KRS-ONE, Hangar 18, C-Rayz Walz, CunninLynguists, Brother Ali, Eyedea & Abilities, Evidence, Berner, Aesop Rock, Unknown Prophets, KRS-One, Oddjobs, Vakill, DoseOne, Jel, P.O.S, X-Ecutioners, Kanser, Blueprint, Illogic, Heiruspecs, Kristoff Krane, Dem Atlas, Mac Lethal, Jean Grae, Parallel Thought, Static & Nat Ill, Grieves, DJ Vadim, Booka B, El-P, MF Doom, Roosevelt Franklin, Grayskul, Minnesota indie rock band Lifter Puller, Cool-Aide (iCON the Mic King & Chum), Anomaly (a.k.a. Jason Heinrichs), and several Living Legends albums as well as Living Legends solo projects such as The CMA. Slug also took time to congratulate DJ Free Leonard on his song "Wise Words Spoken" Featuring CMA (The Grouch and Lucky I AM of the Living Legends) in a now viral moment online.

== Honors and awards ==
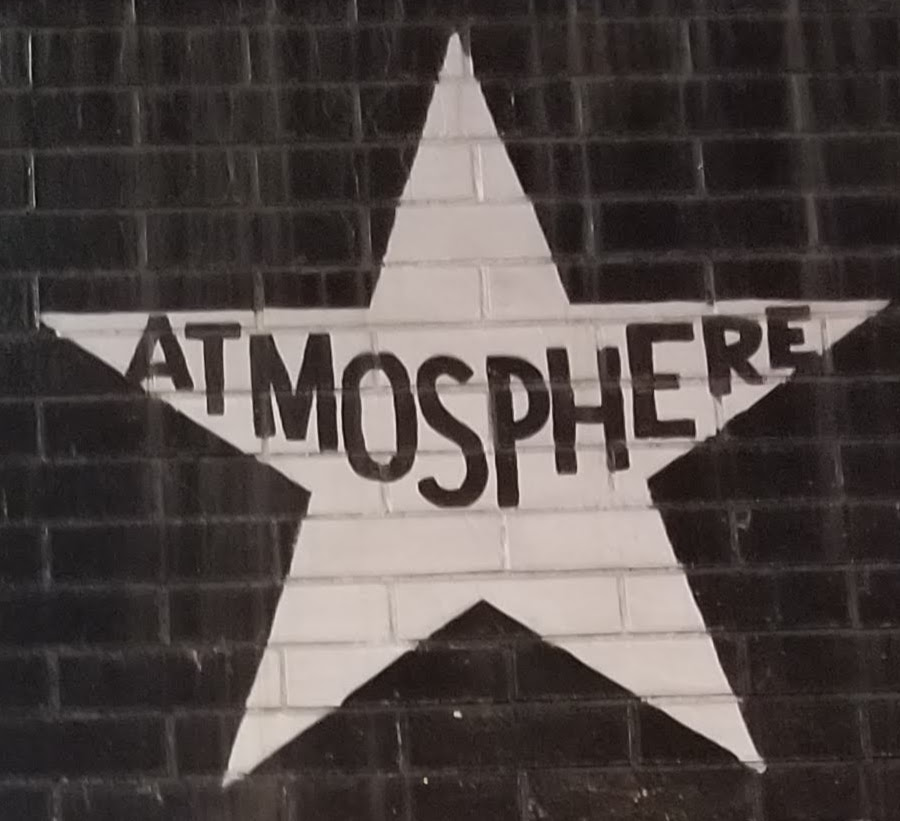
Atmosphere's star on the outside mural of Minneapolis nightclub First Avenue

Atmosphere has been honored with a star on the outside mural of the Minneapolis nightclub First Avenue, recognizing performers that have played sold-out shows or have otherwise demonstrated a major contribution to the culture at the iconic venue. Receiving a star "might be the most prestigious public honor an artist can receive in Minneapolis," according to journalist Steve Marsh.

== Discography ==
- Overcast! (1997)
- God Loves Ugly (2002)
- Seven's Travels (2003)
- You Can't Imagine How Much Fun We're Having (2005)
- When Life Gives You Lemons, You Paint That Shit Gold (2008)
- The Family Sign (2011)
- Southsiders (2014)
- Fishing Blues (2016)
- Mi Vida Local (2018)
- Whenever (2019)
- The Day Before Halloween (2020)
- Word? (2021)
- So Many Other Realities Exist Simultaneously (2023)
- Jestures (2025)
- Good Bye Make Party (2027)

== Members ==
Current members

- Slug
- Ant

Former members

- Spawn
- Stress
- Beyond

Former touring members

- Eyedea (1998–2002)
- DJ Abilities (1998–2002)
- Mr. Dibbs (2002–2007)
- Brett Johnson (2004–2008)
- Patrick Armitage (2004–2005)
- Brian Mcleod (2005–2008)
- Mankwe Ndosi (2008–2010)
- Nate Collis (2004–2014)
- Erick Anderson (2004–2014)

== See also ==
- Underground hip-hop
- Twin Cities hip-hop
