= Rhymesayers Entertainment =

American independent hip-hop record label

- Founded: 1995
- Founder: Sean Daley (Slug); Anthony Davis (Ant); Musab Saad (Sab the Artist); Brent Sayers (Siddiq)
- Distributors: ADA (former); Secretly Distribution (current)
- Genre: Hip-hop, underground hip-hop, alternative hip-hop
- Country of origin: U.S.
- Location: Minneapolis, Minnesota
- Official website: rhymesayers.com

Rhymesayers Entertainment (sometimes abbreviated RSE) is an American independent hip-hop record label based in Minneapolis.

== History ==
Rhymesayers Entertainment was co-founded in 1995 by Sean Daley (Slug), Anthony Davis (Ant), Musab Saad (Sab the Artist) and Brent Sayers (Siddiq). Former members of the Headshots crew. Beginning in 2008, Rhymesayers Entertainment sponsors the annual Soundset Music Festival, a popular attraction that takes place over Memorial Day weekend in Minneapolis. The music festival was postponed in 2020.

Rhymesayers released Prof and Dem Atlas from their label in 2020.

In 2020, Rhymesayers was among the many labels distributed by Alternative Distribution Alliance that left the company after ADA moved all of its business to the Indiana-based Direct Shot Distributing. Controversy erupted when Direct Shot received numerous complaints from retailers over delayed or missing shipments. As a result, Secretly Distribution became the current distributor for Rhymesayers Entertainment.

The label also opened a record store in 1999 called Fifth Element, which closed on April 1, 2020.

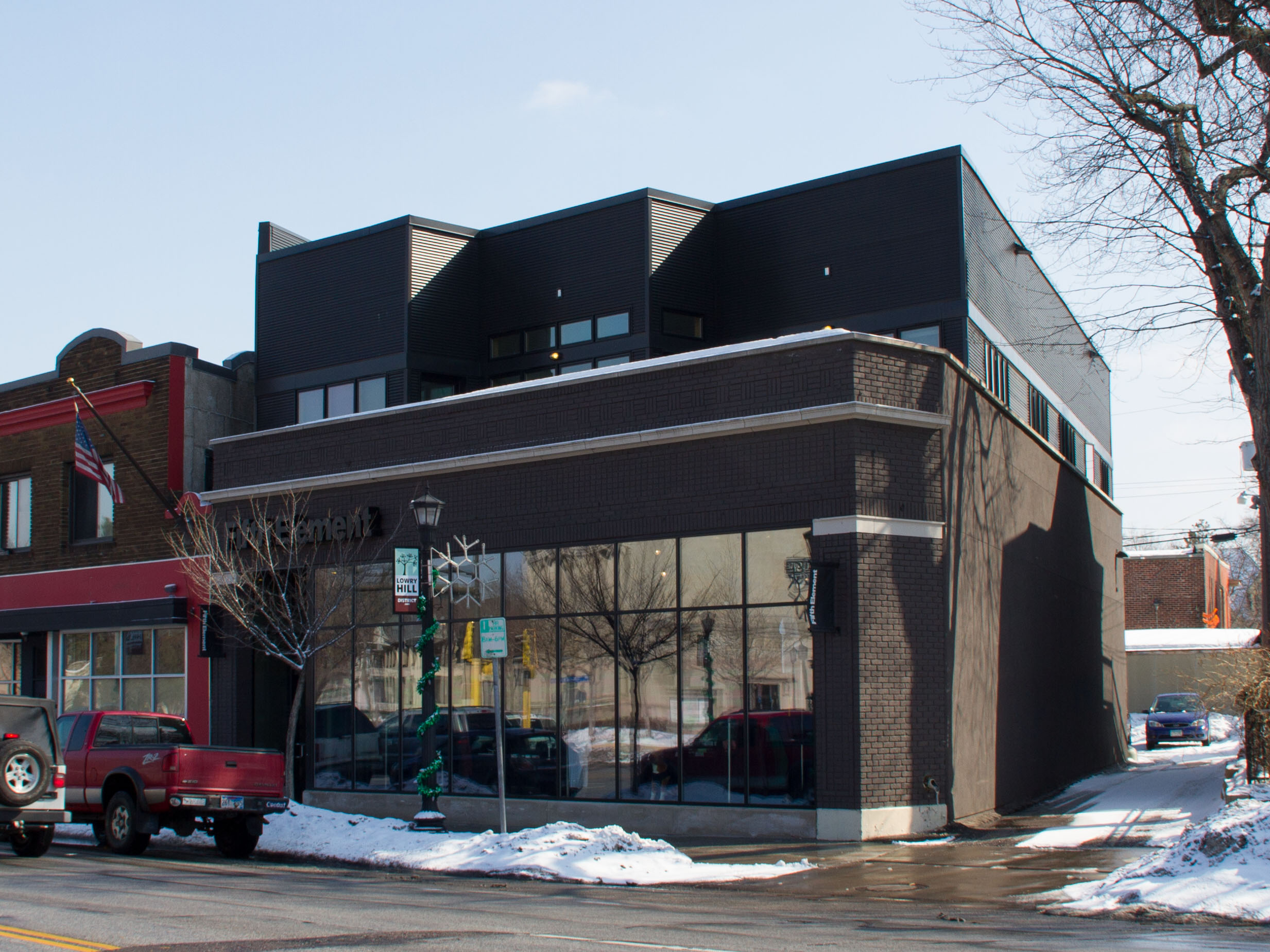
Rhymesayers Entertainment is headquartered in the same building as its former music store, Fifth Element, in Uptown, Minneapolis, 2013.

On January 23, 2026, British-American rapper IDK released his fifth mixtape, E.T.D.S. in partnership with Rhymesayers Entertainment and Broke Records, which received critical acclaim.

== Roster ==
=== Signees ===
- Aesop Rock
- Atmosphere (Slug and Ant)
- Brother Ali
- Dilated Peoples (DJ Babu, Evidence and Rakaa)
- Evidence
- Eyedea & Abilities
- Face Candy (Eyedea, Kristoff Krane, J.T. Bates and Casey O'Brien)
- Felt (Murs and Slug)
- Hail Mary Mallon (Aesop Rock, DJ Big Wiz and Rob Sonic)
- I Self Devine
- Malibu Ken (Tobacco and Aesop Rock)
- Micranots (I Self Devine and DJ Kool Akiem)
- MInk (Musab and Ink Well)
- Nikki Jean
- Sa-Roc
- Semi.Official (I Self Devine and DJ Abilities)
- Soul Position (Blueprint and RJD2)
- Step Brothers (The Alchemist and Evidence)
- The Uncluded (Aesop Rock and Kimya Dawson)

=== Archived artists ===
- Abstract Rude
- Blueprint
- Budo
- DJ Abilities
- Freeway
- Grayskul (JFK aka Ninjaface and Onry Ozzborn)
- Jake One
- MF Doom
- Mr. Dibbs
- P.O.S
- Psalm One
- Sab the Artist
- Toki Wright

=== Former artists ===
- Boom Bap Project
- The Dynospectrum
- Mac Lethal
- Prof
- Grieves
- Dem Atlas

== See also ==
- List of record labels
- Twin Cities hip-hop
- Underground hip-hop
