= Jake One production discography =

Production discography

The discography of American record producer Jake One includes a list of songs produced, co-produced and remixed by year, artists, album and title.

== Production credits ==
=== 1998 ===
Conception Records - Walkman Rotation

- 02. "World Premier"
- 03. "No Introduction / No Introdeezy"
- 11. "Essay on Pseudo-ism"
- 12. "Thoughts I Generate"
- 15. "Neva Scared"

=== 1999 ===
Trump Tight Records - Eyez on the Prize

- 03. "Eyez on the Prize" (performed by Lord Tariq & Peter Gunz and Kutfather)
- 06. "Game Trump Tight" (performed by Snoop Dogg, JT The Bigga Figga and Kutfather) (produced with Vitamin D)

=== 2001 ===
Mix Master Mike - Spin Psycle

- 08. "Ice Age" (performed by Encore)

Boom Bap Project - Circumstance Dictates

- 02. "Writers Guild"
- 03. "Odds on Favorite" (featuring L*Roneous)
- 04. "All Stars" (featuring Black Anger)
- 06. "The Trade"
- 07. "Net Worth" (featuring Pep Love)
- 09. "All I Have Left" (featuring JFK, Snafu and Toni Hill)

Kutfather - Hard Core / Transmission

- 01. "Hard Core"

=== 2002 ===
Musab - Respect the Life

- 09. "The Reckoning"

=== 2003 ===
DJ Babu - Duck Season Vol. 2

- 06. "Ends to Means" (performed by Rakaa-Iriscience)

Rasco - Escape from Alcatraz

- 04 "The Sweet Science"
- 05 "Put Your Hands Up"
- 09 "We Get Live"
- 10. "San Fran To The Town" (featuring Casual) (produced with Sampson S)

G-Unit - Beg for Mercy

- 08. "Betta Ask Somebody"

Sly Boogy - Judgement Day

- 04. "Fatal Mistake"
- 12. "Walk With My Dogs"
- 18. "Sashay"

Lyricist Lounge: West Coast

- 04. "Super Education Part 2" (performed by Arcee, featuring Encore)

Krondon - Feels Good / The Way A Nigga Think

- 01. "Feels Good"

=== 2004 ===
Gift of Gab - 4th Dimensional Rocketships Going Up

- 01. "The Ride of Your Life"
- 02. "Rat Race"
- 05. "Flashback"
- 06. "Up"
- 08. "To Know You" (produced with Vitamin D)
- 10. "Hold On"
- 11. "In a Minute Doe" (produced with Samson)
- 12. "Evolution"
- 13. "Moonshine"

De La Soul - The Grind Date

- 09. "Days of Our Lives"
- 12. "Rock Co.Kane Flow" (featuring MF Doom)

Kardinal Offishall - Kill Bloodclott Bill

- 11. "Fallback"

Planet Asia - The Grand Opening

- 15. "As Long As I'm Alive"

Encore - Layover

- 02. "Layover"
- 04. "Step It Up or Wrap It Up"
- 05. "Zigga Zigga"
- 07. "The Schizm"
- 08. "My Way Home"
- 10. "Chocolate Pop Corn" (featuring Choklate)
- 11. "Essentially Yours"

Vast Aire - Look Mom... No Hands

- 05. "Viewtiful Flow"

MF Doom - MM..LeftOvers

- 06. "Hoe Cakes (Jake One Remix)"

Jake One - Tale of the Tape

- 01. "Let The Drums Speak"
- 02. "Lookin' For Kessell"
- 03. "Smack Ya' Back"
- 04. "The Hard Wizzle"
- 05. "Gangster Mauriat"
- 06. "Scream"
- 07. "Hommula"
- 08. "The Return of Hommie"

=== 2005 ===
Kardinal Offishall - Fire and Glory

- 08. "Kaysarasara" (featuring Estelle)

I Self Devine - Self Destruction

- 02. "This Is It"
- 10. "Ice Cold"
- 11. "Everyday Shit"

John Cena and Tha Trademarc - You Can't See Me

- 01. "The Time is Now"
- 06. "Just Another Day"
- 09. "We Didn't Want You To Know"
- 15. "Know The Rep (featuring Freddie Foxxx)

Turf Talk - West Coast Vaccine: The Cure

- 13. "Sick Wid' It Is The Crew" (featuring E-40)

=== 2006 ===
- "Let Go" (from the Joy Denalane album Born & Raised)
- "You Ain't Ready" (from the Yummy Bingham album The First Seed)
- "Memories" (from the Deep Rooted album The Second Coming)

=== 2007 ===
- "Down In New York City" (from the Evidence album The Weatherman LP)
- "Clean Up Man", "Buck The World" (featuring Lyfe Jennings (from the Young Buck album Buck the World)
- "Movin on Up", "All of Me" (from the 50 Cent album Curtis)
- "Initiated (Nu-Mixx)" (featuring Boot Camp Click (from the posthumous 2Pac album Nu-Mixx Klazzics Vol. 2)
- "Don't Kill Me", "Fukk Kramer Radio (Interlude)" (from the Bishop Lamont & DJ Skee mixtape N*gger Noize)
- "It's Over" (from the Freeway album Free at Last)
- "Beast" (from the Guilty Simpson mixtape Stray Bullets)
- "Resist the Temptation (featuring Amel Larrieux" (from the posthumous 2Pac album Best of 2Pac)
- "FK 10 (from the Freundeskreis compilation album FK 10-Best Of)
- "North By Northwest" (Jake One Remix) (from the Blue Scholars album Joe Metro EP)
- "Superburn" & "The Squeeze" (featuring Smif-n-Wessun (from the Lifesavas album Gutterfly: The Soundtrack)

=== 2008 ===
- "Digital Motown" (from the Kardinal Offishall album Not 4 Sale)
- "4 All My Niggaz" (featuring Planet Asia, Mistah F.A.B. & Ya Boy (from the Black Milk & Bishop Lamont album Caltroit)
- "Ready or Not" (from the G-Unit album T.O.S: Terminate on Sight)
- "Shed Thy Blood", "Damn Daddy" (from the Prodigy album Product of the 80's)
- "High Note" (from the Scarface album Emeritus)
- "Differences", "I Can't Decide (Everywhere at Once)" (from the Lyrics Born album Everywhere at Once)
- "Where I Been" (from the Skillz album The Million Dollar Backpack)
- "Count On Free", "Blauh" (from the Freeway mixtape Month of Madness)
- "Catapults" (from the Now On album Tomorrow Already)

=== 2009 ===
- "Ballskin", "Rap Ambush", "Microwave Mayo", "More Rhymin'" (from the Doom album Born Like This)
- "Won't Be Long" (from the Rakim album The Seventh Seal)
- "Dream" (from Elzhi mixtape The Leftovers Unmixedtape)
- "The Return", "Wake Up", "Yah Have Mercy" (from the D.Black album Ali'Yah)
- "Get Right" (featuring Mistah F.A.B. & Baba Zumbi, "Seasoned" (featuring Nightclubber Lang & "Cali" (featuring Spank Pops & J Billion (from the Jern Eye album Vision)
- "No Substitute", "Life Line" (featuring One Be Lo (from the Supastition album Splitting Image)

Skyzoo - The Power of Words

- 04. "Back On The Map" (featuring Maino)

=== 2010 ===
UE Radio Live - The Official Takeover Round One

- 08. "Rock Star" (performed by Freeway)

Canibus - C of Tranquility

- 03. "C Scrolls"

T.I. - No Mercy

- 09. "Salute"

Cypress Hill - Rise Up

- 13. "Armed & Dangerous" (produced with B-Real)

Freeway

- 00. "Escalators"

Freeway

- 00. "Beautiful Music"

Freeway and Jake One - The Stimulus Package

No.	Title	Length
1.	"Stimulus Intro" (featuring Beanie Sigel)	1:54
2.	"Throw Your Hands Up"	3:45
3.	"One Foot In"	3:30
4.	"She Makes Me Feel Alright"	3:37
5.	"Never Gonna Change"	3:46
6.	"One Thing" (featuring Raekwon)	3:48
7.	"Know What I Mean"	2:17
8.	"The Product"	3:39
9.	"Microphone Killa" (featuring Young Chris)	3:30
10.	"Follow My Moves" (featuring Birdman)	4:07
11.	"Sho' Nuff" (featuring Bun B)	4:15
12.	"Freekin' the Beat" (featuring LaToiya Williams)	4:24
13.	"Money" (featuring Omilio Sparks and Mr. Porter)	3:56
14.	"Free People"	3:01
15.	"Stimulus Outro"	5:34
16.	"African Drums" (deluxe edition bonus track)	3:07
17.	"Always-N-Forever" (deluxe edition bonus track)	2:44

Ghostface Killah - Apollo Kids

- 12. "Troublemakers" (featuring Raekwon and Method Man & Redman)

J.Pinder - Code Red

- 02. "All That Fire" (featuring Zach Bruce)

Lyrics Born - As U Were

- 02. "I Wanna B W/U" (produced with Lyrics Born)
- 06. "I've Lost Myself" (featuring Joyo Velarde) (produced with Lyrics Born)
- 09. "Pushed Aside/Pulled Apart" (featuring Lateef the Truthspeaker) (produced with Lyrics Born)

The Quiett - Quiet Storm: A Night Record

- 02. Never Q.U.I.T.T.

=== 2011 ===
Snoop Dogg - Doggumentary

- 01. "Toyz N Da Hood" (featuring Bootsy Collins)
- 12. "Gangbang Rookie" (featuring Pilot)

Slim the Mobster

- 00. "I Ain't Gonna Say Nothing"

Canibus and Keith Murray as The Undergods - In Gods We Trust – Crush Microphones to Dust

- 04. Undergods Roll

Vakill - Armor of God

- 03. "Armor of God"
- 14. "Armorgeddon (Shit On You)"
- 17. "Proof"

E-40 - Revenue Retrievin': Overtime Shift

- 16. "Lookin' Back (featuring Devin the Dude)

Freeway

- 00. "Snappa Pow" (featuring Peedi Peedi)

Joell Ortiz

- 00. "Seven Deuces"

Grynch

- 00. "Mister Rogers"

Mayer Hawthorne - How Do You Do

- 13. "Henny & Gingerale"

Freeway - The Intermission

- 06. "666" (featuring State Property)
- 15. "She Makes Me Feel Alright (Remix)" (featuring Wale and Mayer Hawthorne)

Slim the Mobster - War Music

- 05. "Back Against the Wall" (featuring Dr. Dre and Sly) (produced with Dr. Dre)

Longshot

- 00. "Real Thing" (featuring Psalm One)

Longshot

- 00. "Just Flow"

Snoop Dogg and Wiz Khalifa - Mac & Devin Go to High School

- 06. "Let's Go Study" (produced with Soopafly)
- 09. "French Inhale" (featuring Mike Posner)

50 Cent mixtape The Big 10

- 01. "Body on It"

=== 2012 ===
Brother Ali - Mourning in America and Dreaming in Color

- 01. "Letter To My Countrymen" (featuring Dr. Cornel West)
- 02. "Only Life I Know"
- 03. "Stop The Press"
- 04. "Mourning In America"
- 05. "Gather Round" (featuring Amir Sulaiman)
- 06. "Work Everyday"
- 07. "Need A Knot"
- 08. "Won More Hit"
- 09. "Say Amen"
- 10. "Fajr"
- 11. "Namesake"
- 12. "All You Need"
- 13. "My Beloved" (featuring Choklate and Tone Trezure)
- 14. "Singing This Song"

J.Pinder - Careless

- 07. "Jet Stream"

Sol - Yours Truly

- 07. "Rap Life"

Fatal Lucciauno - The Message

- 01. "Curtains"
- 02. "The Proclamation"
- 03. "Drunken Poetry"
- 04. "Sinner's Prayer"
- 05. "Warm Ups"
- 06. "My Caliber"
- 07. "Speak On It" (featuring Grynch and Spac3man)
- 08. "The Mad Hatter"
- 09. "The Life"
- 10. "Don't Look Back"
- 11. "Cry For Help"

Chase N. Cashe

- 00. "Trill Living 4.0"

Grynch - Perspectives

- 01. "Perspective"
- 02. "So Far" (featuring Brother Ali and Shaprece)
- 04. "Mister Rogers" (produced with DJ Nphared)
- 09. "Too High"

Brother Ali - The Bite Marked Heart

- 01. "Shine On"
- 02. "Electric Energy"
- 03. "I'll Be Around" (featuring Phonte and Stokley Williams)
- 06. "Haunted Housebroken" (featuring Aby Wolf)
- 07. "Bite Marked Heart"

Wiz Khalifa - Taylor Allderdice

- 14. "The Grinder"

Joy Denalane

- 00. "Should Have Never (Jake One Remix)" (featuring Bilal)

I Self Devine - The Sound of Low Class Amerika

- 12. "The World As It Is"
- 13. "As It Can Be"

50 Cent - The Lost Tape

- 14. "Lay Down (Smoked)" (featuring Ned The Wino)

Rain - The Magic Hour 3

- 02. "Live Fast, Die Young"

Fun - Some Nights

- 08. "All Alright" (produced with Emile Haynie and Jeff Bhasker)

Rick Ross - God Forgives, I Don't

- 03. "3 Kings" (featuring Dr. Dre and Jay-Z)

AWAR - The Laws of Nature

- 03. "Stairsteps" (featuring Has-Lo)
- 06. "Gambling Spot" (featuring DJ Majic)
- 08. "Elephant Gun"

Fatal Lucciauno - Respect

- 08. "Amazing" (featuring J.Pinder)
- 16. "One Love One Purpose"

The Physics - Tomorrow People

- 02. "Take A Win"

Craig G - Ramblings of an Angry Old Man

- 05. "Effortless" (featuring Chaundon and Big Pooh)

Scoe

- 14. "Thank You" (featuring Kendrick Lamar)

Fleeta Partee - Lifemuzik

- 04. "Apathy"

Scoe

- 00. "Thank You (Remix)" (featuring Kendrick Lamar and Slim the Mobster)

Bambu - One Rifle Per Family

- 13. "Boom"

Game - Jesus Piece

- 11. "Hallelujah" (featuring Jamie Foxx)

Freeway - Diamond in the Ruff

- 01. "Right Back" (featuring Marsha Ambrosius
- 03. "The Thirst"
- 10. "True" (featuring Wale) (produced with DJ Khalil)

Wale - Folarin

- 07. "Limitless" (featuring Scarface)

Freeway

- "Roc Reloaded" (featuring Peedi Peedi, Young Gunz, Memphis Bleek and Pain In Da Ass)

=== 2013 ===
Brother Ali - Left in the Deck

- 01. "Dial Tone"
- 02. "Grandma And Them"
- 03. "Digital Age"
- 04. "Never Stopin'"
- 05. "Not A Day Goes By"
- 06. "Well Okay"
- 07. "Steerange"
- 08. "Phantom of the Opera"
- 09. "Rapper Thing"
- 10. "Devil's Arms"

Pitbull - Global Warming: Meltdown

- 15. "Do It" (featuring Mayer Hawthorne)

Nickelus F - Vices

- 15. "Number 15" (featuring Drake)

Pusha T - Wrath of Caine

- 09. "Take My Life" (featuring Andrea Martin)

Fashawn - Champagne & Styrofoam Cups

- 10. "Just A Man"

Casual - The Return of the Backpack

- 01. "Father Figure"
- 02. "Head Jerk (Gimme Boss)"
- 03. "Bartender"
- 04. "Her Lil Sister"
- 05. "They Must Not Know"
- 06. "I Wonder"
- 07. "Rock Wit Us"
- 08. "Don't Come To The West Coast"
- 09. "Hole in One"
- 10. "Thinkin Bout My Paper"
- 11. "Enjoy Yourself"
- 12. "Just Like Oakland"
- 13. "Times Done Changed"

Chance the Rapper - Acid Rap

- 11. "Acid Rain"

Grynch

- 00. "Mister Rogers Remix" (featuring Bambu and Slug)

J. Cole

- 06. "3 Wishes"

J. Cole - Born Sinner

- 05. "Mo Money (Interlude)

Fleeta Partee

- "This Is Hip Hop" (featuring Jarrard Anthony, John Crown and Yirim Seck)

Maybach Music Group - Self Made Vol. 3

- 12. "The Great Americans" (Rick Ross featuring Gunplay, Rockie Fresh & Fabolous)
- 14. "Poor Decisions" (Wale featuring Lupe Fiasco and Rick Ross)

Wale - The Gifted

- 19. "Hella" (featuring Dom Kennedy and YG)

Wale

- "Winter Schemes" (featuring J. Cole)

Malice and Mario Sweet - Enjoy:Like:Love

- 02. "Flo Joe"

Drake - Nothing Was the Same

- 05. "Furthest Thing" (produced with 40 and Hagler)

L.E.P. Bogus Boys

- 00. "Buck 50"

Mayer Hawthorne - Where Does This Door Go

- 05. "Designer Drug" (produced with Greg Wells and Mayer Hawthorne)

AD - Intelligent Design

- 09. "Reality Check" (featuring Dice)
- 12. "Patience" (featuring Big K.R.I.T. and Che Blaq)

2014

50 Cent - Animal Ambition

- 08. "Hustler"
- 12. "The Funeral Interlude"

Dilated Peoples - Directors of Photography

- 07. "Show Me the Way" (featuring Aloe Blacc)

Chris Miles - Birth of Cool

- 01. "Time"
- 02. "Faces"
- 04. "Something"

=== 2015 ===
Tuxedo

- "Number One"

Twiztid - The Darkness

- 06. "A Little Fucked Up" (produced with Joe Strange)
- 15. "Seance"

Dave B

- 00. "The Way"

Dave B - Punch Drunk

- 08. "Leaves"

G-Unit - The Beast Is G-Unit

- 05. "Boy Boy" (produced with Illmind and G Koop)

Dom Kennedy - By Dom Kennedy

- 01. "Daddy" (produced with Swiss Hunger)
- 05. "What I Tell Kids" (produced with Skyscrapa)
- 07. "Thank You Biggie" (produced with Darrius Willrich)

Vursatyl - It's Nothing / Bring It To a Halt (plus Jake One Remix) - EP

- 02. "Bring It To a Halt [Jake One Remix]" (featuring DJ Flip Flop)

Wale - The Album About Nothing

- 10. "The Success"
- 13. "The Matrimony" (produced with DJ Khalil and Marcè Reazon)

Rick Ross - Black Dollar

- 02. "Money Dance" (featuring The-Dream
- 06. "Geechie Liberace"
- 09. "Drive A Nigga Crazy"

Future - DS2

- 15. "The Percocet & Stripper Joint" (produced with Southside and G Koop)

Rick Ross

- 00. "Buried In The Streets"

Lil Bibby - Free Crack 3

- 06. "Speak To Em" (featuring Common)

Rick Ross - Black Market

- 02. "Smile Mama, Smile" (featuring CeeLo Green)
- 06. "Dope Dick"
- 16. "Money Dance" (featuring The-Dream) (produced with S1)

First Division - Overworked & Underpaid

- 15. "The C.D.C. (Cypher for Disease Control)" (featuring Skoob, Supastition, Torae, Prince Po, Baron and Ruste Juxx)

=== 2016 ===
Freeway - Fear of a Free Planet

- 06. "Friends" (featuring Styles P)

Royce da 5'9" - Layers

- 05. "Wait"

Curren$y & Alchemist - The Carrolton Heist Remixed

- 02. Black Rally Stripes (Jake One Remix)

Hodgy Beats

- 00. "Greats"

Martell Webster - Emerald District - EP

- 01. "The District" (featuring Toine and Oddisee)
- 02. "Told 'Em" (featuring Kokayi and Phil Adé)
- 03. "Blueprint" (featuring Kingpen Slim)
- 04. "Beans"

Casey Veggies - Customized Greatly Vol. 4: The Return of the Boy

- 12. "Fortress"

Cashis - Shady Capo

- 02. "Undastood"

Dom Kennedy - Los Angeles Is Not For Sale Vol. 1

- 08. "96 Cris"

Wale

- 00. "Groundhog Day"

The Weeknd - Starboy

- 07. "True Colors" (produced with Benny Blanco, Cashmere Cat, The Weeknd and Swish

DJ Khaled – Major Key

- 01. "I Got the Keys" (featuring Jay-Z and Future) (produced with Southside and G Koop)

Cyphalliance – Livin as a MAD

- 02. "Illest"

=== 2017 ===
Future – Future

- 09. "Outta Time" (produced with Southside)

Future – Hndrxx

- 03. "Lookin Exotic" (produced with Southside)

Tuxedo – Tuxedo II

- 01. "Fux with the Tux"
- 02. "2nd Time Around"
- 03. "Take a Picture"
- 04. "Rotational"
- 05. "Shine" (featuring Gavin Turek)
- 06. "Scooter's Groove"
- 07. "U Like It"
- 08. "Back In Town"
- 09. "Special"
- 10. "Livin' 4 Your Lovin'"
- 11. "July"

Playboi Carti – Playboi Carti

- 14. "Kelly K" (produced with Southside)

Anoyd - A Time and Place

- 05. "Name Brand Water" (produced with Statik Selektah and Swish)

Travis Scott

- 00. "A Man" (produced with Southside and Max Levin)

21 Savage – Issa Album

- 04. "Bad Business" (produced with Southside and Sam Wish)
- 10. "Dead People" (produced with Southside)

Nipsey Hussle

- Been Down feat. Swizz Beatz (produced with 1500 or Nothin')

=== 2019 ===
Bobby J From Rockaway – Summer Classics

- 01. "Bobby J For President"

=== 2020 ===
Kehlani – It Was Good Until It Wasn't

- 02. "Can I"

Chloe x Halle – Ungodly Hour

- 02. "Forgive Me"

Young Nudy - Anyways

- 14. "No Pretending"

Six60 - "Fade Away"

=== 2021 ===
J. Cole - The Off-Season

- 03. "My Life feat. 21 Savage & Morray"

Larry June - Orange Print

- 01. "From Uncle Herm PT. 3 (Intro) Feat. Herm Lewis
- 02. "Tangible Assets"
- 12. "Iced Coffee"

G Herbo - 25

- 14. "Loyalty"

King Khazm – Pangea: Hip Hop Heals Compilation

- 08. "Work It Out" (featuring Abstract Rude)

=== 2022 ===
Brent Faiyaz - Wasteland

- 10. "Rolling Stone"

Freddie Gibbs - $oul $old $eparately

- 06. "Lobster Omelette" (featuring Rick Ross)

Dreamville & J. Cole - D-Day: A Gangsta Grillz Mixtape

- 07. "Freedom of Speech" (co-producer Daoud)

=== 2024 ===
Freeway & Jake One - The Stimulus Package 2

No.	Title	Producer(s)	Length
1.	"Time" (featuring Conway the Machine)	Jake One	3:10
2.	"Philly" (featuring Peedi Crakk)	Jake One	2:43
3.	"My Own" (featuring Sauce Walka)	Jake One	3:48
4.	"Keep Winning" (featuring Black Thought)	Jake One; Daoud	4:12
5.	"Price of Fame"	Jake One	2:43
6.	"Lord Forgive Me"	Jake One	3:47
7.	"Freezer"	Jake One	3:12
8.	"Ringin" (featuring Jadakiss)	Jake One	4:05
9.	"Heartbreaker"	Jake One	3:42
10.	"Nothin They Can Do"	Jake One	2:38
11.	"Crystals and Keys" (featuring Scholito)	Jake One; Mario Luciano	2:35
12.	"Bearded Legend"	Jake One; Sam Wish	3:37
13.	"Surgery" (featuring Symba)	Jake One	3:47
14.	"Family Tree"	Jake One	3:00
Total length:			46:59

Larry June - Doin it For Me

- From Uncle Herm Pt. 5
- A Little While (co-produced with DJ Khalil)
- Breakfast in Gold Coast

=== 2025 ===
Demrick & Jake One - First & Jefferson EP

- 1. "Never Get Enough"
- 2. "Don't Wait"
- 3. "Nothin Happens Overnight" (featuring Dizzy Wright & Scoop DeVille)

Huey Briss & Jake One - Never Going Bacc

- 1. "Never Going Bacc"
- 2. "Wouldn't Change Shit"
- 3. "Above Me"
- 4. "Making A Play"
- 5. "Same Spot (Stuck In A Tree)"
- 6. "Keep Em Guessing (Bless)"
- 7. "Cars and Money"

De La Soul - Cabin in the Sky

- 13. "Patty Cake"
