= Vitamin D (musician) =

American DJ and record producer

- Born: Derrick Jabbar Brown; March 22, 1976 (age 50)
- Origin: Central District, Seattle, Washington, U.S.
- Genres: Hip hop; instrumental hip-hop
- Occupations: DJ; record producer; audio engineer; songwriter; rapper
- Years active: 1989–present
- Labels: Tribal Music Inc.; Rhymesayers Entertainment
- Formerly of: Ghetto Chilldren; Sta Hi Brothers

Derrick Jabbar Brown (born March 22, 1976), known professionally as Vitamin D, is an American DJ and record producer from Central District, Seattle. He is often credited as a pioneer and key figure in the emergence of Seattle hip-hop.

== Early life and career ==
Derrick is the son of Herman Brown, formerly of the Motown group Ozone. He is also the younger cousin of Eddie "Sugar Bear" Wells of Emerald Street Boys, which is widely considered the first hip-hop group in Seattle. He attended Garfield High School.

In 1989, he founded The Pharmacy studio. In 1991, he formed the group Ghetto Chilldren with Bill "B-Self" Ryder, Dan "Capabilities" Turner, and Parish "Culture" Cockett. In 1993, they released Monologs and Soliloquys For Your Mom EP. The group was featured on the compilation albums Untranslated Prescriptions in 1995, 14 Fathoms Deep in 1996, Do the Math in 1997 and Classic Elements in 1998. In 1999, he released the mixtape Table Manners 2, followed in 2003 by No Good EP.

From 2004 to 2010, he ran an annual beat battle competition with Jonathan Moore titled Big Tune, which was sponsored by Red Bull. In the 2000s, he worked closely with fellow Seattle-based producer Jake One on a number of albums including 4th Dimensional Rocketships Going Up by Gift of Gab in 2004 and Self Destruction by I Self Divine in 2005. He appeared on multiple songs from Jake One's 2008 debut album White Van Music, which he also mixed. In 2009, he produced the album Rejuvination for Abstract Rude.

In 2011, he formed Sta Hi Brothers with rapper Maneak B. The duo has released 5 albums. In 2014, he produced "Big Rich Town" by 50 Cent and Joe, which is the opening theme of the television series Power. He released a series of solo projects titled Bornday in the 2010s, followed by the Flips series in the 2020s. Additional artists he has produced songs for includes Black Sheep, Boom Bap Project, Chali 2na, De La Soul, Gabriel Teodros, One Be Lo, Planet Asia, Redman, Strange Fruit Project and Young Buck. He is currently employed as a DJ at KEXP.

== Legacy and influence ==
He is highly regarded in the Seattle hip-hop scene and has been credited as an influence to many artists such as Ishmael Butler, Macklemore, Gabriel Teodros, and Thig Nat of The Physics. Larry Mizell Jr. of The Stranger said "If one man was to represent Seattle in a worldwide hip-hop Olympics, I can think of no better personage than producer/MC/DJ Derrick 'Vitamin D' Brown." Mike Clark of KCMU expressed "the Ghetto Chilldren, and the entire Tribal Productions collective as a whole, were the most important thing to hip-hop in the Seattle area in the '90s."

Seattle's Museum of History and Industry (MOHAI) curated and showcased an exhibit called The Legacy of Seattle Hip Hop from September 19, 2015, through May 1, 2016. One section featured mixing stations that played tracks by Vitamin D and Jake One, as well as letting visitors interact with the tracks by using the mixing boards.

== Discography ==
=== Solo ===
- Table Manners 2 (1999)
- No Good EP (2003)
- Funk On Sight (2010)
- Bornday EP (2010)
- Hip Hop Kitchen Mixtape (2011)
- Bornday 2 (2014)
- Bornday 3 (2018)
- Mama's Basement (2019)
- Flips (2020)
- Flips Vol. 2 (2020)
- Flips 3 An American Tale (2021)
- Auto Reverse (Flips Vol. 4) (2021)
- Ultimate Broken Beats (2023)
- Bornday 5.0. (2025)

=== Collaborations ===
- Intro to the Central (with Narcotik and Topspin) (1995)
- Mi Vida Negra (with Khalil Crisis) (2001)
- C.I. (with Central Intelligence) (2001)
- Audio Royal (with Nique) (2004)
- Backpack Wax (with J. Pinder) (2007)
- Can't Get Enough (with Darrius) (2008)
- Rejuvination (with Abstract Rude) (2009)
- Dear Abbey, The Lost Letters Mixtape (with Abstract Rude) (2012)
- Melancholy Hopeful (with Marcus D) (2012)
- Rusty Bladez (with Libretto) (2022)

=== with Ghetto Chilldren ===
- Monologs and Soliloquys For Your Mom EP (1993)
- 90's Unreleased, Demos & Rare Tracks (2021)

=== with Sta Hi Brothers ===
- Christmas Trees (2011)
- F#%k a Valentine (2011)
- High On Wax (2015)
- Stocking Stuffer (2015)
- Eggnog and Hennessy (2020)

=== Production credits ===
- "Entafunktroplis (Remix)", "Seasick", "I Like", "Non Stop", "Anotha Booty Call", "Booty Call Pick Up" and "Outro" from Entafunktroplis 98206 by Mr. DeRoxs (1998)
- "Comrade" from Comrade by Silent Lambs Project (1998)
- "Game Trump Tight" from Eyez on the Prize by Various Artists (1999)
- "Emerald City", "Wetlands", "Audio Visual", "Papa", "Ascension", "Full Circle", "Invaded Lands" and "Livication" from Stolen Lives by Source of Labor (2000)
- "Who's That" and "Take It to the Stage" from Circumstance Dictates by Boom Bap Project (2001)
- "Slicks Box", "Midwest Biz" and "Tiger Woods" from Respect the Life by Musab (2002)
- "Hip Hop" from The Opening by The Planets (2002)
- "The Aftermath" from 911 Amerika by Various Artists (2002)
- "Apples & Oranges" from Night Owls 2: Sleep Therapy by Various Artists (2003)
- "Chips to a Cell", "Pimp of the Year" and "You Need a Thug" from The Sport-N-Life Compilation Vol. 1 by Various Artists (2003)
- "Do the Damn Thing" from Days Off by De La Soul (2004)
- "Way of the Light", "Stardust", "The Writz", "To Know You", "Real MCs", "Ride On" and "Just Because" from 4th Dimensional Rocketships Going Up by Gift of Gab (2004)
- "Upside Down" from The Grand Opening by Planet Asia (2004)
- "Break Bread", "Real Talk" and "Too Easy (Layover Outro)" from Layover by Encore (2004)
- "No Good" from Hands On by DJ Nu-Mark (2004)
- "Come On" from Fish Market by Chali 2na (2004)
- "I Am", "Live in the Moment", "Sex Sex Sex" and "Actions" from Self Destruction by I Self Divine (2005)
- "Live" from Cristopher by Sleep (2005)
- "Waitin", "Long Way", "Dedicated to Music", "Wish I Hadn't Told You", "Now What" and "Bigger Than You" from Choklate by Choklate (2005)
- "Wyle Out" and "Reprogram" from Reprogram by Boom Bap Project (2005)
- "Battles With Self (100% Freestyle)", "Rise" and "It Ain't a Game" from S.P.I.T. - Spiritual Poetry Ignites Thought by Supernatural (2005)
- "Trade (Remix)", "Total Control", "Wyle Out", "Get With This" from The Welcome to Seattle Mixtape by Boom Bap Project (2005)
- "Rules" from The Shakedown by Boom Bap Project (2005)
- "Get With This" from Over Easy by Dirty Circus (2006)
- "Can We Fall In Love Again" from Somebody To Love by Darien Brockington (2006)
- "Cocoacabana" from Pleaze Believe by Neezie Pleaze (2006)
- "Pinball" from The Healing by Strange Fruit Project (2006)
- "U Mean I Don't", "Whodat?", "Novokane" and "Novokane Groove" from 8WM/Novakane by Black Sheep (2006)
- "Pimp Nutz" from Red Gone Wild: Thee Album by Redman (2007)
- "Haters" from Buck the World by Young Buck (2007)
- "No Surprise" from Gutterfly by Lifesavas (2007)
- "That Pay" from Phar From Home by Faculty (2007)
- "Don't Sleep" from The R.E.B.I.R.T.H. by One Be Lo (2007)
- "Life Lessons" from Crem De La Creme by T. Calmese (2008)
- "So Crazy " from Fish Outta Water by Chali 2na (2009)
- "Suns Out", "Call It Good (Sorry)", "To Whom It May Concern", "The Tea", "One'a Y'all", "Pretty", "6.8 Billion" and "The Blues" from To Whom It May Concern… by Choklate (2009)
- "Re:Born" and "Hello Karma" from Splitting Image by Kam Moye (2009)
- "What I Do", "Keep On Going", "Blow the Trump" and "I Believe In You" from Ali'Yah by D. Black (2009)
- "New Hope" from Hear Me Out by Yirim Seck
- "Gimme Gimme (Vitamin D Mix)" from Sleepless In Seattle / Cap City On My Mind by Maliq (2009)
- "Let's Get It" from Pinky Ring Muzik by Bigg Steele (2009)
- "Three Words" from Code Red EP by J. Pinder (2010)
- "Hi Def", "Winners Circle" and "Rules of the Game" from Audio/Visual by Fes Roc (2010)
- "Unlearning Intro" from The Unlearning EP by Truthlive (2010)
- "Made a Difference", "Lay You Down" and "Travel the World" from Gimme All Mine by Kokane (2010)
- "Say Dat", "Don't Worry", "No Stadic" and "SloFlo" from Sweatsuit & Churchshoes by Candidt (2010)
- "National Treasure" and "The Bar" from Walk Into a Bar by Promethius Brown and Bambu (2011)
- "Star Warz" from Thank H.E.R. Now by Rapsody (2011)
- "The G.O.A.T." from L.A.B.O.R. by One Be Lo (2011)
- "Pilgrimage" from Careless by J Pinder (2012)
- "The Origin of Urban Crisis" and "Exist to Remain" from The Sound of Low Class Amerika by I Self Divine (2012)
- "Get Right" from Speed of Life by Evitan (Jarobi White and Dres) (2012)
- "If These Walls Could Talk" from Crooked Straights by Vursatyl (2015)
- "Dolla Bill" from Menace is Money by D Menace (2015)
- "Muevete" from Living as a Mad by Cyphalliance (2016)
- "Deion Sanders" and "Ink Drips" from Return Flight by Boom Bap Project (2021)
- "Spacetime" and "For Us, By Us" from From the Ashes of Our Homes by Gabriel Teodros (2023)
- "Bigger" from The Grind Date (reissue) by De La Soul (2025)

=== Guest appearances ===
- "I Wanna Win", "Elevate", "I'm An MC" (with Ghetto Chilldren) and "Shapelee Utopia" from Untranslated Prescriptions by Various Artists (1995)
- "Court's In Session" (with Ghetto Chilldren) from 14 Fathoms Deep by Various Artists (1996)
- "Who's Listening", "N's Don't L", "Equilibrium" (with Ghetto Chilldren) and "Earth Girlz R Ez" from Do the Math by Various Artists (1997)
- "Hip Hop Was?" (with Ghetto Chilldren) from Classic Elements by Various Artists (1998)
- "Who Knows?" from Director's Cut EP by The Shinin' (2000)
- "Young Tender" (with Ghetto Chilldren) from Evolution of Hip-Hop by Various Artists (2004)
- "Roll Call" from The Shakedown by Boom Bap Project (2005)
- "Can't Truss Em", "Bad News" and "Poverty Paradise" from Backpack Wax by J. Pinder (2007)
- "Tumbleweedz" from Unearthed by Abstract Giants (2007)
- "R.I.P." and "Home" from White Van Music by Jake One (2008)
- "Shut Up" from Die Already by The Gigantics (2008)
- "Keep On Going" from Ali'Yah by D. Black (2009)
- "Filthy" from All Eye See by Illuminati Congo (2011)
- "Atonement" from Simply Complex by Marcus D (2014)
- "Too High" from Peanuts To An Elephant by DZ (2020)

=== Mixing credits ===
- Lovework by Gabriel Teodros (2007)
- Tobacco Road by Common Market (2008)
- White Van Music by Jake One (2008)
- This Is It by Frame (2008)
- Cinemetropolis by Blue Scholars (2011)
- Earthbound by CopperWire (2012)
- Digital Wildlife by The Physics (2013)
- Another Day in the Life Of… by Bop Alloy (Substantial and Marcus D) (2014)
- Simply Complex by Marcus D (2014)
- Eye of the Beholder by Porter Ray (2018)
- Lone Wolf by Marcus D (2019)
- Bar Tough by Marcus D and Pismo (2021)
- The Stimulus Package 2 by Jake One and Freeway (2024)
