= Obelisk Movements =

Studio album by Micranots
- Released: October 31, 2000
- Genre: Hip hop, alternative hip hop
- Length: 73:49
- Label: Sub Verse Music
- Producer: DJ Kool Akiem, Ogami Don Itto

Micranots chronology
Return of the Travellahs (1996)	Obelisk Movements (2000)	The Emperor & the Assassin (2004)

Professional ratings
Review scores
Source	Rating
Cleve Scene	Favorable
Exclaim!	Favorable
Fifth Element	Favorable
RapReviews	8/10

Obelisk Movements is the second studio album by American hip hop duo Micranots, consisting of rapper I Self Devine and producer DJ Kool Akiem. It was released October 31, 2000 on Sub Verse Music.

== Music ==
The album is mostly produced by DJ Kool Akiem, with one track produced by Ogami Don Itto. Guest appearances include Buddah Tye, Marq Spekt, Stahhr, Brane, Ekundayo, Luz, Maat Ra and Saber.

== Track listing ==
All tracks are produced by DJ Kool Akiem except where noted.

No.	Title	Producer	Length
1.	"Intro"		1:31
2.	"Pitch Black Ark"		4:28
3.	"Preparations"		4:53
4.	"Culture"		4:39
5.	"Balance" (featuring Buddah Tye)		4:10
6.	"Monuments"		2:20
7.	"Analyze"		5:01
8.	"Illegal Busyness"		4:33
9.	"Queen Supreme"		3:51
10.	"Critical"		3:29
11.	"Visualistic" (featuring Marq Spekt & Stahhr)		5:04
12.	"M.O.V.E"	Ogami Don Itto	4:12
13.	"Mother's Day"		5:14
14.	"Good Heavens"		1:13
15.	"The Willie Lynch" (featuring Brane, Ekundayo, Luz, Maat Ra & Saber)		5:38
16.	"Iconoclastic"		4:39
17.	"Sun Situations"		4:34
18.	"Exodus"		4:20
