= The Emperor & the Assassin =

Studio album by Micranots
- Released: February 3, 2004
- Genre: Hip hop, alternative hip hop
- Length: 74:45
- Label: Rhymesayers Entertainment
- Producer: DJ Kool Akiem

Micranots chronology
Obelisk Movements (2000)	The Emperor & the Assassin (2004)

Professional ratings
Review scores
Source	Rating
Fifth Element	Favorable

The Emperor & the Assassin is the third studio album by American hip hop duo Micranots, consisting of I Self Devine and DJ Kool Akiem. It was released February 3, 2004 on Rhymesayers Entertainment.

== Music ==
The album is entirely produced by DJ Kool Akiem. Guest appearances include Slug of Atmosphere, Muja Messiah and Malcolm.

== Background ==
When first creating the album, I Self Devine and DJ Kool Akiem had in mind to involve the album into present day news, and the name of the record was first named The Emperor & the Terrorist in response to the 9/11 attacks. However, the group decided to change the name when getting closer to release as to avoid any controversy.

== Track listing ==
No.	Title	Length
1.	"The Intro"	1:38
2.	"Glorious"	5:11
3.	"The Origin" (featuring Muja Messiah)	5:31
4.	"Our Universe"	4:31
5.	"Steel Toe vs. The Rookie" (featuring Slug)	5:17
6.	"Heat"	5:37
7.	"Ms. Gemini"	4:46
8.	"Eight Days"	6:29
9.	"Amerikalogy"	4:35
10.	"One Eye Titled"	5:51
11.	"Elegant Ruggedness"	3:50
12.	"Neutralize"	5:18
13.	"Violence"	3:23
14.	"Off Beats" (featuring Malcolm)	4:32
15.	"Classic Literal"	5:41
16.	"Out"	2:35
