= Self Destruction =

Self Destruction may refer to:

- Self-destructive behavior, behavior that is harmful or potentially harmful towards the person who engages in the behavior
- "Self Destruction" (song), a 1989 song supporting the Stop the Violence Movement
- Self Destruction (album), a 2005 album by I Self Devine
