= Jonathan Moore (musician) =

American rapper (1969–2017)

- Also known as: Wordsayer, J. Moore, DJ Word Sayer
- Born: April 21, 1969; Seattle, Washington, U.S.
- Died: March 8, 2017 (aged 47) Seattle, Washington, U.S.
- Genres: Hip hop, rap, indie rock
- Occupations: Producer, rapper, musician, DJ
- Instruments: Vocals, production
- Years active: 1992–2017
- Labels: Jasiri Media Group, Sub Verse Music

Jonathan Moore (April 21, 1969 – March 8, 2017), also known by his stage name, Wordsayer, was a rapper, DJ and producer born in Seattle, Washington. Known as Seattle's "hip-hop ambassador" and "cultural mayor", Moore was influential in the Northwest hip-hop scene and founded the group Source of Labor in 1989.

== Early life ==
Moore grew up in the Columbia City neighborhood of Seattle and attended Roosevelt High School. After he graduated in 1987, he moved to Atlanta, Georgia to attend Morehouse College. Moore worked at Sevananda, a natural grocery store while he attended Morehouse College. When he moved back to Seattle after college in Atlanta, he rented a house in the Central District with his friend, designer Upendo Tookas (a.k.a. Negus I), and friend, DJ Kamikaze, who also changed the hip-hop game in Seattle.

== Career ==
Moore, Tookas and Kamikaze began performing at Langston Hughes Performing Arts Center in the Central District as Source of Labor (SOL) in 1989.

SOL (with Derrick Brown (a.k.a. Vitamin D) replacing Kamikaze in 1997), began the music label, Jasiri Media Group, although Jasiri began as a collective in 1993. Also in '93 more popular venues and clubs downtown were booked with grunge shows and gangster rap was big at that time, making it a challenge for SOL to gain footing. As Wordsayer, Moore was known for his politically conscious verse and life. SOL and Jasiri were the center of Seattle's second wave of hip hop in the early 90s, the first wave being Nastymix Recording artist Sir-Mix-a-Lot.

Moore is credited with bringing hip-hop into the mainstream in Seattle and bringing notoriety to the city's hip hop scene. Not only did he move hip hop into downtown Seattle, but to help sustain his effort, he also began booking and promoting other nationally notable acts for the same downtown clubs. He brought such artists as The Roots in 1995, Blackalicious and Saul Williams (for whom Moore managed a national tour in 2001).

Moore also fought for all-ages venues in Seattle. The Teen Dance Ordinance of the early 1990s required a venue have one million dollar liability insurance and hire two off duty police officers in order to put on a show, making it nearly impossible for under aged kids to see music live. Moore was part of the movement to overturn that law in part by hosting Sure Shot Sundays at a local café/laundromat where Macklemore first performed at age 15.

Moore met Chaka Mkali while visiting his alma mater and connected him to the scrappy and burgeoning Seattle hip-hop scene which led to national attention and touring groups for the city. In 2000 Source of Labor played a show with Mos Def and local groups, Black Anger and Beyond Reality for Dr. Martin Luther King Jr.'s birthday at the University of Washington's Hub Ballroom co-hosted by Student Hip-Hop Organization of Washington (the SHOW).

Source of Labor disbanded in 2004 to focus on individual projects. Moore continued managing other emerging artists to provide them what he missed when he was new to the scene. He managed many third wave Seattle hip hop groups such as THEESatisfaction and Shabazz Palaces. From 2004 to 2010, he ran an annual beat battle competition with Vitamin D titled Big Tune, which was sponsored by Red Bull.

KUBE 93, Seattles mainstream pop station featured Moore and DJ Hyphen co-hosting Sunday Night Sound Sessions.

Moore worked until the end of his life. He was working on the video for rapper Brother Ali's "Own Light (What Hearts Are For)" in which Moore's sister, Jen, dances in celebration of his life (filmed the day after he died). The video is dedicated in his memory.

== Personal life ==
Moore taught creative writing at Franklin High School. Upendo Moore, his oldest son, whom he had with his ex partner in life and music, Erika Kylea White (MC Kylea of Beyond Reality), began following in his parents' musical footsteps at 18 months old, playing the drums, and at 4, onstage with the Roots. His younger son, Miles, he had with his ex partner, Caitlin Brower. Jonathan Moore died on March 8, 2017, of kidney failure at age 47.

== Discography ==
=== Albums ===
Year	Album	Artist	Credits	Label
2001	Stolen Lives	Source of Labor	Producer, engineer, lyricist, arranger, Mixing, Keyboards	Subversemusic
2001	Full Circle EP	Source of Labor	Producer, engineer, lyricist, arranger, Mixing, Keyboards	Subversemusic
2001	JMG: Word Sound Power	Various Artists	Engineer, lyricist, Mixing	Jasiri Media Group
1999	Table Manners 2	Vitamin D	Lyricist	Tribal Music Inc.
1998	Classic Elements	Various Artists	Lyricist	K Records
1997	Choked Up	Sharpshooters	Vocals (background)	Shadow Records
1996	Balance	Source of Labor	Producer, engineer, lyricist, arranger, Mixing, Keyboards	Jasiri Media Group
1996	Do the Math	Various Artists	Performer, Primary Artist	Tribal Music Inc
1996	14 Fathoms Deep	Various Artists	Lyricist	Loosegroove Records
