= Blue Scholars (album) =

Studio album by Blue Scholars
- Released: 2004, re-released in 2005
- Genre: Alternative hip hop
- Length: 55:49
- Label: Self-released
- Producer: Sabzi

Blue Scholars chronology
Blue Scholars (2004)	The Long March EP (2005)

Alternate album covers
- Original Cover

Blue Scholars is the self-titled debut release by Blue Scholars, a Seattle-based hip-hop duo. It was originally only available in the Seattle area in 2004 before being given a national release in 2005.

The 2004 release of the album contained tracks 2–11 (the original release had a different introduction, track 1, called "Solstice Intro") and came in a jewel case with a cover resembling a spiral-bound notebook. This version of the album was voted "Best Album of 2004" by the Seattle Weekly.

The 2005 release of the album added three new tracks to the end of the album: "The Ave", "Life & Debt", and "No Rest for the Weary". The re-release came in a digipak-style case with revised cover art, featuring a silhouette of the Seattle skyline with the band's more common graffiti tag style logo.

A video for the track "Freewheelin" was produced in the summer of 2004. It features Geo and Sabzi walking with an increasing group of followers through a number of Seattle neighborhoods, including the International District, Beacon Hill, and Capitol Hill. The final scene of the video features the duo performing in Hing Hay Park to their crowd of followers. The video is available on the 2005 version of the album and can be viewed on YouTube.

== Track listing ==
=== 2004 Pacific Northwest release ===
1. "Solstice Intro" (1:58)
2. "Blue School" (4:25)
3. "Bruise Brothers" (2:51)
4. "Motion Movement" (3:44)
5. "selfPortrait" (4:15)
6. "Freewheelin" (3:21)
7. "The Inkwell" (4:54)
8. "Burnt Offering" (5:05)
9. "Evening Chai" (4:17) (the spoken word portion after the song is from the film Three Kings)
10. "Blink" (3:54)
11. "Sagaba" (4:16)

=== 2005 national release ===
1. "Solstice: Reintroduction" (3:02)
2. "Blue School" (4:25)
3. "Bruise Brothers" (2:51)
4. "Motion Movement" (3:44)
5. "selfPortrait" (4:15)
6. "Freewheelin" (3:21)
7. "The Inkwell" (4:54)
8. "Burnt Offering" (5:05)
9. "Evening Chai" (4:17) (the spoken word portion after the song is from the film Three Kings)
10. "Blink" (3:54)
11. "Sagaba" (4:16)
12. "The Ave" (3:02)
13. "Life & Debt" (3:07)
14. "No Rest for the Weary" (5:36)
- Bonus: "Freewheelin" music video (directed by Marty Martin)

== Credits ==
- Sabzi - beats, producer
- Geologic - rhymes
- Liza Danger ( Danger Danger Design) - art direction, design
- Barry Corliss - mastering

=== "Freewheelin" video credits ===
- Marty Martin - director, director of photography, editor, special effects
- James Maki - co-producer, first assistant director
- Andrei Zia Mohajerjasbi - second assistant director
- Christopher Gambol - grip, production assistant
