= Eyes on the Prize (disambiguation) =

Eyes on the Prize is a 14-hour American documentary film series about the US Civil Rights Movement.

Eyes on the Prize may refer to:

- Eyes on the Prize (album), a 2003 album by the hip hop group 3 The Hard Way
- "Eyes on the Prize", a 1994 episode of the American animated series The Critic
- "Keep Your Eyes on the Prize", an American folk song
- "Eyes on the Prize", a song by Sara Groves on the 2011 album Invisible Empires
- Eyez on the Prize, a 1999 hip hop compilation album
