= Rejuvenation (Abstract Rude album) =

Studio album by Abstract Rude
- Released: April 7, 2009
- Genre: Hip-hop
- Length: 52:06
- Label: Rhymesayers Entertainment
- Producer: Vitamin D

Abstract Rude chronology
A Coat of Gold P.A.I.N.T. (2008)	Rejuvenation (2009)	Steel Making Trax: The Export (2010)

Singles from Rejuvenation
- 1. "Rejuvenation" Released: April 13, 2009

Rejuvenation is a studio album by Los Angeles-based rapper Abstract Rude and Seattle-based producer Vitamin D. It was released by Rhymesayers Entertainment on April 7, 2009.

== Critical reception ==
Professional ratings
Review scores
Source	Rating
HipHopDX	3.0/5
RapReviews.com	8.5/10
Scratched Vinyl	7/10
Spin	4/10 stars
Sputnikmusic	3.0/5
XLR8R	8/10

Andres Tardio of HipHopDX gave the album a 3.0 out of 5, commenting that "[Abstract Rude's] flow has always been a high point of his emceeing capabilities and this album highlights this." Rob Geary of XLR8R gave the album an 8 out of 10 and said, "Seattle's Vitamin D produces with an ear for scratchy funk guitars, low-ride tempos, and dusty drums that vibrate in tune with the grain of Abstract's signature voice."

== Track listing ==
No.	Title	Length
1.	"Hip Hop Ryde"	2:37
2.	"Rejuvenation"	4:21
3.	"Nuff Fire"	3:14
4.	"The Conch"	3:43
5.	"Thynk Eye Can (Haiku d'Etat Mix)" (featuring Aceyalone and Myka 9)	3:29
6.	"TV Show"	2:48
7.	"Sadly Ever After"	5:00
8.	"Tomorry"	3:09
9.	"Diggin' It?"	3:10
10.	"Aaron, Ab, Abbey"	1:58
11.	"RSVP (Wanna Party)"	2:41
12.	"Man Down"	3:16
13.	"Is What It Is"	5:03
14.	"Parables"	2:02
15.	"Thynk Eye Can (Blowedian Next Generation Mix)" (hidden track; featuring Sahtyre, Alpha MC, Busdriver, Nocando, Open Mike Eagle, and Dumbfoundead)	4:15
