= Source of Labor =

American hip hop group

- Origin: Atlanta, Georgia
- Genres: hip hop, rap
- Years active: 1990–2004
- Labels: Sub Verse Music; Jasiri Music Group
- Past members: Wordsayer 1990-2004; Upendo Tookas (a.k.a. Negus I) 1990-2004; Joel Lozano (a.k.a. DJ Kamikaze) 1990-1997; Igbnifa Fadoyamin (a.k.a. Blahzey Blah) 1993-1996

Source of Labor was a rap band formed in 1990 in Atlanta, Georgia, and included Wordsayer, Negus I, Blahzey Blah, and DJ Kamikaze.

== History ==
Upendo "Negus I" Tookas went to high school in Seattle, and graduated in 1988. He was accepted to Morehouse College in Atlanta, and entered as a Freshman in the fall of 1988. Jonathan "Wordsayer" Moore became friends with Negus I in Seattle in the summer of 1989, then Negus I returned to Morehouse for his Sophomore year. Near the end of 1989, Wordsayer moved to Atlanta. Beginning in 1990, Wordsayer attended Atlanta Metropolitan State College. Wordsayer and Negus I met Joel "DJ Kamikaze" Lozano in Atlanta and, as Wordsayer told writer Ifé Thomas for Urban Agenda newspaper, "We got together in 1990 in Atlanta." Wordsayer was accepted to Morehouse in January 1992 and attended one semester there as a Sophomore.

The three members of Source Of Labor moved from Atlanta to Seattle in late 1992. According to Wordsayer in Urban Agenda, "We really decided in the summer of '92 to head back to Seattle, and we all got back that fall in October." They soon began performing at Langston Hughes Performing Arts Center in Seattle's Central District. Source of Labor began a collective that evolved into a record label called Jasiri Media Group. Igbnifa "Blahzey Blah" Fadoyamin joined Source Of Labor during this time. Their first show in downtown Seattle was in 1993 at the Crocodile Cafe.

Source of Labor was loosely associated with the female rap act Beyond Reality, whose lead, MC Kylea, was Wordsayer's partner and mother of his first child. Both performed at the all-day Rap Festival (featuring 30 or more of the top regional rap/hip-hop acts of that time). The event, much like Lollapolooza, was strictly Rap and was called "Phunky Phat 95." It took place at the Evergreen State College during the summer of 1995. Source of Labor performed at Seattle's arts festival, Bumbershoot, and inspired Macklemore to become a rapper. Wordsayer later gave Macklemore his first show at age 15. Source of Labor has been an inspiration to many other artists like Nardwuar the Human Serviette, Ryan Lewis, Strath Shepard, and Thee Satisfaction.

Source of Labor's contributions to Northwest hip hop were extremely influential in shaping post-Nastmix hip-hop. They were part of Seattle's second hip hop movement, the first wave centering around Nastymix recording artist Sir-Mix-a-Lot. Some credit the group's front man, Wordsayer, with personally moving hip-hop out of Seattle's Central District and into the rest of the city.

In 1996, Blahzey Blah left Source Of Labor and joined Jungle Creations. In 1997 DJ Kamikaze also left the group. DJ Vitamin D from Tribal Music Inc. often DJed for the group's live performances, and also produced some beats for the group, but never became a member of Source Of Labor. In a 2020 interview on YouTube titled "Cake Talk Ep. 3 Ft. Vitamin D", he categorically stated that he was never a member of Source Of Labor.

Source of Labor disbanded in 2004 and the artists went on to focus on their individual projects. Wordsayer continued producing and taught poetry at Franklin High School. Vitamin D continued his rapping and production career. DJ Kamikaze changed his name to Jahnya after leaving the group.

Wordsayer, born Johnny Lee Moore II, died of kidney failure in March 2017.

== Discography ==
=== Albums, EPs, and Singles ===
Year	Album	Label
2001	Stolen Lives	Subversemusic
Year	EP	Label
2001	Full Circle EP	Subversemusic
1995	Sureshot Singles EP	Jasiri Media Group
1995	Source Of Labor (Cassette)	Jasiri Media Group
Year	Single	Label
1999	Wetlands 12"	Jasiri Media Group
1997	Overstandings 12"	Jasiri Media Group
1996	Balance CD	Jasiri Media Group

=== Guest Appearances, Compilations, and B-Sides ===
Year	Album	Artist	Label	Song
1999	Table Manners 2	Vitamin D	Tribal Music Inc.	(freestyle)
1998	Classic Elements	Various Artists	K Records	Aunt Anna
1997	Word Sound Power	Various Artists	Jasiri Media Group	(8 tracks)
1996	Do the Math	Various Artists	Tribal Music Inc	The Shining
1996	14 Fathoms Deep	Various Artists	Loosegroove Records	Cornbread
Year	12"	Artist	Label	Song
1999	I Reality	Beyond Reality	Jasiri Media Group	Raindrops
