= Hing Hay Park =

Park in Seattle, Washington, U.S.

- 慶喜公園
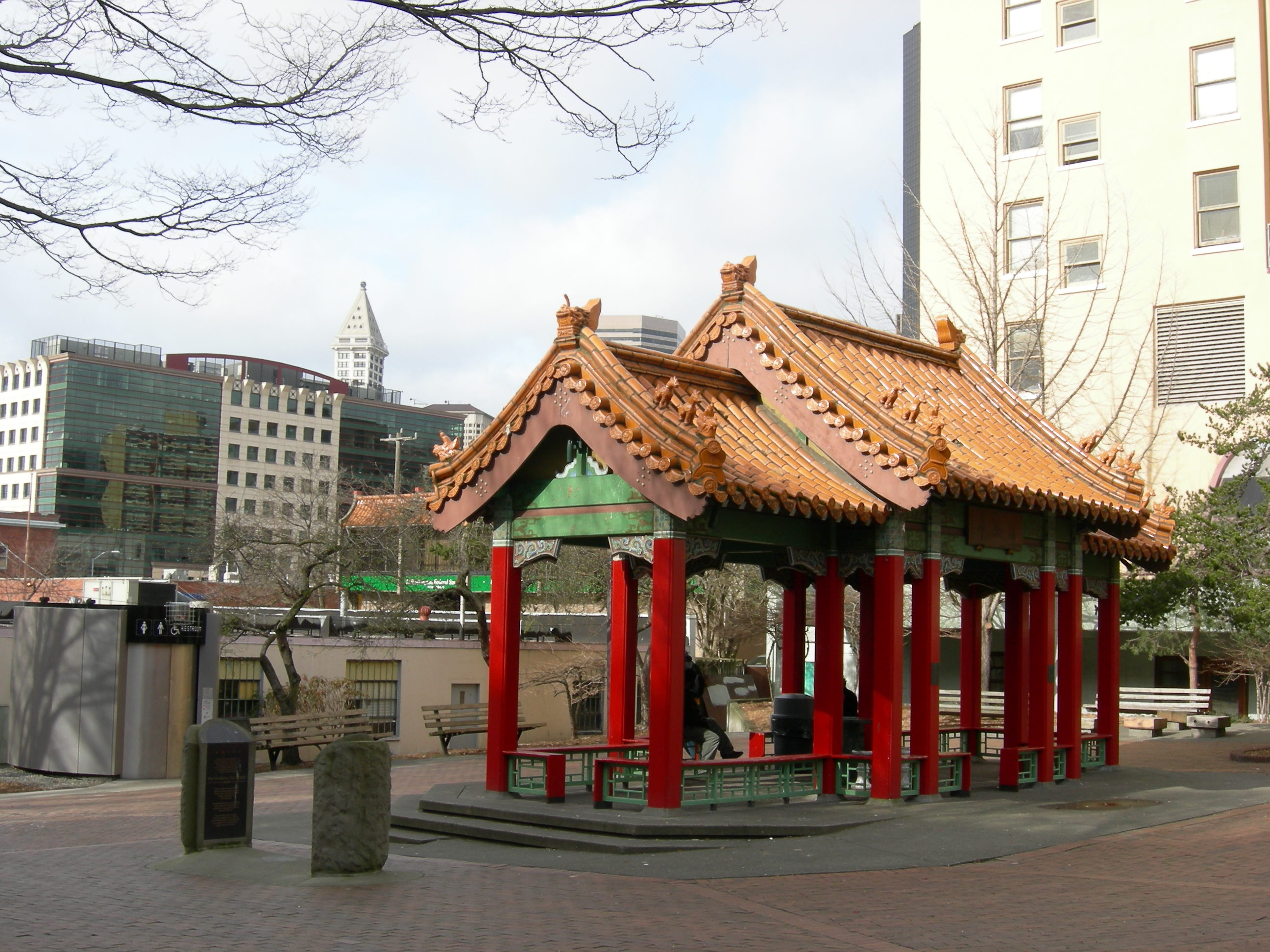
- Looking roughly northwest from Hing Hay Park
- Interactive map of Hing Hay Park
- Location: 423 Maynard Ave S.
- Nearest city: Seattle, Washington
- Coordinates: 47°35′54.8″N 122°19′31.3″W
- Area: 0.64 acres (0.26 ha)
- Created: 1973
- Designer: Sakuma, James, and Peterson
- Owner: City of Seattle
- Website: seattle.gov/parks/find/parks/hing-hay-park

Hing Hay Park
- Traditional Chinese: 慶喜公園
- Simplified Chinese: 庆喜公园
- Literal meaning: Celebrate Happiness Public Park (figuratively, "Park for Pleasurable Gatherings")
- Hanyu Pinyin: Qìngxǐ Gōngyuán
- Yale Romanization: Hinghéi Gūngyún
- Jyutping: Hing^{3}hei^{2} Gung^{1}jyun^{2}

Hing Hay Park (Chinese: 慶喜公園) is a 0.64-acre (2,600 m^{2}) public park in the Chinatown–International District neighborhood of downtown Seattle, Washington, United States. The park is located on the north side of South King Street between 6th and Maynard avenues, east of Union Station and the Historic Chinatown Gate. It was built in 1973 and includes a pavilion, community games, and two gateways.

The park is a noncontributing property within the Seattle Chinatown Historic District described in 1986. Both are within the Seattle Chinatown International District established by City Ordinance 119297 in 1988.

== Features and events ==
After its expansion, the park occupies the south half-block north of S. King Street, between 6th Avenue S. (on the west) and Maynard Avenue S. (on the east). The original portion of the park occupies the quarter block at the corner of S. King Street and Maynard Avenue S.

The original park has an authentic pavilion in the center, along with benches and chess tables. Placed on a diagonal in the southeast corner is a small hanging bulletin board with its own tiled roof. One side contains an outdated map of the district and the other is for community news. Its placement is according to principles of feng shui. Parallel placement would have blocked the qi from flowing into the businesses on the opposite side of the street.

There is a large mural dominated by a dragon and featuring scenes of railroad construction, the Kingdome, and the King Street Station clock tower on the wall of the neighboring Bush-Asia Center, painted by John Woo in 1977. In addition, the park features a memorial cenotaph for ten Chinese-American veterans who were killed during World War II. The local American Legion Cathay Post No. 186 holds an annual Memorial Day ceremony there.

Tai chi classes and free music are presented in the summer. The annual Dragon Fest also centers on Hing Hay Park.

== History ==
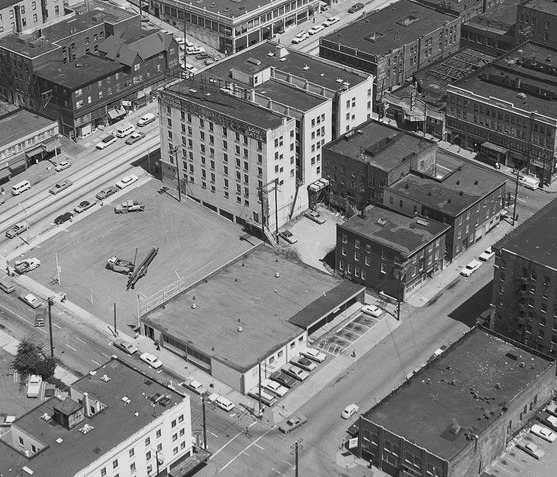
Aerial view of the block containing what would become Hing Hay Park (1969), facing northeast. The tall E-shaped Bush Hotel is on the northeast corner; the three small buildings that would be demolished to clear the land for Hing Hay Park are in the southeast corner, and the post office (demolished decades later to expand the park) is in the southwest corner.

Funds to purchase the buildings and land at the corner of Maynard and King were made available by the Forward Thrust bond initiative, approved by voters in 1968. During the planning phase, the proposed park was generically named the International District Mini Park. The original park space was designed by the landscape architecture firm of Sakuma, James, and Peterson, led by S.K. Sakuma; the land was previously occupied by the Specie Bank of Seattle, built in 1911, and the park, originally 0.33 acres (1,300 m^{2}), was completed in 1973.

The pavilion and furniture were donated by the then Mayor of Taipei after a visit to Seattle in the early 1970s. He met with then King County Council member Ruby Chow, who explained to him that the city had purchased and torn down the condemned buildings on the land, proposing a park instead, but it needed to be as care free as possible because the city could not afford ongoing maintenance costs. After discussions with Ruby Chow, the mayor of Taipei offered to donate the brickwork, pavilion and bulletin board from his own private funds. He sent over a crew of trained workers to aid in its construction; the pavilion was completed in 1975.

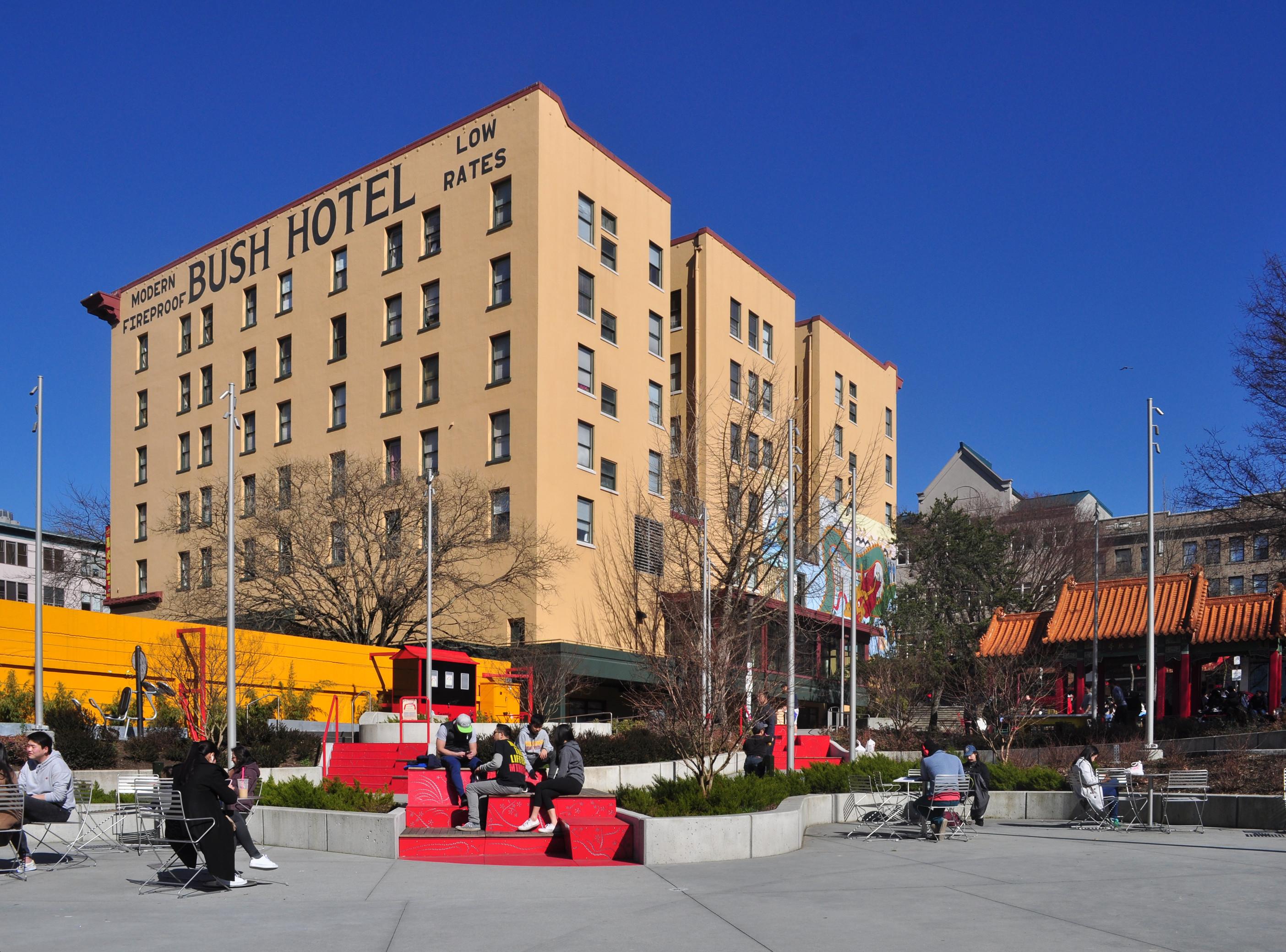
Bush Hotel and expanded Hing Hay Park (March 2018)

=== Expansion ===
Using funds from a voter-passed parks levy, the city Parks Department purchased the former post office on the west side of the existing park in 2007, intending to demolish it to nearly double the size of Hing Hay Park, adding 0.31 acres (14,000 sq ft; 1,300 m^{2}). The landmark feature of the design proposal was an artistic gateway for the new entrance on the southwest corner of the expanded park. Other features of the new design included seating, landscaping inspired by terraced rice paddies, and performance spaces (including the landmark gateway). The Friends of Hing Hay Park, formed in 2012, met regularly with the internationally known design team of SvR (from Seattle) and Turenscape (based in Beijing).

Construction of the expansion project began on January 6, 2016, shortly after the contract was awarded to WS Contractors; the old post office was demolished by February. The Hing Hay Park Expansion opened on June 29, 2017. Although the park was largely complete by April, the artistic gateway and light poles caused the park's opening to be delayed.

The large artistic gateway, constructed of perforated red metal and measuring 20 by 70 feet (6.1 by 21.3 m), was designed and fabricated offsite by Studio Fifty50. It was installed in February 2018. A celebration was held on March 24, 2018, to mark the completion of the expansion project. Studio Fifty50 also designed and fabricated the perforated red metal stair risers used elsewhere in the park expansion.

== In media ==
It is mentioned in a Blue Scholars song, "Talk Story" from The Long March EP.

"Hing Hay Market" is a location within the open world of Infamous Second Son. Sucker Punch Productions's version of Seattle's Chinatown is overall greatly exaggerated and Hing Hay market appears to be more of an evolution of the real Hing Hay park rather than a 100% accurate representation.

== Gallery ==
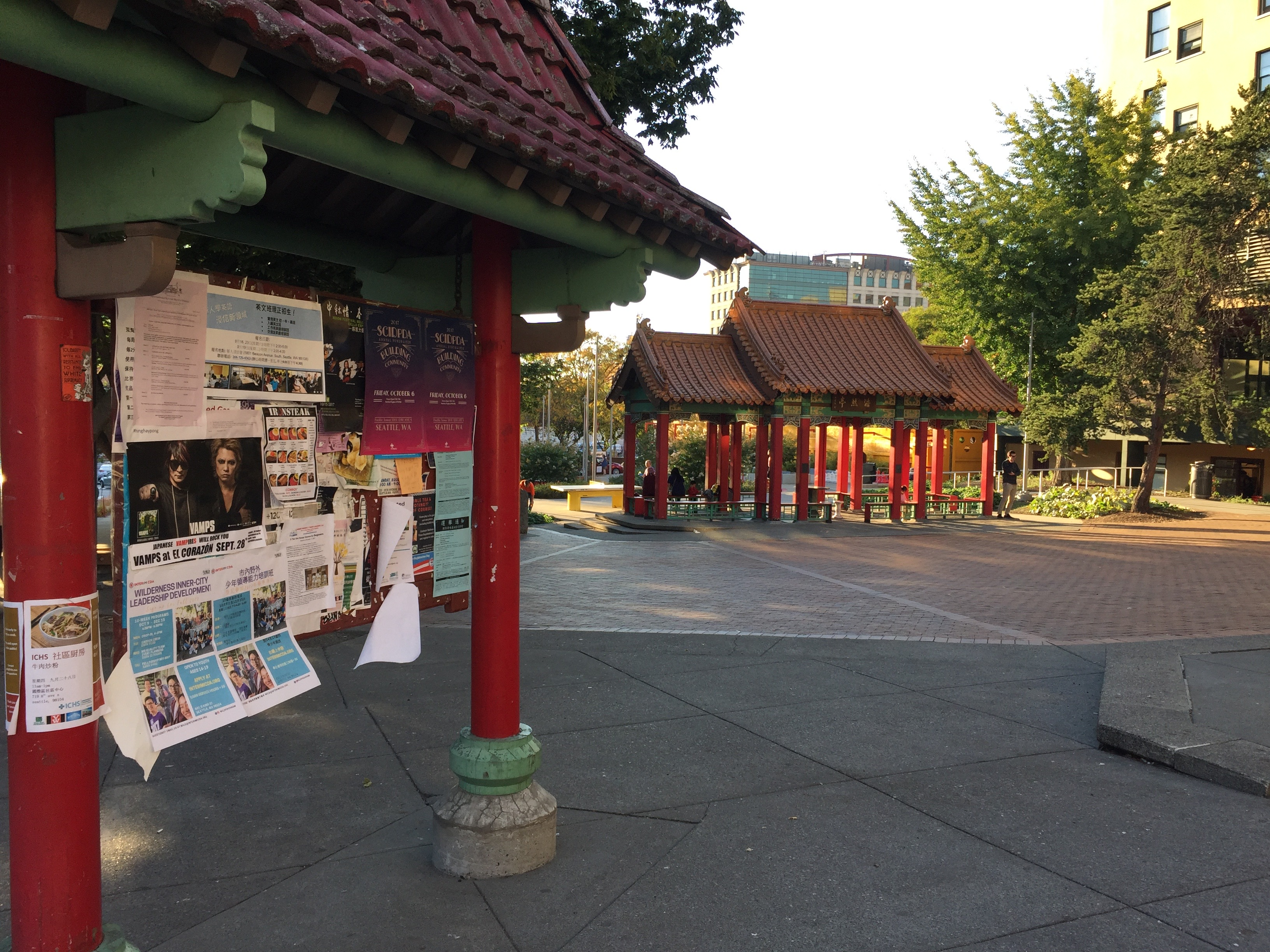
Bulletin board and pavilion (Sep 2017)

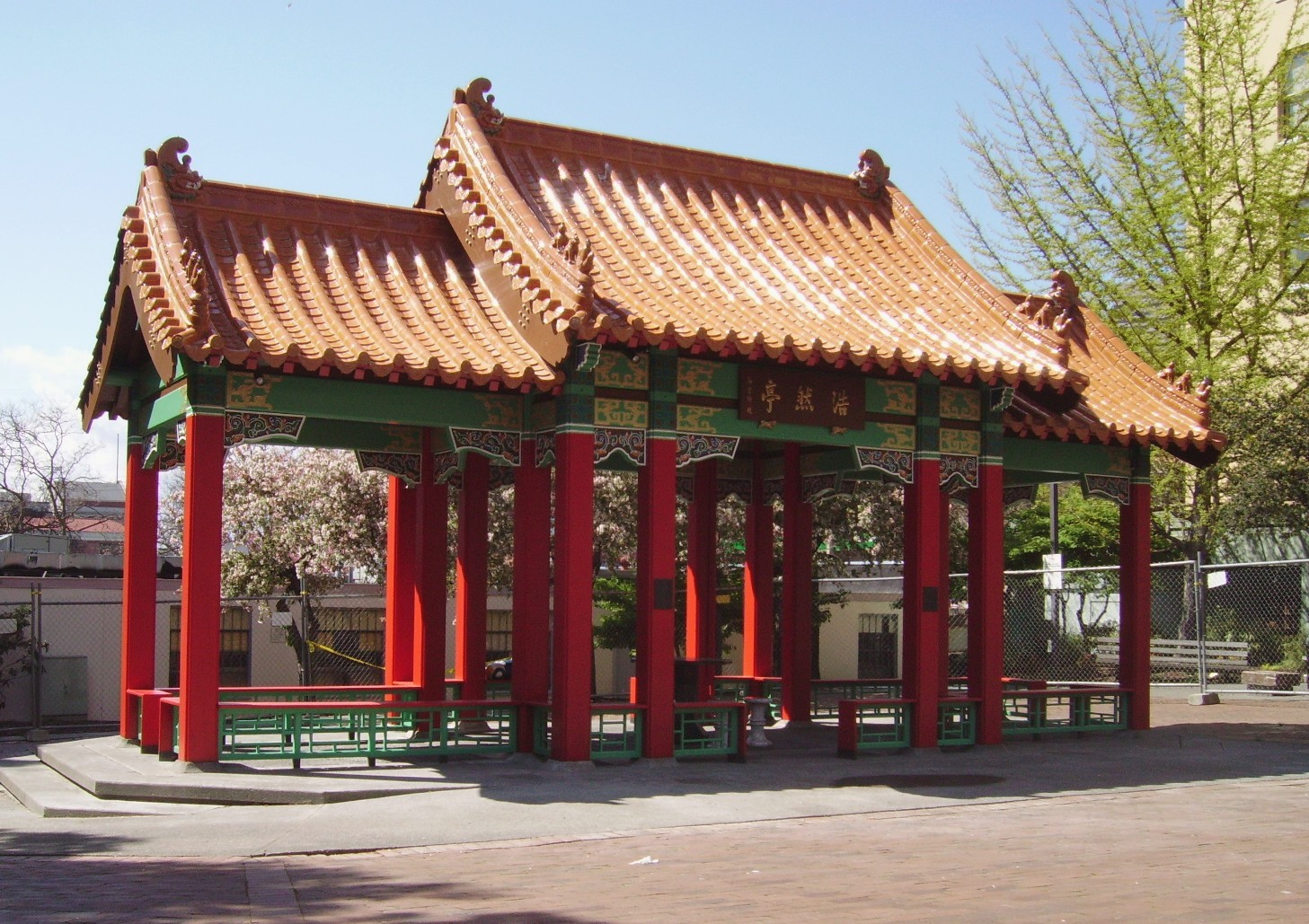
Pavilion before expansion (Jun 2015)

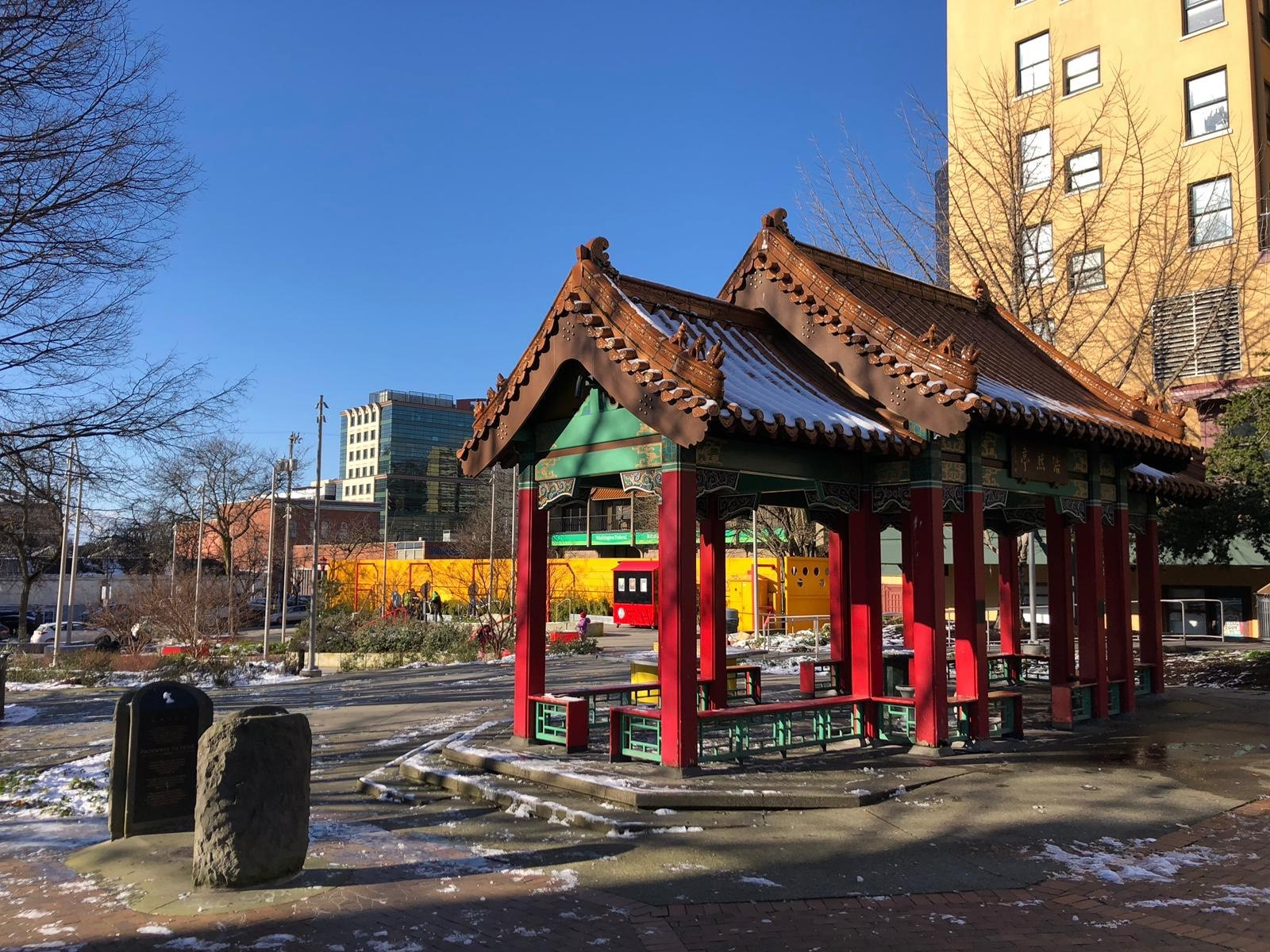
Pavilion and western expansion (Feb 2019)

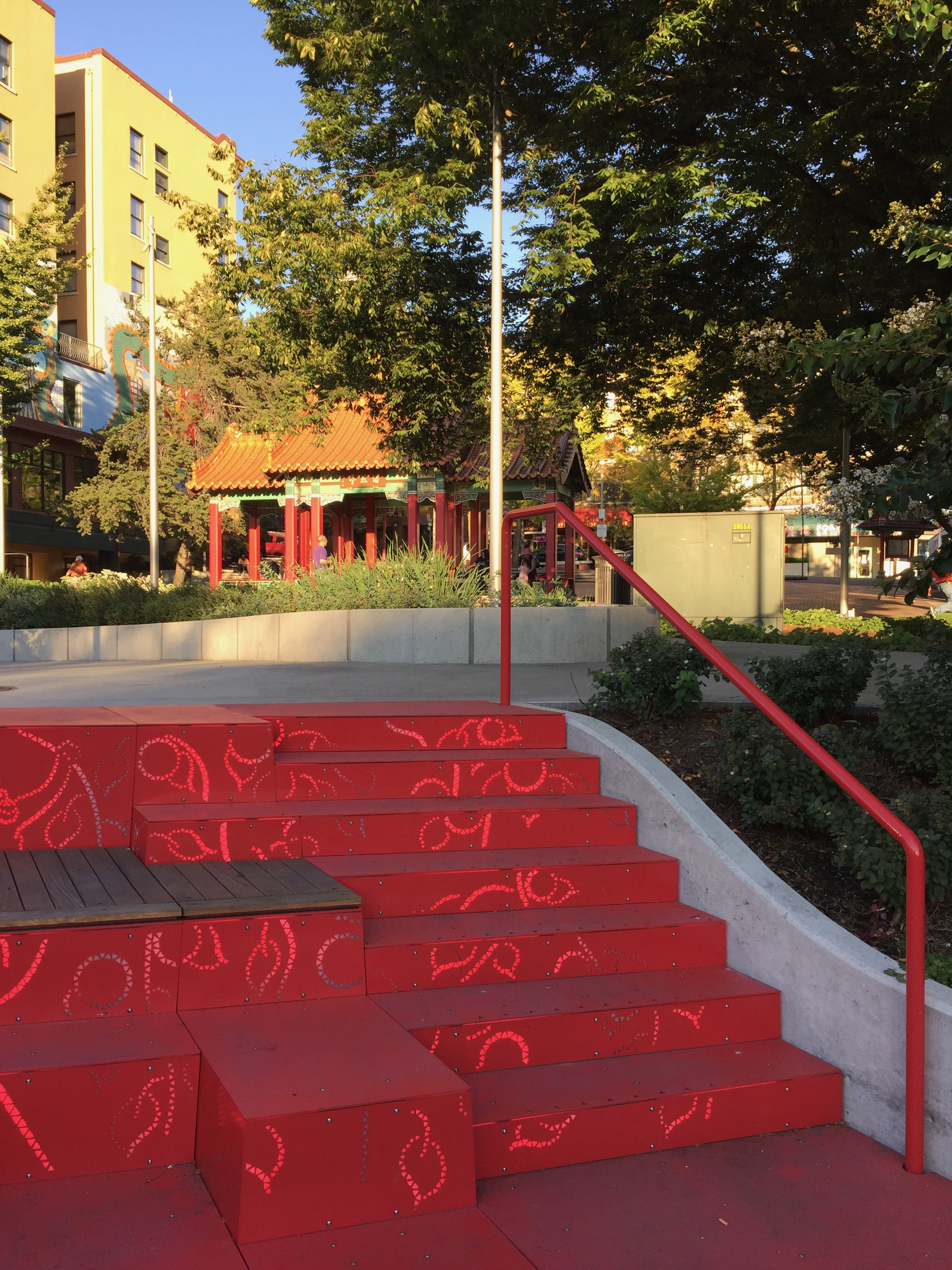
New staircase in western expansion (Sep 2017)

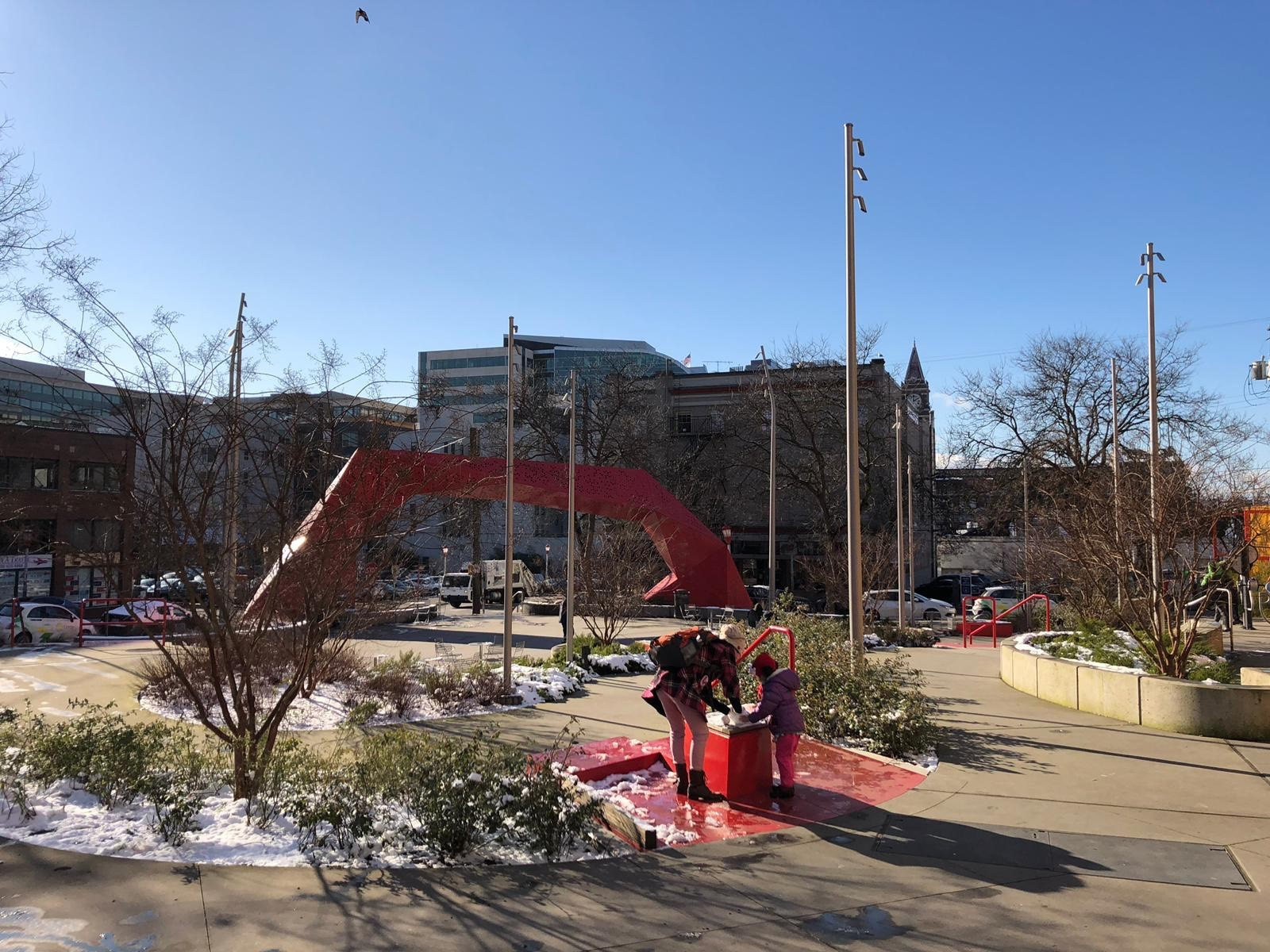
Facing southwest through new gate (Feb 2019)

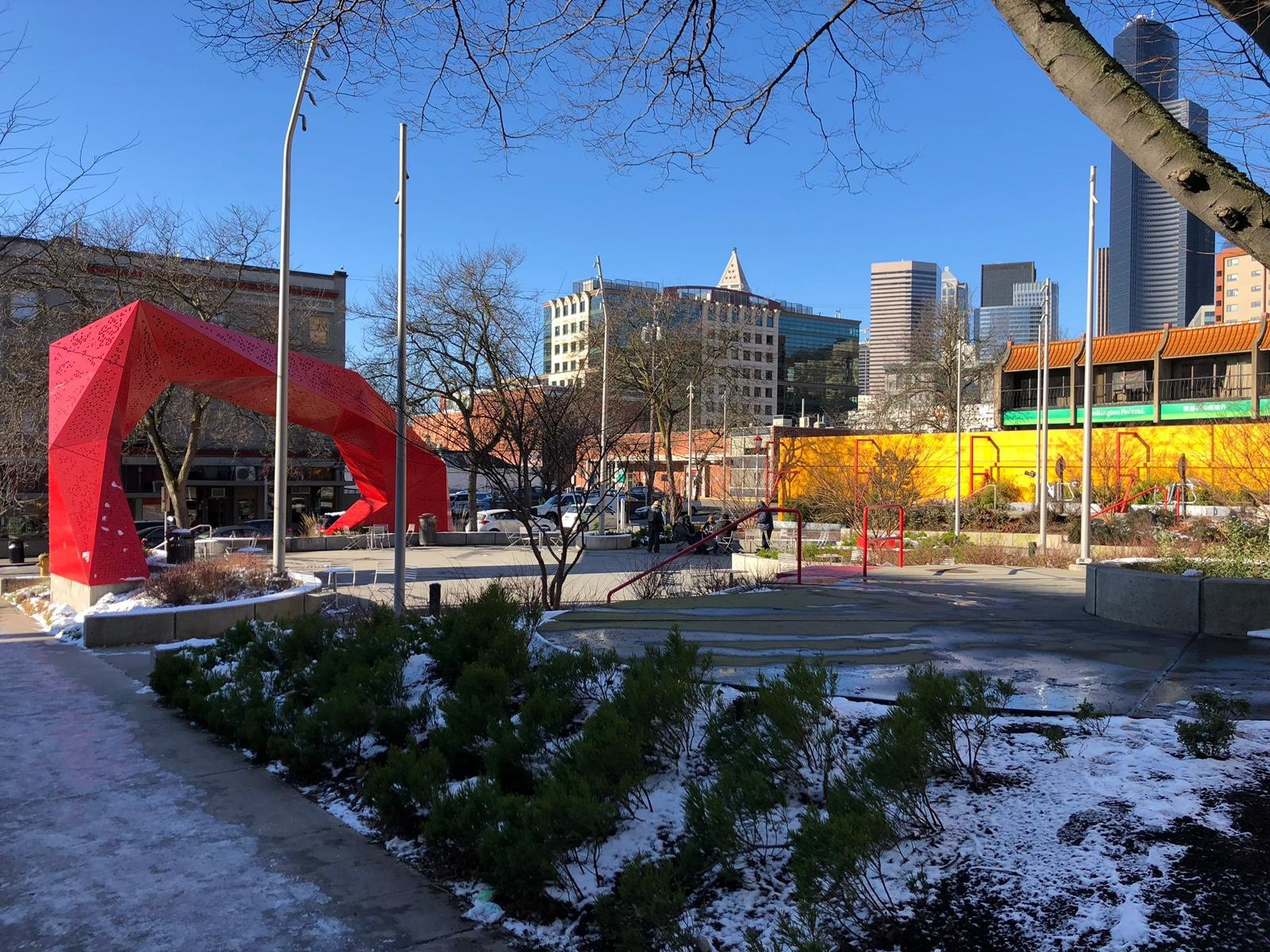
Western expansion (Feb 2019)

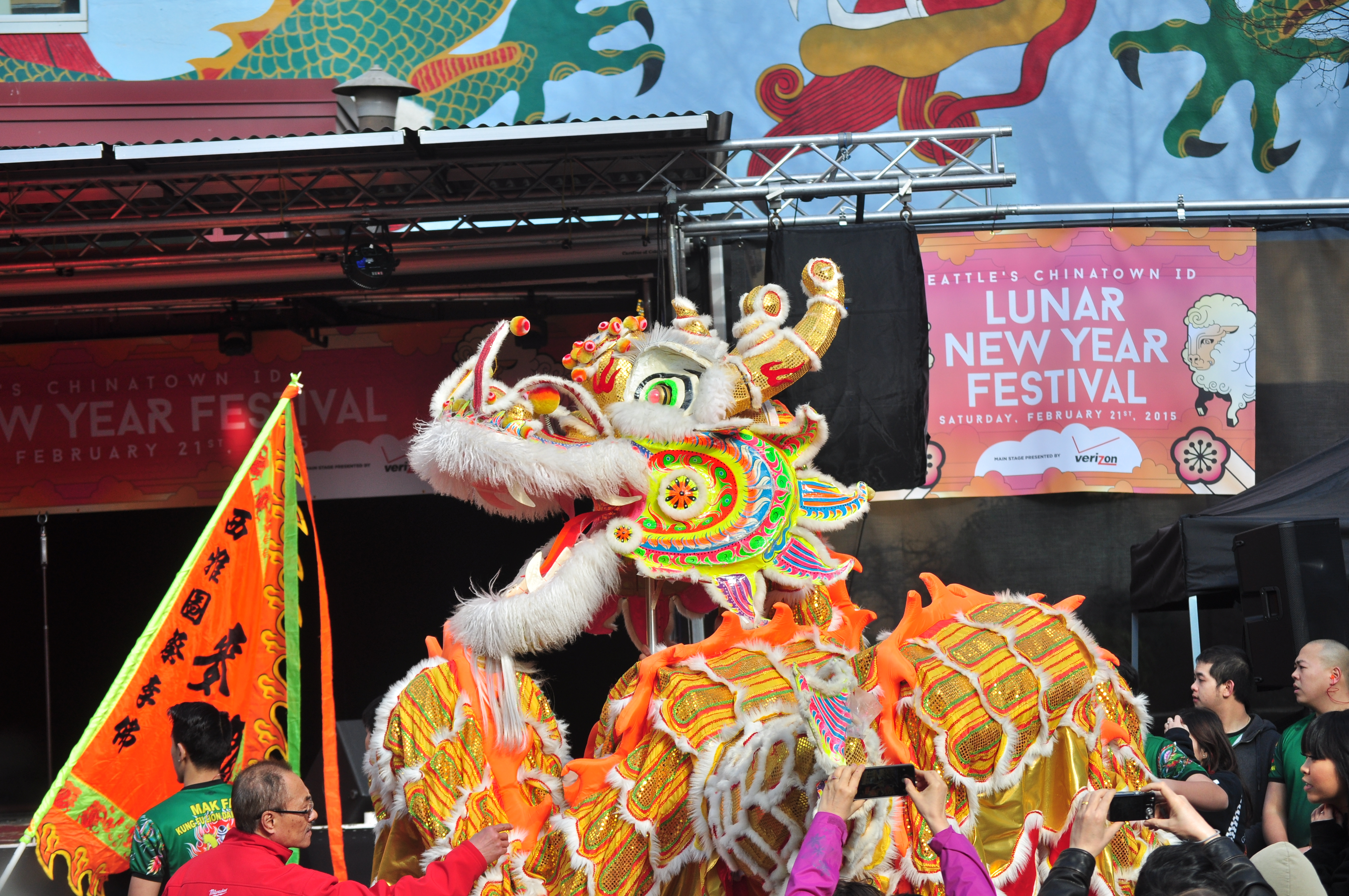
Dragon dancers (Feb 2015)

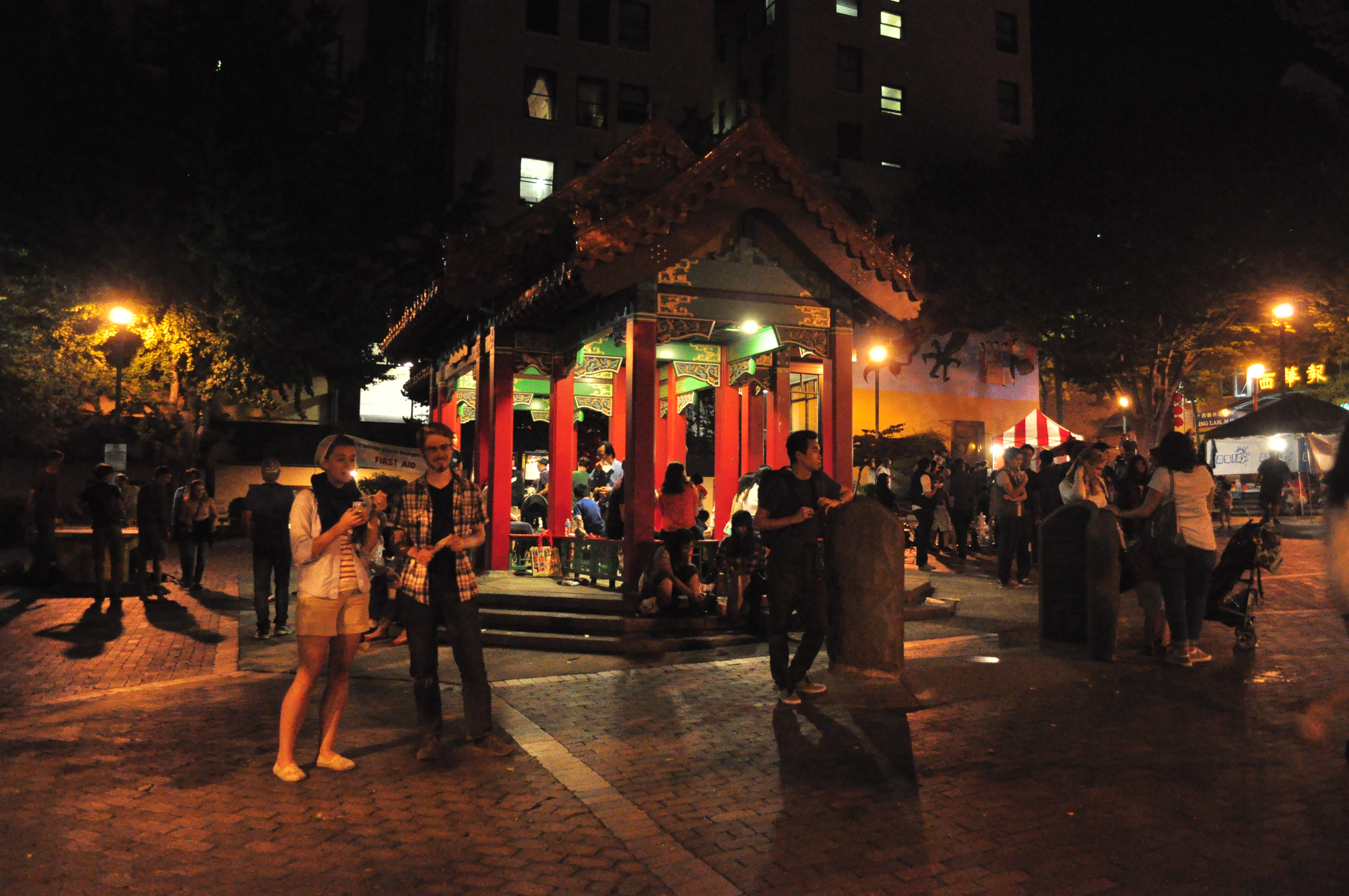
Night market (Sep 2015)
