= Cinemetropolis =

Studio album by Blue Scholars
- Released: June 14, 2011 (Nationwide)
- Genre: Alternative hip hop
- Label: Independent/Crowdfunded
- Producer: Sabzi

Blue Scholars chronology
Bayani (2007)	Cinemetropolis (2011)

Cinemetropolis is the third full-length album by Seattle alternative hip hop group Blue Scholars. The album was released on June 14, 2011, with a prerelease to fans in mid-May.

The album's title Cinémetropolis comes from a term coined by Sergei Eisenstein in his book Film Form. Geologic explained the concept of the album as a mash-up of life and cinema. He says in an interview, "We're all residents of the Cinemetropolis now. If you've ever seen a moving image and it affected you somehow whether it be a music video, the nightly news, a movie, television, sitcoms, whatever... that... all that has become a part of our truth and how we see the world." The album is planned to be released with a series of online music video short films corresponding with songs on the album. The first, "Slick Watts," premiered on May 18 and deals with the controversial relocation of the National Basketball Association (NBA)'s Seattle SuperSonics from to Seattle to Oklahoma City in July 2008.

== Release ==
With the album completed in early 2011, the group decided to forgo a traditional label release and instead went the independent route utilizing a Kickstarter campaign to fund the album's release. The original fundraising goal of $25,000 was surpassed, with a final tally of over $62,000 from over 2,200 backers. The funds are set to go toward creating music videos and short films for each of the songs from the album, in keeping with the album's cinematic motif. The group wrote the following on the album's Kickstarter page:

With your help, Cinemetropolis will be both an album and a collection of films inspired by the music. A sort of reverse movie soundtrack. With this project, each song, through collaborations with an array of filmmakers, will take on a life its own.

The album reached 40th position on the Billboard Top Heatseekers chart.

== Track listing ==
All lyrics are written by Geologic; all music is composed by Sabzi.

No.	Title	Length
1.	"Cinemetropolis"	4:06
2.	"Hussein"	3:40
3.	"Fou Lee"	3:44
4.	"Lalo Schifrin"	3:35
5.	"Seijun Suzuki" (feat. Thig Natural of The Physics)	4:33
6.	"Anna Karina"	3:17
7.	"Marion Sunshine"	3:10
8.	"Slick Watts"	3:24
9.	"George Jackson"	3:56
10.	"Oskar Barnack ∞ Oscar Grant"	4:08
11.	"Yuri Kochiyama"	3:52
12.	"Rani Mukerji"	3:16
13.	"Tommy Chong" (feat. Macklemore)	4:13
14.	"Chief Sealth"	4:42
15.	"Fin"	4:22
