= Micranots =

American hip hop duo

- Origin: Atlanta, Georgia
- Genres: Hip hop
- Years active: 1991–present
- Label: Rhymesayers Entertainment
- Members: I Self Devine; DJ Kool Akiem
- Past members: Truth Maze
- Website: www.rhymesayers.com/micranots

Micranots is an American hip hop duo, consisting of I Self Devine and DJ Kool Akiem from Atlanta, Georgia, but currently reside in Minneapolis, Minnesota. In 2013, the group was described by City Pages as "the pioneering rap group that left an immense footprint on the local hip-hop scene".

== Early beginnings ==
The original roster of Micranots included I Self Devine, DJ Kool Akiem, and Truth Maze, another emcee. The group originally formed in 1991 in Minneapolis, Minnesota and the group moved to Atlanta, Georgia in 1994 after Truth Maze left the group. Following the release of their second album, Obelisk Movements, they returned to Minnesota. The group soon became well known, in effect helping popularize Twin Cities hip hop and Midwest hip hop as a whole.

== Musical career ==
In 1996, Micranots released the debut album, Return of the Travellahs, which was later re-released on Rhymesayers Entertainment in 2003.

After a chance encounter with Big Jus while he was just departing from Company Flow, he decided to release Micranots' second album, Obelisk Movements, on Sub Verse Music. While reviewing the album, Thomas Quinlan of Exclaim! said "I Self Devine has everything it takes to be a highly-respected MC: a voice with presence and charisma, plenty of attention paid to the intricacies of writing and a message that not only needs to be verbalised but is expressed with sincerity as well."

Following the folding of Sub Verse Music, Rhymesayers Entertainment, whose members Slug and Siddiq (then known as Stress) knew Micranots through the local Minnesota circuit, and signed the group to release their third album, The Emperor & the Assassin. The album has guest appearances from Slug of Atmosphere and Muja Messiah.

== Discography ==
=== Studio albums ===
- Return of the Travellahs (1996)
- Obelisk Movements (2000)
- The Emperor & the Assassin (2004)

=== Compilation albums ===
- The Final Blend Tape (2007)

=== EPs ===
- Farward EP (1999)

=== Singles ===
- "So Deep I Never Fell" (1995)
- "All Live" (1999)
- "Culture" b/w "Illegal Business" (2000)
- "Pitch Black Ark" b/w "Exodus" (2000)
- "Glorious" b/w "Heat" (2003)
