= Bayani (album) =

Studio album by Blue Scholars
- Released: June 12, 2007 (Nationwide)
- Recorded: The New Effenneffe; Seattle, WA (2007)
- Genre: Alternative hip hop
- Length: 59:43
- Label: Mass Line Media, Rawkus Records, Duck Down Records (Redux)
- Producer: Sabzi

Blue Scholars chronology
The Long March EP (2005)	Bayani (2007)	Joe Metro EP (2007)

Alternate album covers
- Bayani Redux Cover

Professional ratings
Review scores
Source	Rating
Art of Rhyme	4/5 stars
HipHopDX.com	3.5/5 stars
Music For America	favorable
Okayplayer	4/5 stars
Pitchfork Media	(6.8/10)
JIVE Magazine	5/5 stars
Tiny Mix Tapes	3.5/5 stars

Bayani is the second full-length album by alternative hip hop group Blue Scholars. The album was released on the group's own label, Mass Line Media, and Rawkus Records on June 12, 2007, nationwide and has been available for purchase at their shows since May 11.

The album's title is a Tagalog and Persian word meaning "heroes of the people" and "the Word" respectively. Those specific languages were chosen because the Blue Scholars' two members, Geologic and Sabzi, are Filipino and Persian respectively.

The album is thematically similar to the duo's previous works, with some songs focused on socio-political issues and others showing devotion for the Seattle area. The song "50K Deep" in particular brings both themes together and describes the events of the "Battle of Seattle" in November 1999. The song was the inspiration for an interview featured in Seattle paper The Stranger with Geologic and Against Me! frontwoman Laura Jane Grace, who also wrote a song about the WTO protests titled "Baby, I'm an Anarchist".

A video for the song "Back Home" was produced by Sabzi's brother Zia and released in June 2007.

The duo also released a video for "Joe Metro" in November 2007. It features Geo riding Metro's route 48 around Seattle and walking the city streets. A video blog was posted to YouTube documenting the filming of the video.

Since the original 25,000 copies released through Massline/Rawkus in 2007 are out of print, Blue Scholars re-released this album through Duck Down Records on September 1, 2009. The re-release is called Bayani Redux and includes three bonus songs not on the original release: two from digital EPs and one new song.

== Track listing ==
All lyrics are written by Geologic; all music is composed by Sabzi.

No.	Title	Length
1.	"Baháʼí Healing Prayer"	1:10
2.	"Second Chapter"	1:54
3.	"Opening Salvo"	3:14
4.	"North by Northwest"	4:28
5.	"Ordinary Guys"	4:01
6.	"Still Got Love"	6:22
7.	"Bayani"	2:18
8.	"Loyalty"	3:59
9.	"Fire for the People"	5:01
10.	"Xenophobia"	1:50
11.	"The Distance"	2:54
12.	"Back Home"	5:11
13.	"50K Deep"	5:08
14.	"Morning of America"	7:03
15.	"Joe Metro"	5:10

Bayani Redux bonus tracks
No.	Title	Length
16.	"27" (Originally appeared on Butter & Gun$ EP)	3:47
17.	"Southbound" (Originally appeared on Joe Metro EP)	2:56
18.	"The Dawn Song" (New song, ft. Shad)	3:01

== Personnel ==
- Sabzi – DJ
- Geologic – vocals

=== Additional personnel ===
- Baháʼí Healing Prayer on Track 1 chanted by "Amu" Behnam Khoshkhoo.
- Trombone on Track 6 by Ben O'Shea, additional vocals by Khingz.
- Additional vocals on Track 11 by Rahwa Habte and Semone Andu.
- Additional vocals on Track 12 provided by Jill Laxamana.
- Guitar on Track 14 by Andy Coe.
- Trombone on Track 6 and guitar on Track 14 recorded by Aaron Walker-Loud and Deva Griffin-Grimes at One Family Inc. Studios.
- Mixed by Martin Feveyear and Saba "Sabzi" Mohajerjasbi at Jupiter Studios, Seattle WA.
- Mastered by David Locke at JP Masters, Seattle WA.
