= Lyricist Lounge: West Coast =

Compilation album by Various Artists
- Released: November 5, 2002
- Genre: Hip Hop
- Label: BP Metro Records

Professional ratings
Review scores
Source	Rating
Allmusic	link

Lyricist Lounge: West Coast is the third installment of the Lyricist Lounge series, released in November 2002. This compilation was not released on Rawkus Records like the previous two Lyricist Lounge releases, and was not as successful as the past installments. Unlike the first two Lyricist Lounge albums, which focused mainly on New York City artists, the third album features a line-up of underground West Coast artists, including Zion I, Pep Love, Chino XL, Saafir, Motion Man, Kutmasta Kurt, A-Plus, Mystik Journeymen, Luckyiam, The Grouch, King Tee, Tray Deee, Knoc-turn'al and Rasco.

== Track listing ==
1. "Let's Make Moves" featuring Furious
2. "Warrior's Dance" featuring Zion I & Pep Love
3. "How It Goes" featuring Chino XL & Saafir
4. "Super Educated, Pt. 2" featuring Arcee & Encore
5. "Let's Rally" featuring The Grouch
6. "Ventilation" featuring Groundbasics
7. "Megalo Maniac" featuring Motion Man & Kutmasta Kurt
8. "The Buzz" featuring Ammbush, A-Plus & Zion I
9. "Blackfoot Allstars" featuring Blackfoot
10. "Plastic Men" featuring Felonious
11. "Lucky's Back!" Luckyiam
12. "Nuthin Has Changed" featuring King Tee, Kool G Rap & Tray Deee
13. "Act Like You Know Me" featuring Shade Sheist, Fabolous & Knoc-turn'al
14. "Ready 2 Rock w/ Us" featuring Rasco & Kutmasta Kurt
15. "It's Time" featuring D-Tension & Encore
16. "Don't Stop" featuring The CUF
17. "The Biz" featuring Mr. Fab
