= Youth Speaks =

- Formation: 1996
- Founded at: San Francisco, California
- Purpose: Literacy, activism
- Location: United States
- Fields: Poetry slams
- Website: youthspeaks.org

Youth Speaks is an American nonprofit organization that focuses on promoting teen literacy and civic engagement through the writing and performance of spoken word slam poetry. It annually hosts Brave New Voices, an international poetry slam championship.

== Critical reception ==
SFGate wrote in response to a 2016 San Francisco Youth Speaks poetry slam event "In their poems, the teens speak passionately about identity, justice, sexuality, drugs. They aim sharp metaphors at questionable authorities."

== Youth Speaks Hawaii ==
Youth Speaks Hawaii (YSH) is a program of Hawai'i nonprofit Pacific Tongues, an offshoot of Youth Speaks. Founded in January 2005, YSH runs weekly workshops with mentors from throughout the Hawaii poetry slam community, and special guest mentors, which are open for all interested students to write, read, and discuss poetry and performance.

Since its creation Youth Speaks Hawaii has participated in the Brave New Voices competition by sending a team of up to six poets to each event. In the 2007 Brave New Voices championship, held in San Jose, California, YSH placed 7th among the 35 teams. Preceding the 2008 event, held in Washington, D.C., YSH was chosen as one of the teams featured in HBO's series "Russell Simmons Presents: Brave New Voices." Hawaii finished first in that year's event, the eleventh and largest to date. The following year at the event held in Chicago, Illinois, with a total of 50 teams competing, Hawaii repeated as champions.

== See also ==
- Poetry Slam, Inc.
