= Blue Scholars =

American hip hop duo based in Seattle, Washington

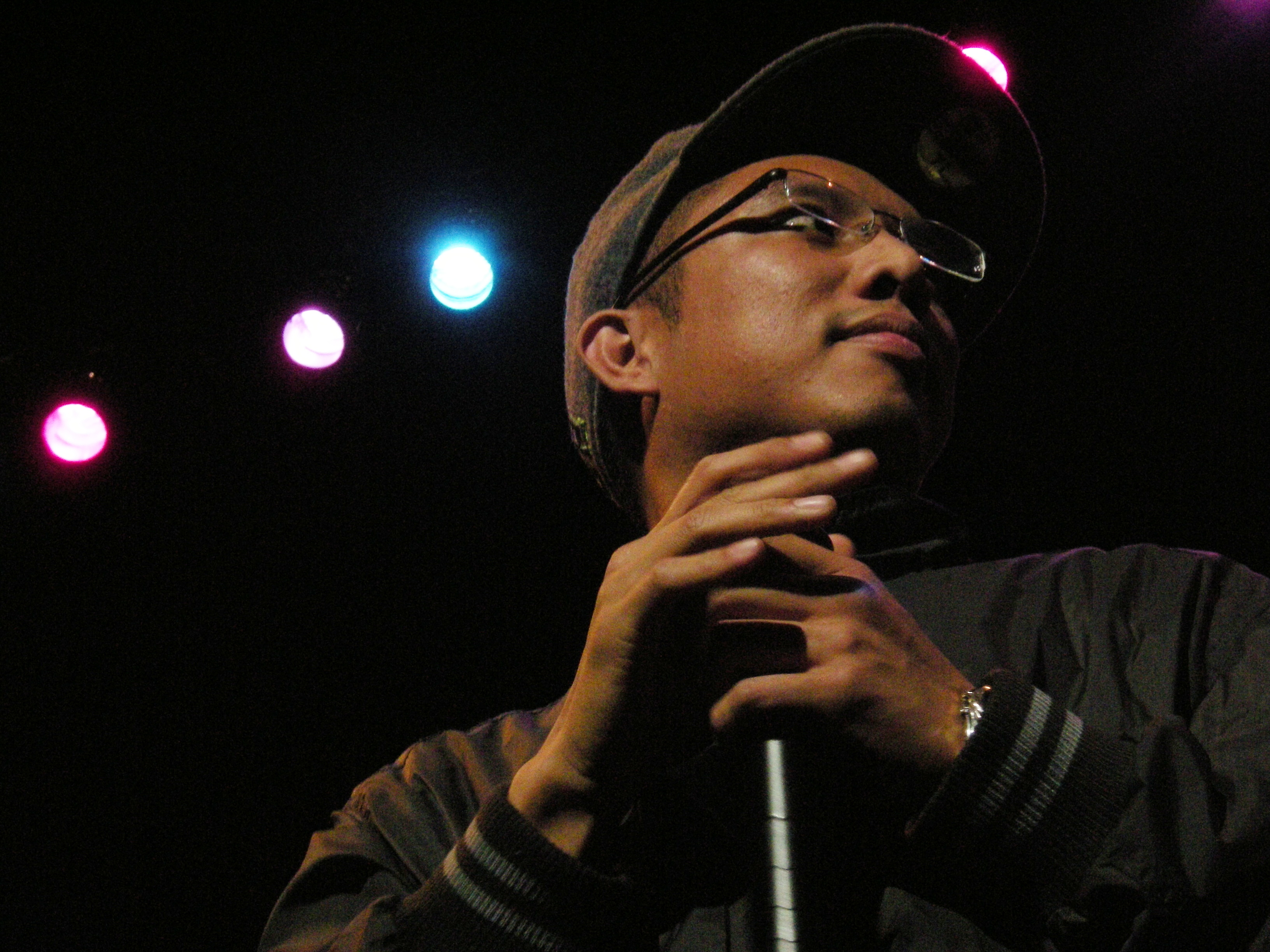
- MC Geologic of Blue Scholars

Background information
- Origin: Seattle, Washington, U.S.
- Genres: Hip hop, alternative hip hop, northwest hip hop
- Years active: 2002–2025
- Labels: Massline Media, Rawkus, Duck Down
- Members: Geologic (George Quibuyen); Sabzi (Saba Mohajerjasbi)

Blue Scholars was an American hip hop duo based in Seattle, Washington. It was formed in 2002 while the members, DJ Sabzi (Saba Mohajerjasbi) and MC Geologic (George Quibuyen), were students at the University of Washington.

The name "Blue Scholars" is a play on the term "blue collar", an idiom for workers who often earn hourly wages for manual labor. Their music and lyrics frequently focus on struggles between socioeconomic classes, challenging authority, and youth empowerment. These themes are often specifically addressed in relation to the Seattle region ("Southside Revival", "North by Northwest", "50 Thousand Deep", "Joe Metro", "Slick Watts" and "The Ave") and heavily draw upon Geologic's history as an activist within the Filipino American community dealing with issues of immigration, racism, and U.S. imperialism in the Philippines. Recent music has begun to extend even further outward, reflecting the group's greater West Coast and Pacific roots including an album devoted to exploring Geo's Hawaiian heritage on the OOF! EP.

== History ==
The hip hop group first came to be in 2002 because "two students skipped a class, went and crafted an album", as mentioned in the 2007 track "Bayani". The two students, George Quibuyen and Alexei Saba Mohajerjasbi, were attending the University of Washington at the time. The two met at a meeting for S.H.O.W. (the Student HipHop Organization of Washington), which was organized by classmate and future manager Marc Matsui. The organization had set out to revive an authentic interest in hip hop within Seattle, which, at the time, had become a solely rock town. This was a result of a series of incidents, including a shooting at an Ice Cube concert in the early 1990s, as well as the Teen Dance Ordinance. George and Alexei soon joined forces and formed their own duo that utilized Geo's raps and Sabzi's beats and became known as the Blue Scholars.

Since then the duo has performed in over 400 shows together across the United States, including the Sasquatch! Music Festival in 2005, 2006, and 2008, and Bumbershoot opening for Kanye West in 2006. They have opened for and shared stages with such artists as De La Soul, Slick Rick, Wordsworth, Kanye West, Hieroglyphics, Immortal Technique, The Coup and Masta Ace. In 2006, the Blue Scholars received top honors in the hip hop category of the Seattle Weekly's Music Awards Poll and were also the top-vote-getters overall; in earlier years, they had been recognized in the categories of Best Hip-hop Artist, Best Local Single, and Best Album.

Over the years the duo has continued to use their music as a tool for social change and DIY activism. Since those formative years in S.H.O.W. at the University of Washington, Geo has continued to promote youth empowerment and support for political groups that include, but are not limited to, BAYAN-USA, isangmahal arts kollective, and Youth Speaks Hawaii. In 2007, Geologic, representing Blue Scholars, went on tour with hip hop artist Kiwi, to promote the Stop the Killings Tour to bring awareness to the deaths of regular people in the Philippines. Also in 2007, the group was ranked best hip-hop artist of the Pacific Northwest by NPR.

== Members ==
=== Geologic ===
Geologic (born George Quibuyen; also known as Prometheus Brown, Geo) is the vocalist for the Blue Scholars and has also performed as a spoken word poet. In the 2007–2008 citywide election for Seattle's Poet Populist, Quibuyen placed sixth with ninety-six write-in votes, the highest total for a write-in candidate in the nine-year history of the competition; although, the record was subsequently broken by Seattle poet Ananda Osel in the 2008–2009 election.

The son of Filipino immigrants, Quibuyen lived in various locations along the west coast and Hawaii as a child until his family settled in Bremerton, Washington. Geo feels rooted in his Filipino heritage and that there is an unfinished revolution among his people. His lyrics are drawn from experience, crafted for a connection to community, and working to uplift communities in general. He remains a strong advocate for the Filipino community all over the world, as an outspoken critic of US foreign policy, including its tough immigration laws and unfair corporate practices by Western business.

In 2011, Prometheus Brown released the album Prometheus Brown and Bambu Walk into a Bar with Los Angeles rapper Bambu. In 2014, they released a second album, titled Barkada.

Geo's side project includes Hood Famous in Seattle.

=== Sabzi ===
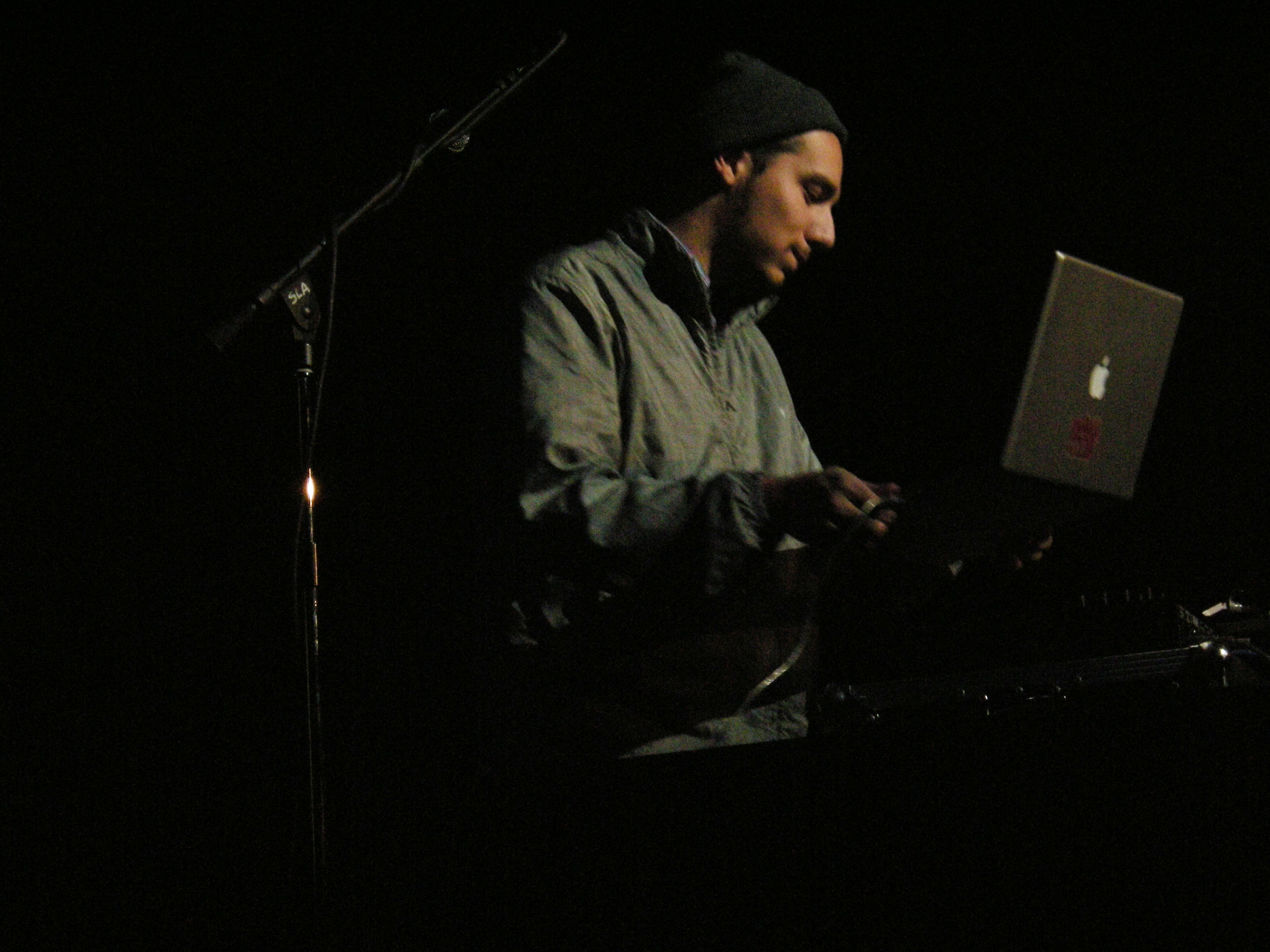
Sabzi of Blue Scholars

Sabzi (born Alexei Saba Mohajerjasbi; also known as Saba) is of Iranian American heritage and is a jazz-trained pianist. He holds a background in punk and ska before he turned to beats and turntables with the Blue Scholars. A Seattle area native himself, Sabzi is rooted in his own Iranian culture and practices the Baháʼí faith, which is grounded in diversity, economic conservation, and other social justice practices. Blue Scholars' album Bayani contains a Baháʼí prayer chanted by Behnam Khoshkhoo as the first track. Similar to Geo, Sabzi believes in organizing communities together in order to create change. He is inspired by the youth that he works with in high school and college workshops, as well as the community, and finds their thoughts and opinions on music and society today to be one of the most influential factors in his music.

== Record label ==
Opting to create their own record label rather than sign with an existing company, Blue Scholars members Geologic and Sabzi, along with MCs RA Scion of Common Market and Gabriel Teodros, launched MassLine Media in 2006. The label's mission statement includes the goal of using hip hop as a means of grassroots community organizing and youth outreach. MassLine entered a joint venture with hip hop label Rawkus Records in 2007 for the June 12, 2007 release of their new album Bayani; the name derives its meaning from two different languages. In Tagalog it literally means "heroes of the people" and in Persian "Bayan" means "the Word". The June 12 release also commemorated the anniversary of the Philippine Declaration of Independence from Spain in 1898. In July, 2009, Blue Scholars worked out a distribution relationship with Seattle coffee chain Cafe Vita and a record deal with Duck Down Records in which the label signed to the band.

On March 6, 2011, the Blue Scholars made a further move away from the traditional music label structure, beginning a campaign of "signing to the people" where fans, supporters, and listeners will be the primary financial capital for their new record, Cinemetropolis. The project had already been more than 150% funded by over 1400 backers via Kickstarter just ten days after beginning. On April 22, the Kickstarter campaign ended, making the Blue Scholars the first hip-hop artists to "Sign to the People". In total, the campaign raised $62,391 with the help of 2243 backers each pitching in an average of roughly $28.

== Future ==
The Blue Scholars plan on continuing to make music that empowers the youth and communities of Seattle, the West Coast, the United States, and eventually the world. They continue to experiment with different multi-media elements in their music and transcend what is considered "traditional" in the hip hop world.

Front man Geo hopes to appeal to a culturally diverse audience. As the son of Filipino immigrants, he says he hopes to see more Filipino and Asian fans as well as more people of color in general at their shows.

On April 3, 2026, MC Geo shared an Instagram post stating that he and Sabzi are no longer aligned. “I will always honor what Blue Scholars created…but as for me and bro working together, that chapter has closed”.

== Popular culture ==
In Valve's games Half-Life 2 and in Half-Life 2: Episode Two, the Blue Scholars' name can be seen on the front of several radio boxes throughout the game along with the radio station "FM 89.50". It is also on an audio receiver in Kleiner's lab, above the camera screens. This is because Sabzi is the cousin of Dhabih Eng, an artist for Valve. 89.5 FM is a reference to the frequency of Seattle, WA, radio station KNHC-FM. It is one of the few radio stations in the country that is run entirely by high-school students, in this case the students of Nathan Hale High School.

The song "Sagaba Remix" is featured in the Xbox 360 video game Project Gotham Racing 4.

Starting in 2019, the song "Slick Watts" is played in CenturyLink Field before kickoff of Seattle Sounders FC home matches.

== Discography ==
=== Albums ===
- Blue Scholars (Pacific Northwest release: Independent, February 28, 2004; National release: Independent, June 21, 2005)
- Bayani (Massline/Rawkus, June 12, 2007; Redux: Massline/Duck Down, September 1, 2009)
- Cinemetropolis (Independent/Kickstarter, June 14, 2011)

=== EPs ===
- The Long March EP (Independent, December 6, 2005)
- Joe Metro EP (Massline/Rawkus, November 6, 2007)
- Butter & Gun$ EP (Massline/Rawkus, April 29, 2008)
- OOF! EP (Massline/Duck Down, August 25, 2009)

=== Singles ===
- "Freewheelin" (Independent, Aug 2005)

=== Non-album tracks ===
- Invocation (late 2003; web release, cut from Blue Scholars LP)
- Morning Tea (late 2003; web release, cut from Blue Scholars LP)
- Wide Asleep (late 2003; web release, cut from Blue Scholars LP)
- Inkwell (Crashed-Cop-Car Remix) (2004; web release, samples Modest Mouse's song Float On)
- Bluchini (Sept 2007; web release, demo)
- Coffee & Snow (Dec 2008; web video release)
- Michelle Malkin (Feb 2010; web release)
- Paul Valery (Mar 2010; web release, samples Owl City's song "Fireflies")
- New People (Empire Way Remix) (Apr 2010; web release)
- Summertime In The SEA (Jul 2010; web release)
- Lumiere (Sep 2010; web release)
- Big Bank Hank (Oct 2010; web release, samples Bibio's song Lovers' Carvings)
- Coffee & Snow 2 (Nov 2010; web video release)
- John DeLorean (Apr 2011; web release)
- Fly Me (Sept 2011; released on Prometheus Brown's "Brownouts, Vol. 1")
- bell hooks (Sept 2011; released on Prometheus Brown's "Brownouts, Vol. 1")
- May Day (Jun 2012; web release)
- The Sound (feat. Sound Transit) (Oct 2012; web release)
- The Decisive Moment (Nov 2012; unmastered web release)

=== The Bar (Prometheus Brown and Bambu) ===
- Prometheus Brown and Bambu Walk Into A Bar (Beatrock/In4mation, July 6, 2011)
- Barkada (Beatrock, March 11, 2014)
- Son of Barkada (Beatrock, July 21, 2015)

== Videography ==
- 2004: "Freewheelin"
- 2007: "Back Home"
- 2007: "Joe Metro"
- 2008: "Loyalty"
- 2008: "Coffee and Snow"
- 2009: "HI-808"
- 2010: "Coffee and Snow 2"
- 2011: "Fou Lee"
- 2012: "Seijun Suzuki"
- 2012: "Slick Watts"
- 2012: "Anna Karina"

=== with The Bar ===
- 2012: "Lookin' Up"
- 2012: "At It Again"
- 2014: "Coming (To America)"
- 2014: "The Bar"
- 2014: "Mits"

=== Sabzi ===
See Sabzi for complete listing

== See also ==
- Filipino hip hop
- "Hip-Hop and Critical Revolutionary Pedagogy: Blue Scholarship to Challenge 'The Miseducation of the Filipino'" by Michael Viola
- The Ave
