= Eyez on the Prize =

Eyez on the Prize is a hip hop compilation album released April 13, 1999 by the Trump Tight record label.

The record was planned as a soundtrack to an independent film of the same name which Rodney Hisatake intended to co-produce. The film was to follow the struggles of four fictional brothers migrating from American Samoa to California, shedding light on the hardships of two of the brothers as they become entangled with the world of illicit drugs. The film was never completed due to insufficient funding.

== Track listing ==
=== Disc 1 ===
1. Dog Eat Dog World (Intro)
2. Have 'Em Hatin' - Mac Dre/Young Nade (prod. by Jake One)
3. Eyez On The Prize - Lord Tariq & Peter Gunz/Kutfather
4. You And Your 9MM - Down-N-Dirty Click (Dirty South)
5. Night Shift - Richie Rich/Samoends
6. Game Trump Tight - Snoop Dogg/JT The Bigga Figga/Kutfather (prod. by Jake One and Vitamin D)
7. Interlude - Slim The Pale Pimp/Skrilla Mob
8. Follow Me - Black Rhino/Skrilla Mobb/Flash
9. All Day - Savage Gentleman
10. All My Niggaz - Luniz/2wice/Phats Bossi
11. Sexy Lil' Neighbor - Dre Dog A.K.A. Andre Nickatina
12. My Blocks - L.C./Down-N-Dirty Hustlers
13. Gotta Get My Paper Right (Out Of 10 Niggaz Ain't Real!) - Da' Unda' Dogg/Usual Suspects/Baby Beesh (Latino Velvet)
14. an't Go Against The Grain (Outro)"

=== Disc 2 ===
1. Dead End (Spoken Word) - IPO
2. Paper Riderz - Samoenoz Ent.
3. Obey Yo' P.O. - E-40/2wice/Quran
4. Lace 'Em Up - Big Mack/Maine-O/Family Tyz
5. Pimps & Playas - San Quinn/G-Boogie/Daveroski
6. It Takes Dirt To Make Flowers Grow
7. It's The Mob - Dubee A.K.A. Sugawolf/M.O.H.
8. You Can't Loose - B-Boy Posse/Kilomai/J-Mack
9. Dreams Of Being Rich - Big Rob
10. Slippin' - Rushe
11. Eastside 'G' Riderz - Brown-N-Proud/Baby Beesh (Latino Velvet)
12. Ain't Nothin' Changed - Calico/Young Al/Pistal (Usual Suspects)
13. My Destiny - Usual Suspects
14. Intro To The Fugitive"
15. The Fugitive - Cougnut/Guce/U.D.I.
16. Outro
