= Self Destruction (album) =

Studio album by I Self Devine
- Released: August 2, 2005
- Genre: Hip hop
- Length: 56:04
- Label: Rhymesayers Entertainment
- Producers: Ant, Vitamin D, Jake One, Bean One

I Self Devine chronology
Self Destruction (2005)	The Sounds of Low Class Amerika (2012)

Professional ratings
Review scores
Source	Rating
AllMusic	4/5 stars
PopMatters	Favorable

Self Destruction is the first studio album by American hip hop artist I Self Devine. It was released August 2, 2005 on Rhymesayers Entertainment. It was named one of the most underrated Rhymesayers Entertainment releases by Star Tribune in 2013.

== Music ==
The album is produced by Ant of Atmosphere, Vitamin D, Jake One, and Bean One. Guest appearances include Budah Tye, Matza I and Blacc Money.

== Track listing ==
No.	Title	Producer	Length
1.	"I Am"	Vitamin D	0:38
2.	"This Is It"	Jake One	2:25
3.	"Getcha Money On"	Ant	3:05
4.	"Live In the Moment" (featuring Budah Tye)	Vitamin D	3:17
5.	"All I Know" (featuring Metza)	Ant	3:55
6.	"Sex Sex Sex" (featuring Matza I)	Ant	2:57
7.	"Feel My Pain"	Ant	3:06
8.	"I Can't Say Nothing Wrong"	Ant	3:40
9.	"Love Song"	Bean One	4:30
10.	"Ice Cold"	Jake One	3:01
11.	"Everyday Shit"	Jake One	3:28
12.	"Actions" (featuring Blacc Money)	Vitamin D	4:30
13.	"All We Need Is Another Day"	Bean One	3:45
14.	"Overthrow"	Ant	4:14
15.	"Sunshine"	Ant	9:33
