= I Self Devine =

American rapper (born 1972)

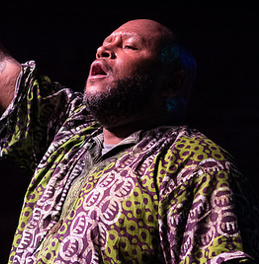
- I Self Devine performing in 2010

Background information
- Also known as: Self One
- Born: Chaka Mkali; 1972 (age 53–54); Los Angeles, California, U.S.
- Origin: Minneapolis, Minnesota, U.S.
- Genres: Twin Cities hip-hop
- Occupations: Rapper; record producer; activist
- Years active: 1995–present
- Label: Rhymesayers Entertainment

Chaka Mkali (born 1972), better known by his stage name I Self Devine, is an American rapper from Minneapolis, Minnesota. He has been a member of groups such as the Dynospectrum, Micranots, and Semi.Official. In 2012, City Pages described him as "one of the most influential voices in Minnesota hip hop".

== Early life ==
I Self Devine was born in Los Angeles, California, and moved to Minnesota with his mother when she was accepted to the University of Minnesota's social work master's program. He said: "The first time that I became aware of hip-hop was in 1979, when my mom gave me [The Sugarhill Gang's] 'Rapper's Delight,' the 12-inch." He experimented with graffiti writing, freestyling, DJing, and breakdancing before starting to invest lots of time into rapping and graffiti.

== Career ==
I Self Devine released the solo debut album, Self Destruction, on Rhymesayers Entertainment in 2005. He released the second solo album, The Sound of Low Class Amerika, on the label in 2012. It was produced by Medium Zach of Big Quarters, DJ Todda, Benzilla, King Karnov, Vitamin D, Jake One, Proh Mic, and I Self Devine himself. The album was preceded by four mixtapes, which were all released in early 2012. In 2015, he released a collaborative album with Muja Messiah, titled 9th House. In an interview with The Current radio station, he stated that he was expecting to release two albums in 2021: Rituals of Resilience and That Which Is Hidden.

I Self Devine is celebrated for his live shows. Spectrum Culture wrote that he "is synonymous with a dynamic live show."

== Personal life ==
I Self Devine has five children. He told The Current, "To think about emceeing or even being a community organizer – those are great things and have big impacts. But to me, when all of my kids are together, I feel rich beyond belief. I feel crazy wealthy, like I got gold as far as you can see."

== Discography ==
=== Studio albums ===
- Self Destruction (2005)
- The Sound of Low Class Amerika (2012)
- Rituals of Resilience (2021)
- That Which Is Hidden (2022)

=== Collaborative albums ===
- 9th House (2015) (with Muja Messiah)

=== Mixtapes ===
- LA State of Mind (2012)
- The Upliftment Struggle (2012)
- Reports from the Field: In the Trenches (2012)
- The Shining Path (2012)

=== Singles ===
- "Ice Cold" b/w "All I Know" (2005)
- "The Origin of Urban Crisis" (2012)
- "IOFWUCUC" (2015) (with Muja Messiah)
- "The Disruptor Suite" (2021)

=== Guest appearances ===
- Atmosphere – "Flesh" from God Loves Ugly (2002)
- The Opus – "First Contact" from First Contact 001 (2002)
- P.O.S – "I Play the Matador (Redo)" from Ipecac Neat (2004)
- Oddjobs – "Stone Cold" from Expose Negative (2005)
- Omega One – "I Want It All" from The Lo-Fi Chronicles (2005)
- Cleveland Steamers – "Day by Day" from Treasure Chest (2006)
- Leroy Smokes – "John Henry" from Love Hustle Theater (2006)
- Big Quarters – "How to Kill Your Rap Career" from Cost of Living (2007)
- Heiruspecs – "Broken Record" from Heiruspecs (2008)
- Muja Messiah – "Patriot Act" from Thee Adventures of a B-Boy D-Boy (2008)
- Doomtree – "Twentyfourseven" from Doomtree (2008)
- Crushcon7 – "Fieldwerk" (2009)
- Toki Wright – "The Law" from A Different Mirror (2009)
- St. Paul Slim – "McArthur Park" from Bald Headed Samsun (2010)
- Villa Rosa – "Chico" from Blue Diamond Island (2011)
- IBE & Benzilla – "Casual Convo" from This, That and the Third (2013)
