= The Anti-Album =

Studio album by Semi.Official
- Released: September 16, 2003
- Genre: Hip hop, alternative hip hop
- Length: 63:57
- Label: Rhymesayers Entertainment
- Producer: DJ Abilities

Professional ratings
Review scores
Source	Rating
HipHopDX	3.5/5 stars
Fifth Element	favorable

The Anti-Album is the only studio album by American hip hop duo Semi.Official, consisting of rapper I Self Devine, a member of Micranots, and DJ Abilities, a member of Eyedea & Abilities. It was released September 16, 2003 on Rhymesayers Entertainment.

== Music ==
The album was produced by DJ Abilities. Guest appearances include Buddah Tye, Mr. Gene Poole and MF Doom.

== Track listing ==
No.	Title	Length
1.	"Semi.Official?"	2:48
2.	"Grey"	2:59
3.	"Songs In The Key Of Tryfe" (featuring MF Doom)	4:47
4.	"Styfle Progression"	3:44
5.	"Transitions"	4:00
6.	"Systems Goe"	2:59
7.	"Hit The Deck" (featuring Buddah Tye)	3:33
8.	"Police Assassination Anthem"	4:04
9.	"Crime"	4:43
10.	"Stand On Ya Square"	4:10
11.	"Get Up"	2:27
12.	"Live & Direct"	1:26
13.	"Invisible Princess"	3:52
14.	"Hurt Ya Feelings"	3:34
15.	"Nocturnal Terrorist Squad"	6:52
16.	"Wishing For A Miracle" (featuring Mr. Gene Poole)	4:05
17.	"I94W"	3:54
