= ECID =

ECID may refer to:

- Ecid, American rapper
- A technical term involved in Apple security SHSH blob
- East Coast Integrated Depot, a bus and train depot in Singapore
