= The Whereabouts of Hidden Bridges =

1999 album by Eyedea and Oddjobs

EP by Eyedea and Advisor, Crescent Moon, and DJ Anatomy of Oddjobs
- Released: 1999
- Genre: Alternative hip-hop
- Label: CMI Records

Eyedea chronology
The Whereabouts of Hidden Bridges (1999)	First Born (2001)

Oddjobs chronology
Conflict & Compromise (1999)	The Whereabouts of Hidden Bridges (1999)	Absorbing Playtime (2000)

The Whereabouts of Hidden Bridges is a collaborative mixtape by Minnesota alternative hip-hop artist Eyedea and Advizer (Adam Waytz), Crescent Moon (Alexei Casselle), and DJ Anatomy (Stephen Lewis) of the rap quintet Oddjobs. It was released in 1999 by CMI Records in a small quantity, and is now considered a rare early work by both artists.

== History ==
At the time Eyedea met the members of Oddjobs in about 1997, he had established himself solidly in the Twin Cities hip-hop scene but had not yet released his debut album, First Born, and was just beginning to develop his national reputation. After getting to know them, he invited several members of the group to collaborate with him, recording the tracks for The Whereabouts of Hidden Bridges in only a week on a four-track tape. Oddjobs MC Crescent Moon had been performing backup for Eyedea during his live sets for about two years prior to the recording. Eyedea's partner DJ Abilities performs on the track "Burn Baby".

Advizer later called the recording sessions "one of the most enjoyable musical experiences I have had", also telling the website UGSMAG he was especially proud of the song "P.S.P. (Philosopher Scientist Poet)", saying, "It was a really original concept with a lot of symbolic meaning to it. That’s the one song I can always listen to and be satisfied with."

It was released on cassette in 1999.

A song from this session was later used on the 2003 Oddjobs EP The Shopkeeper's Wife.

== Track listing ==
No.	Title	Length
1.	"Hidden Bridges"	2:16
2.	"Face Forward"	3:41
3.	"Burn Baby" (Scratches: Abilities)	4:16
4.	"From this Side of the Room"	1:42
5.	"Burbs, Sticks, Bricks"	2:47
6.	"Pot of Gold"	3:33
7.	"P.S.P."	3:11
8.	"The Power of Myth"	3:36
