= The Shopkeeper's Wife =

EP by Oddjobs
- Released: April 8, 2003
- Studio: The Blue Lounge, Brooklyn, New York; Eyedea's
- Genre: Alternative hip-hop
- Length: 26:19
- Label: Third Earth Music

Oddjobs chronology
Fun Boy (2002)	The Shopkeeper's Wife (2003)	Expose Negative (2005)

The Shopkeeper's Wife is an EP by Minnesota alternative hip-hop group Oddjobs. It was released in 2003 by Third Earth Music.

== History ==
A six-song EP, The Shopkeeper's Wife was the followup to Oddjobs' most critically and commercially successful album, 2002's Drums.

It was the band's last album to chart, reaching No. 40 on the CMJ New Music Report hip-hop albums chart in 2003. The Third Earth record label closed in 2004.

One song on The Shopkeeper's Wife was originally recorded for the 1999 cassette-only release The Whereabouts of Hidden Bridges, a collaboration with Minneapolis rapper Eyedea.

== Reception ==
The Shopkeeper's Wife
Review scores
Source	Rating
AllMusic	4.5/5 stars
Bbarak.cz	9/10 stars

Stanton Swihart of AllMusic called The Shopkeeper's Wife "exceptionally sophisticated, extraordinary music" and "the vanguard of hip-hop, rap as brain food. Rap as soul extension."

Prince Paul of the website XLR8R praised the album for its "dark, quality production (and) good rhyme-flows", and went on to say that "If you get high or if you are the serious mad-at-the-world type, you’ll love this."

J.C. Carnahan of Orlando, Florida magazine Impact Press compared Oddjobs favorably to The Roots and De La Soul, praising the layered production and the lyrics, which the magazine said "offers plenty of thought food to take in."

== Track listing ==
No.	Title	Length
1.	"Hypnotized"	4:36
2.	"The Mighty Fine"	3:34
3.	"The Shopkeeper's Wife"	4:21
4.	"Tricked"	3:56
5.	"Burden Streak"	5:49
6.	"Transparent"	4:07

== Credits ==
- Lyrics: Advizer, Crescent Moon, Nomi
- Producer: Anatomy, Deetalx
- Mastered By Chris Rocco
- Mixed By Joe Mabbott
- Photography: Octavio De Alva
