= Bryant-Lake Bowl =

Bowling alley, restaurant, bar, and theatre in Minnesota

Coordinates: 44°56′54.72″N 93°17′24.52″W

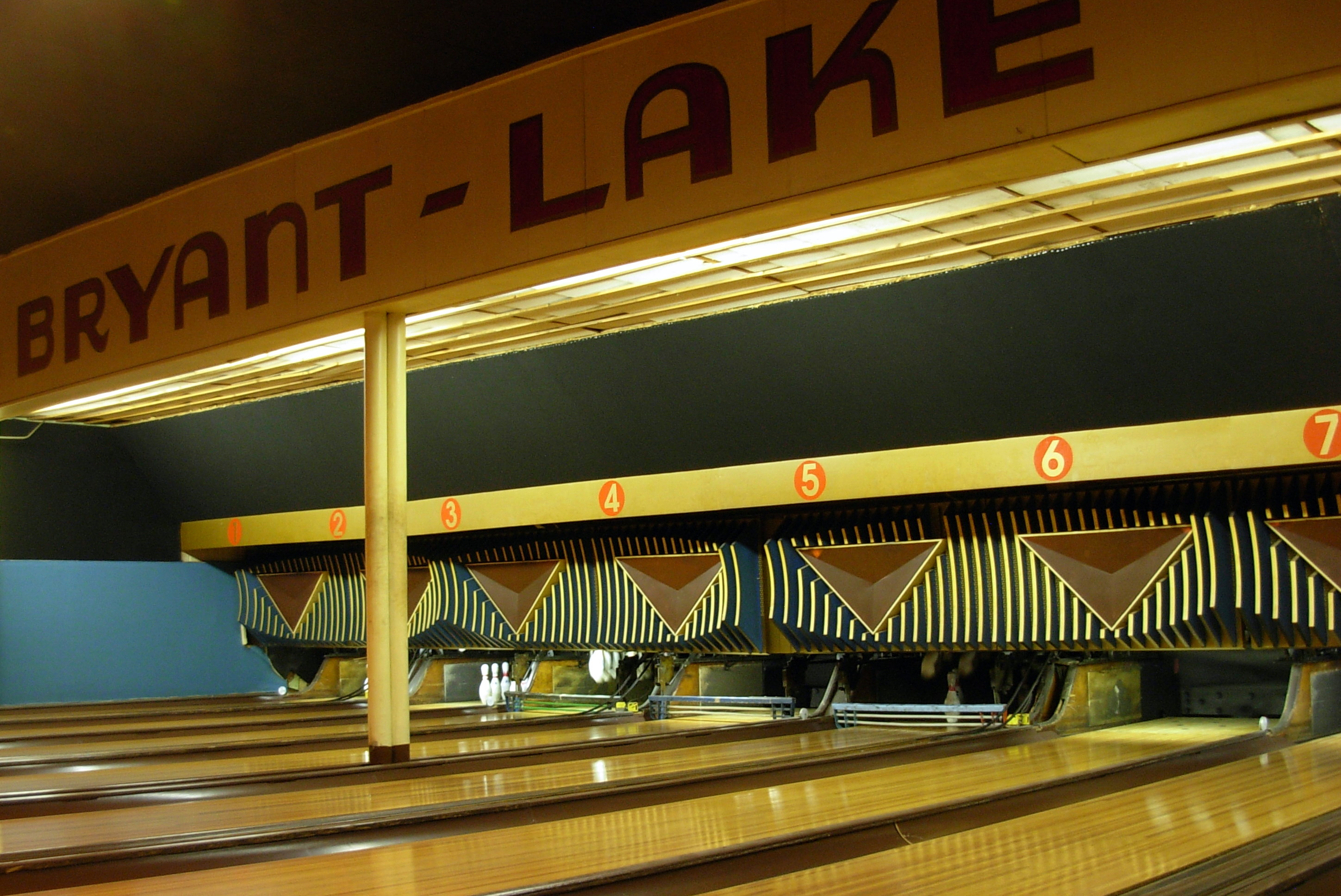
- Bowling lanes at Bryant-Lake
- Interactive map of Bryant-Lake Bowl
- Address: 810 West Lake St.
- Location: Minneapolis, Minnesota
- Type: Restaurant, theater, and bowling alley

Construction
- Opened: 1936

Website
- bryantlakebowl.com

Bryant-Lake Bowl, locally nicknamed BLB, is a bowling alley, restaurant, bar, and 90-seat theatre in Uptown Minneapolis, Minnesota. Best known for its evening entertainment and Cheap Date Night specials (two meals, drinks, and a round of bowling for $28) BLB is also a reliable brunch stop. The theatre is a venue for cabaret and wide variety of other stage productions. It is a host of the annual Minnesota Fringe Festival.

Originally a garage, the building was converted into a bowling alley in 1936. In 1959, Minnesota bowling champion Bill Drouches bought the bowling alley. Kim Bartmann bought the business in 1993, restoring the building, opening a restaurant, and converting the game room into a 90-seat theatre. In 2018, Bryant-Lake Bowl was sold by Bartmann to longtime employee Erica Gilbert.

Bryant-Lake Bowl was featured in a 2008 episode of Food Network's Diners, Drive-Ins and Dives, hosted by Guy Fieri. It has also been credited as inspiring the name of the band Lake Street Dive.

In 2004, Bryant-Lake Bowl hosted the signing ceremony for a city ordinance making Minneapolis restaurants and bars free of tobacco smoke.

In 2021, Bryant-Lake Bowl released an 87-second promotional video called Right Up Our Alley, made in one continuous shot by drone operator Jay Christensen, which went viral and garnered praise from several critics.

In 2025, Bryant-Lake Bowl was named fourth-best bowling alley in the United States in a Newsweek readers' poll.

The bar's theater hosts regular shows by theater companies and musicians. Several live albums have been recorded there, including Dan Wilson's 1998 Dan Wilson Live @ Bryant Lake Bowl, Oddjobs' Live! at the Bryant-Lake Bowl, 17–18 August 2001, and Koerner, Ray & Glover's 1996 album One Foot in the Groove.
