= Absorbing Playtime =

EP by Oddjobs
- Released: 2000
- Genre: Alternative hip-hop
- Length: 41:46
- Label: CMI Records

Oddjobs chronology
The Whereabouts of Hidden Bridges (1999)	Absorbing Playtime (2000)	Live! at the Bryant-Lake Bowl, 17–18 August 2001 (2001)

Absorbing Playtime
Review scores
Source	Rating
AllMusic	4/5 stars
Fake For Real	(positive)

Absorbing Playtime is an EP by Minnesota alternative hip-hop group Oddjobs. It was released in 2000 by CMI Records.

== History ==
The Oddjobs quintet formed out of a collaboration between students from two Minneapolis and St. Paul schools around 1995, part of a larger subculture that produced other rap acts such as Kanser and Heiruspecs. They had released a full-length debut album, 1999's Conflict & Compromise, and a few shorter works including the Eyedea collaboration The Whereabouts of Hidden Bridges, when two of the members, rapper Advizer (Adam Waytz) and producer/DJ Deetalx (Devon Callahan), moved to New York City to go to college.

The group did not break up, but instead used the opportunity to begin networking in New York, not only a much larger city but one with a close connection to hip-hop's roots and a vibrant support structure for the music-business side. The 10-song EP Absorbing Playtime was recorded while the crew was split between cities, recording over the telephone and sending files back and forth over email and the postal service. Afterwards, the band decided that recording Absorbing Playtime had been rewarding enough despite the long-distance issues for the remaining Minnesota-based members to move to New York also; this would lead to their most commercially successful album, 2003's Drums.

== Reception ==
Stanton Swihart of Allmusic said the record was a mark of a new level of artistic maturity for the group, calling it their "first recording of consequence." He described the album as "a long-distance relationship bottled on wax. ... Despite its fragmentary genesis, the generous-length EP was hands-down one of the most exciting creations to hit the hip-hop world in 2000, a veritable playground of innovative beats and equally exceptional lyrical dispatches from the progressive side of the prairie. (The songs) demand concentrated examination. There's something special going on here."

Star Tribune music critic Chris Riemenschneider was more lukewarm, saying that the album "had a few strong tracks but felt too piecemeal."

The album got a warm reception in Europe. French website Fake For Real wrote positively about Absorbing Playtime , calling it "definitely worth the investment," and particularly praised "The Distance Song", calling it "an incredibly colorful and nuanced composition". French website Hiphopcore called Oddjobs' albums Absorbing Playtime and Drums "highlights of this beginning of the century, with their irreproachable productions, their skillful audacity and their subtle mix between samples and acoustic instruments."

== Track listing ==
No.	Title	Length
1.	"Oscillations At 40 Hz"	4:06
2.	"Liberal Arts"	3:54
3.	"The Distance Song"	4:29
4.	"Peace Land Bread"	3:33
5.	"Visiting Hours"	4:00
6.	"Absorbing Playtime"	4:08
7.	"The Fusebox"	4:35
8.	"The Distance Beat (Instrumentalude)"	3:07
9.	"Sleep Walk"	5:41
10.	"Fun"	4:10

== Credits ==
- Lyrics: Advizer, Crescent Moon
- Producer, Scratches: Anatomy, Deetalx
