= Drums (Oddjobs album) =

Studio album by Oddjobs
- Released: March 9, 2002
- Studios: The Blue Lounge, Brooklyn, New York
- Genre: Alternative hip-hop
- Length: 70:04
- Label: Third Earth Music

Oddjobs chronology
| Live! at the Bryant-Lake Bowl, 17–18 August 2001 (2001) | Drums (2002) | Fun Boy (2002) |

Drums is a studio album by American hip-hop group Oddjobs. It was released on November 9, 2002, on Third Earth Music.

Drums was the group's most successful album both critically and commercially. It reached No. 30 on the CMJ New Music Report hip-hop albums chart in January 2003. Stanton Swihart of Allmusic called Drums one of the most impressive rap albums of 2002, saying, "With its vistas of somber psychedelia, it is a gorgeous extension of DJ Shadow's astral explorations".

== History ==
The Oddjobs quintet formed in Minneapolis and St. Paul around 1995. After some local success with their album Conflict & Compromise, the group was physically separated when two of the members, rapper Advizer (Adam Waytz) and producer/DJ Deetalx (Devon Callahan), moved to New York City to go to college. The group did not break up, but instead used the opportunity to begin networking in New York, not only a much larger city but one with a close connection to hip-hop's roots and a vibrant support structure for the music-business side. The 10-song EP Absorbing Playtime was recorded while the crew was split between cities. Afterwards, the remaining Minnesota-based members moved to New York also; this would lead to their most commercially successful period, including Drums. They signed with indie label Third Earth Records and Caroline Distribution, boosting their marketing and commercial reach.

In advance of Drums, Oddjobs released two singles. The first, "Blue Collar Holler", was described by Crescent Moon as "our sort of calling-card party track, the ear candy that will get you to taste the rest of the album." Reggie Royston of the St. Paul Pioneer Press called it "the group's anthem, marrying '70s organ funk with a clowning, jump-up rap intensity reminiscent of early '90s crews like the Pharcyde." "Blue Collar Holler" reached No. 6 on the Hip-Hop singles chart of CMJ New Music Monthly in July 2002. It was also named one of the top Minnesota-made songs of 2002 in a Star Tribune poll of Twin Cities critics. A second single, "Dry Bones", featured a remix with Aesop Rock, Vast Aire of Cannibal Ox, and Kimani of Masterminds.

Drums reached No. 30 on the CMJ New Music Report hip-hop albums chart in 2003.

== Reception ==
Professional ratings
Review scores
| Source | Rating |
|---|---|
| AllMusic | 4.5/5 stars |
| RapReviews | 7/10 stars |

The album received largely positive reviews. Swihart's AllMusic writeup called Drums "an exceptional backdrop of liquid tracks that fluidly fuse live musicianship and nimble sampler experimentation. Drums brilliantly roams through a broad range of styles, from cunning metaphysical puzzles to dark, speculative meditations." He particularly praised "Blue Collar Holler", calling it "a masterpiece of shifting textures and tonalities, and its roll call of working-class livelihoods plays like a funky Midwestern manifesto." Soren Baker of the Chicago Tribune called Drums an "impressive" album and compared Oddjobs' "cerebral" style of hip-hop to Jurassic 5.

The Pioneer Press' Reggie Royston, comparing it to the previous disc Live! at the Bryant-Lake Bowl, said that "while that album captures the earnestness of Twin Cities underground rap, Drums is what happens when you take that sound and drop it in New York: carefree, coastless rap backed by a dense cake of cosmopolitan beats. ... On the three-part "Dream for Molle," playful rap storytelling accompanies a 20-minute suite of sprawling drum-'n'-bass, avant-garde jazz and funk. Like experimental hip-hop purveyors cLOUDDEAD, Drums strikes at something new with its sound collages, mixing Beastie Boy funk with psychedelic grooves."

Peter S. Scholtes of Minneapolis' City Pages praised the album as "so loose and weird that you half expect the rappers to pass the mic out the window to a jogger or a talking police horse." Scholtes felt that the album reflected the loneliness of five young people from a smaller town trying to make it in New York. "A sort of loneliness pervades Drums, with its longing references to 'Shots Paul' and Minnehaha Creek."

French website Hiphopcore called Oddjobs' albums Absorbing Playtime and Drums "highlights of this beginning of the century, with their irreproachable productions, their skillful audacity and their subtle mix between samples and acoustic instruments."

Matt Jost of RapReviews gave the album 7 of 10 stars, but complained that "telling the three rappers apart can be difficult. They all have a similar, relaxed approach . As their rhymes flow at the same, steady pace and the voices become interchangeable, you realize that these guys share more than just a flat in Brooklyn." But he also praised the "'get up, get involved' vibe" of "Blue Collar Holler" and the "slowly blossoming beauty of 'Dream for Molle', a trilogy where the producers seize the opportunity to outshine the rappers."

== Track listing ==
| No. | Title | Length |
|---|---|---|
| 1. | "Introduction" | 0:21 |
| 2. | "Time Flies" (Congas – Booka B; Guitar – Josh Peterson; Vocals – Anjuli Kolb) | 4:44 |
| 3. | "Scary Mary Revisited" | 3:31 |
| 4. | "Blue Collar Holler" (Keyboards – Russell Sticklor) | 3:35 |
| 5. | "Wolves In Wool" | 2:44 |
| 6. | "Dry Bones" | 3:59 |
| 7. | "Dream For Molle (I)" (Bass – Twinkie Jiggles; Drums – Graham O'Brian; Keyboards – Russell Sticklor) | 5:50 |
| 8. | "Dream for Molle (II)" (Bass – Twinkie Jiggles) | 2:54 |
| 9. | "Dream for Molle (III)" (Bass – Twinkie Jiggles; Drums – Graham O'Brian) | 1:45 |
| 10. | "The Backstroke" (Keyboards – Russell Sticklor) | 5:03 |
| 11. | "Hit Em With A High" | 3:15 |
| 12. | "Naked City" | 4:06 |
| 13. | "Murder Plot Twist" | 4:48 |
| 14. | "Shore" (Guitar – Guitarzan; Keyboards – Russell Sticklor; Saxophone – Sean Behling) | 5:11 |
| 15. | "Twinkvizomy" (Bass – Twinkie Jiggles) | 4:24 |
| 16. | "The Shopkeeper's Wife" | 4:50 |
| 17. | "Gospel (Encore)" (Bass – Twinkie Jiggles) | 9:04 |

== Credits ==
- Artwork: Tyson Jones
- Design: Lyndon Kennedy
- Lyrics By: Advizer, Crescent Moon, Nomi
- Mastered By: Emily Lazar, Sarah Register
- Mixed By: Rory Romano, Brian Montgomery (tracks 12, 16), Mike Herman (tracks 2, 4-9, 14, 17)
- Producer: Anatomy
- Producer, Scratches, Engineer, Recorded By: Deetalx
- Written By: A. Waytz, A. Casselle, D. Callahan, M. Demira, S. Lewis
