= Eyenine =

American hip hop musical artist

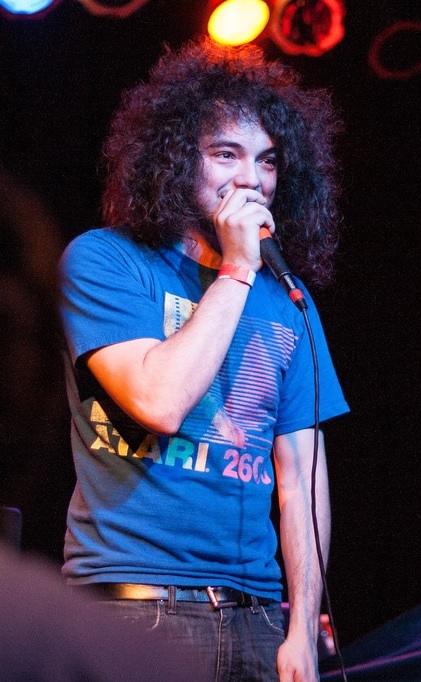
- Eyenine performing at Port City Music Hall

Background information
- Born: Michael Gene Dionne; September 4, 1985 (age 40); Nashua, New Hampshire, United States
- Origin: Dover, New Hampshire, United States
- Genres: Hip hop
- Occupations: Rapper, musical artist
- Years active: 2007–present
- Labels: Flyrock Records, Real Hood Music LLC
- Website: www.eyeninemusic.com

Michael Gene Dionne (born September 4, 1985), better known by his stage name Eyenine, is an American hip hop recording artist from Dover, New Hampshire.

Eyenine began writing and recording music at the age of 16, inspired by acts including Eyedea, Sage Francis, Adeem and Atmosphere. In his twenties, Eyenine began touring the country with such acts as PT Burnem, Paulie Think, Ecid, Prhym8 and Farout. He helped found an upstart recording label called Flyrock Records which released multiple albums from various New England artists including The If In Life, Rio Bravo, The Nasty and others. After years of freestyling at the weekly Rap Night in Portland, Maine he entered and won two separate Ruckus Cup Classic battle tournaments. He went on to win two separate Church of Providence battle tournaments hosted by B. Dolan and refereed by Sage Francis and later came out of battle rap retirement to win the first Overcast battle championship in Cincinnati, OH, the birthplace of the Scribble Jam, in 2018.

== Career ==
Eyenine began his career in New Hampshire doing local shows around the area. He was one of the founding members of the label Flyrock Records, which released albums and hosted shows in the New England area. Eyenine and Flyrock Records were featured in an episode of Chronicle. He was able to work with his biggest influence, Eyedea before his untimely passing on his album Afraid to Dream. After two full length releases, he began touring the nation and building up a fanbase which eventually caught the attention of RZA of the Wu Tang Clan. RZA invited Eyenine to join him on the Major Motion Picture Soundtrack tour for The Man with the Iron Fists across the country from Brooklyn, New York City to Los Angeles, California. Since then, Eyenine released his third studio album, Dissembler in 2013, toured with GZA, and has done shows with Ghostface Killah, U-God, Raekwon, Killah Priest and many others.

In May 2019, after a five year hiatus from recording and releasing albums, Eyenine teamed up with The Lonely Ghosts to release a full length titled A Reason for Departure. His fourth solo studio album, titled A Little Above Low Key, was released in 2021.

== Touring ==
Eyenine has done many tours over the course of his career, ranging from self funded DIY tours to Major Motion Picture Soundtrack tours such as “The Man With the Iron Fists” alongside Rza, U-God, Supernatural and more. He has performed at SXSW multiple years. Recently, he has toured the country with fellow acts ECID and Farout multiple times and continued the trend into 2019 in support of his fourth studio album, A Little Above Low Key.

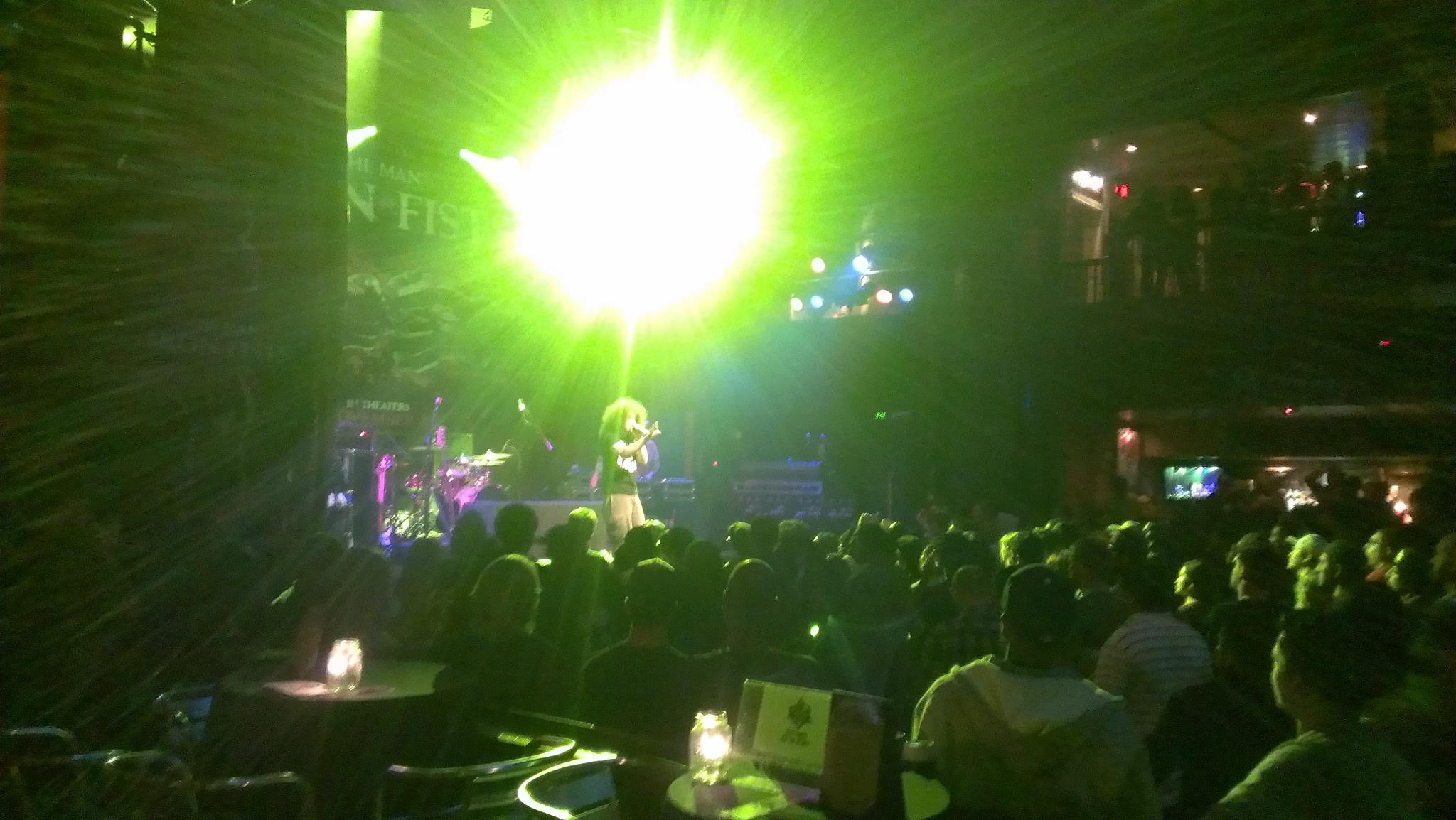
Eyenine performing at the House of Blues in Las Vegas

During the lockdown, Eyenine continued to perform via livestream festivals through 2020. Since then, he has gone on a yearly tour with Jarv, Dillon and Mister Burns along with local shows across New England. He is currently supporting his upcoming album with DC The MIDI Alien, titled Fast Radio Bursts.

== Discography ==
=== Studio albums ===
- the insomnia sessions (2009)
- afraid to dream (2011)
- Dissembler (2013)
- A Reason for Departure (2019)
- A Little Above Low Key (2021)
- Fast Radio Bursts (2026)

=== Non-studio albums ===
- $ece$$ion split w/The If in Life (2007)
- free music (2010)
- the narcolepsy sessions (2014)
