= Face Candy =

American hip hop group

- Also known as: Eyedea and Friends
- Origin: Saint Paul, Minnesota, United States
- Genres: Jazz Rap, alternative, conscious, experimental, indie, underground hip hop
- Years active: 2005–2011
- Labels: Rhymesayers, Crushkill Recordings
- Members: Eyedea, Kristoff Krane, J.T Bates, Casey O'Brien
- Website: myspace.com/facecandy

Face Candy was an American improvisational jazz rap group led by rapper Eyedea in Saint Paul, Minnesota. The group released one album, This Is Where We Were, in 2006. The initial lineup on the album consisted of Eyedea, Kristoff Krane, J.T. Bates, and Casey O'Brien until Eyedea's sudden death in 2010. The group released a second album in 2011, Waste Age Teenland.

== History ==
=== Eyedea & Friends ===
Formed in 2005 as Eyedea & Friends the group originally consisted of well known freestyle battle champion and underground rapper Eyedea with drummer J.T. Bates, (also of Eyedea's rock band Carbon Carousel), bassist Casey O'Brien, and local rappers Kristoff Krane (also of Abzorber), Carnage, and Mazta I. The group started playing shows at local hip-hop oriented venues where much of the audience which showed up was expecting the music be similar to Eyedea's solo work and work as part of Eyedea & Abilities. However the Eyedea and Friends shows actually consisted entirely of extended freestyles with freely improvised instrumental backing. This led to disappointment and anger in many of the fans who in turn booed and threw objects at the group. After the first tour the group stopped performing for a while due partly to the negative reaction. However the project was revived with the new name Face Candy and found a better reaction to the music playing now that fans knew what to expect and through playing Jazz venues where the crowds were more receptive to the group's sound.

=== This Is Where We Were (2005) ===
This Is Where We Were was recorded live in 2005 while the group was touring the American Midwest. The album was released on November 21, 2006.

=== Change in lineup ===
Carnage and Mazta I left in 2006 reducing the group to a four-man line up they continued to perform and record new material. Eyedea died in his sleep on October 16, 2010 due to an overdose.

=== Waste Age Teenland (2011) ===
In mid 2011, it was confirmed the second album Waste Age Teenland would be released posthumously by Rhymesayers. This album was recorded in two days at the Winterland studios and one night in front of an audience at Black Dog Cafe in Saint Paul. It was released May 24, 2011, seven months after Eyedea's death.

== Members ==
The band had several lineups.

=== Initial members ===
- Eyedea (deceased) – Vocals
- Carnage – Vocals, Human percussion
- Mazta I – Vocals

=== Later members ===
- Kristoff Krane – Vocals
- J.T. Bates – Drums
- Casey O'Brien – Bass

== Discography ==
- This Is Where We Were (2006)
- Waste Age Teenland (2011)
