= Fun Boy =

EP by Oddjobs
- Released: 2002
- Genre: Alternative hip-hop
- Length: 26:38

Oddjobs chronology
Drums (2002)	Fun Boy (2002)	The Shopkeeper's Wife (2003)

Fun Boy is an EP by Minnesota alternative hip-hop group Oddjobs. It was self-released by the band in 2002 as a limited-edition Japan-only release, but was widely bootlegged, giving it an underground listenership in the U.S.

== History ==
The band unofficially circulated the Fun Boy EP around the time of the 2000 release of Absorbing Playtime. It got an official release in 2002, but as a limited-edition Japan-only release that was widely bootlegged. The Japan-only release was done despite that the band had no plans to tour Japan at the time, nor did it ever. Band member Stephen "Anatomy" Lewis told the French website Hiphopcore that the Japanese release was meant as something of a joke and that Oddjobs doesn't know what Japanese listeners actually thought of the album. He noted that the fact that it nevertheless sold out must be a good sign: "Yeah, we sold them all, so they must have liked it!"

== Reception ==
Fun Boy
Review scores
Source	Rating
AllMusic	2.5/5 stars

Stanton Swihart of AllMusic criticized Fun Boy as shallow and slapdash, but nevertheless called it "a buoyant, whimsical listen. ... It has a loose, even sloppy, energy, and plays at times like a slapdash party mix or a messy, spirited live show."

== Track listing ==
No.	Title	Length
1.	"Funboys" (Bass: Sean McPherson)	3:53
2.	"Amish Woodshed"	3:48
3.	"The Sex Rapper"	4:33
4.	"B96"	2:34
5.	"BBQ Wings And A Prayer"	3:46
6.	"Principal's Office" (Bass: Sean McPherson)	4:35
7.	"Yeah You Bad"	2:43
