= E&A =

Studio album by Eyedea & Abilities
- Released: March 23, 2004
- Genre: Hip-hop
- Length: 46:52
- Labels: Epitaph; Rhymesayers
- Producers: DJ Abilities; DJ Infamous

Eyedea & Abilities chronology
First Born (2001)	E&A (2004)	By the Throat (2009)

Singles from E&A
- 1. "Now" Released: 2004

E&A is the second studio album by American hip-hop duo Eyedea & Abilities. It was released on Epitaph Records and Rhymesayers Entertainment on March 23, 2004.

== Critical reception ==
Professional ratings
Review scores
Source	Rating
Blender	4/5 stars
City Pages	mixed
Drowned in Sound	9/10
Exclaim!	favorable
Pitchfork	6.0/10
PopMatters	favorable
Stylus Magazine	B

Dan Kricke of Stylus Magazine commented that "it's more immediately accessible than First Born, and showcases a lot more of both Eyedea & Abilities talents than anything they've done previously." Vish Khanna, of Exclaim!, wrote, "Blending underground hunger with the confidence of accomplished veterans, Eyedea & Abilities bring some truly dynamic hip-hop to the table with their second album."

== Track listing ==
No.	Title	Length
1.	"Reintroducing"	2:18
2.	"Now"	4:24
3.	"Kept"	2:31
4.	"Exhausted Love"	5:22
5.	"Star Destroyer" (featuring Carnage)	3:46
6.	"Paradise"	6:34
7.	"One-Twenty"	3:14
8.	"Man vs. Ape"	2:49
9.	"Get Along"	0:59
10.	"Two Men and a Lady"	3:11
11.	"E&A Day"	3:07
12.	"Act Right"	4:06
13.	"Glass"	4:31
Total length:		46:52

== Personnel ==
Credits adapted from liner notes.

- Eyedea – vocals, lyrics, engineering, mixing
- DJ Abilities – production, turntables
- Carnage – vocals (5), lyrics (5)
- Sean McPherson – bass guitar (6, 10, 13)
- DJ Infamous – production (10), turntables (10)
- Gene Grimaldi – mastering
- George Thompson – artwork, design

== Charts ==
Chart	Peak position
US Heatseekers Albums (Billboard)	37
US Independent Albums (Billboard)	25
