= Oddjobs =

American alternative hip-hop band from Minnesota

Background information
- Origin: Minnesota, United States, U.S.
- Genres: Alternative hip-hop
- Years active: 1996-2005
- Labels: Third Earth Music, CMI Productions
- Spinoffs: Kill the Vultures, Power Struggle
- Past members: Advizer (Adam Waytz); Crescent Moon (Alexei Casselle); Nomi (Mario Demira); Anatomy (Stephen Lewis); Deetalx (Devon Callahan)

Oddjobs was an alternative hip-hop group from Minnesota formed in 1995. The band released three studio albums and several EPs including 2003's critically praised Drums; they broke up in 2005 and re-formed as Kill the Vultures and Power Struggle.

== History ==
Oddjobs was a quintet consisting of three rappers—Advizer (Adam Waytz), Crescent Moon (Alexei Casselle), and Nomi (Mario Demira)—and two producer/DJs—Anatomy (Stephen Lewis) and Deetalx (Devon Callahan).

The group was part of a regional hip-hop subculture based in the Twin Cities which developed in the mid-1990s and included Atmosphere and the Rhymesayers collective, Eyedea & Abilities, Doomtree, Heiruspecs, and Brother Ali. Oddjobs has been credited with helping bring Minnesota hip-hop greater attention and respect in both the U.S. and Europe. Stanton Swihart of AllMusic credits the band with helping to instill a postmodern viewpoint into rap, inspired by artists such as De La Soul and the Beastie Boys. Oddjobs has drawn comparisons to underground hip-hop group Jurassic 5 for the interweaving rhyming of its multiple MCs; to DJ Shadow for their embrace of jazz, psychedelia, and funk; and to fellow Minneapolis group Atmosphere for its combination of exuberant performance and sometimes dark lyrics. Soren Baker of the Chicago Tribune said, "Oddjobs' music is moody and cerebral, with spare, jazzy beats and rhymes that focus more on verbal dexterity and wittiness than materialism or violence."

Oddjobs toured or performed with DJ Shadow, De La Soul, Blackalicious, El-P, Atmosphere, Buck 65, Eyedea and Abilities, and Cannibal Ox, among others.

=== Formation and early work ===
Oddjobs began as a collaboration between students from South High School in Minneapolis and St. Paul Central High School in Saint Paul, Minnesota around 1995. Oddjobs was itself a splinter group of a larger 30-member collective called Cases Of Mistaken Identity, or CMI, which included graffiti artists and break dancers. The same scene produced other rap acts like Kanser and Heiruspecs. The CMI collective put out a cassette, Case Studies, in 1998 but soon only the core group of five remained. "Oddjobs was... everyone who was serious enough to want to continue music after high school," Casselle told the French web site Hiphopcore.

Oddjobs’ 1999 debut album, Conflict & Compromise, was made when the band members were about 15 years old. It was recorded at the home studio of Jason Heinrichs, also known as Anomaly, who had also recorded the earlier CMI record. About 1,000 copies of the album were produced. Looking back on the album a decade later both Anatomy and Crescent Moon viewed it as a stepping stone to later, better work. "It was... a necessary trial and error. It's all about trying to figure out what kind of music you're trying to make, what your contribution will be," said Casselle. Anatomy had a slightly different take: "It's very immature; it's pretty bad I think." The group collaborated with Eyedea on the 1999 cassette-only release The Whereabouts of Hidden Bridges, recorded in only a week on a four-track tape. Advizer later said that the recording sessions were "one of the most enjoyable musical experiences I have had." A song from that session was later used on the 2003 Oddjobs EP The Shopkeeper's Wife.

The quintet graduated from high school in 1998. Deetalx and Advizer moved to New York to go to college. The next Oddjobs disc, the 10-song EP Absorbing Playtime, was recorded while the membership was split between cities, recording over the telephone and sending files back and forth over email. Stanton Swihart of AllMusic called it "hands-down one of the most exciting creations to hit the hip-hop world in 2000, a veritable playground of innovative beats and equally exceptional lyrical dispatches from the progressive side of the prairie." Roaming the Tracks, a Deetalx mix CD, appeared in 2001. Recording Absorbing Playtime had been rewarding despite the long-distance problems, which the band decided to resolve by having the remaining Minnesota-based members also move to New York. This also allowed them "to be closer to hip-hop's birthplace," as one newspaper account put it, and to be closer to the music-business opportunities for indie hip-hop in New York City.

The band unofficially circulated the EP Fun Boy around the time of the release of Absorbing Playtime. It got an official release in 2002, but as a limited-edition release only in Japan which was widely bootlegged. Swihart criticized it as shallow and slapdash, but nevertheless called it "a buoyant, whimsical listen." Just before moving to New York, the band recorded Live! at the Bryant-Lake Bowl, 17–18 August 2001, a concert album featuring Chicago quartet Typical Cats and Twin Cities group Heiruspecs. Swihart of AllMusic said that although the album was not as tight as their studio work, "what the music lacks in precision and depth it makes up for with energy and punch". Star Tribune music critic Chris Riemenschneider named Live at the Bryant-Lake Bowl No. 9 in his top 10 Minnesota records of 2001, saying "few rap albums have the instrumental thickness of 'gospel' and 'Absorbing Playtime', and hardly any offer as much raw energy. "

=== New York: Drums, Shopkeeper's Wife ===
Once in New York, the Oddjobs crew moved into a shared house in Fort Greene, a neighborhood in Brooklyn. They signed with indie label Third Earth Records and Caroline Distribution, boosting their marketing and commercial reach. In advance of their second full-length album, 2002's Drums, Oddjobs released two singles. The first, "Blue Collar Holler," was described by Crescent Moon as "our sort of calling-card party track, the ear candy that will get you to taste the rest of the album." Reggie Royston of the St. Paul Pioneer Press called it "the group's anthem, marrying '70s organ funk with a clowning, jump-up rap intensity reminiscent of early '90s crews like the Pharcyde." "Blue Collar Holler" reached No. 6 on the Hip-Hop singles chart of CMJ New Music Monthly in July 2002. It was also named one of the top Minnesota-made songs of 2002 in a Star Tribune poll of Twin Cities critics. A second single, "Dry Bones", featured a remix with Aesop Rock, Vast Aire of Cannibal Ox, and Kimani of Masterminds.

Drums was the group's most successful album both critically and commercially. It reached No. 30 on the CMJ New Music Report hip-hop albums chart in January 2003. Swihart of Allmusic called Drums one of the most impressive rap albums of 2002, saying, "With its vistas of somber psychedelia, it is a gorgeous extension of DJ Shadow's astral explorations". Reggie Royston of the St. Paul Pioneer Press compared it to Live! at the Bryant Lake Bowl, the previous album, saying that "while that album captures the earnestness of Twin Cities underground rap, Drums is what happens when you take that sound and drop it in New York: carefree, coastless rap backed by a dense cake of cosmopolitan beats... Like experimental hip-hop purveyors cLOUDDEAD, Drums strikes at something new with its sound collages, mixing Beastie Boys funk with psychedelic grooves." Peter S. Scholtes of City Pages praised the album as "so loose and weird that you half expect the rappers to pass the mic out the window to a jogger or a talking police horse." Scholtes felt that the album reflected the loneliness of five young people from a smaller town trying to make it in New York. "A sort of loneliness pervades Drums, with its longing references to 'Shots Paul' and Minnehaha Creek", he said.

The six-song EP The Shopkeeper's Wife was released in 2003. Swihart of Allmusic praised it calling it "exceptionally sophisticated, extraordinary music" and "the vanguard of hip-hop, rap as brain food. Rap as soul extension." It was the band's last album to chart, reaching No. 40 on the CMJ New Music Report hip-hop albums chart in 2003.

The Third Earth record label closed in 2004.

=== Berkeley, Expose Negative, and breakup ===
Oddjobs opened for Atmosphere on the Seven's Travels tour in 2003. Seeking a change of pace, the group moved from New York back to Minnesota and then to Berkeley, California, to work on a new album. "It was kind of a dark period" for the band, Nomi wrote later and led to the group's breakup.

The musical visions of the group's two producers, Deetalx and Anatomy, had begun to diverge before the last Oddjobs record, Expose Negative. Eventually it grew into two separate projects. Expose Negative became entirely a Deetalx production; Anatomy worked on what became the debut self-titled record by Kill the Vultures. Casselle said in a 2006 interview, "Oddjobs was always very producer-based, so Steve and Devon had a very large role in the directions of the songs we were making. I think when it came down to it, it was really the two of them having different creative opinions." In an interview with Hiphopcore, Anatomy reflected, "I wanted to make something that was really minimalist, trashy and noisy, but [Deetalx] wanted to make a more high quality hip-hop album... we had different ideas." The creative differences turned out to be insoluble, and the group broke up in 2004. The last Oddjobs album, Expose Negative was released in 2005 on New York's Raptivism Records.

=== Post-breakup ===
Lewis and Casselle moved back to Minnesota, forming the new group Kill the Vultures, which briefly included Nomi and Advizer as well, pursuing an interest in less mainstream, riskier material influenced by film noir and jazz. Their 2005 debut, Kill the Vultures, was followed by a string of albums and EPs into the mid-2010s.

Deetalx and Nomi remained in Berkeley and formed Power Struggle, which released four albums between 2005 and 2014. Nomi had originally split his time between both Kill the Vultures and Power Struggle, but the latter band increasingly became his focus, giving him an outlet for his interest in Filipino culture and progressive social and political activism. Deetalx, conversely, became less involved, appearing on the entirety of the 2005 album Arson at the Petting Factory but less than half of 2008's Hearts and Minds. He left Power Struggle before 2010's Remittances and 2014's In Your Hands.

Advizer (Adam Waytz) graduated from Columbia University and became a neuropsychologist at Northwestern University in Chicago.

== Band members ==
- Advizer (Adam Waytz): rapper
- Crescent Moon (Alexei Casselle): rapper
- Nomi (Mario Demira): rapper
- Anatomy (Stephen Lewis): producer/DJ
- Deetalx (Devon Callahan): producer/DJ

== Discography ==
=== Studio albums ===
- Conflict & Compromise (Interlock Records, 1999)
- Drums (Third Earth Music, 2002)
- Expose Negative (Raptivism, 2005)

=== Live albums ===
- Live! at the Bryant-Lake Bowl, 17–18 August 2001 (2001) with Typical Cats and Heiruspecs (CMI Records, 2001)

=== EPs ===
- The Whereabouts of Hidden Bridges (Advizer, Crescent Moon, and DJ Anatomy w/ Eyedea) (1999)
- Absorbing Playtime (CMI Records, 2000)
- Fun Boy (2002)
- The Shopkeeper's Wife (Third Earth Music, 2003)

=== Singles ===
- "Dry Bones" (2002)
- "Blue Collar Holler" (2002)

=== Guest appearances ===
- Sixth Sense - "Laws of Gravity" from Grand's Sixth Sense (2011): Posthumous release from Eyedea & Abilities, recorded in 1990s/early 2000s
