= By the Throat (Eyedea & Abilities album) =

Studio album by Eyedea & Abilities
- Released: July 21, 2009
- Genre: Hip-hop
- Length: 29:53
- Label: Rhymesayers
- Producer: DJ Abilities; Eyedea

Eyedea & Abilities chronology
E&A (2004)	By the Throat (2009)	Grand's Sixth Sense (2011)

By the Throat is the third and final studio album by American hip-hop duo Eyedea & Abilities. It was released on July 21, 2009, via Rhymesayers Entertainment. The album was supported by music videos for the songs "Junk" and "Smile".

In the United States, the album debuted at number 38 on the Independent Albums and number 9 on the Heatseekers Albums charts. Following Eyedea's death in October 2010, the album peaked at number 91 on the US Top R&B/Hip-Hop Albums chart, marking the duo's final album to be released during his lifetime.

== Critical reception ==
Professional ratings
Aggregate scores
Source	Rating
Metacritic	76/100
Review scores
Source	Rating
Alternative Press	3.5/5
HipHopDX	2.5/5
PopMatters	9/10
RapReviews	9/10
Spectrum Culture	3/5
Urb	4/5 stars

By the Throat was met with generally favorable reviews from music critics. At Metacritic, which assigns a normalized rating out of 100 to reviews from mainstream publications, the album received an average score of 76 based on six reviews.

Andrew Dietzel of PopMatters praised the album, stating: "By the Throat, succinct and emotive, is the perfect convergence of styles, attacking the listener's jugular with a powerful punk thrust, cynical observations, and an out-and-out assault on hip-hop's standards". John-Michael Bond of RapReviews called it "an emotional and creative masterpiece in the genre of hip hop". Adam Figman of Urb wrote: "combined with newly found experiences, newly discovered self-awareness and newly refined skills, By the Throat catches this almost-forgotten duo at a new height of the pair's combined powers. Well worth the wait". Chris Parker of Alternative Press declared: "the duo of MC Eyedea and DJ Abilities have always possessed more potential than they've realized and By The Throat doesn't change that balance".

== Track listing ==
All tracks are written by Micheal David Larsen.

No.	Title	Length
1.	"Hay Fever"	2:20
2.	"Spin Cycle"	3:39
3.	"Time Flies When You Have a Gun"	1:44
4.	"Burn Fetish"	2:55
5.	"Sky Diver"	4:16
6.	"Junk"	2:46
7.	"Forgive Me for My Synapses"	1:02
8.	"This Story"	2:33
9.	"Factory"	1:55
10.	"Smile"	4:02
11.	"By the Throat"	2:41
Total length:		29:53

== Personnel ==
- Micheal "Eyedea" Larsen – lyrics & vocals, guitar (tracks: 1, 3–6, 8–10), keyboards (tracks: 1, 4, 5, 7, 8, 10, 11), bass (tracks: 1, 9), percussion & drum programming (tracks: 2, 10), producer (tracks: 1, 5), recording, mixing
- Gregory "DJ Abilities" Keltgen – keyboards (tracks: 1, 3, 4, 7), turntables (tracks: 2, 4, 6–8, 10), bass (track 3), producer
- J.T. Bates – drums (track 1)
- Jeremy Ylvisaker – guitar (tracks: 2, 8, 11), bass (tracks: 2, 6), percussion (track 2)
- Casey O'Brien – bass (track 4)
- Brian Johnson – mixing, mastering
- Michael Gaughan – artwork
- Siddiq – layout, design

== Charts ==
Chart (2009–2010)	Peak position
US Top R&B/Hip-Hop Albums (Billboard)	91
US Independent Albums (Billboard)	38
US Heatseekers Albums (Billboard)	9
