= Expose Negative =

Studio album by Oddjobs
- Released: February 22, 2005
- Genre: Alternative hip-hop
- Length: 46:06
- Label: Raptivism

Oddjobs chronology
The Shopkeeper's Wife (2003)	Expose Negative (2005)

Expose Negative is the fifth and final album by Minnesota alternative hip-hop group Oddjobs. It was released in 2005 on New York label Raptivism Records.

== History ==
The Oddjobs quintet had moved from Minnesota to New York three and a half years before releasing Expose Negative, during which they had enjoyed their critical and commercial peak with their album Drums. But by 2004, the group's label, Third Ear, went out of business, and the band wound up moving to Berkeley, California, to work on a new album. "It was kind of a dark period" for the band, rapper Nomi (Mario Demira) wrote later, and led to the group's breakup. The musical visions of the group's two producers, Deetalx (Devon Callahan) and Anatomy (Stephen Lewis), had begun to diverge before the last Oddjobs record, Expose Negative. Eventually, this grew into two entirely separate projects. Expose Negative became entirely a Deetalx production, while Anatomy worked instead on what would become the debut self-titled record by Kill the Vultures.

Rapper Crescent Moon (Alexei Casselle) told an interviewer in 2006, "Oddjobs was always very producer-based, so Steve and Devon had a very large role in the directions of the songs we were making. I think when it came down to it, it was really the two of them having different creative opinions." In an interview with Hiphopcore, Anatomy reflected that "I wanted to make something that was really minimalist, trashy and noisy; but [Deetalx] wanted to make a more high quality hip-hop album. So we had different ideas."

The creative differences proved insoluble, and the group broke up in 2004. Expose Negative came out less than a year later, by which time Deetalx and Nomi had moved on to a new project, Power Struggle.

== Reception ==
French music critic Sylvain Bertot said that Expose Negative pointed to the direction that Power Struggle would take on its debut album Arson at the Petting Factory: "It was still a draft, an attempt, and it was probably not the direction that everyone wanted to take within Oddjobs. It was also a little too monolithic. ... It was a little less accomplished, it was a little less good."

Waymon Tinsdale of the magazine Roctober gave a succinct one-sentence review: "Should be called Blowjobs, because this sucks."

== Track listing ==
No.	Title	Length
1.	"En Pocket"	2:22
2.	"Minus 3"	2:27
3.	"Smoke"	3:36
4.	"The Alibi (Dekalb And Vanderbilt)"	3:58
5.	"Rather See You...Never"	2:35
6.	"Lynlake"	3:37
7.	"Minus 2 - Freestyle"	3:01
8.	"Self-Taught"	4:46
9.	"7th Street Entry - Minus 3"	7:03
10.	"Dear Parasite"	3:08
11.	"Bloody Knuckles"	3:36
12.	"Stone Cold"	5:57

== Credits ==
- Layout, design: Marshall Larada
- Lyrics by Advizer, Crescent Moon, Nomi
- Mastered by Bruce Templeton
- Mixed by Joe Mabbott
- Photography: Octavio Dealva, Marshall Larada
- Producer: Deetalx, Scratches [Cuts], Recorded By
- Written by Adam Waytz, Alexei Moon Casselle, Chaka Mkali, D. Callahan, Mario Demira
