= Semi.Official =

American hip hop group

- Origin: Minnesota, United States
- Genres: Hip hop
- Years active: 2003–present
- Labels: Rhymesayers Entertainment
- Members: I Self Devine; DJ Abilities
- Website: www.rhymesayers.com/semiofficial

Semi.Official is an American hip hop group from Minnesota. It consists of I Self Devine and DJ Abilities. The duo released the debut album, The Anti-Album, on Rhymesayers Entertainment in 2003. In 2011, Complex listed the track, "Grey", as one of the 25 Best Rhymesayers Songs.

== Discography ==
=== Albums ===
- The Anti-Album (2003)

=== Singles ===
- "Crime" (2003)
