= Live! at the Bryant-Lake Bowl, 17–18 August 2001 =

Live album by Oddjobs with Typical Cats and Heiruspecs
- Released: 2001
- Recorded: August 17–18, 2001
- Venue: Bryant-Lake Bowl, Minneapolis
- Genre: Alternative hip-hop
- Length: 1:00:46
- Label: CMI Records

Oddjobs with Typical Cats and Heiruspecs chronology
Absorbing Playtime (2000)	Live! at the Bryant-Lake Bowl, 17–18 August 2001 (2001)	Drums (2002)

Live at the Bryant Lake Bowl
Review scores
Source	Rating
AllMusic	3/5 stars

Live! at the Bryant-Lake Bowl, 17–18 August 2001 is a live album by Minnesota alternative hip-hop group Oddjobs. It was released in 2001 by CMI Records.

== History ==
The Oddjobs quintet formed out of a collaboration between students from two Minneapolis and St. Paul schools around 1995, part of a larger subculture that produced other rap acts such as Kanser and Heiruspecs. After graduation, the group was physically separated when two of the members, rapper Advizer (Adam Waytz) and producer/DJ Deetalx (Devon Callahan), moved to New York City to go to college. The group did not break up, but instead used the opportunity to begin networking in New York, not only a much larger city but one with a close connection to hip-hop's roots and a vibrant support structure for the music-business side. The 10-song EP Absorbing Playtime was recorded while the crew was split between cities. Afterwards, the remaining Minnesota-based members decided to move to New York also; this would lead to their most commercially successful album, 2003's Drums.

Just before moving to New York, the band recorded Live! at the Bryant-Lake Bowl, 17–18 August 2001, a concert album also featuring Chicago quartet Typical Cats and Twin Cities group Heiruspecs. It was recorded at Bryant-Lake Bowl, a theater, restaurant, and bowling alley in the Lyn-Lake neighborhood of Minneapolis. It was released in a limited edition of 1,000 copies on the band's own CMI Productions label.

== Reception ==
Stanton Swihart of Allmusic said that although the album was not as tight as their studio work, "what the music lacks in precision and depth it makes up for with energy and punch. ... In many respects, appreciating live hip-hop is purely a you-had-to-be-there situation, yet Live! at the Bryant-Lake Bowl is definitely worth tracking down".

Star Tribune music critic Chris Riemenschneider named Live at the Bryant-Lake Bowl No. 9 in his top 10 Minnesota records of 2001, saying "few rap albums have the instrumental thickness of 'Gospel' and 'Absorbing Playtime', and hardly any offer as much raw energy. "

Reggie Royston of the St. Paul Pioneer Press called it "a bristling lyrical album" that "captures the earnestness of Twin Cities underground rap".

== Track listing ==
No.	Title	Length
1.	"Intro (We Ain't Goin' Nowhere)"	0:33
2.	"Absorbing Playtime"	4:45
3.	"Reinventing The Wheel"	3:38
4.	"Denizen Kane Spoken Word"	1:16
5.	"Time Flies"	4:34
6.	"Nomi Spoken Word"	3:42
7.	"Sleep Walk"	5:22
8.	"Proof 101"	1:47
9.	"Oscillations At 40 Hz"	5:11
10.	"Any Day"	4:01
11.	"Twenty Cents To The Corner Store"	3:33
12.	"Brick Walls (A Capella)"	2:18
13.	"Gospel"	4:16
14.	"Freestyle Session"	9:03
15.	"Room Mic Goes Out (Bonus Track)"	6:39

== Credits ==
- Design: Lyndon Kennedy, Peter Koechley
- Drums: Peter Leggett
- Flute, Keyboards [Rhodes]: Tasha Baron
- Guitar: Josh Peterson
- Mixed By, Mastered By, Engineer, Producer: DJ Anatomy, DJ Deetalx
- Photography: Anthony Thne
- Producer: DJ Natural
- Producer: Twinkie Jiggles
- Rap: Armando, Carnage, Doug Kearne, Eyedea
- Trumpet: Alex Mcintosh
