= Ford One =

EP by Atmosphere
- Released: September 1, 2000
- Genre: Hip hop
- Length: 23:49
- Label: Rhymesayers Entertainment
- Producer: Jel, Ant, Anomaly, Slug

Atmosphere chronology
Ford One (2000)	Ford Two (2000)

Professional ratings
Review scores
Source	Rating
RapReviews.com	7.5/10

Ford One is an EP by American hip hop group Atmosphere. It was released on Rhymesayers Entertainment in 2000. It is the first installment of the Ford EP series, the second being Ford Two.

== Track listing ==
No.	Title	Producer(s)	Length
1.	"Free or Dead (Ford One)"	Jel	4:47
2.	"Party for the Fight to Write"	Ant	3:54
3.	"They're All Gonna Laugh @ You"	Jel	2:04
4.	"Free or Dub"	Jel, Anomaly	4:52
5.	"Instrumental for the Fight to Write"	Ant	3:54
6.	"Just Tryin' to Make Friends with Your DeeJay"	Slug	0:05
