= Jason Heinrichs =

Canadian musician and producer, also known as Anomaly

Jason William Heinrichs
- Also known as: Anomaly
- Born: December 7, 1970; Kingston, Ontario, Canada
- Died: February 22, 2022 (aged 51) Richfield, Minnesota
- Genres: Electronica, hip-hop, house music
- Occupations: DJ, producer
- Instruments: Bass, drums, programming, keyboards
- Years active: 1994-2022
- Formerly of: Roomsa, Brother Sun Sister Moon, Cenospecies

Jason Heinrichs, also known by his stage name Anomaly (December 7, 1970–February 7, 2022) was a Canadian-born musician and producer from Minneapolis. He worked primarily in dance music and hip-hop, and was notable for producing some of the earliest works by prominent Twin Cities rappers Atmosphere, Eyedea, P.O.S., and Oddjobs, as well as his own work with house-music duo Roomsa and solo efforts. He also played in Brother Sun Sister Moon, a side project of Information Society's Paul Robb.

== Early life ==
Heinrichs was born in Kingston, Ontario, in 1970, to Dr. Richard and Jean Heinrichs; he had a brother, Karl. He graduated near the top of his class from Berklee College of Music in Boston in 1994 with degrees in film scoring and music production, and moved to Minneapolis to further his music career.

== Career ==
Music critic Keith Harris called Heinrichs "an inescapable presence in turn-of-the-millennium (Minnesota) music" who "moved easily between the worlds of dance music, hip-hop, and indie rock." He was proficient on many instruments, including keyboards, bass, saxophone, and guitar, and was a classically trained pianist. He was also a live DJ, performing in Minnesota, Florida, and elsewhere.

He played bass for Brother Sun Sister Moon, a trip-hop group that paired singer-songwriter Barbara Cohen and synth-pop musician Paul Robb of Information Society. The band released one album, 1997's The Great Game, on Robb's Hakatak label.

Under his Anomaly name, Heinrichs released the electronica/hip-hop album Howle's Book in 1998 on Minneapolis label Groove Garden Records. Heinrichs wrote and produced the entire album, which featured vocals from prominent Twin Cities rappers Eyedea and Slug, as well as DJ Abilities of the Rhymesayers collective and Andrew Broder of Fog. Peter Scholtes of City Pages called Howle's Book "a debut album of moody sample-funk and collaborative Twin Town rap". Kate Sullivan of the St. Paul Pioneer Press called the album "a soundtrack for nighttime mischief, a dream cycle" that was not so much "a collection of songs, but a cohesive animal guided by flux and momentum." Anomaly also appeared solo on two songs and as part of the improvisational collaborative supergroup Fresh Squeez on the Groove Garden compilation Varietals Vol. 1. Heinrichs also released a house-music EP, Plato's Revenge, under his own name in 2007.

Heinrichs was the producer/DJ half of the electronica duo Roomsa, along with singer Lady Sarah, and performed most of the music himself. Their music was described as "deep house with a potent funk" by Jen Boyles of City Pages. Ross Raihala of the St. Paul Pioneer Press called Roomsa "dreamy, slick, soulful stuff that's just as likely to unfurl on the dance floor as it is in the chill-out room," and compared them favorably to English electronica band Morcheeba. The duo released one album, 2007's Oceans, and a series of EPs in the mid-2000s, and collaborated with house-music DJs Miguel Migs, Kaskade, and Gene Farris.

In 2001, he formed the hip-hop trio Cenospecies, notable as the first major project featuring future Doomtree co-founder P.O.S. along with rapper Syst. It released one album, 2001's Indefinition, recorded and produced by Heinrichs at his Satori Sound studio. Besides P.O.S., it also featured vocals by Kill the Vultures rapper Crescent Moon. Cenospecies achieved significant local buzz but broke up within a year. The band received the tongue-in-cheek award "Best band to break up in the past 12 months" in City Pages' annual Best of the Twin Cities issue in 2002.

He kept busy as a music producer and engineer, recording many bands in his home studio, known variously as Anomaly's House or Satori Sound. These included the Atmosphere EPs Ford One and Ford Two, later combined as Lucy Ford: The Atmosphere EP's. In an obituary for Heinrichs in 2002, Slug described the recordings: "It was the first time we’d seen anyone use a computer and grid to record and sequence music. He supplied the sound effect of the squealing pig on one of our songs ("Nothing But Sunshine") and we laughed for a long time." Other recordings at the studio included albums by hip-hop bands CMI and Oddjobs, and songs by indie-rock singer Dylan Hicks. He also produced the Slug, Eyedea & Sole collaboration "Savior?" which appeared on the 1999 Anticon compilation Music for the Advancement of Hip Hop.

He also created music for commercials, with his work appearing in ads for Volvo and Saab, among others.

== Death ==
Heinrichs died in his sleep February 7, 2022 at his home in Richfield, Minnesota, at age 51.

== Selected discography ==
=== As primary artist ===
- Brother Sun Sister Moon, The Great Game (1997, Hakatak)
- Jayson Heinrichs & El Segundo Productions, "Sidewalk’s End" and "Done" (from Freeloaded Wednesdays, 1997, Garden Groove Records)
- Anomaly, Howle’s Book (1998, Groove Garden Records)
- Anomaly, "Contaminated" and "Square D" (from Varietals Vol. 1, 2000, Groove Garden Records)
- Fresh Squeez, "Rain Check" and "Dear" (from Varietals Vol. 1, 2000, Groove Garden Records)
- Cenospecies, In Definition (2001, Peak Records)
- Roomsa, Dance All Night EP (2001, Farris Wheel Records)
- Roomsa, Reason Why EP (2002, Farris Wheel Records)
- Roomsa, Tonight EP (2003, Farris Wheel Records)
- Roomsa, Stuff Like That EP (2004, Aphrodisio Recordings)
- Roomsa with Miguel Migs, Tatiana EP (2004, Aphrodisio Recordings)
- Roomsa with Kaskade, This Girl (2004, Aphrodisio Recordings)
- Roomsa, The Sunrise EP (2004, Salted Music)
- Roomsa, Lovin' Me Right (2006, Aphrodisio Recordings)
- Roomsa, Oceans (2007, Aphrodisio Recordings)
- Jason Heinrichs, Plato's Revenge (2007, Revival Recordings)

=== As producer or engineer ===
- CMI, Case Studies (1998)
- Oddjobs, Conflict & Compromise (1999, Interlock Records)
- Slug, Eyedea & Sole, "Savior?" on Music for the Advancement of Hip Hop (1999, Anticon)
- Atmosphere, Ford One and Ford Two EPs (2000, Rhymesayers Entertainment); later combined as Lucy Ford: The Atmosphere EP's
- Syst, Linear Language (2002, Poor Bastard Records)
- Kanser, Happens Everywhere EP (2001, Interlock Records)
- Raw Villa, Rebellion EP (2000, Black Corners)

=== As backing musician ===
- Dylan Hicks, Alive With Pleasure (No Alternative Records, 2001)
- Miraculous, Love & Lies (2006)
