= Dylan Hicks =

American musician and novelist

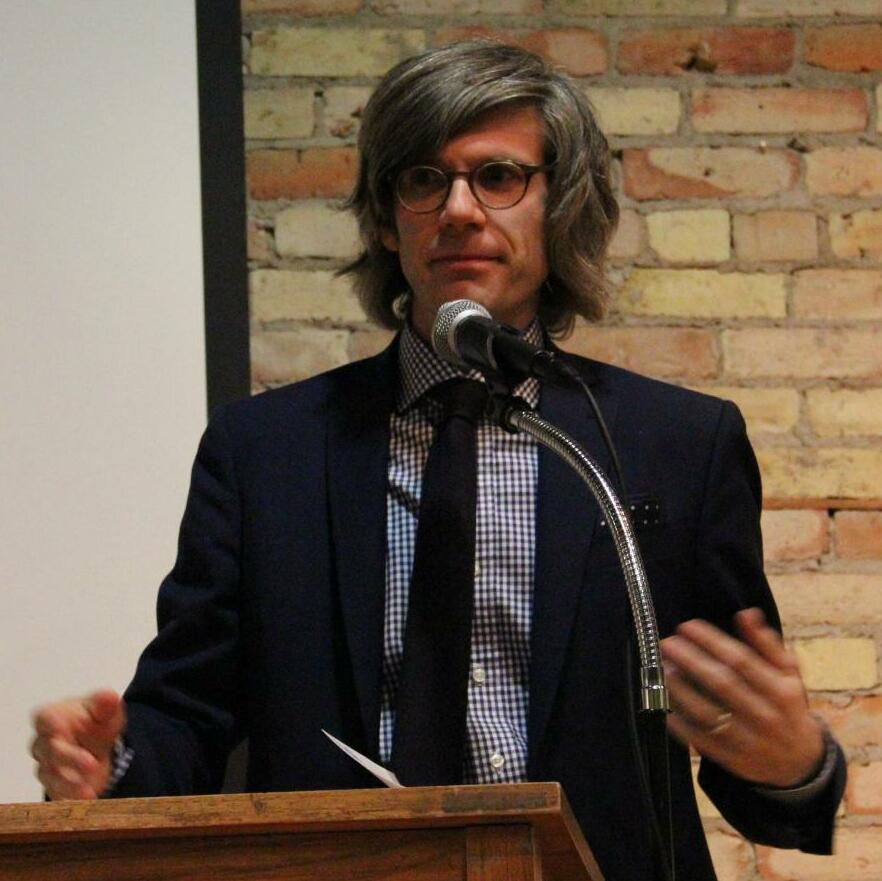
- Hicks in 2012

Background information
- Also known as: Dylan Hicks
- Born: December 11, 1970 (age 55); Austin, Texas
- Origin: Minneapolis
- Occupations: Singer-songwriter; novelist; DJ
- Instruments: Piano, guitar
- Label: Soft Launch
- Website: dylanhicks.com

Dylan Hicks (also sometimes known as the Governor of Fun) is an American singer-songwriter and novelist from Minneapolis, Minnesota.

== Early life ==
Hicks was born in Austin, Texas in 1970. He described his parents in an interview as "definitely members of the counterculture." His parents divorced, and his mother remarried. Hicks grew up in Austin, Minot, North Dakota, Idaho, and Illinois, before his family settled in Minneapolis in 1983. As a teenager, Hicks has said he was "almost single-mindedly interested in music", and wanted to become a pop-music critic.

== Career ==
=== As a musician ===
Hicks' first three albums were released on the No Alternative label. After releasing a self-produced cassette and two 45s, his first album, Won, was released in 1996 and recorded with backing band The Golf Ball-Sized Boogie. He released his second CD, Poughkeepsie, in 1998, which was described by Kristy Martin of the magazine CMJ New Music Report as "a sparkling demo of smart wordplay and pop sensibility."

Hicks followed this up with the album Alive With Pleasure in 2001. The album featured drum and instrument programming on the songs "City Lights" and "My Best Friend" by Jason Heinrichs, also known as Anomaly. Star Tribune music critic Chris Riemenschneider named the album No. 8 in his top 10 Minnesota records of 2001, calling it "full of self-deprecating, oddball characters and one telling, ironic tale after another".

Hicks became frustrated when his musical career failed to achieve financial stability, and quit playing music entirely for several years.

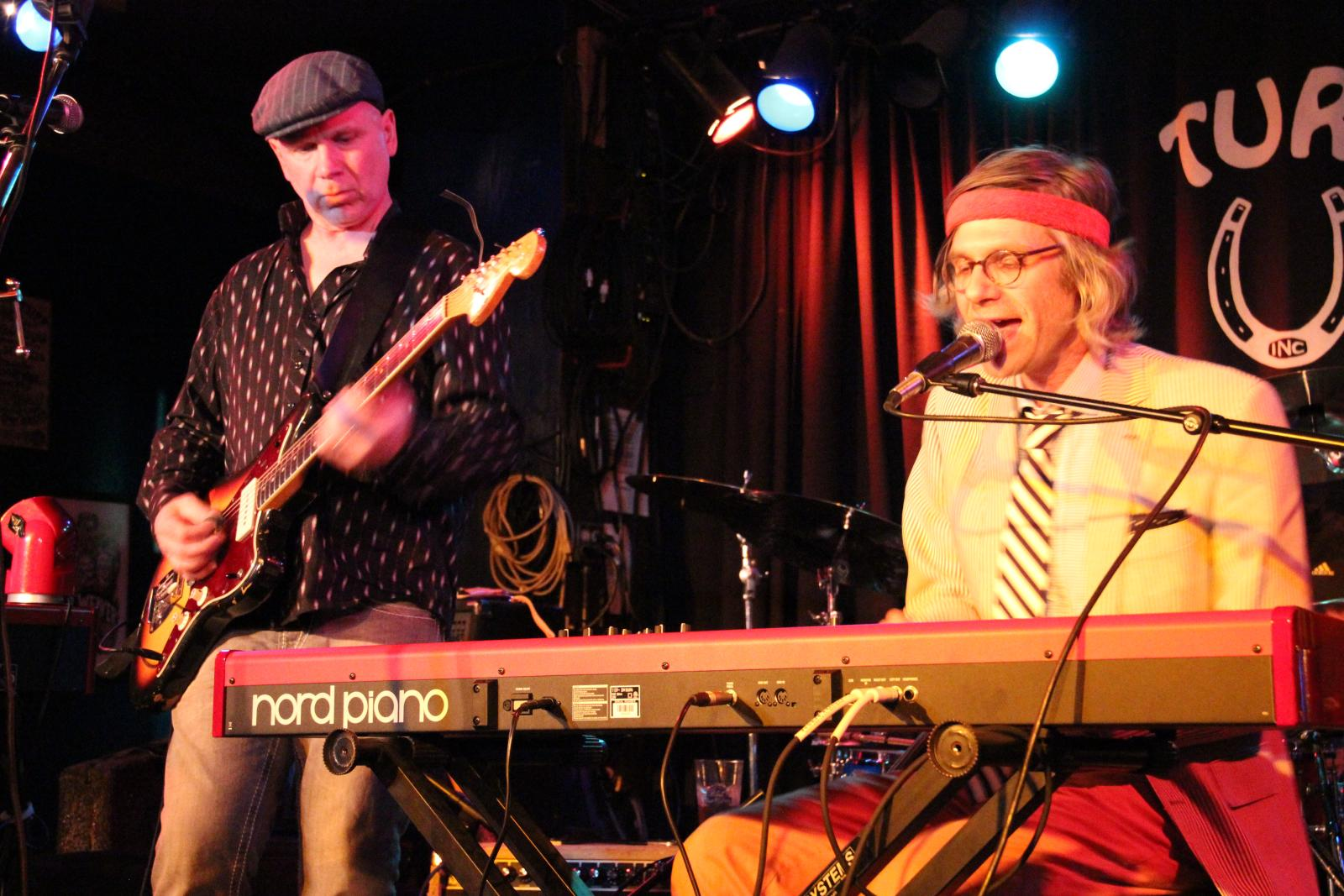
Hicks (right) performs at the Turf Club in St. Paul, Minnesota, in 2012

Hicks returned to music in 2012, when, as a companion to his novel Boarded Windows, he released the album Sings Bolling Greene, featuring songs he wrote in the persona of Bolling Greene, one of the characters in the book. In the book, Greene is a country musician. About half of the songs on Sings Bolling Greene are written from Greene's perspective, while the remaining ones are about Greene. He told one interviewer that “when I no longer had to worry about making a living at it, I went back to making music for the fun of it.”

In 2017, Hicks released the solo album Ad Out. It was produced by Semisonic bassic John Munson. A reviewer for Paste called its lead single, "A-24", "dark yet colorful, wicked but playful."

In 2020, he teamed up again with Munson in the duo Munson-Hicks Party Supplies. Originally intending to write a musical together, their collaboration turned instead for inspiration to the 1970 album Nilsson Sings Newman by Randy Newman and Harry Nilsson. The duo's debut, the self-titled Munson-Hicks Party Supplies, was released in 2020. Star Tribune music critic Chris Riemenschneider called it "one of the most charming albums of the year".

Hicks has also released three albums with backing band Small Screens: 2021's Accidental Birds, 2022's Airport Sparrows, and 2024's Modern Flora. Modern Flora was positively received by critics. Neil Duggan of the website All About Jazz gave the album four of five stars, calling it "a fascinating and engaging listen" and writing that "the album is all the better for being unconventional. Hicks' lyrics have a pleasing mix of the emotionally direct and obscure observational that pique your curiosity." Keith Harris of the website Racket placed Modern Flora at No. 4 on his list of the best 2024 albums by Minnesota artists, saying that although "the arrangements can be quite elaborate and the solos ingenious, the melodies are often straightforward, as largely improvisational musicians adapt their chops to a pop context without significantly simplifying their styles." Reviewing the song "The Unicellular Spore", Mpls.St.Paul Magazine wrote that "Hicks is a genius at crafting astute lyrics that bend the mind and expand the reality in front of you."

=== As a novelist ===
In 2012, Hicks' debut novel, Boarded Windows, was published by Coffee House Press. It is narrated by a nameless narrator, and is set in Minneapolis in the 1990s. Courtney Algo and Lit Lyfe wrote in the Twin Cities Daily Planet that "fans of Hicks and rapier-sharp prose will find a great delight in Boarded Windows." A review in MinnPost described the book as "a vivid time capsule of those scruffier days of [1990s] Twin Cities music fandom."

A second novel, Amateurs, was published in May 2016 by Coffee House Press. The story revolves around a group of friends at the wedding of Archer Bondarenko, heir to a sex-toy company who is also a successful novelist (but whose friend Sara actually ghostwrites the books). New York Times reviewer Courtney Maum said that Hick was "winningly deft with language" but felt that the novel's themes were unclear. Los Angeles Times reviewer Michael Schaub called the book "meandering ... in the best possible way" and said that Hicks' attention to the evolution of his characters over time was "near-perfect." Kenyon Review's Michael Magras called the book "witty and perceptive" and "a droll commentary about ambition among the would-be literati."

Hicks is working on a third novel.

He has also written for City Pages.

== Works ==
=== Bibliography ===
- Boarded Windows (Coffee House Press, 2012)
- Amateurs (Coffee House Press, 2016)

Modern Flora
Review scores
Source	Rating
All About Jazz	4/5 stars

=== Discography ===
- The New Dylan (self-released cassette, 1990)
- "Chump Remover" (7" EP, Prospective Records, 1992)
- "Time Capsule" (7" single, Prospective Records, 1994)
- Vision Web (as "Dylan Davis", self-released cassette, 1997)
- Won (with The Golf Ball-Sized Boogie, No Alternative Records, 1996)
- Poughkeepsie (No Alternative Records, 1998)
- Alive With Pleasure (No Alternative Records, 2001)
- Sings Bolling Greene (Two Deuces, 2012)
- Ad Out (Soft Launch Records, 2017)
- Munson-Hicks Party Supplies (with John Munson, Soft Launch Records, 2020)
- Accidental Birds (with Small Screens, Soft Launch Records, 2021)
- Airport Sparrows (with Small Screens, Soft Launch Records, 2022)
- "The Weather on Your Side" (12" single, Soft Launch Records, 2023)
- Modern Flora (with Small Screens, Soft Launch Records, 2024)
- Avian Field Recordings (with Small Screens, Soft Launch Records, 2025)
