= Kim Bartmann =

Restaurateur

Kim Bartmann is a Minneapolis based restaurateur. She has been named a semifinalist for the James Beard Award three times.

== Biography ==
Bartmann grew up in Appleton, Wisconsin and attended the University of Minnesota in the 1980s. She worked a series of kitchen jobs around the area before starting Cafe Wyrd, a coffee shop, in 1991.

She is married to Sarah Jane Wroblewski and they have two children.

== Restaurants ==
Bartmann is the owner of Placemaker Hospitality and operates eight restaurants in Minneapolis. Her restaurants use sustainably and locally grown food as much as possible. The Red Stag Supperclub was the first LEED certified restaurant in Minnesota and Tiny Diner has its own permaculture farm and solar array.

Bartmann was the owner of Bryant-Lake Bowl from 1993 to 2018.

=== James Beard Award ===
Bartmann was named semifinalist for the James Beard Foundation Award for Outstanding Restaurateur in 2013, 2015, and 2022.

In 2021, her ownership company, The Bartmann Group, had reached a settlement with her employees for $230,000 to cover back and overtime wages after allegedly laying them off during the COVID-19 pandemic shutdowns without a final paycheck. After her 2022 nomination was announced, people took to social media saying that the company had violated the James Beard Foundation code of ethics which lists "stealing of wages or tips". Pete Wells of The New York Times argued on Twitter that there was no admission of wrongdoing and since these types of cases are so common, if the James Beard Foundation took these into account, they would be making decisions based on accusations and not legal determinations of guilt.
