= Ford Two =

EP by Atmosphere
- Released: September 1, 2000
- Genre: Hip hop
- Length: 26:43
- Label: Rhymesayers Entertainment
- Producer: Jel, Ant, Moodswing9

Atmosphere chronology
| Ford One (2000) | Ford Two (2000) |

Professional ratings
Review scores
| Source | Rating |
|---|---|
| RapReviews.com | 7.5/10 |

Ford Two is an EP by American hip hop group Atmosphere. It was released on Rhymesayers Entertainment in 2000. It is the second installment of the Ford EP series, the first being Ford One. The two were later collected on the 2001 compilation Lucy Ford: The Atmosphere EP's.

Some of the sessions were produced at the home studio of Jason Heinrichs, also known as Anomaly. In an obituary for Heinrichs in 2002, Slug described the recordings: "It was the first time we’d seen anyone use a computer and grid to record and sequence music. He supplied the sound effect of the squealing pig on one of our songs ("Nothing But Sunshine") and we laughed for a long time."

== Track listing ==
| No. | Title | Producer(s) | Length |
|---|---|---|---|
| 1. | "Lost and Found (Ford Two)" | Jel | 4:38 |
| 2. | "The Woman with the Tattooed Hands" | Ant | 3:31 |
| 3. | "Nothing but Sunshine" | Moodswing9 | 5:10 |
| 4. | "Travel" | Ant | 5:08 |
| 5. | "Tattooed Instrumental" | Ant | 3:31 |
| 6. | "Nothing but Beats" | Moodswing9 | 5:10 |
| 7. | "Travelling Music" | Ant | 2:04 |
