= First Born (Eyedea & Abilities album) =

Studio album by Eyedea & Abilities
- Released: October 1, 2001
- Genre: Hip-hop
- Length: 70:10
- Label: Rhymesayers Entertainment
- Producer: DJ Abilities

Eyedea & Abilities chronology
The Whereabouts of Hidden Bridges (1999)	First Born (2001)	E&A (2004)

Singles from First Born
- 1. "Blindly Firing" Released: 2001

First Born is the first studio album by American hip-hop duo Eyedea & Abilities. It was released on Rhymesayers Entertainment on October 1, 2001.

== Critical reception ==
Professional ratings
Review scores
Source	Rating
The A.V. Club	favorable
Exclaim!	mixed
Pitchfork	7.9/10

Nathan Rabin of The A.V. Club said, "The album's high-minded excursions into the realm of being and nothingness periodically lurch into navel-gazing self-parody, but Eyedea's passionate delivery and lyrical skills keep the disc grounded." Brad Haywood of Pitchfork gave the album a 7.9 out of 10, stating that "[Eyedea's] rhymes are dense, literate, focused, often surprising and always amusing."

In 2015, HipHopDX included it on the "30 Best Underground Hip Hop Albums Since 2000" list.

== Track listing ==
No.	Title	Length
1.	"One"	2:35
2.	"Music Music"	4:40
3.	"Birth of a Fish..."	2:09
4.	"...Powdered Water Too (Part 1)"	3:03
5.	"...Powdered Water Too (Part 2)"	3:23
6.	"Color My World Mine"	5:57
7.	"Liquid Sovereignty"	5:30
8.	"A Murder of Memories"	4:58
9.	"Blindly Firing"	3:46
10.	"Big Shots"	3:50
11.	"Void (Internal Theory)"	2:14
12.	"The Dive (Part 1)"	4:13
13.	"The Dive (Part 2)"	5:13
14.	"Well Being"	3:09
15.	"Read Wiped in Blue"	5:08
16.	"Void (External Theory)"	1:14
17.	"On This I Stand"	5:28
18.	"Before and After" (bonus track; featuring Blueprint)	3:40
Total length:		70:10

== Personnel ==
Credits adapted from liner notes.

- Eyedea – vocals, lyrics
- DJ Abilities – production
- Chris Blood – recording, mixing, mastering
- Emily Lazar – mastering
- M. Ward – artwork, design
- Stress – layout
