= Ecid =

American rapper

- Born: Jason David McKenzie
- Origin: Saint Paul, Minnesota
- Genres: Hip hop, alternative hip hop
- Occupations: Rapper, producer
- Years active: 2004-present
- Labels: Fill In The Breaks; Fake Four Inc.
- Website: ecidlovesyou.com

Jason David McKenzie, better known by his stage name Ecid (often stylized as ECID or eCid), is an American hip hop recording artist and record producer from Saint Paul, Minnesota, who is currently based in Portland, Oregon. He has collaborated and shared stages with Louis Logic, Eyedea and Milo, among others. Ecid is currently signed to Fill In The Breaks.

== Musical career ==
Ecid first gained attention in the Twin Cities hip hop scene with his 2006 album Biograffiti. Through playing shows and meeting other hip hop artists, he was introduced to the late Eyedea, a notable figure that would collaborate with Ecid, through fellow St. Paul rapper Kristoff Krane.

Alongside rapper Awol One, he released the 2010 project named Awol One And Ecid Are... on Fake Four Inc.

In 2012, Ecid released his self produced album Werewolf Hologram. It was received generally well amongst critics, with Steven Spoerl of PopMatters saying "The twin cities indie hip-hop scene is exploding right now and Werewolf Hologram is the most recent piece of its intricate puzzle." The album also reached #22 on CMJ hip hop charts, just above P.O.S and A$AP Rocky

The next year, he released two EP's named Post Euphoria Vol. 1 and Post Euphoria Vol. 2.

In 2015, he released the album Pheromone Heavy, which featured Louis Logic.

== Discography ==
Studio albums

- Stance - Sub Abusive (2002)
- Nineteen80Three (2004)
- Biograffiti (2006)
- Economy Size goDD Costume (2007)
- Red Beretta (2009)
- 100 Smiles And Runnin' (2010)
- Werewolf Hologram (2012)
- Pheromone Heavy (2015)
- HowToFakeYourOwnDeath (2017)

Collaborative albums

- Awol One And Ecid Are... (2010) (with Awol One)

EPs

- Post Euphoria Vol. 1 (2013)
- Post Euphoria Vol. 2 (2013)

Singles

- Awol One And Ecid - "Tomorrows Astronaut" (2011)
