= Conflict & Compromise =

1999 album by Oddjobs

Studio album by Oddjobs
- Released: 1999
- Studio: Satori Sound
- Genre: Alternative hip hop
- Label: Interlock Records

Oddjobs chronology
Conflict & Compromise (1999)	The Whereabouts of Hidden Bridges (1999)

Conflict & Compromise is the debut album by Minnesota alternative hip hop group Oddjobs. It was released in 1999 by Interlock Records.

== History ==
The Oddjobs quintet began as a collaboration between students from Minneapolis South and St. Paul Central high schools around 1995. Oddjobs was itself a splinter group of a larger 30-member collective called Cases Of Mistaken Identity, or CMI, which also included graffiti artists and break dancers. The same scene produced other rap acts such as Kanser and Heiruspecs. The CMI collective put out a cassette, Case Studies, in 1998, but soon only the core group of five remained. "Oddjobs was basically everyone who was serious enough to want to continue music after high school," Casselle told the French website Hiphopcore.

Oddjobs’ 1999 debut album, Conflict & Compromise, was recorded when the band members were around 15 years old. It was recorded at the home studio of Jason Heinrichs, also known as Anomaly, who had also recorded the earlier CMI record. About 1,000 copies of the album were made. Slug, rapper for the prominent Minneapolis rap duo Atmosphere, provides guest vocals on the song "Hunger Pains II." It was released on Interlock Records, a collaborative effort by several groups in the Twin Cities rap scene of the late 1990s and early 2000s, including Heiruspecs, Kanser, and CMI.

Looking back on the album 10 years later, both Anatomy (Stephen Lewis) and Crescent Moon (Alexei Casselle) viewed it as a stepping stone to later, better work. "It was just a necessary trial and error. It's all about trying to figure out what kind of music you're trying to make, what your contribution will be," said Casselle. Anatomy was blunter: "It's very immature; it's pretty bad I think."

== Track listing ==
No.	Title	Length
1.	"Emphasis On Conflict"
2.	"Scary Mary To The Grass Man"
3.	"Hunger Pains II" (Guitar: Alex Macintosh. Guest MCs: Carnage, New, Slug)
4.	"Head In The Clouds" (Tambourine: Graham O'Brien)
5.	"Back At The Ranch"
6.	"Trap Doors" (Bass: Sean McPherson. Beatbox: Booka B)
7.	"Evening" (Guitar: Alex Macintosh)
8.	"Contrast" (Bass: Sean McPherson)
9.	"No Egos" (Producer: Booka B)
10.	"All My Friends" (Bass: Casey O'Brien. Drums: Graham O'Brien)
11.	"The Breaks"
12.	"Reconciliation" (Congas: Booka B)
13.	"Great Minds"
14.	"Exception To The Rule"
15.	"Double Negative" (Congas: Booka B)

== Credits ==
- Mixed and mastered by Jason Heinrichs
- Scratches: Anatomy, Deetalx
- Written by: A. Waytz (tracks 1–6, 8–15), A. Casselle (tracks 1–9, 11–15), D. Callahan (tracks 4, 6, 11–13, 15), G. O'Brien (tracks 1–3, 5, 7, 8, 14), S. Lewis (tracks 1–5, 7, 8, 10–15)
