= The Many Faces of Oliver Hart =

Studio album by Oliver Hart
- Released: July 1, 2002
- Genre: Hip hop, alternative hip hop, underground hip hop, psychedelic hip hop
- Length: 73:12
- Label: Rhymesayers Entertainment
- Producer: Oliver Hart

The Many Faces of Oliver Hart or: How Eye One the Write Too Think is the debut solo studio album by Eyedea, released under the pseudonym Oliver Hart. It was released on Rhymesayers Entertainment in 2002. In 2014, a vinyl edition of the album was released as a Record Store Day exclusive. The Village Voice included it on the "10 Must-Have Record Store Day Releases" list.

In 2011, Complex placed "Bottle Dreams" at number 11 on the "25 Best Rhymesayers Songs" list. In 2015, City Pages placed "Forget Me" at number 4 on the "Slug's 10 Best Deep Cuts" list.

== Track listing ==
No.	Title	Length
1.	"The Many Faces of Oliver Hart"	2:27
2.	"Weird Side"	3:13
3.	"Song About a Song"	1:37
4.	"How Much Do You Pay?"	5:54
5.	"On a Clear Day"	3:38
6.	"Walking"	4:00
7.	"Step by Step"	3:04
8.	"Prelude to Coaches"	3:46
9.	"Coaches" (featuring Carnage)	4:03
10.	"Bottle Dreams"	3:53
11.	"Soundtrack of a Romance"	5:21
12.	"Just a Reminder"	3:22
13.	"Infrared Roses"	2:14
14.	"My Day at the Brain Factory"	1:54
15.	"Ode to the Wall"	1:32
16.	"Here for You"	7:17
17.	"Motormouth's Anonymous"	3:55
18.	"Forget Me" (featuring Slug)	4:10
19.	"How Eye One the Write Too Think"	7:52
