= Kristoff Krane =

American rapper

- Born: Christopher M. Keller; November 2, 1983 (age 42)
- Origin: Saint Paul, Minnesota, United States
- Genres: Rap
- Occupations: Rapper, producer
- Years active: 2005-present
- Label: F I X

== About ==
Kristoff Krane is a rapper from Minneapolis, MN known for his stream-of-consciousness approach to writing, freestyling, and performing. In addition to his solo releases, Krane was also frontman alongside Eyedea (of Eyedea & Abilities) in Rhymesayers Entertainment's freestyle group, Face Candy. His newest project, Kairos, is a two-part album with music by Graham O'Brien released via indie record label, F I X.

"A journey through something both recklessly spontaneous but wholly balanced […] with its depth and thought-provoking messages strewn about with quick free writes and playful parables to bridge […] a must for the indie set and conscious hoppers".

- URB Magazine

"what might be the greatest treasure is the man’s impressive exhibition of flow, his various speeds and cadences, and voice stretching. Technically, he’s challenged his vocal abilities more so here than ever before, as his fluid and seamless yet excitingly articulated delivery is put to exquisite use, in a variety of modes.”

- Swurv

"The whole project feels like it was created in a purgatorial state between our world & some higher dimension. Some of the purest art rap out there .”

- Amoeba Music

== Discography ==
=== Studio albums ===
- This Will Work for Now (2008)
- Hunting for Father (2010)
- Picking Flowers Next to Roadkill (2010)
- Fanfaronade (2012)
- I Freestyle Life (2005-2013) (2014)
- Moon Goddess (2015) (as Kadoka)
- Kairos, Part 1 (2017)
- Kairos, Part 2 (2018)

=== Collaborative projects ===
Albums

- Abzorbr - Capable of Teetering (2005)
- Face Candy - This is Where We Were (2006, Rhymesayers Entertainment)
- Face Candy - Waste Age Teenland (2011, Rhymesayers Entertainment)
- Prey for Paralysis - Prey for Paralysis (2011) with (Sadistik and Graham O'Brien)

EPs

- Abzorbr - EP1 (2005)
- Abzorbr - See-Through Eyes (2006) split w/ Carbon Carousel
- Abzorbr - EP2 (2007)
- Abzorbr - EP3 (2009)

Non-album singles

- F I X (2012) with F to I to X
- Flash Flood (2014) with F to I to X
- Firewalking (2014) with F to I to X
- Out of Line (2015)

Guest appearances

- Sadistik - "Water" from Altars (2017)
- Illogic & Blockhead - "Lighthouse" from Capture the Sun (2013)
- Mixed Blood Majority - "Ritual" from Mixed Blood Majority (2013)
- No Bird Sing - "Target Practice" from Definition Sickness (2012)
- Graham O'Brien - "Recyclemaker" and "Query" from Live Drums (2010)
- No Bird Sing - “Sparrows" from No Bird Sing (2009)
