= Eyedea & Abilities =

American hip-hop group

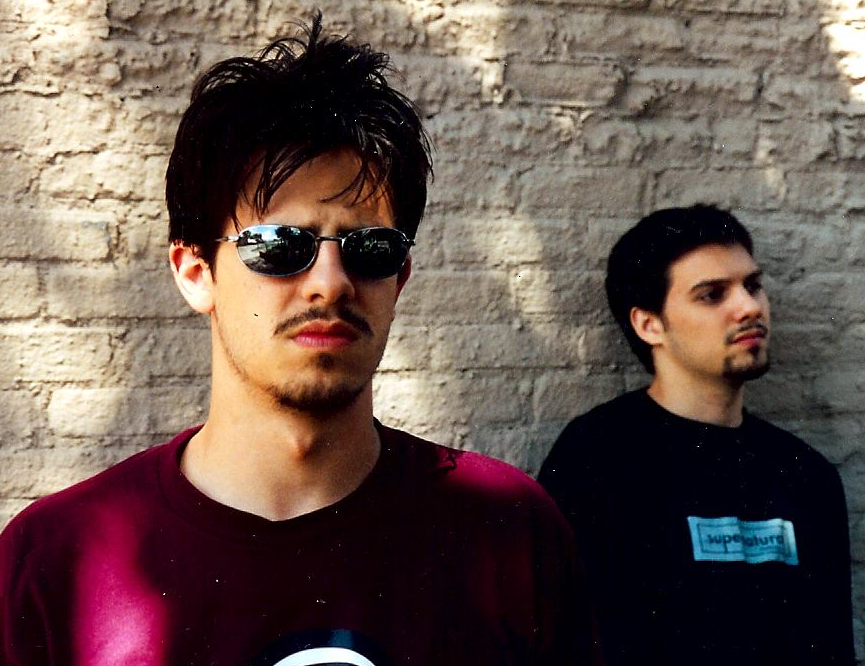
- Eyedea with DJ Abilities.

Background information
- Also known as: E&A, Sixth Sense
- Origin: Saint Paul, Minnesota, United States
- Genres: Hip-hop, alternative hip-hop, rap rock, underground hip-hop, psychedelic hip-hop
- Years active: 1999–2010
- Labels: Rhymesayers, Epitaph, Crushkill Recordings
- Members: DJ Abilities; Eyedea (deceased)
- Website: myspace.com/eyedeaandabilities

Eyedea & Abilities (often abbreviated as E&A) was an American hip-hop duo from Saint Paul, Minnesota, consisting of rapper Eyedea and DJ Abilities. The duo was founded in 1999 and became a prominent figure of the underground hip-hop scene, becoming known for Eyedea's philosophical and socially conscious lyrics, along with DJ Abilities' dynamic experimental fusion of stylistic elements from both rap and rock, as well as electronic music. The group was active until Eyedea's death in October 2010.

Over the course of just over a decade, the duo had collaborated with many well-known hip-hop groups and artists such as Aesop Rock and Sage Francis, playing a prominent role in the emerging underground rap movement. Eyedea's background work in rap battles, along with his introspective, complex, and poetic sense of lyrical integrity, heavily influenced E&A's distinctive musical output and largely defined the group as a unique and stylistically independent presence within alternative hip-hop.

== Early beginnings ==
Eyedea first became known around the local Midwest hip-hop circuit for his battling and freestyle skills. Eyedea was best known for his victory at the Blaze Battle, which was aired on HBO and hosted by KRS-One. Afterwards, Eyedea went on to tour as Atmosphere with Slug and other Rhymesayers crew. DJ Abilities was known for winning two DMC awards and for his work on his mixtapes and 1200 Hobos.

== Musical career ==
Eyedea & Abilities made their jump from the battle scene with the release of their debut album First Born.

Following a solo effort by Eyedea in 2002 under the name Oliver Hart, Eyedea and Abilities released E&A in 2004, which returned Eyedea back to his battle rapper roots, with Vish Khanna from Exclaim! giving it a favorable review, saying: "Eyedea is a pesky braggadocio, spitting out disses like a mouthy schoolyard bully cracking his crew up at your expense."

Following E&A, the duo went on an unannounced hiatus, bringing speculation that Eyedea & Abilities were no longer together. However, in August 2007, the duo announced via their MySpace that they would be at the Twin Cities Celebration of Hip Hop performing old songs, as well as new material.

Eyedea & Abilities returned to the road in the Winter of 2007 with their 'Appetite For Distraction Tour'. Accompanied by fellow Minnesota artists Kristoff Krane and Sector7G, the tour was mainly on the west coast until the Spring of 2008 when the duo brought the 'Appetite For Distraction Tour' to listeners in east coast cities. The tour has garnered excitement from fans, as E&A had taken a four-year hiatus, and the duo's next album was one of the most anticipated among the independent hip-hop scene. The album By the Throat was released through Rhymesayers Entertainment on July 21, 2009.

In 2007, Eyedea created a book of poetry and art with painter Louis N. LaPierre, who is also responsible for Face Candy's 'This Is Where We Were' album art. The book was titled 'Once A Queen... Always A Creep'. Only 80 copies were made. It was on sale during Eyedea & Abilities 'Appetite For Distraction' Tour.

On October 16, 2010, Micheal Larsen's mother found him dead in his home as a result of an opiate toxicity. Ramsey County officials ruled the opiate overdose accidental.

== Legacy ==
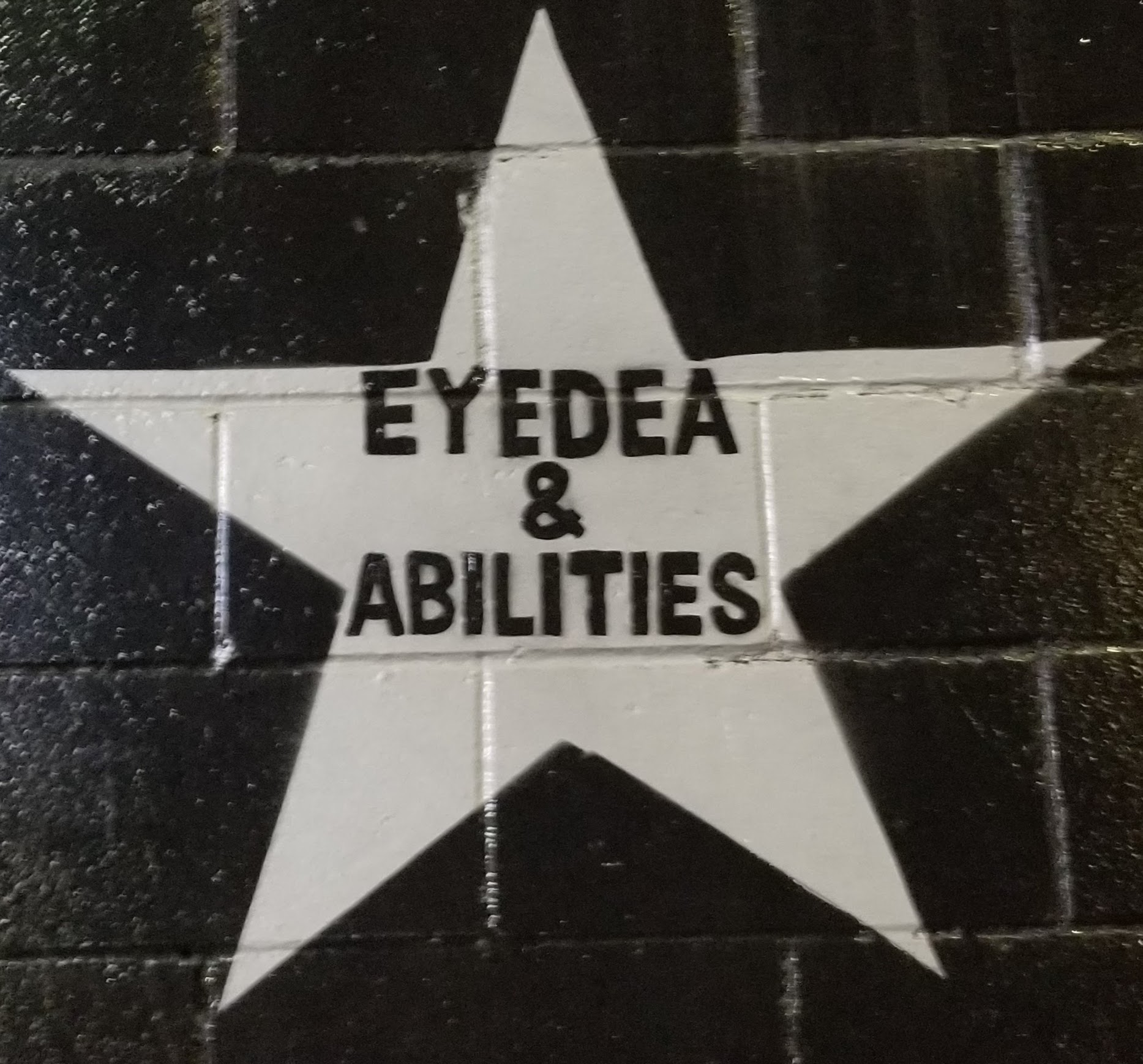
Eyedea & Abilities' star on the outside mural of the Minneapolis nightclub First Avenue

Eyedea & Abilities has been honored with a star on the outside mural of the Minneapolis nightclub First Avenue, recognizing performers that have played sold-out shows or have otherwise demonstrated a major contribution to the culture at the iconic venue. Receiving a star "might be the most prestigious public honor an artist can receive in Minneapolis," according to journalist Steve Marsh.

== Discography ==
=== Albums ===
- First Born (2001)
- E&A (2004)
- By the Throat (2009)
- Grand's Sixth Sense (2011) (as Sixth Sense, recorded in the 1990s, posthumous release)

=== Singles ===
- Pushing Buttons 12" (2000)
- Blindly Firing 12" (2001)
- Now 12" (2003)

=== Other ===
- E&A Road Mix (2003)
- E&A Instrumentals (2003)
- When in Rome, Kill the King (2010)
- Eyedea: Freestyles (2010)
