= Eyedea =

American rapper (1981–2010)

Background information
- Also known as: Eyedea; Oliver Hart
- Born: Micheal David Larsen; November 9, 1981
- Origin: Saint Paul, Minnesota, U.S.
- Died: October 16, 2010 (aged 28) Saint Paul, Minnesota, U.S.
- Genres: Hip hop, alternative hip hop, rap rock, underground hip hop, psychedelic hip hop
- Occupation: Rapper
- Years active: 1997–2010
- Labels: Rhymesayers Entertainment; Crushkill Recordings
- Website: MichealLarsen.com

Micheal David Larsen (November 9, 1981 – October 16, 2010), better known by his stage name Eyedea, was an American rapper. He was a freestyle battle champion and songwriter from Saint Paul, Minnesota.

Larsen had appeared as a solo artist under the pseudonym Oliver Hart, and as the MC half of the duo Eyedea & Abilities (along with longtime friend and collaborator DJ Abilities). He was first signed to Slug's independent hip-hop label Rhymesayers Entertainment before founding his own record label, Crushkill Recordings.

== Career ==
Eyedea first stepped into the hip-hop scene battling against other emcees at notable freestyle competitions. Notable wins included a victory at Scribble Jam (1999) and the televised Blaze Battle sponsored by HBO (2000), which was hosted by KRS-One. Following the win, he won an impressive portion of money, but was also offered a higher cut if he signed a record contract with hip hop mogul P. Diddy, to which he declined, instead helping build Rhymesayers Entertainment from the ground up.

Notable hip-hop outlets have labeled Eyedea as a freestyle pioneer. Eyedea has released numerous albums alongside DJ Abilities where the two performed under the duo name "Eyedea & Abilities". In 2001, Eyedea & Abilities released their debut studio album First Born, which included their successful single "Big Shots".

The single was later chosen to appear on Tony Hawk's Pro Skater 4. In 2004, Eyedea & Abilities released their second studio album titled E&A, which included the singles "Paradise" & "Man vs Ape". In July 2009, Eyedea & Abilities released their third and final studio album called By the Throat, which was followed by highly acclaimed positive ratings. In 2014, Eyedea ranked #2 on Abbey Magazine's Top 25 'greatest freestyle emcees of all-time'.

== Early life ==
Eyedea grew up near Saint Paul, Minnesota, with his mother Kathy Averill, who gave birth to him when she was seventeen years old. He is of Irish and Lebanese descent. He attended Highland Park Senior High School.

Eyedea became known as a battle MC, touring the circuit between 1997 and 2001. During this time, he won top prizes at Scribble Jam '99, the Rock Steady Anniversary 2000, and Blaze Battle New York 2000. These battles included him beating notable artists such as Immortal Technique, P.E.A.C.E and PackFM. In 1999, he made his first national appearance on the Anticon compilation, Music for the Advancement of Hip Hop. He also toured extensively as second MC and support DJ for Atmosphere.

In 2001, he released First Born with his partner DJ Abilities (collectively, they were initially called the Sixth Sense, but later changed the name to Eyedea & Abilities). In 2002, under his pen name "Oliver Hart", he released the self-produced The Many Faces of Oliver Hart, or: How Eye One the Write Too Think. In 2004, he reunited with Abilities to release the self-titled album E&A.

All of Eyedea's releases have been on the Rhymesayers record label, with the exception of the Carbon Carousel EP, which was released on his own Independent music label, Crushkill Recordings. In addition to touring independently and with Rhymesayers labelmates and members of Face Candy, Eyedea & Abilities participated in the Def Jux-sponsored "Who Killed the Robots?" tour, titled by Eyedea.

== Music career ==
He was signed to Rhymesayers Entertainment and collaborated with Slug of the underground hip hop group Atmosphere as well as Sage Francis, Aesop Rock, and Blueprint. He was also a member of the hip hop collective and super group "The Orphanage" along with Slug, Aesop Rock, Blueprint, & Illogic. Although never releasing a full CD to the public, songs were recorded and released.

After Eyedea released This Is Where We Were, recorded with his live freestyle rap/jazz group Face Candy, he created Carbon Carousel, an alternative rock band. They have released one EP, entitled The Some of All Things, or: The Healing Power of Scab Picking. This brought on speculation that Eyedea & Abilities were no longer together. However, in August 2007, the duo announced on their Myspace that they would be at the Twin Cities Celebration of Hip-Hop performing old songs and new material. In December 2007, Eyedea & Abilities embarked upon their Appetite for Distraction Tour with Crushkill labelmate Kristoff Krane and Minnesotan duo Sector7G.

In 2007, Eyedea created a book of poetry and art with painter Louis N. LaPierre, who is also responsible for Face Candy's 'This Is Where We Were' album art. The book was titled Once A Queen... Always A Creep. Only 80 copies were made.

The summer of 2009 saw Eyedea & Abilities joining the touring hip hop festival Rock the Bells for a limited number of dates, performing alongside such acts as Sage Francis, Evidence, M.O.P. and the Knux. E&A also performed at the first Rock the Bells concert in 2004, infamous for being Ol' Dirty Bastard's last performance with the Wu-Tang Clan.

In 2011, an EP of 4 of Eyedea's freestyles, previously released in 2010 but only sold at live shows, were made available for 'pay what you want' download. Guitar Party a group consisting of vocalist (and first grader) Mijah Ylvisaker, drummer J.T. Bates (Face Candy, Carbon Carousel, The Pines) and guitarists Jeremy Ylvisaker (Carbon Carousel, Alpha Consumer, Andrew Bird, The Cloak Ox), Jake Hanson (Halloween, Alaska), Andrew Broder (Fog, The Cloak Ox) and Micheal Larsen (Eyedea & Abilities, Carbon Carousel, Face Candy) released a recording of the only live show they had managed to play before Eyedea's death called 'Birthday [I feel Triangular]' . The second Face Candy album was released on May 24, 2011, on Rhymesayers. This album was recorded in two days at the Winterland studios and one night in front of an audience at St. Paul's Black Dog Cafe.

== Style and influences ==
Eyedea is widely known and praised for his battle rap skills. LA Weekly listed his 1999 Scribble Jam battle with P.E.A.C.E from Freestyle Fellowship as one of the greatest rap battles of all time. Despite the aggressive nature of MC battling, his music is often described as thoughtful and philosophical, yet it still provides a live aesthetic.

== Death ==
Eyedea died in his sleep on October 16, 2010, in his Saint Paul apartment. He was found dead by his mother, according to a friend. Cause of death was released November 18, 2010, and ruled an accident, from respiratory depression, caused by opiate derivatives, according to the Ramsey County Medical Examiner's Office. The specific drugs found in Larsen's system have not been revealed to the public.

Various hip-hop artists went on their Twitter accounts to pay their tribute to him, such as Immortal Technique, Mac Lethal, El-P and P.O.S, among others.

== Legacy ==
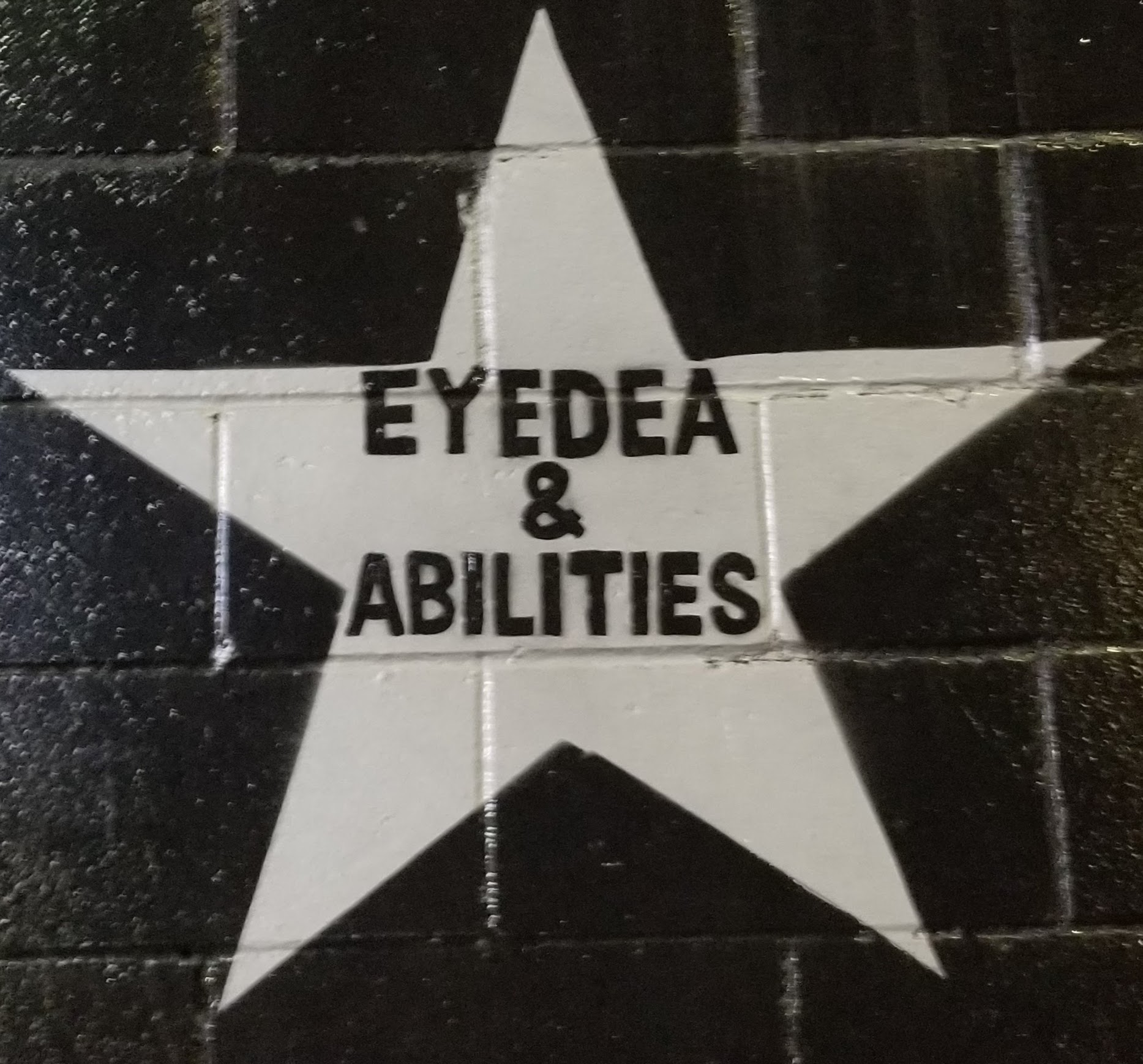
Eyedea & Abilities' star on the outside mural of the Minneapolis nightclub First Avenue

Eyedea & Abilities has been honored with a star on the outside mural of the Minneapolis nightclub First Avenue, recognizing performers that have played sold-out shows or have otherwise demonstrated a major contribution to the culture at the iconic venue. Receiving a star "might be the most prestigious public honor an artist can receive in Minneapolis," according to journalist Steve Marsh.

On December 25, 2013, it was announced on Eyedea & Abilities' Facebook page that a star was registered under the name Eyedea to commemorate Larsen on the web site Online Star Register.

Fellow hip-hop artist and friend Murs paid homage to Eyedea on his track "I Miss Mikey" on his album Have a Nice Life. Also, the song "Flicker" from the album Southsiders by Atmosphere where Slug describes different sides of Eyedea and their relationship can be called a eulogy. In 2013, The Uncluded, a collaboration between folk punk singer Kimya Dawson and hip hop artist Aesop Rock paid tribute to Eyedea in the song "Bats" from their album Hokey Fright. Additionally, the songs "Micheal" from the album Flowers for My Father by Sadistik, "Toast to the Dead" from the album The Martyr by Immortal Technique, and "Great Eyedeas Never Die", from the album King No Crown by Blueprint, are also tributes to Eyedea.

== Discography ==
=== Studio albums ===
- The Many Faces of Oliver Hart, or: How Eye One the Write Too Think (2002) (as Oliver Hart)
- The Many Faces of Mikey (2015) (posthumous release)
- The Orphanage (2021) (fan-made release)
- Thirty Nine Lines (2020) (posthumous release)
- 15-Year Old Shit Talking (2026) (posthumous release)

=== EPs ===
- The Whereabouts of Hidden Bridges (2000) (with Advisor, Crescent Moon, and DJ Anatomy of the Oddjobs)
- The Sum of All Things, or: The Healing Power of Scab Picking (2006) (with Carbon Carousel)
- Duluth Is the Truth (2009)
- When in Rome, Kill the King (2010) (as Micheal Larsen)
- Freestyles (2010)

=== Mixtapes ===
- E&A Road Mix (2003) (Eyedea & Abilities)

=== Live albums ===
- Birthday (I Feel Triangular) (2011) (with Guitar Party)
- This Is Where We Were (2006) (Kristoff Krane, Carnage, Matza, Casey O'Brien- bass, JT Bates- drums) Face Candy
- Waste Age Teenland (2011) (Kristoff Krane, Carnage, Matza, Casey O'Brien- bass, JT Bates- drums)

=== Singles ===
- "Pushing Buttons" 12" (2000) (Eyedea & Abilities)
- "Blindly Firing" 12" (2001) (Eyedea & Abilities)
- "Now / E&A Day" 12" (2004) (Eyedea & Abilities)
- "Carbon Carousel Single Series #1" (2007) (Carbon Carousel)
- "Nervous" (2007) (Carbon Carousel)

=== Collaboration albums ===
- First Born (2001) (as Eyedea & Abilities)
- E&A (2004) (as Eyedea & Abilities)
- By the Throat (2009) (as Eyedea & Abilities)
- Grand's Sixth Sense (2011) (with DJ Abilities, as Sixth Sense [recorded in the 1990s, posthumous release])
- Sector 7g- scrap metal (December 1, 2007) (with DJ Pseudonym, Ecid, Kristoff crane, Eyedea and David mars) Produced by Ecid
- self-titled- Saturday Morning Soundtrack, Eyedea (November 15, 2006) Produced by Ecid

=== Guest appearances ===
- "Best Kind" by Slug of Atmosphere (1997)
- "Native Ones Live @ The Entry" by Atmosphere on Headshot: Vol. 6: Industrial Warfare (1998)
- "Monster Inside" by Anomaly on Howle's Book (1998)
- "Savior?" by Sole, Slug and Eyedea on Music for the Advancement of Hip Hop (1999)
- "Embarrassed" by Sage Francis on Sick of Waging War (2001)
- "Even Shadows Have Shadows" on rap sampler We Came From Beyond (2001)
- ”Frisbee” by Abstract Tribe Unique on P.A.I.N.T. (2001)
- "Gotta Love Em" by Slug & Eyedea on DJ Murge Search and Rescue (2002)
- "The Stick Up" by Atmosphere on "Headshots Se7en" (2002)
- "More From June" by Deep Puddle Dynamics on "We Aint Fessin" (2002)
- "We Aint Fessin (Double Quotes)" By Deep Puddle Dynamics on "We Aint Fessin" (2002)
- "Miss By A Mile" by Aesop Rock, Eyedea & Slug on We Came From Beyond, Vol. 2 (2003)
- "Play Dead Til They Kill You" By Saturday Morning Soundtrack on Saturday Morning Soundtrack (2005)
- "Quality Programming" by Booka B on Basementality (2005)
- "L-Asorbic Acid" by The Crest & Eyedea + Carnage on "Skeptic" (2005)
- "Everything's Perfect" by Awol One on "War of Art" (2006)
- "Dopamine" by Playaz Longue Crew on Hype Hop (2007)
- "Thanks But No Thanks" by Sector 7G on "Scrap Metal" (2007)
- "Head Tripping" by Kristoff Krane on "This Will Work For Now" (2008)
- "Is It Right" by Kristoff Krane on "This Will Work For Now" (2008)
- "Dream" by No Bird Sing on "No Bird Sing" (2009)
- "Best Friends" by Kristoff Krane on Picking Flowers Next To Roadkill (2010)
- "Dead Wallets" by Sinthesis Feat. ECID on "Movement 4:6" (2010)
- "Rockstars Don't Apologize" by ECID Feat. Awol One, and Kristoff Krane on "Werewolf Hologram" (2012)
- "Purest Disgust" by Debaser on Peerless
- "Cataract Vision" by Eyenine on Afraid to Dream
- "Perfect Medicine" by Serebe
- "Savior Self" by Sadistik Feat. CasOne, Kristoff Krane, and Alexipharmic
- "Thorns" by Aesop Rock, Slug, & Eyedea
- "Chemical Burns" by Sadistik on Ultraviolet (2014)
- "Burn Baby" by COOLETHAN on You Can Never Go Back (2024)

=== Other media ===
- In 2016, Brandon Crowson released a documentary based on Micheal Larsen's life called The World Has No Eyedea.
- In 2025, Parker Pubs (in collaboration with Eyedea's mother Kathy Averill) released a book called The Many Facets of Eyedea: Selected Writings & Oral History.
- Eyedea was featured in the storyline of Melanie Harvey's 2010 independent novel Nobody's Hero, on page 164.

== Rap battles ==
Year	Competition/Event	Opponent	Result	Notes
1998	Scribble Jam	Slug	Loss	
1999	Scribble Jam	Unseen	Win	
1999	Scribble Jam	Optimus Prime	Win	
1999	Scribble Jam	P.E.A.C.E.	Tie	both advanced
1999	Scribble Jam	Otherwize	Win	
1999	Scribble Jam	P.E.A.C.E.	Win	won the tournament
2000	Rocksteady Anniversary	PackFM	Win	
2000	Rocksteady Anniversary	Immortal Technique	Win	won the tournament
2000	HBO Blaze Battle	Ali Vegas	Win	
2000	HBO Blaze Battle	E-Dub	Win	
2000	HBO Blaze Battle	RK	Win	
2000	HBO Blaze Battle	Shells	Win	won the tournament
2000	Scribble Jam	Propane	Win	
2000	Scribble Jam	Brother Ali	Loss	
2001	Cactus Club	Mic T	None	verdict unknown
2004	Scribble Jam	Murs	None	unjudged battle
