= DJ Abilities =

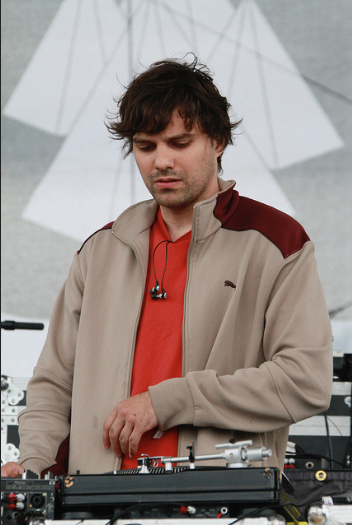
- DJ Abilities performing in 2009

Background information
- Birth name: Gregory Joseph Keltgen
- Born: October 22, 1979 (age 45)
- Origin: Albuquerque, New Mexico United States
- Genres: Alternative hip hop
- Occupation(s): Producer, DJ
- Instrument(s): Turntables MPC, Synths
- Years active: 1997–present
- Labels: Rhymesayers Entertainment
- Formerly of: Eyedea & Abilities
- Website: djabilities.com

Gregory Joseph Keltgen, better known by his stage name DJ Abilities, is an American underground hip hop producer and DJ signed to Rhymesayers Entertainment who is based in Minneapolis. He is a founding member of Eyedea & Abilities alongside Eyedea, and Semi.Official alongside I Self Devine. DJ Abilities is a member of 1200 Hobos and was also a member of Atmosphere at one point. He has won two regional DJ championships for the Midwest region.

== Career ==
DJ Abilities released First Born, a debut album with the rapper Eyedea as Eyedea & Abilities, in 2001. He handled the turntable work on El-P's 2002 solo debut album Fantastic Damage. Two more collaborative albums with Eyedea, E&A (2004) and By the Throat (2009), were both released on Rhymesayers Entertainment.

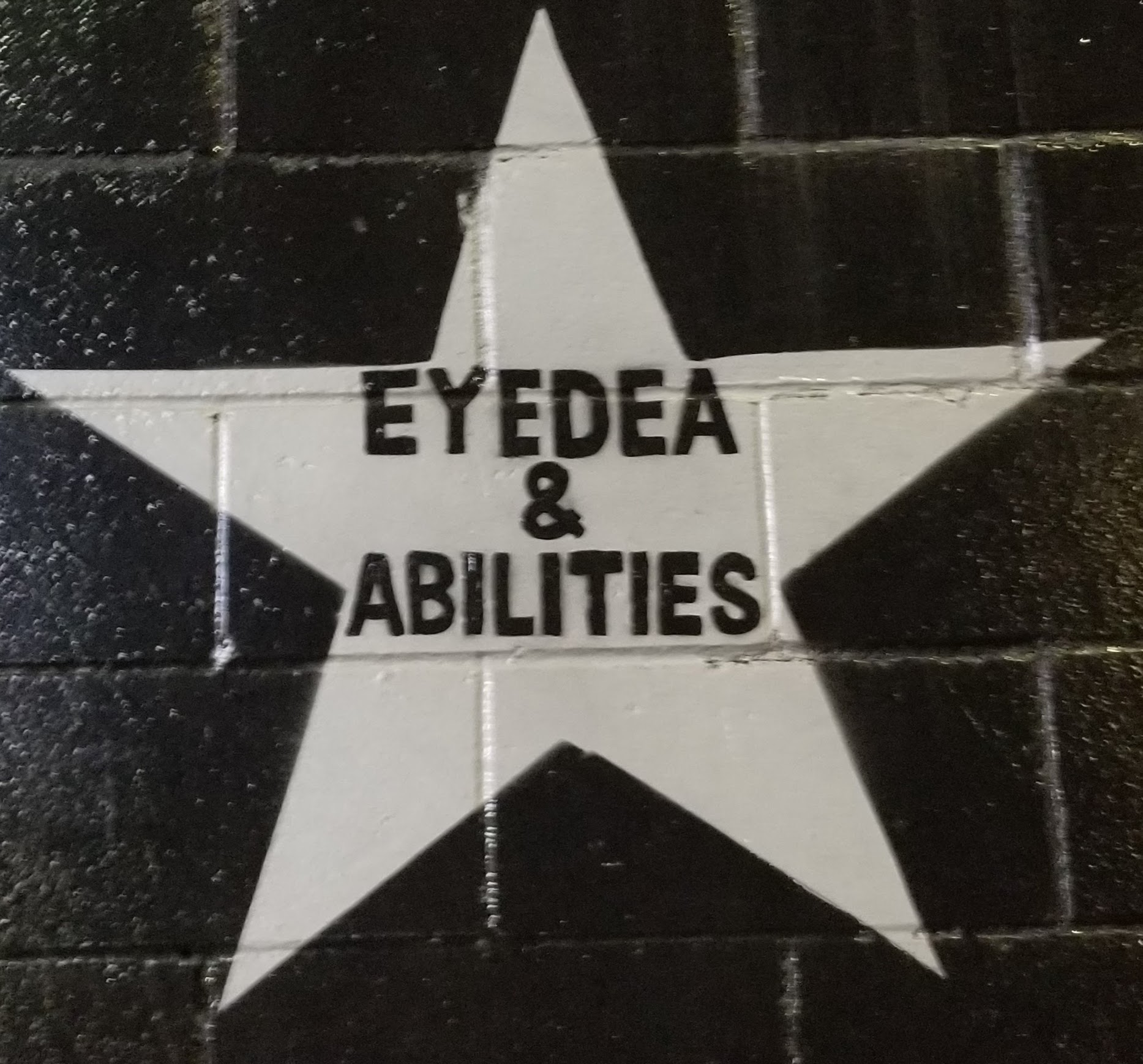
Eyedea & Abilities' star on the outside mural of the Minneapolis nightclub First Avenue

Eyedea & Abilities has been honored with a star on the outside mural of the Minneapolis nightclub First Avenue, recognizing performers that have played sold-out shows or have otherwise demonstrated a major contribution to the culture at the iconic venue. Receiving a star "might be the most prestigious public honor an artist can receive in Minneapolis," according to journalist Steve Marsh.

DJ Abilities won the Midwest regionals in the 1999 and 2001 DMC World DJ Championships. City Pages noted that he and Eyedea for their ability to interact in live on stage performances, as well as on record.

== Discography ==
=== DJ mixes ===
- Finally (1997, Rhymesayers Entertainment)
- ...For Persons with DJ Abilities (2000, Rhymesayers Entertainment)
- Now! That's What I Call Fuck Off (2012, self-released)
- The Blends (2014, self-released)

=== Productions ===
- Deep Puddle Dynamics - "Deep Puddle Theme Song", "Thought vs. Action" and "Where the Wild Things Are" from The Taste of Rain... Why Kneel? (1999) All E&A albums.

=== Guest appearances ===
- Rusty Ps - "All I Have" from Out of Many (2001)
- Unknown Prophets - "The Wrong Route" from World Premier (2001)
- El-P - Fantastic Damage (2002)
- Mr. Lif - "Return of the B-Boy" from I Phantom (2002)
- One Be Lo - L.A.B.O.R. (2011)
- Killer Mike - "Go!" from R.A.P. Music (2012)
- Seez Mics - "Post Pathic Profiteers" from Cruel Fuel (2014)
- One Be Lo - Baby (Being a black youth) (2020)
