= Joe Mabbott =

American record producer

Joe Mabbott is an American record producer and studio audio engineer who has worked with many independent and mainstream artists of the 1990s 2000s and 2010s including Atmosphere, Snoop Dogg, Brother Ali, Cloud Cult and The Matches.

In addition to record engineering, Joe Mabbott owns and operates The Hideaway Studio housed in the historic Grain Belt Brewery building in Northeast Minneapolis. The main live room at the Hideaway is a generously sized at 25x35 feet with 14-foot ceilings, with half of the room being concrete and exposed brick, and the other half sheetrock and sound-treated, allowing exceptional ambience when desired. For additional tracking purposes, The Hideaway Studio has two rooms in addition to the main live room at its disposal—the vocal booth, which at 9x14 feet can easily accommodate a drum kit or an isolated bagpiper, and a medium-sized room measuring 11x20 feet, made largely of reflective tile that allows for a massive drum sound.

== Credits ==
Joe Mabbott produced and/or engineered the following albums:

- Atmosphere – God Loves Ugly
- Atmosphere – Seven's Travels
- Atmosphere – You Can't Imagine How Much Fun We're Having
- Atmosphere – Strictly Leakage
- Atmosphere – When Life Gives You Lemons, You Paint That Shit Gold
- Atmosphere – Leak at Will
- Atmosphere – To All My Friends, Blood Makes The Blade Holy: The Atmosphere EP's
- Atmosphere – The Family Sign
- Brother Ali – Champion EP
- Brother Ali – Shadows on the Sun
- Brother Ali – The Truth Is Here
- Brother Ali – The Undisputed Truth
- Brother Ali – Us
- Brother Ali – Mourning in America and Dreaming in Color
- Cloud Cult – Advice from the Happy Hippopotamus
- Dessa – A Badly Broken Code
- Dessa – Castor, the Twin
- Doomtree – False Hopes
- Doomtree – Doomtree
- Doomtree – No Kings
- Evidence – The Weatherman LP
- Felt – Felt, Vol. 2: A Tribute to Lisa Bonet
- Gayngs – Relayted
- Heiruspecs – A Tiger Dancing
- Heiruspecs – 10 Years Strong
- Heiruspecs – Heiruspecs
- Jake One – White Van Music
- M.anifest – Manifestations
- Marianne Dissard – L'Abandon
- Marianne Dissard – The Cat. Not Me
- The Matches – A Band in Hope
- Minus the Bear – Interpretaciones del Oso
- Murs – The End of the Beginning
- Musab – Respect the Life
- Pigeon John – Pigeon John and the Summertime Pool Party
- The Plastic Constellations – Crusades
- The Plastic Constellations – We Appreciate You
- P.O.S – Ipecac Neat
- P.O.S – Audition
- P.O.S – Never Better
- Psalm One – Death of the Frequent Flyer
- Snoop Dogg – The West Coast Blueprint
