= Aurora Borealis (album) =

Studio album by Cloud Cult
- Released: June 22, 2004
- Genre: Indie pop
- Length: 49:44
- Label: Earthology

Cloud Cult chronology
They Live on the Sun (2003)	Aurora Borealis (2004)	Advice from the Happy Hippopotamus (2005)

Professional ratings
Review scores
Source	Rating
AllMusic	4/5 stars

Aurora Borealis is an album by Cloud Cult.

== Track listing ==
All songs written by Craig Minowa.

1. "Breakfast With My Shadow" (download) – 2:17
2. "Alone at a Party in a Ghost Town" – 2:23
3. "The Princess Bride" – 3:46 - Appears to be removed on Spotify, Apple Music, and Tidal. Citations as to why would be appreciated
4. "As Long as You're Happy" – 3:08
5. "Chandeliers" – 3:51
6. "Buried Poetry" – 1:47
7. "All Together Alone" – 3:52
8. "My Fictitious Life with Amily" – 3:39
9. "Grappling Hook/Northern Lights" – 6:38
10. "Lights Inside My Head" – 3:22
11. "The Sparks and Spaces Between Your Cells" – 3:44
12. "Beautiful Boy" – 4:10
  - Live performance on KUOM from September 26, 2003
13. "I Guess This Dream Is for Me" – 3:56
14. "State of the Union" – 3:11
  - Samples a State of the Union address by George W. Bush attributed as coming from CampChaos.com
