= Satisfied Soul =

2025 studio album by Brother Ali

Studio album by Brother Ali
- Released: February 14, 2025
- Genre: Hip-hop
- Length: 57:04
- Label: Mello Music Group
- Producer: Ant

Brother Ali chronology
| Love & Service (2024) | Satisfied Soul (2025) |

Satisfied Soul is a studio album by Brother Ali released initially on February 14, 2025, through Mello Music Group. The album was produced entirely by Ant, the producer for Atmosphere and a longtime collaborator of Ali. The album contains 17 tracks without guest rap appearances, although several musicians contributed live instrumentation. It followed Ali's 2024 album Love & Service and marked his first full-length release for Mello Music Group.

== Background and release ==
In an interview published shortly before the album's release, Ali described the project as a return to the established sound of his collaborations with Ant. He said the title reflected feelings of happiness and gratitude. The February 14 release date also coincided with the anniversary of Ali's conversion to Islam as a teenager. The digital edition was released on that date, followed by a CD edition on March 21 and a double-LP edition on March 28.

== Composition and themes ==
Jesse Ducker of Albumism described Ant's production as rooted in blues and soul and viewed the album as a spiritual successor to Ali and Ant's 2009 collaboration Us. The record combines autobiographical writing with social commentary and spiritual reflection. "Under the Stars" is narrated from the perspective of an unhoused man, while "Better But Us" reflects on the pressures surrounding the end of a relationship. "Mysterious Things" addresses Ali's relationship with his father, and "Ocean of Rage" considers social frustration and the ways people attempt to cope with it.

Other songs focus more directly on self-examination and music. "Personal" discusses self-improvement through spirituality and therapy, while the closing track, "Sing Myself Whole", presents music as a means of expression and healing. Apple Music's editorial description similarly highlighted the album's treatment of family relationships, Ali's development as an emcee, homelessness, and humorous stories from his career.

== Critical reception ==
Professional ratings
Review scores
| Source | Rating |
|---|---|
| Cult MTL | 8.5/10 |
| RapReviews | 8.5/10 |

Darcy MacDonald of Cult MTL praised Ali for his re-evaluation of perspectives and past experiences through the lens of maturity. Sy Shackleford of RapReviews wrote that the album maintained Ali's customary level of quality and argued that the rapper's strongest work often comes from his collaborations with Ant.

== Track listing ==
All tracks were written by Brother Ali and produced by Ant.

Satisfied Soul track listing
| No. | Title | Length |
|---|---|---|
| 1. | "Satisfied Soul" | 4:18 |
| 2. | "Deep Cuts" | 3:07 |
| 3. | "Higher Learning at the Skyway" | 2:57 |
| 4. | "D.R.U.M." | 3:42 |
| 5. | "The Counts" | 3:52 |
| 6. | "Cast Aside" | 4:10 |
| 7. | "Ocean of Rage" | 3:31 |
| 8. | "Under the Stars" | 2:00 |
| 9. | "Personal" | 2:24 |
| 10. | "Two Dudes" | 3:53 |
| 11. | "Better But Us" | 3:39 |
| 12. | "Name of the One" | 2:03 |
| 13. | "Immortalized" | 1:35 |
| 14. | "Head Heart Hands" | 3:44 |
| 15. | "Mysterious Things" | 3:54 |
| 16. | "Handwriting" | 3:59 |
| 17. | "Sing Myself Whole" | 4:16 |
| Total length: | | 57:04 |

== Personnel ==
Credits adapted from AllMusic.

- Brother Ali - vocals, composition, executive production
- Ant - production, arrangement
- G Koop - guitar
- King Michael Coy - bass, guitar
- Seth Duin - guitar
- Sean McPherson - bass
- Joe Mabbott - keyboards, percussion, vocals, mixing
- Bruce Templeton - mastering
- B+ - photography
- Brent Rollins - art direction, design, logo
- Na'eel Ahmad Cajee - calligraphy
- Brendan Kelly - coordination, executive production
- Michael Tolle - executive production
