= Light Chasers =

Studio album by Cloud Cult
- Released: September 14, 2010 (Stores); June 28, 2010 (Website)
- Genre: Indie pop
- Length: 56:01

Cloud Cult chronology
| Feel Good Ghosts (Tea-Partying Through Tornadoes) (2008) | Light Chasers (2010) | Love (2013) |

Professional ratings
Review scores
| Source | Rating |
|---|---|
| Allmusic | 3.5/5 stars |
| The A.V. Club | (B+) |
| Paste Magazine | (7.9/10) |
| Pitchfork Media | (5.4/10) |
| Slant Magazine | 3.5/5 stars |

Light Chasers is the tenth studio album by the American indie rock group Cloud Cult that was released in stores on September 14, 2010. It was previously released on the band's website via digital download and mail order on June 28, 2010.

== Track list ==
All songs written by Craig Minowa.

| No. | Title | Length |
|---|---|---|
| 1. | "The Mission: Unexplainable Stories" | 4:37 |
| 2. | "The Departure: Today We Give Ourselves to the Fire" | 2:58 |
| 3. | "The Invocation (p.1) - You'll Be Bright" | 3:54 |
| 4. | "The Birth" | 1:25 |
| 5. | "The Baby - You Were Born" | 2:31 |
| 6. | "The Lessons - Exploding People" | 4:27 |
| 7. | "The Interference" | 1:33 |
| 8. | "The Battles - Room Full of People in Your Head" | 4:29 |
| 9. | "The Escape - Running With the Wolves" | 3:29 |
| 10. | "The Acceptance - Responsible" | 2:42 |
| 11. | "The Surrender - Guessing Game" | 1:49 |
| 12. | "The Strength - Forces of the Unseen" | 3:45 |
| 13. | "The Invocation (p.2) - Blessings" | 6:35 |
| 14. | "The Awakening - Dawn" | 3:02 |
| 15. | "The Contact" | 1:20 |
| 16. | "The Arrival - There's So Much Energy In Us" | 7:23 |

== Personnel ==
Credits are adapted from the album's liner notes.

- Sarah Young - cello, backing vocals
- Shannon Frid - violin, backing vocals
- Shawn Neary - bass, trombone, backing vocals
- Arlen Peiffer - drums
- Sarah Elhardt - French horn, trumpet
- Connie Minowa - backing vocals
- Scott West - backing vocals
