= Rites of Passage (Brother Ali album) =

Studio album by Brother Ali
- Released: April 28, 2000
- Recorded: 1999–2000
- Genre: Hip hop
- Label: Rhymesayers Entertainment
- Producer: Brother Ali

Brother Ali chronology
Rites of Passage (2000)	Shadows on the Sun (2003)

Rites of Passage is the first album by American hip hop artist Brother Ali. It was released on Rhymesayers Entertainment on April 28, 2000. It is a cassette-only album produced by Brother Ali with very small original circulation. It has been re-issued following Ali's very successful later albums. From the Rhymesayers website: "Rites of Passage is a personal journey through one emcees experience of life and hip hop alike. Features Mad Son of the Unknown Prophets, Queen Aminah and Desdamona."

Due to popular demand, there was an attempt to re-master the tape and put it on CD. Rhymesayers tried to, but were unsuccessful. Instead, they gave their best effort on CDs to the first 300 people that pre-ordered Ali's Champion EP.

== Track listing ==
1. "Intro" – 1:18
2. "Whatever" – 4:25
3. "Think It Through" – 5:09
4. "Nine Double 'Em" – 5:03
5. "Eye of the Storm" – 4:29
6. "We Will Always B" – 2:15
  - Featuring Desdamona
7. "So Dearly" – 2:27
8. "Music in My Head" – 1:55
9. "Voices in My Head" – 3:54
10. "They're Finished" – 4:05
11. "Tofuti" – 2:36
  - Featuring Queen Aminah
12. "Ali Boombaye" – 3:56
13. "You Never Know" – 3:55
  - Featuring Mad Son
14. "Three Day Journey" – 5:06
15. "The Session" – 3:20
16. "The Phoenix" – 4:20
  - Bonus track included on the CD reissue
  - Featuring Musab
17. "Eighty-8" – 1:52
  - Bonus track included on the CD reissue
  - Featuring DJ BK One
