= The Meaning of 8 =

Studio album by Cloud Cult
- Released: April 10, 2007
- Genre: Indie pop

Cloud Cult chronology
Advice from the Happy Hippopotamus (2005)	The Meaning of 8 (2007)	Feel Good Ghosts (Tea-Partying Through Tornadoes) (2008)

Professional ratings
Review scores
Source	Rating
Allmusic	link
Pitchfork Media	(6.9/10) link
The Wheel's Still in Spin	(not rated) link

The Meaning of 8 is the seventh studio album by the experimental indie rock band Cloud Cult.

== Track listing ==
All songs written by Craig Minowa.

1. "Chain Reaction" (download) – 4:28
2. "Please Remain Calm" – 3:55
3. "Chemicals Collide" – 3:16
4. "Pretty Voice" (download) – 3:45
5. "Brain Gateway" – 3:31
6. "Take Your Medicine" (download) – 4:41
7. "Your 8th Birthday" – 4:06
8. "Dance for the Dead" – 3:48
9. "Everywhere All at One Time" – 1:07
10. "Purpose" (download) – 3:47
11. "A Good God" – 2:34
12. "The Shape of 8" – 1:30
13. "The Girl Underground" – 2:47
14. "2x2x2" – 4:16
15. "Thanks" – 3:45
16. "Alien Christ" – 3:39
17. "The Deaf Girl's Song" – 3:43
18. "Hope" – 4:09
19. "Song of the Deaf Girl" – 1:28

B-Side

1. "May Your Lives Be Long" - 4:18
2. "Step Forward" - 3:22
3. "818" - 3:21

== Personnel ==
Credits are adapted from the album's liner notes.

- Sarah Young - cello, backup vocals
- Dan Greenwood - drums, backup vocals
- Matthew Freed - bass
- Craig Minowa - keys, guitars, lead vocals, piano, glockenspiel, digital drums
- Connie Minowa - back-up soprano vocals on "Thanks"

Additional musicians

- Alex Galle-From - violin on "Chain Reaction", "Dance for the Dead" and "Deaf Girl's Song"
- Jannet Greene - clarinet on "Pretty Voice" and "Chemicals Collide"
- Zach Zins - trombone on "Pretty Voice" and "Hope"
