= All the Beauty in This Whole Life =

Studio album by Brother Ali
- Released: May 5, 2017
- Studios: Stophouse Studios (Minneapolis, MN)
- Genre: Hip-hop
- Length: 1:01:29
- Label: Rhymesayers
- Producer: Ant

Brother Ali chronology
Mourning in America and Dreaming in Color (2012)	All the Beauty in This Whole Life (2017)	Secrets & Escapes (2019)

All the Beauty in This Whole Life is the sixth full-length studio album by American rapper Brother Ali. It was released on May 5, 2017, via Rhymesayers Entertainment. Recording sessions took place at Stophouse Studios in Minneapolis. Entirely produced by Ant, it features guest appearances from Amir Sulaiman, Dem Atlas, Idris Phillips and Sa-Roc.

In the United States, the album peaked at number 125 on the Billboard 200, number 39 on the Top Album Sales, number 38 on the Top Current Album Sales, number 8 on the Independent Albums and number 18 on the Vinyl Albums charts.

== Background ==
In late-March 2017, Brother Ali revealed album title, tracklist and release date.

The album touches on themes of his Muslim faith, and includes "Pray for Me", a track inspired by Brother Ali's experience with albinism, and "Out of Here", which references the suicides of his father and grandfather. The album marks Brother Ali's first album in five years.

== Critical reception ==
Professional ratings
Aggregate scores
Source	Rating
Metacritic	80/100
Review scores
Source	Rating
AllMusic	4/5 stars
Exclaim!	9/10
HipHopDX	3.9/5
Noisey	(2-star Honorable Mention)
Pitchfork	7.4/10
PopMatters	7/10
RapReviews	8.5/10
Tom Hull	B+

All the Beauty in This Whole Life was met with generally favorable reviews from music critics. At Metacritic, which assigns a normalized rating out of 100 to reviews from mainstream publications, the album received an average score of 80 based on six reviews.

Riley Wallace of Exclaim! praised the album, calling it "a welcome work by an artist who's put it all on the table over the past six albums; his seventh was well worth the wait". Sy Shackleford of RapReviews declared: "with All the Beauty in This Whole Life, he created not just an album that represents an arranged amalgamation of his own experiences, but also a hip-hop album with so much soul that Rakim would blush". AllMusic's Thom Jurek wrote: "Ali returns with All the Beauty in This Whole Life, a record that never shies away from facing injustice but focuses on a different aspect of activism: inner transformation. That's not a new age slogan but ancient wisdom carried from Tao to Gandhi to MLK; Ali brings it down the pipe with the hammer of compassion". Jesse Fairfax of HipHopDX noted: "urgent and impactful as always, his heartfelt music succeeds at balancing out traditional drum programming with original music composition". Jay Balfour of Pitchfork concluded: "it's both sharp-tongued and warm hearted, an LP-length memoir that dabbles in political manifesto. But it comes over like an album Ali made for himself, and he sounds better off because of it". Mike Schiller of PopMatters called it "a solid album with words worth listening to and taking to heart. Brother Ali's art is aging well, thanks to his fearlessness in allowing that art to mature along with him".

== Track listing ==
No.	Title	Length
1.	"Pen to Paper" (featuring Amir Sulaiman)	2:38
2.	"Own Light (What Hearts Are For)"	4:09
3.	"Special Effects" (featuring Dem Atlas)	4:51
4.	"Can't Take That Away"	4:18
5.	"Dear Black Son"	3:51
6.	"We Got This" (featuring Sa-Roc)	3:01
7.	"Uncle Usi Taught Me"	5:54
8.	"Pray for Me"	3:43
9.	"It Ain't Easy"	3:53
10.	"Never Learn"	4:45
11.	"Tremble"	3:09
12.	"Before They Called You White"	3:36
13.	"The Bitten Apple" (featuring Idris Phillips)	4:23
14.	"Out of Here"	4:31
15.	"All the Beauty in This Whole Life"	4:47
Total length:		1:01:29

== Charts ==
Chart (2017)	Peak position
US Billboard 200	125
US Top Album Sales (Billboard)	39
US Top Current Album Sales (Billboard)	38
US Independent Albums (Billboard)	8
US Vinyl Albums (Billboard)	18
