= Sa-Roc =

American rapper

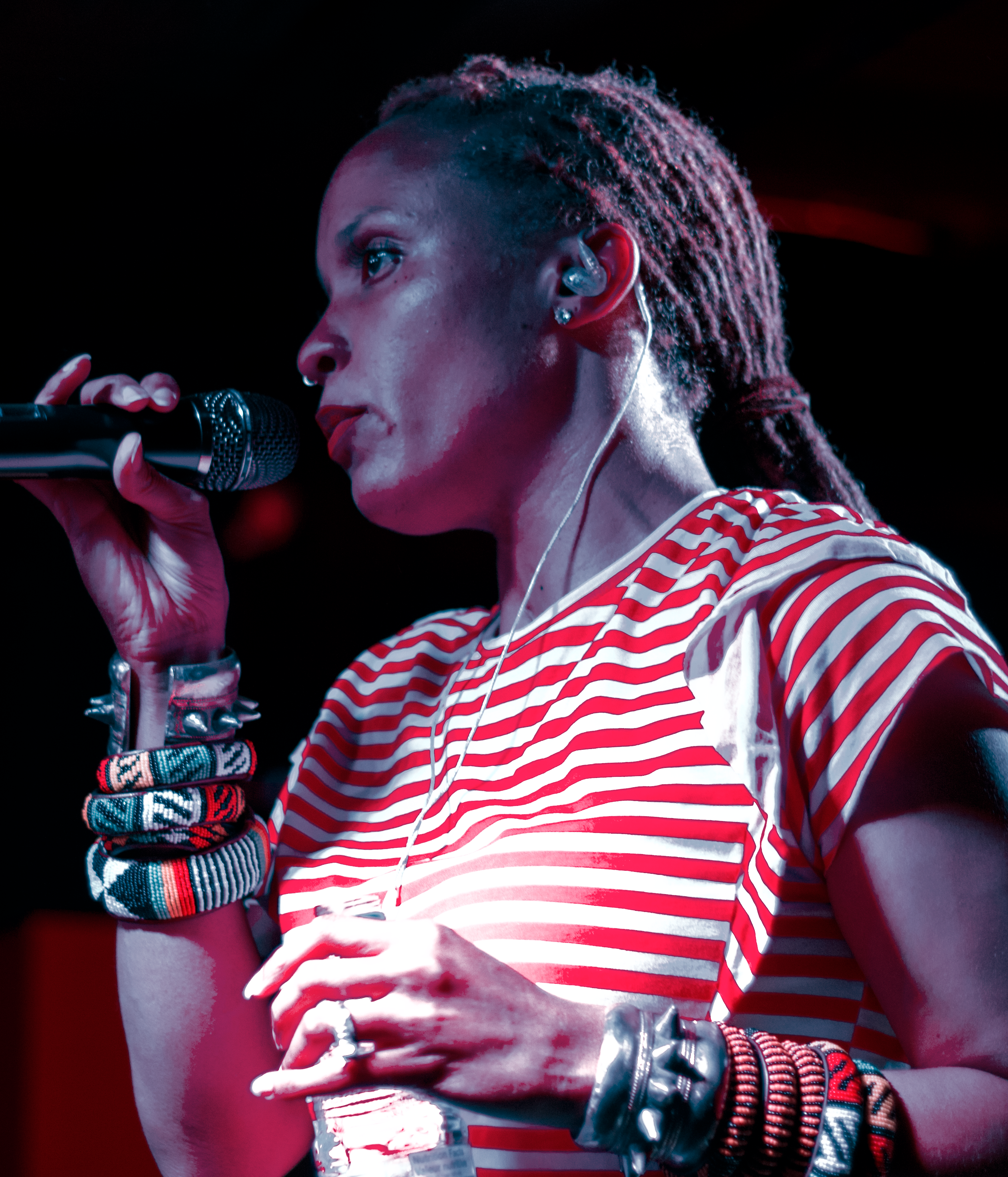
- Sa-Roc performing in 2017

Background information
- Born: Assata Perkins; December 28, 1981 (age 44); Southeast, Washington, D.C., United States
- Genres: Conscious hip-hop
- Occupation: Rapper
- Years active: 2002–present
- Label: Rhymesayers Entertainment
- Website: sarocthemc.com

Assata Perkins (born December 28, 1981), known professionally as Sa-Roc (/sɒ rɒk/), is an American rapper. In 2016, she became the second female rapper to sign with the Rhymesayers label.

== Early life ==
Sa-Roc was born in Southeast, Washington, D.C., on December 28, 1981. She grew up in the Congress Heights neighborhood. As a teenager, she was a student at City of Peace, an organization devoted to encouraging students to become active in their community through theater. She has been open about her history of self-harm as an adolescent, later referencing this period in her song "Forever". She attended the Nation House school and then the College of Arts and Sciences at Howard University where she studied biology.

== Career ==
In 2002, Sa-Roc met Atlanta-based producer Sol Messiah and the two began a long collaboration. Although she recorded albums, Sa-Roc did not start performing on stage until a 2011 benefit for Mutulu Shakur.

In 2013, she released her album The Book of Light which included "Just Us" written in honor of Troy Davis. In 2014, she collaborated with David Banner on the single "The Who?" for her Nebuchadnezzar album. She also performed with Black Thought at the 2014 A3C Hip Hop Festival. In 2015, she released her mixtape The Legend of Black Moses. In May 2016, Sa-Roc signed with Rhymesayers. Her first official appearance on Rhymesayers is a collaboration with Brother Ali on his All the Beauty in This Whole Life album. She also toured with Brother Ali on The Own Light Tour in support of the new album. In February 2018, she debuted her single "Forever". In October 2018, she debuted her single "Goddess Gang". The track was featured in the 2019 racing video game Need for Speed Heat. Her first Rhymesayers album, The Sharecropper's Daughter, was released on October 2, 2020. The Economist named it as one of the 15 best albums of 2020. Sa-Roc's song "Believe" was featured in And She Could Be Next, a 2020 PBS documentary about the Squad.

== Influences ==
Sa-Roc's influences include artists such as Billie Holiday, Outkast, Bad Brains, Nirvana and Björk. Her name is a combination of her childhood nickname "Sa Sa" and a tribute to hip hop emcee Sha-Rock.

== Discography ==
Albums

- Supernova (2008)
- Journey of the Starseed (2010)
- Stardust (2010)
- Ether Warz (2011)
- The Book of Light (2013)
- Babylon (2013)
- Nebuchadnezzar (2014)
- Extra-Terrestrial (2015)
- Gift of the Magi (2015)
- The Sharecropper's Daughter (2020)
- The Sharecropper's Daughter Deluxe (2021)

Mixtapes

- The Legend of Black Moses (2015)

EPs

- Astral Chronicles (2008)
- MetaMorpheus (2016)
