= Love (Cloud Cult album) =

Studio album by Cloud Cult
- Released: March 5, 2013
- Genre: Indie pop

Cloud Cult chronology
Light Chasers (2010)	Love (2013)	The Seeker (2016)

Professional ratings
Review scores
Source	Rating
AllMusic	2.5/5 stars

Love is the ninth studio album by Cloud Cult, released on March 5, 2013.

MTV compared the album's first single, "Good Friend," to Polyphonic Spree, Arcade Fire, and Weezer.

== Track listing ==
All songs written by Craig Minowa.

1. You’re the Only Thing in Your Way
2. It’s Your Decision
3. Complicated Creation
4. 1x1x1
5. All the Things We Couldn’t See
6. The Calling
7. Love and the First Law of Thermodynamics
8. Good Friend
9. Meet Me Where You’re Going
10. Sleepwalker
11. It Takes a Lot
12. Catharsis
13. The Show Starts Now

== Personnel ==
Credits are adapted from the album's liner notes.

- Sarah Elhardt-Perbix - French horn, trumpet, accordion, backing vocals
- Shannon Frid-Rubin - violin, backing vocals
- Craig Minowa - lead vocals, guitars, bass, keys, piano, digital drums
- Shawn Neary - trombone, glockenspiel, banjo, backing vocals
- Arlen Peiffer - drumset, backing vocals
