= Feel Good Ghosts (Tea-Partying Through Tornadoes) =

Studio album by Cloud Cult
- Released: April 8, 2008
- Genre: Indie pop
- Length: 39:00
- Label: Earthology

Cloud Cult chronology
The Meaning of 8 (2007)	Feel Good Ghosts (Tea-Partying Through Tornadoes) (2008)	Light Chasers (2010)

Professional ratings
Review scores
Source	Rating
AllMusic	3/5 stars
The A.V. Club	(A)
Paste Magazine	(?)
Pitchfork	(4.2/10)

Feel Good Ghosts is an album by Cloud Cult released on Tuesday, April 8, 2008.

== Track listing ==
All songs written by Craig Minowa.

1. "No One Said It Would Be Easy" – 3:33
2. "Everybody Here Is a Cloud" – 3:16
3. "The Tornado Lessons" – 2:34
4. "When Water Comes to Life" – 3:47
5. "Must Explore" – 0:21
6. "Journey of the Featherless" – 3:06
7. "The Ghost Inside Our House" – 2:52
8. "It's What You Need" – 1:06
9. "Story of the Grandson of Jesus" – 2:36
10. "Hurricane and Fire Survival Guide" – 3:49
11. "May Your Hearts Stay Strong" – 4:20
12. "The Will of a Volcano" – 2:37
13. "Love You All" – 5:03
