= They Live on the Sun =

Studio album by Cloud Cult
- Released: July 7, 2003
- Genre: Indie pop
- Length: 62:03
- Label: Earthology/The Orchard

Cloud Cult chronology
| Lost Songs from the Lost Years (2012) | They Live on the Sun (2003) | Aurora Borealis (2004) |

Professional ratings
Review scores
| Source | Rating |
|---|---|
| Allmusic | 3.5/5 stars |

They Live on the Sun is an album by Cloud Cult, inspired in large part by the 2002 death of songwriter Craig Minowa's son Kaidin, whose voice is sampled on the songs "I'm Not Gone" and "Took You for Granted".

== Track listing ==
All songs written by Craig Minowa.

1. "On the Sun" – 3:33
2. "Moon's Thoughts" – 2:34
3. "Turtle Shell" – 1:24
4. "Fairy Tale" – 2:11
5. "It" – 2:50
6. "Estupido" – 3:25
7. "Radio Fodder" – 2:13
8. "Da Dum" – 2:56
9. "Man on the Moon" – 3:06
10. "Took You for Granted" – 3:11
11. "Toys in the Attic" – 1:18
12. "It's Gay" – 1:10
13. "Best Friend" – 1:58
14. "Waitress" – 1:44
15. "Back Again Pt. II" – 5:36
16. "Shortenin' Bread" – 2:20
17. "Three Times a Lady" – 5:36
18. "I'm Not Gone" – 2:25
19. "Your Love Will Live Forever" – 4:36
20. "Sleeping Days Pt. II" – 3:56
21. "6 Days" (Radio mix) – 4:01
