= Mourning in America and Dreaming in Color =

Studio album by Brother Ali
- Released: September 18, 2012
- Genre: Hip hop
- Length: 51:41; 59:24 (Deluxe Version)
- Label: Rhymesayers Entertainment
- Producer: Jake One

Brother Ali chronology
The Bite Marked Heart (2012)	Mourning in America and Dreaming in Color (2012)	Left in the Deck (2013)

Professional ratings
Aggregate scores
Source	Rating
Metacritic	80/100
Review scores
Source	Rating
Alarm	favorable
AllMusic	4/5 stars
Consequence of Sound	C+
The Guardian	3/5 stars
HipHopDX	4/5 stars
Pitchfork	7.9/10
PopMatters	7/10 stars
XXL	XL

Mourning in America and Dreaming in Color is the fifth studio album by American rapper Brother Ali. It was released via Rhymesayers Entertainment on September 18, 2012. Entirely produced by Jake One, it includes a guest appearance from Dr. Cornel West. It reached number 44 on the Billboard 200 chart. It sold 10,000 copies in its first week of release.

== Critical reception ==
At Metacritic, which assigns a weighted average score out of 100 to reviews from mainstream critics, Mourning in America and Dreaming in Color received an average score of 80% based on 11 reviews.

David Jeffries of AllMusic gave the album 4 stars out of 5, saying, "Layered viewpoints, bittersweet situations, and complicated anger flow out of this articulate effort, but the sweet trick of the album is how approachable it is, living up to its title with equal shares of Mourning and Dreaming." Nate Patrin of Pitchfork gave the album a 7.9 out of 10, saying, ''Mourning in America and Dreaming in Color is where the political agitation of The Undisputed Truth and the social humanism of Us intersect, and there's no vague platitudes or defeatist cynicism here."

Jaeki Cho of XXL said, "[Jake One's] distinguished soul production provides the necessary thump throughout, proving that one-producer-one-MC formula works superbly for this juncture."

Exclaim! named it as one of the most unappreciated albums of 2012. Potholes in My Blog placed it at number 41 on the "50 Best Albums of 2012" list.

== Track listing ==
No.	Title	Length
1.	"Letter to My Countrymen" (featuring Dr. Cornel West)	4:04
2.	"Only Life I Know"	4:01
3.	"Stop the Press"	4:01
4.	"Mourning in America"	4:08
5.	"Gather Round" (featuring Amir Sulaiman)	4:39
6.	"Work Everyday"	3:45
7.	"Need a Knot"	2:45
8.	"Won More Hit"	3:43
9.	"Say Amen"	2:59
10.	"Fajr"	3:51
11.	"Namesake"	2:10
12.	"All You Need"	3:14
13.	"My Beloved" (featuring Choklate & Tone Trezure)	3:58
14.	"Singing This Song"	4:22
Total length:		51:41

deluxe edition bonus tracks
No.	Title	Length
15.	"Just Fine"	4:18
16.	"Dreaming in Color"	3:25
Total length:		59:24

Notes

- The bonus tracks are only available digitally through iTunes, Spotify, Amazon Music and Google Play Music.

== Charts ==
Chart	Peak position
US Billboard 200	44
US Independent Albums (Billboard)	10
US Tastemaker Albums (Billboard)	15
US Top R&B/Hip-Hop Albums (Billboard)	6
US Rap Albums (Billboard)	5
