= Heiruspecs (album) =

Studio album by Heiruspecs
- Released: December 13, 2008
- Genre: Hip-hop
- Length: 77:17
- Producer: Joe Mabbott

Heiruspecs chronology
A Tiger Dancing (2004)	Heiruspecs (2008)	Night Falls (2014)

Heiruspecs is a self-titled album by Saint Paul, Minnesota hip-hop group Heiruspecs. It was recorded at The Hideaway Studio in Minneapolis, with producer Joe Mabbott. The album was released on December 13, 2008 at First Avenue.

There are several collaborations on the album. The track "Sunshower" features Dan Wilson of Semisonic, and "Change Is Coming" features Dessa of Doomtree. The album's first single is "Get Up," which discusses national divisions over an intense guitar riff.

== Track listing ==
1. Without Much Sleep
2. Get Up
3. All In All
4. Interlude A
5. Let It Fly
6. Broken Record Feat. I Self Devine
7. Pay To Play
8. We Want A New Flow
9. Lenses Feat. Maria Isa
10. Slammin' Caprice Doors
11. Change Is Coming Feat. Dessa & New Mc
12. Ten Miles A Day
13. On My Way
14. Move With Me Feat. Mastermind
15. Interlude B
16. Sunshower Feat. Dan Wilson
17. The Pushback
18. Smash
19. Diy
20. Tongue Slingers Feat. Carnage
21. The Nguyens
