= Uncle Sam Goddamn =

Single by Brother Ali

from the album The Undisputed Truth
- Released: May 4, 2007
- Genre: Underground hip hop; political hip hop
- Length: 4:57
- Label: Rhymesayers Entertainment
- Songwriter: Brother Ali
- Producer: Ant

Brother Ali singles chronology
"Truth Is" (2007)	"Uncle Sam Goddamn" (2007)

"Uncle Sam Goddamn" is the second single from Brother Ali's second full-length album The Undisputed Truth. The single was released on May 4, 2007 as a 12" vinyl. There are three different editions of the single; a red version, a white version and a blue version each containing a different B-side. The song features a blues-influenced beat produced by Ant to assist its "bitingly critical" lyrics. Its lyrics harshly condemn the United States government for its past involvement in slavery and the crack cocaine trade, and its failure to provide for the poor. Its music video contains controversial images of cross burning, lynching and police brutality alongside images of American landmarks like the White House and Capitol building.

Brother Ali has been under pressure from the recording industry due to lyrics from this song, claiming creative interference from "somebody I don't wanna name, but some of you probably has their cell phones." The unnamed corporation ultimately withdrew its sponsorship of Ali, causing him to truncate parts of his 2007 tour. Furthermore, on the song "Second Time Around" with Benzi and Wale, Ali makes references to being kicked off a tour followed by the line "Verizon dissed me too, cuz I was too political." The song is notably critical of the United States government, with accusations that the political system is addicted to war.

The introduction, in which Brother Ali says, "The name of this song is Uncle Sam Goddamn. It's a show tune, but the show ain't been written for it yet," is an allusion to Nina Simone's "Mississippi Goddam."

== Track listing ==
=== 12" vinyl (Red) ===
==== A-Side ====
1. "Uncle Sam Goddamn (Censored)"
2. "Uncle Sam Goddamn (Uncensored)"
3. "Uncle Sam Goddamn (Instrumental)"

==== B-Side ====
1. "No Alibis (Censored)"
2. "No Alibis (Uncensored)"
3. "No Alibis (Instrumental)"

=== 12" vinyl (White) ===
==== A-Side ====
1. "Uncle Sam Goddamn (Censored)"
2. "Uncle Sam Goddamn (Uncensored)"
3. "Uncle Sam Goddamn (Instrumental)"

==== B-Side ====
1. "Palm the Joker (Censored)"
2. "Palm the Joker (Uncensored)"
3. "Palm the Joker (Instrumental)"

=== 12" vinyl (Blue) ===
==== A-Side ====
1. "Uncle Sam Goddamn (Censored)"
2. "Uncle Sam Goddamn (Uncensored)"
3. "Uncle Sam Goddamn (Instrumental)"

==== B-Side ====
1. "Talkin' My Shit (Uncensored)"
2. "Talkin' My Shit (Instrumental)"
3. "Talkin' My Shit (Acappella)"
