= Night Falls =

Studio album by Heiruspecs
- Released: April 22, 2014
- Recorded: 2009–2014
- Genre: Hip-hop
- Producer: Heiruspecs

Heiruspecs chronology
Heiruspecs (2008)	Night Falls (2014)

Night Falls is the seventh studio album released by American hip-hop group Heiruspecs. It was released on April 22, 2014 independently. It is the band's first full-length LP since 2008's self-titled album.

== Track listing ==
No.	Title	Length
1.	"Let's Go"	4:25
2.	"WATF"	3:28
3.	"Power"	4:13
4.	"Herriers"	2:57
5.	"Towers"	4:45
6.	"Cruise Control"	3:20
7.	"4024 Ad"	1:07
8.	"Been Around"	4:26
9.	"On the Ground (feat. Chastity Brown)"	4:48
10.	"Drive Slow (feat. Dave Simonett of Trampled by Turtles)"	5:10
11.	"No Good Situation"	5:12
12.	"Snapshot"	3:09
13.	"Merry Go Round"	4:32
14.	"Walter White"	4:43
