= The Seeker (album) =

Studio album by Cloud Cult
- Released: February 12, 2016
- Genre: Indie rock; experimental rock
- Label: Earthology

Cloud Cult chronology
Love (2013)	The Seeker (2016)	Metamorphosis (2022)

Professional ratings
Review scores
Source	Rating
Exclaim!	8/10 stars

The Seeker is an album by indie rock band Cloud Cult. It was released on February 12, 2016 to positive acclaim. It marked Cloud Cult's first album partially funded through PledgeMusic, a crowd sourcing service for bands.

== Track listing ==
1. Living in Awe
2. To the Great Unknown
3. Days to Remember
4. Chromatica
5. Come Home
6. No Hell
7. Everything You Thought You Had
8. Time Machine Invention
9. The Pilgrimage
10. Three Storms Until You Learn to Float
11. You Never Were Alone
12. Prelude to an End
13. Through the Ages

== Personnel ==
Credits are adapted from the album's liner notes.

- Shannon Frid-Rubin - violin and backing vocals
- Jeremy Harvey - drums, percussion and backing vocals
- Craig Minowa - guitars, keys, harmonica, mandolin and lead vocals
- Shawn Neary - bass, trombone, tuba, banjo, harmonium and backing vocals
- Sarah Perbix - keys, French horn, trumpet and backing vocals
- Daniel Zamzow - cello, mandola and backing vocals
- Jeff D. Johnson - auxiliary vocals
- Connie Minowa - auxiliary vocals
