= Secrets & Escapes =

2019 studio album by Brother Ali

Studio album by Brother Ali
- Released: November 1, 2019
- Genre: Hip hop
- Length: 32:55
- Label: Rhymesayers
- Producer: Evidence

Brother Ali chronology
All the Beauty in This Whole Life (2017)	Secrets & Escapes (2019)	Brother Minutester Vol. 1 (2021)

Secrets & Escapes is the seventh studio album by American rapper Brother Ali. It was released on November 1, 2019, by Rhymesayers Entertainment. The album was produced entirely by rapper and producer Evidence and features guest appearances by Pharoahe Monch, C.S. Armstrong, Evidence, and Talib Kweli.

The principal recording sessions took place during three trips Brother Ali made to Venice, California. Reviewers commonly praised the pair's chemistry, Evidence's raw production, and Ali's reflective writing, although some regarded the album's brevity and loose construction as limitations.

== Background and recording ==
Secrets & Escapes followed Brother Ali's 2017 album All the Beauty in This Whole Life. Unlike many of Ali's previous records, which were largely produced by Ant, the project was a full-length collaboration with Evidence. Rhymesayers described the album as the result of the artists pushing beyond their usual working methods, and released it without a conventional advance announcement.

According to the album's back-cover credits, Brother Ali and Evidence recorded and engineered the project in Venice and Minneapolis. Chris Pummill handled the recording of Pharoahe Monch and Talib Kweli's contributions.

== Music and lyrics ==
Critics described Secrets & Escapes as raw and stripped down, with boom bap drums, soul and jazz samples, and arrangements that preserve the informal character of the sessions. The album's lyrics address faith, family, music, ambition, vanity, self-examination, and the conflict between public identity and private uncertainty.

== Release and promotion ==
Rhymesayers released the album digitally on November 1, 2019, without an advance album announcement. Physical editions included a compact disc and a 12-inch picture-disc LP housed in a die-cut jacket.

== Critical reception ==
Professional ratings
Review scores
Source	Rating
Scratched Vinyl	8/10
Spectrum Pulse	6/10
UndergroundHipHopBlog.com	8/10

Thom Jurek of AllMusic viewed the album as a successful back-to-basics collaboration, emphasizing the energy of its unpolished recording process and the way Ali's discussions of faith, family, ambition, and self-criticism interact with Evidence's production. Chi Chi Thalken of Scratched Vinyl gave it an 8-out-of-10 rating, praising its informal cypher-like atmosphere and describing the project as an enjoyable return to the fundamentals of hip hop, while noting that it lacked the scale and polish of some of Ali's earlier albums.

UndergroundHipHopBlog.com also rated the album 8 out of 10. Its reviewer called it one of Brother Ali's strongest efforts and highlighted the chemistry between Ali's lyricism and Evidence's production despite the short running time. Mark Grondin of Spectrum Pulse was more reserved, assigning a 6-out-of-10 rating. He praised the sample-based production, Ali's self-awareness, and several guest performances, but argued that some songs felt underdeveloped and criticized the framing of "Red Light Zone".

== Track listing ==
All tracks were produced by Evidence.

Secrets & Escapes track listing
No.	Title	Length
1.	"Abu Enzo"	3:53
2.	"Situated" (featuring Pharoahe Monch)	4:36
3.	"Greatest That Never Lived"	1:56
4.	"Father Figures"	3:32
5.	"Apple Tree Me" (featuring C.S. Armstrong)	1:38
6.	"Red" (featuring Evidence)	3:44
7.	"Secrets & Escapes"	3:04
8.	"De La Kufi" (featuring Talib Kweli)	3:13
9.	"Red Light Zone"	3:11
10.	"The Idhin"	1:47
11.	"They Shot Ricky"	2:21
Total length:		'32:55

== Personnel ==
Credits are adapted from the album's back cover.

=== Musicians ===
- Brother Ali – vocals
- Evidence – production; vocals on "Red"
- Pharoahe Monch – vocals on "Situated"
- C.S. Armstrong – vocals on "Apple Tree Me"
- Talib Kweli – vocals on "De La Kufi"

=== Technical ===
- Brother Ali – recording, engineering
- Evidence – recording, engineering
- Chris Pummill – additional recording for Pharoahe Monch and Talib Kweli
- Eddie Sancho – mixing
- Joe LaPorta – mastering
- Brother Ali (Ali Newman) – executive production
- Evidence (Michael Perretta) – executive production
- Sean Daley – executive production
- Brent Sayers – executive production

=== Artwork and coordination ===
- Mustafa Davis – cover photography
- Alex Everson – design and layout
- Jordon Daley – project coordination
- Jason Cook – project coordination
- Darien Washington – project coordination
