= Crusades (album) =

Studio album by The Plastic Constellations
- Released: 2006
- Recorded: July 2005
- Studios: The Hideaway (Minneapolis, MN)
- Genre: Rock
- Length: 34:36
- Label: Frenchkiss

The Plastic Constellations chronology
Mazatlan (2004)	Crusades (2006)	We Appreciate You (2008)

Professional ratings
Review scores
Source	Rating
AllMusic	3.5/5 stars
Drowned in Sound	7/10
Pitchfork	7.8/10
PopMatters	5/10

Crusades is the third full-length studio album by American indie rock band the Plastic Constellations. It was released in 2006 through Frenchkiss Records, marking the group's first album for the label.

== Track listing ==
No.	Title	Length
1.	"Phoenix and the Faultline"	2:56
2.	"Iron City Jungles"	3:50
3.	"Best Things"	3:47
4.	"Quixote"	3:15
5.	"Sancho Panza"	3:32
6.	"Belly of the Beast"	3:38
7.	"Men in Dark Times"	3:47
8.	"Reunitiation"	2:02
9.	"Ghost in the House"	3:57
10.	"Bring What You Bring"	3:52
Total length:		34:36

== Personnel ==
- Aaron "Lazerbeak" Mader – performer
- Jeff Allen – performer
- Jordan Roske – performer
- Matt Scharenbroich – performer, painting
- Stefon "P.O.S" Alexander – backing vocals
- Joe Mabbott – mixing
- Bruce Templeton – mastering
- Dave Gardner – mastering
- Alison Allen – design
- Julie Vermeer – design
