= Advice from the Happy Hippopotamus =

Studio album by Cloud Cult
- Released: June 2005
- Genre: Indie pop, folk, experimental rock
- Label: Earthology, Baria

Cloud Cult chronology
Aurora Borealis (2004)	Advice from the Happy Hippopotamus (2005)	The Meaning of 8 (2007)

Professional ratings
Review scores
Source	Rating
All Music	4/5 stars
Pitchfork Media	(8.3/10)

Advice from the Happy Hippopotamus is an album by American music group Cloud Cult, released in June 2005 by Earthology Records.

The song "Lucky Today" was used in an advertising campaign for Esurance that showed the band performing the song while sitting on clouds.

== Track listing ==
All songs written by Craig Minowa.

1. "Intro" – 3:03
2. "Living on the Outside of Your Skin" – 3:06
3. "Happy Hippo" – 2:40
4. "What Comes at the End" – 3:57
5. "You Got Your Bones to Make a Beat" – 3:01
6. Untitled – 0:26
7. "Washed Your Car" – 1:59
8. "Transistor Radio" – 4:08
9. "What It Feels Like to Be Alive" – 0:51
10. "Moving to Canada" – 3:06
11. "Start New" – 1:43
12. "Car Crash" – 2:55
13. "Light at the End of the Tunnel" 2:45
14. "Million Things" – 2:36
15. "Can't Stop the Journey Now" – 3:24
16. "Clip-Clop" – 2:30
17. "Training Wheels" – 4:04
18. "We Made Up Your Mind for You" – 2:23
19. "That Man Jumped Out the Window" – 3:46
20. Untitled – 0:31
21. "Lucky Today" – 2:10
22. Untitled – 1:04
23. "Rockwell" – 4:20
24. Untitled – 0:31
25. "Bobby's Spacesuit" – 3:02
