= Love & Service =

Studio album by Brother Ali
- Released: April 26, 2024
- Genre: Hip hop
- Producer: unJUST

Brother Ali chronology
Brother Minutester Vol. 1 (2021)	Love & Service (2024)	Satisfied Soul (2025)

Love & Service is a studio album by American rapper Brother Ali and producer unJUST, released on April 26, 2024. The album is Brother Ali's first full-length project in several years, following a run of singles released in the months leading up to the album.

== Background and production ==
The album was produced entirely by unJUST, a producer associated with the Hieroglyphics crew, who built the record's sound around samples pulled from 1970s and 1980s educational children's programming, using an ASR-10 sampler. Brother Ali promoted the release with a string of singles beginning in February 2024, starting with "Ottomans" and followed by several others ahead of the album's arrival. The project was also accompanied by an animated film built around several of the album's songs.

== Guest appearances ==
Love & Service features guest appearances from Aesop Rock, Roc Marciano, Casual, Quelle Chris, and poet Rakaya Esime Fetuga.

== Reception ==
RapReviews described the album as continuing Brother Ali's established format while noting the unusual sampling concept behind unJUST's production, highlighting opening track "Chapter 1" for blending spiritual and thematic elements that set up the album's title.

HotNewHipHop framed the release within Ali's standing as a veteran, underappreciated lyricist, calling attention to the strength of the featured guest list as a sign of the record's ambitions.

Smaller outlets were largely positive as well. UndergroundHipHopBlog called unJUST's production "warm" and highlighted the album's exploration of themes including God, death, and empire, though the reviewer noted it wasn't among their favorite Brother Ali projects. Cyphersessions' "A Week's Worth Album Review" praised the record's consistency, describing it as an album meant to help listeners reflect on daily life.

== Track listing ==
All tracks were written by Brother Ali and produced by unJUST.

Love & Service track listing
No.	Title	Length
1.	"Chapter 1" (featuring Rakaya Esime Fetuga)	1:23
2.	"Ottomans"	2:52
3.	"Awaken"	3:15
4.	"The Collapse"	3:32
5.	"Manic" (featuring Casual and Aesop Rock)	4:04
6.	"Nom de Plume"	2:56
7.	"Cadillac"	2:56
8.	"Gauntlet" (featuring Roc Marciano)	3:46
9.	"Howlin' Wolf"	2:41
10.	"Ghosts" (featuring Quelle Chris)	3:35
11.	"Love & Service"	3:50
12.	"Worthy"	4:04
13.	"Inside"	2:55

== Personnel ==
- Ali "Brother Ali" Newman – vocals, writing
- Justin "unJUST" Herman – production, illustration, animation, arrangement
- Aesop Rock, Roc Marciano, Casual, Quelle Chris, Rakaya Esime Fetuga – featured performers
