= The Undisputed Truth (Brother Ali album) =

Studio album by Brother Ali
- Released: April 10, 2007
- Recorded: 2006–2007
- Genre: Hip hop
- Length: 61:20
- Labels: Rhymesayers; Warner Music Group
- Producer: Ant

Brother Ali chronology
Champion EP (2004)	The Undisputed Truth (2007)	The Truth Is Here (2009)

Singles from The Undisputed Truth
- 1. "Truth Is" Released: January 5, 2007; 2. "Uncle Sam Goddamn" Released: May 4, 2007

Professional ratings
Review scores
Source	Rating
About	4.5/5 stars
Allmusic	4/5 stars
The A.V. Club	B+
DJBooth	B+
HipHopDX	5/5 stars
Pitchfork Media	(6.6/10)
PopMatters	(6/10)
Rapreviews	(9/10)
Stylus Magazine	B+

The Undisputed Truth is the third studio album by American hip hop artist Brother Ali, his second major release. It was released on April 10, 2007, on Rhymesayers Entertainment. The album is produced entirely by Ant of Atmosphere. The first single, "Truth Is", was released on January 5, 2007. The second single is "Uncle Sam Goddamn" which was released on May 4, 2007.

== Promotion ==
In the period of promotion before the release of the album, several videos were released of various hip hop icons talking about Brother Ali and this upcoming album. In one video, Slug from Atmosphere is shown getting a tattoo while praising Ali and the new album; at the end of the video, the camera reveals that he has just had the title of the album tattooed in large letters across the side of his neck. (the tattoo however was not real, since it does not appear on his neck in interviews or live performances following the release of that video)

== Popular culture ==
The song "Whatcha Got" is featured in the EA Sports video game Madden 08.

== Controversy ==
Before the preparation for touring for the album, Brother Ali was invited to a Verizon sponsored tour with Gym Class Heroes. However, Brother Ali then released the music video for "Uncle Sam Goddamn". Due to the song's content, which included him being critical of the United States government, Verizon ultimately withdrew its sponsorship of Ali, causing him to truncate parts of his 2007 tour.

== Sales ==
The album debuted at number 69 on the U.S. Billboard 200, selling about 11,000 copies in its first week.

== Track listing ==
No.	Title	Length
1.	"Whatcha' Got"	4:33
2.	"Lookin' at Me Sideways"	4:05
3.	"Truth Is"	4:20
4.	"The Puzzle"	3:24
5.	"Pedigree"	3:36
6.	"Daylight"	4:01
7.	"Freedom Ain't Free"	3:36
8.	"Letter from the Government"	4:02
9.	"Here"	4:00
10.	"Listen Up" (featuring Whipper Whip)	5:03
11.	"Take Me Home"	5:01
12.	"Uncle Sam Goddamn"	4:57
13.	"Walking Away"	3:58
14.	"Faheem"	2:49
15.	"Ear to Ear"	3:47

== Awards ==
- 2007 HipHopDX Awards
  - "Slept On Album of the Year" (nominated)
