= Cloud Cult =

American rock band

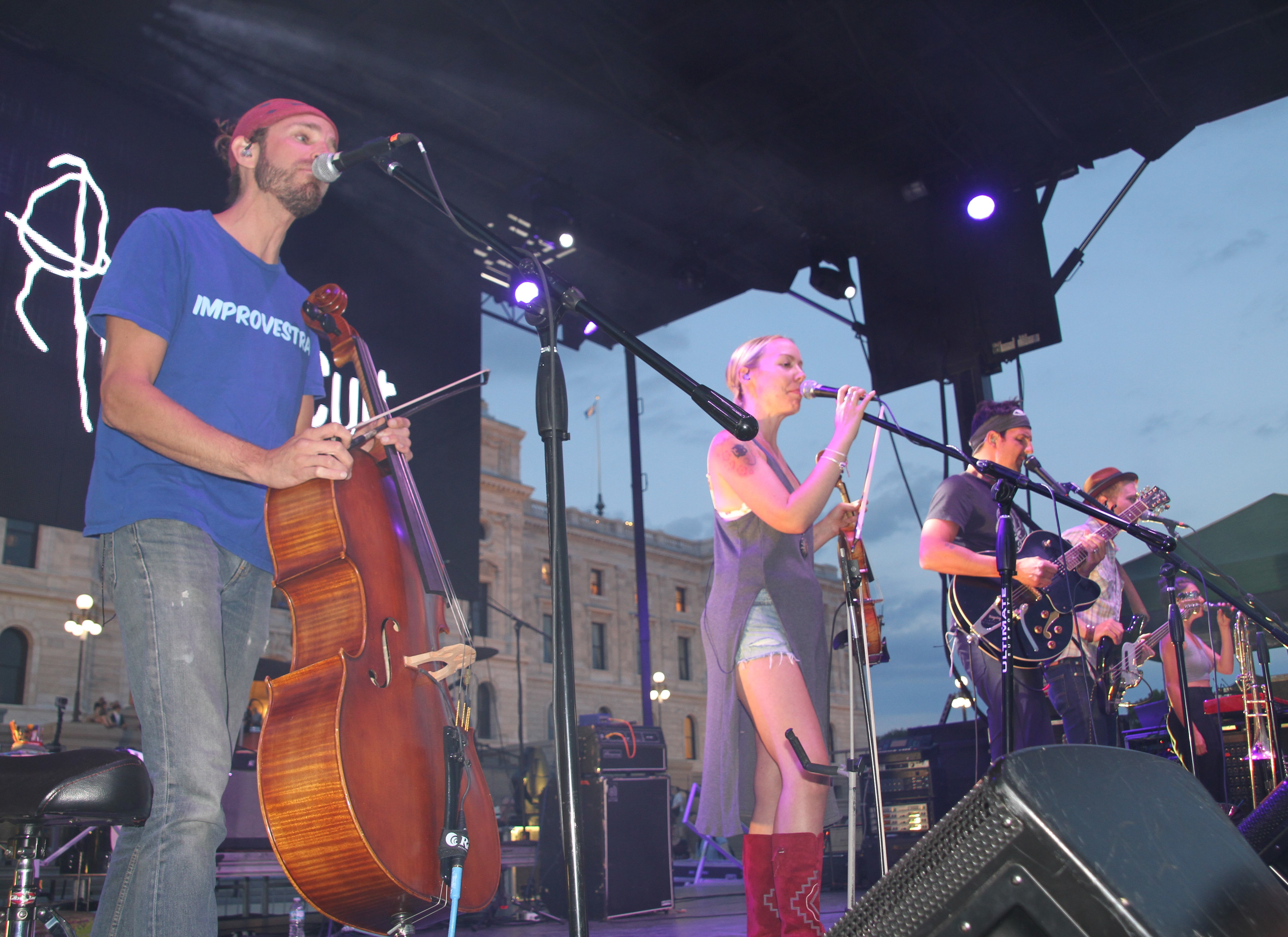
- Cloud Cult in 2017

Background information
- Origin: Minneapolis, Minnesota, U.S.
- Genres: Art rock, experimental rock, indie folk, indie pop, baroque pop
- Years active: 1995–present
- Labels: Earthology, Baria
- Members: Craig Minowa; Shawn Neary; Shannon Frid-Rubin; Sarah Elhardt-Perbix; Scott West; Dan Zamzow; Jeremy Harvey
- Past members: Connie Minowa; Arlen Peiffer; Martin Begue; Eduardo Vaz; Mara Stemm; Matthew Freed; Dan Greenwood; Sarah Young
- Website: http://www.cloudcult.com

Cloud Cult is an experimental indie rock band from Minneapolis, Minnesota, United States, led by singer-songwriter Craig Minowa. The name originated from the ancient prophecies of indigenous North Americans.

== History ==
Cloud Cult developed in 1995 as Craig Minowa recruited several other artists to contribute to his solo recordings. The band's early work earned Cloud Cult several offers from record labels, but all were rejected in favor of self-publishing. As they began to play live, one of their show's most distinctive features was the live painting by Connie Minowa and Scott West: over the course of a show they each completed a painting to be auctioned off at the end.

In 1997, lead singer Craig Minowa formed Earthology Records on his organic farm, powered by geothermal energy and built partially from reclaimed wood and recycled plastic. This nonprofit label uses only recycled materials and donates all profits to environmental charities. The band also tours in a biodiesel van.

In 2002, shortly after the unexpected death of his two-year-old son Kaidin, Minowa wrote songs to deal with the loss. They Live on the Sun was finished in 2003 and went to No. 1 on college radio station charts across the country. In January 2004, Cloud Cult added Mara Stemm on bass and released Aurora Borealis just six months later. The album was nominated by the Minnesota Music Awards as "Album of the Year" along with Prince and Paul Westerberg. With a van covered in solar panels, the band began touring nationally. In 2005 Cloud Cult released Advice from the Happy Hippopotamus, which Pitchfork Media called "insane genius" and rated the album with an 8.3. The Denver Post ranked the 2007 release The Meaning of 8 as one of the top ten albums of the past decade, along with bands like Modest Mouse, The Flaming Lips and Radiohead.

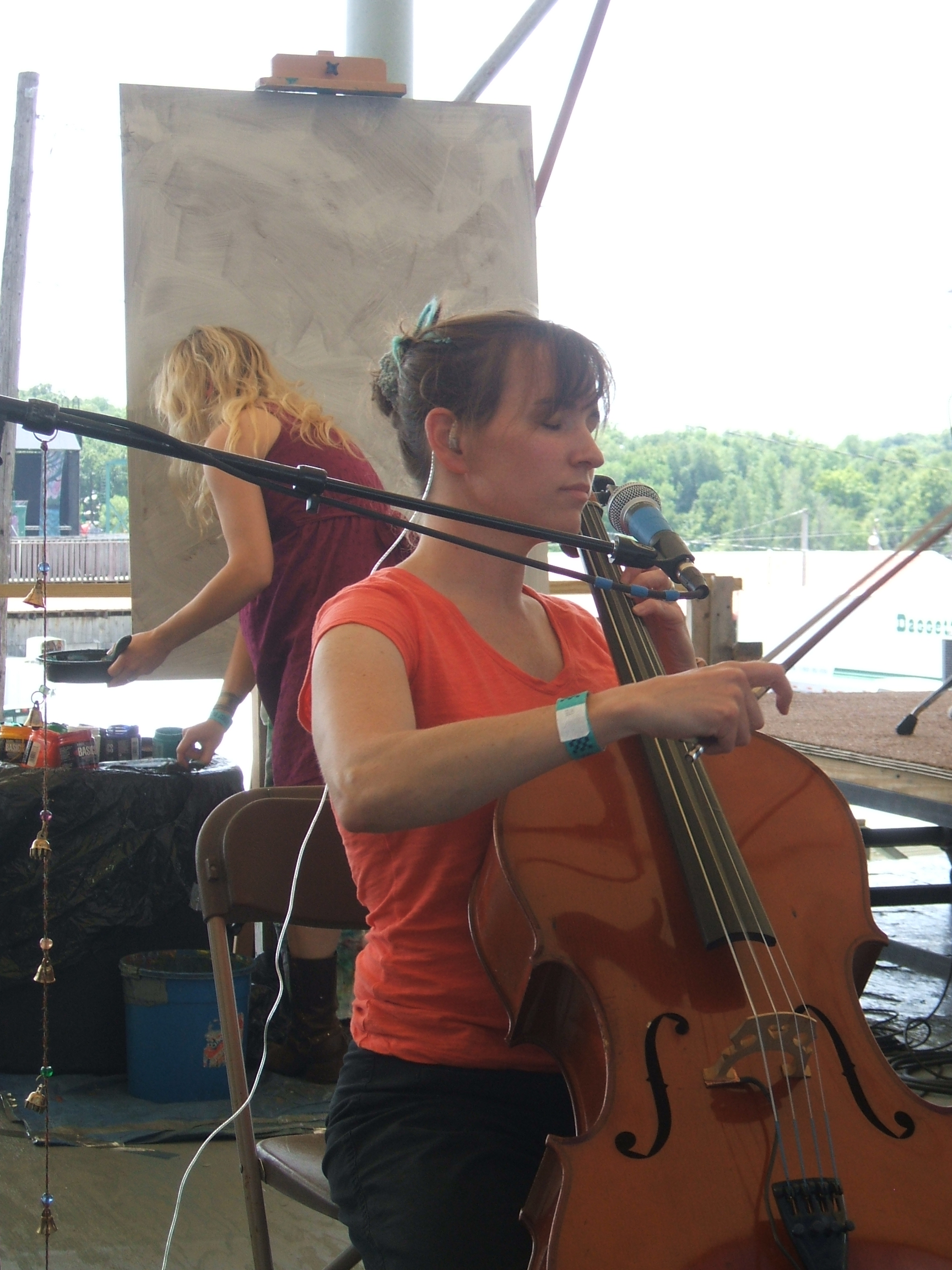
Sarah Young and Connie Minowa (background) perform during the 10,000 Lakes Festival in 2009.

Cloud Cult released a new album entitled Feel Good Ghosts (Tea-Partying Through Tornadoes) on April 8, 2008. The album was recorded and produced at Minowa's small organic farm in Northern Minnesota. "The place is so far out in the boonies, you can barely find it, because it's not on the maps," said Dan Montalto, an MTV Producer who brought a camera crew to the farm to film a short MTV feature on the band.

Craig said that this might be the final Cloud Cult album: "I don't think there's going to be another Cloud Cult album for a while. It could be never, I don't know." The band's website said that "the band plans to take a short respite to focus on family in the latter part of 2008 and into 2009." In October 2008, Cloud Cult was featured in an animated Esurance commercial. The band is shown playing the song "Lucky Today" while floating on clouds. This and other songs are available for free downloads on the Esurance website.

In the spring of 2009, Cloud Cult released "No One Said It Would Be Easy" a full-length documentary about the band, on DVD. The film was later released as a direct download.

At Coachella 2009, Craig revealed that Connie would not be performing because she was "not feeling well.... she's pregnant." They continued to tour and appeared for the second year straight at the "St Johns Block Party" outdoors in front of over 7,000 fans in Rochester, Minnesota.

The band announced a break beginning August 23, 2009 for Connie and Craig's baby. They resumed playing regionally in late spring 2010 and nationally in fall 2010.

In the spring of 2010, Cloud Cult became a contributing artist to Think Out Loud, a compilation album serving the homeless in the Twin Cities. In early 2010, the band announced that it would release a new album entitled Light Chasers, with the intended release date being September 14, 2010. Despite these plans, the album in its entirety leaked to the internet in early July 2010. The lead single for the album, "Running With The Wolves" was released in April 2010 and received local and national radio play. The band toured nationally in support of the album.

In spring 2011, Cloud Cult music was featured in a commercial on BBC America for Petrobras, a Brazilian energy company. In summer 2011, Cloud Cult played at the St. John's Block Party in Rochester, MN; the first band to play three times at the St. John's Block Party. There Craig announced he and Connie were expecting.

On May 4, 2012 after an 8-month hiatus, Cloud Cult announced a surprise show at the University of Wisconsin–River Falls campus, about 40 minutes away from the Twin Cities. This was the start of a stream of shows following the birth of Craig and Connie's baby. Another Cloud Cult album came in the summer of 2012, titled Lost Songs from the Lost Years, a ten-year anthology of previously unreleased work from Minowa.

Their song, "You Were Born", was played on How I Met Your Mother in "The Magician's Code" episode.

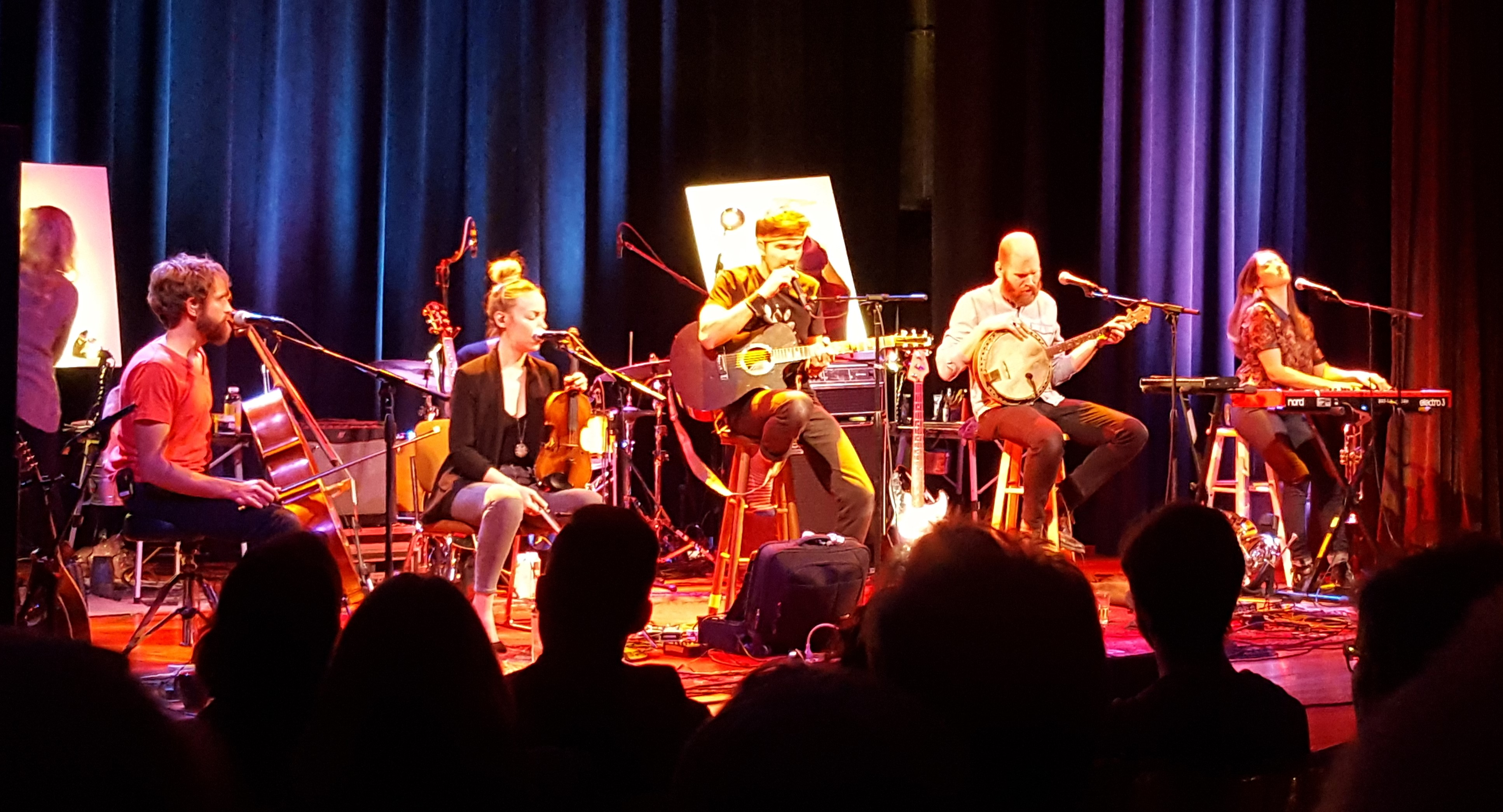
Cloud Cult performs at the Stoughton Opera House in Stoughton, Wisconsin on November 19, 2016.

On April 25, 2012 Cloud Cult said, "Working on the new album. About 9 songs in so far..." On October 1, 2012 they said, "We've been hammering on the new album for a couple of years now, but we're getting to the final phases of recording the project." On November 17, that year, Cloud Cult said, "Thanks to Greg Calbi for mastering Cloud Cult's new full length album this week out in NYC. The album is now finished, and this final touch is exactly what it needed." One new song is called, "Good Good Friend" that will be on the new album. The lyrics go, "We are not broken ones, just shattered pieces of the same bright sun, trying to figure out which way to run and we can't do this alone".

On December 7, Cloud Cult announced that their ninth studio album, Love, would be released on March 5, 2013. In addition to this announcement, the band also premiered a video for the first single from the album, "All the Things We Couldn't See," which will be the fifth track on the 13-song album.

Cloud Cult released their 10th studio album entitled The Seeker on February 12, 2016. The concept album was accompanied by a feature film of the same name. During the last several months of 2015, Cloud Cult created a pre-release campaign through Pledge Music to promote their new record. Throughout this campaign, the band released one song per week to supporters crowd-funding the effort, along with a corresponding clip from the film and a message from Craig Minowa. The film runs 70 minutes and follows the story of a young girl through her personal journey of grief and healing. It was directed by a friend of Minowa's, Jeff D. Johnson of Motion 117 Productions, and shot in rural Wisconsin over three weeks. Josh Radnor of How I Met Your Mother and Alex McKenna star.

Composed during the COVID pandemic, the album Metamorphosis was released in March 2022. In July 2024, the band announced the release of their 12th album Alchemy Creek which will be released on August 8 on Earthology Records.

== Awards ==
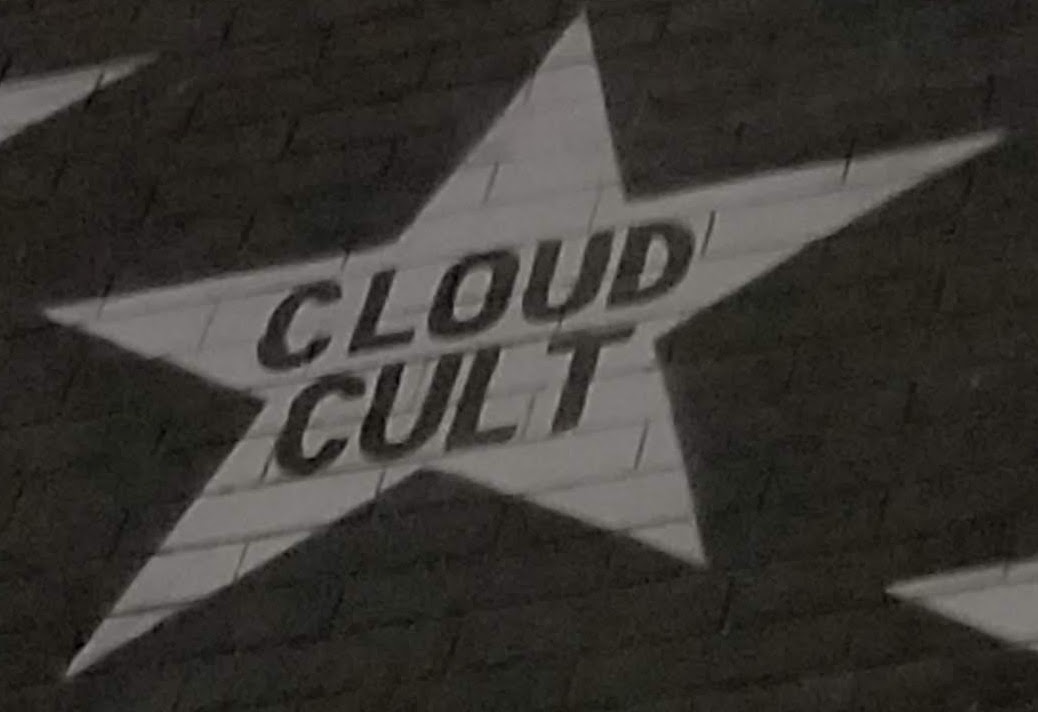
Cloud Cult's star on the outside mural of the Minneapolis nightclub First Avenue

Minnesota Music Awards 2004: "Artist of the year" for the studio album Aurora Borealis.

Cloud Cult has been honored with a star on the outside mural of the Minneapolis nightclub First Avenue, recognizing performers that have played sold-out shows or have otherwise demonstrated a major contribution to the culture at the iconic venue. Receiving a star "might be the most prestigious public honor an artist can receive in Minneapolis," according to journalist Steve Marsh.

== Band members ==
Current

- Craig Minowa – Singer-songwriter, guitar
- Jeremy Harvey – drums
- Shannon Frid-Rubin – violin
- Daniel Zamzow – cello
- Shawn Neary – bass guitar, trombone, banjo
- Sarah Elhardt-Perbix – keyboard, French horn, trumpet
- Scott West – visual artist, trumpet

Former

- Connie Minowa – visual artist
- Sarah Young – cello
- Dan Greenwood – drums
- Mara Stemm – bass guitar
- Matthew Freed – bass guitar
- Martin Begue
- Eduardo Vaz – drums
- Adrian Grote/Young
- Arlen Peiffer – drums

== Discography ==
=== Studio albums ===
Title	Album details	Peak chart positions				
Title	Album details	US	US Alt.	US Heat	US Indie	US Rock
The Shade Project	Released: 1995; Label(s): Self-released	—	—	—	—	—
Who Killed Puck?	Released: June 5, 2001; Label(s): Earthology/The Orchard	—	—	—	—	—
They Live on the Sun	Released: July 7, 2003; Label(s): Earthology/The Orchard	—	—	—	—	—
Aurora Borealis	Released: June 22, 2004; Label(s): Earthology	—	—	—	—	—
Advice from the Happy Hippopotamus	Released: June 2005; Label(s): Earthology	—	—	—	—	—
The Meaning of 8	Released: April 10, 2007; Label(s): Earthology	—	—	—	—	—
Feel Good Ghosts (Tea-Partying Through Tornadoes)	Released: April 8, 2008; Label(s): Earthology	—	—	24	—	—
Light Chasers	Released: June 28, 2010; Label(s): Earthology	—	—	9	47	—
Love	Released: March 5, 2013; Label(s): Earthology	57	12	—	9	18
The Seeker	Released: February 12, 2016; Label(s): Earthology	—	—	—	—	—
Metamorphosis	Released: March 4, 2022; Label(s): Earthology	—	—	—	—	—
Alchemy Creek	Released: August 8, 2024; Label(s): Earthology	—	—	—	—	—
"—" denotes album that did not chart or was not released

=== EPs ===
- Running With the Wolves – EP (2010)

=== Live albums ===
- Unplug (April 2014)

=== Compilation albums ===
- Lost Songs from the Lost Years (2002)
- Lost Songs from the Lost Years [Limited Re-Release] (2009)
- Think Out Loud: Music Serving The Homeless In The Twin Cities (2010)
- Minnesota Beatle Project, Vol. 3 (2011)
- MN Music 4 MN Kids: A Benefit For Children's Hospitals And Clinics Of Minnesota, Vol. 1 (2011)

=== Films ===
- No One Said It Would Be Easy – A Film About Cloud Cult (2009)
- Unplug: The Film
- The Seeker

=== Television shows ===
- How I Met Your Mother: Season 7 – The Magician' s Code Part 1 (2012) – "You Were Born"
- Cougar Town: Season 5 – Episode 12 – Love Is a Long Road (2014) – "Good Friend"
- The Blacklist : Season 2 - Episode 5 – "The Front" (2014) – "You Were Born"
- Young Sheldon : Season 4 - Episode 12 – "A Box of Treasure and the Meemaw of Science" (2020) – "There's so much Energy in us"

=== Best of, live, remixes ===
- On Live at KEXP, Volume III is a live version of "Mr. Tambourine Man" (Bob Dylan cover). A studio cut is available on Spinout Record's Duluth Does Dylan Revisited, a compilation of Bob Dylan covers that reflects how the local music culture has been influenced by being the birthplace of the music icon. The studio cut is also available on the new Lost Songs from the Lost Year album released in 2009, and is a track on the EP Running with the Wolves.
- On Live Current Volume 3 there is a live recording of the track "Pretty Voice", which can also be found on 89.3 The Current's YouTube channel.
