= Shadows on the Sun =

Studio album by Brother Ali
- Released: May 2, 2003
- Genre: Hip hop
- Length: 65:54
- Label: Rhymesayers Entertainment
- Producer: Ant

Brother Ali chronology
Rites of Passage (2000)	Shadows on the Sun (2003)	Champion EP (2004)

Professional ratings
Review scores
Source	Rating
AllMusic	4.5/5 stars
HipHopDX	5/5
Pitchfork	8.7/10
RapReviews	9/10
Sputnikmusic	4/5
Tiny Mix Tapes	4.5/5
The Village Voice	A−

Shadows on the Sun is the second studio album by American rapper Brother Ali. It was released on May 2, 2003, on Rhymesayers Entertainment. It was produced entirely by Ant of Atmosphere. The album received almost unanimous critical acclaim.

== Track listing ==
All tracks by Brother Ali & Ant except 7 and 14 by the formers and Slug

No.	Title	Length
1.	"Room with a View"	3:50
2.	"Champion..."	4:06
3.	"Star Quality"	5:20
4.	"Prince Charming"	4:35
5.	"Win Some Lose Some"	3:24
6.	"Pay Them Back"	2:53
7.	"Blah Blah Blah" (featuring Slug)	4:20
8.	"Shadows on the Sun"	4:36
9.	"Prelude"	1:17
10.	"Forest Whitiker"	3:00
11.	"Bitchslap!"	3:19
12.	"Back Stage Pacin'"	3:51
13.	"When the Beat Comes In"	4:31
14.	"Missing Teeth" (featuring Slug)	1:54
15.	"Dorian"	3:50
16.	"Soul Whisper"	1:49
17.	"Picket Fence"	5:10
18.	"Victory! (Come Forward)"	4:09

== Personnel ==
Credits for Shadows on the Sun adapted from Allmusic.

- Ant – Scratching, Engineer, Executive Producer, Mixing, Beats
- Brother Ali – Vocals, Engineer, Executive Producer, Mixing
- Sean Daley – Executive Producer
- Emily Lazar – Mastering
- Joe Mabbott – Engineer, Mixing
- Dan Monick – Photography
- Brent "Abu Siddiq" Sayers – Executive Producer
- Siddiq – Design, Layout Design

== In popular culture ==
Shadows on the Sun's third track, Star Quality, is used in the soundtrack for the online game The Campaign Trail, and in particular, a mod on its loader, Obamanation.
