= Heiruspecs =

American hip-hop group

- Origin: Saint Paul, Minnesota, United States
- Genre: Hip-hop
- Years active: 1997 – present
- Labels: Razor & Tie, Interlock
- Members: Felix; Muad'dib; Twinkie Jiggles dVRG; Peter Leggett; Josh Peterson
- Website: http://www.heiruspecs.com/

Heiruspecs (/ˈhaɪ.ruˌspɛks/) is a live hip-hop band based in the Midway neighborhood of Saint Paul, Minnesota. Their name is a deliberate misspelling of the word haruspex, which is a Roman term for a person trained to practice divination from the inspection of entrails.

The band's first releases Live from the Studio, and Antidisestablishmetabolism are out-of-print, though a compilation featuring songs from them was released as 10 Years Strong in December 2007. Their self-titled album Heiruspecs was released on December 13, 2008. On April 22, 2014, the band released Night Falls.

In contrast to many contemporary hip-hop groups that use sampling and turntables, Heiruspecs emphasize a raw, live sound celebrating their roots, and local music scene, and are more known for their live performances than records. They do shows with Minnesota-local hip-hop label Rhymesayers Entertainment, and the group's style has been compared to the live hip-hop band The Roots. They have a very upbeat sound and at one point were typically on tour for at least half of the year. The band has since stayed closer to the Twin Cities and band members have picked up day jobs.

== History ==
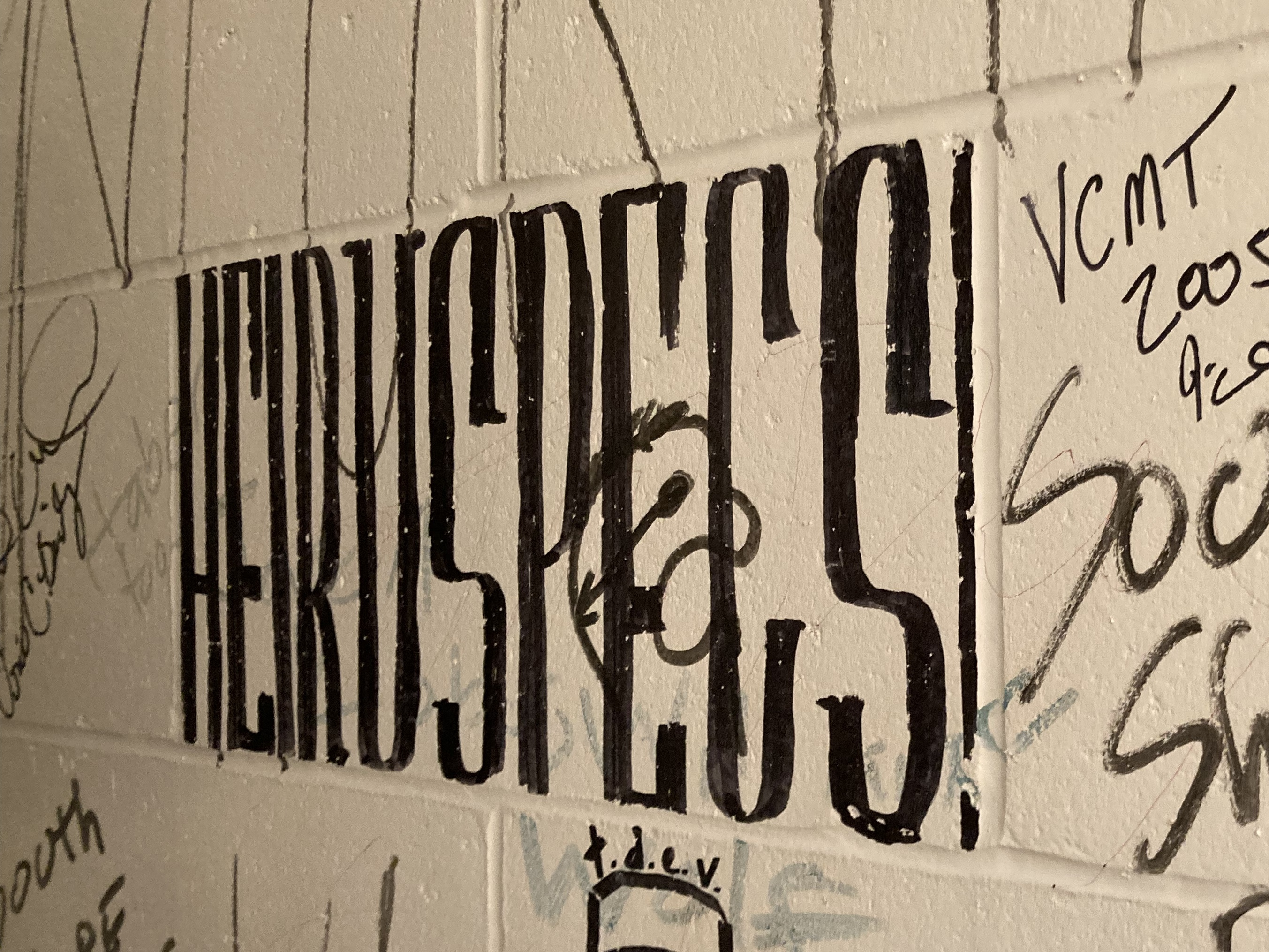
Signed green room wall at Grinnell College's Harris Center

Heiruspecs formed in 1997 when the members were attending St. Paul Central High School. They met while taking a studio recording arts program there. Sean (Twinkie Jiggles) would play bass while four or five drummers would rotate in and out of freestyle sessions, and Felix would rhyme throughout the whole process. Early Heiruspecs music contained trombone and saxophone, but these were absent on Small Steps and A Tiger Dancing. In 2004 Heiruspecs was named the best live artist in the Twin Cities by City Pages. Reviewing A Tiger Dancing for CMJ New Music Monthly, Owen Strock wrote that "Heiruspecs are smart enough to keep James Brown's advice close to heart—they always make it funky."

In commemoration of 10 years of St. Paul pride and good Hip Hop music, St. Paul Mayor Chris Coleman declared December 22 Heiruspecs Day in Saint Paul, Minnesota.

Heiruspecs took an unofficial hiatus after their tour van was totaled in 2005. Heiruspecs was released in 2008 at a point when the band began touring less.

In summer 2010, the band was in the studio working on a new album.

On December 23, 2022, the group released a new album, Pretty Random But What Happened To the Heiruspecs.

Many of the band's concerts since 2010 have benefited charities including those in honor of Philando Castile and for students at Saint Paul Central.

== Members and former members ==
=== Current ===
- Felix (Chris Wilbourn) - Vocals
- Muad'dib (Jon Harrison) - Vocals, Beat Box
- Twinkie Jiggles (Sean McPherson) - Bass
- dVRG (DeVon Gray) - Keyboards
- Peter Leggett - Drums
- Josh Peterson - Guitar

=== Former ===
- Martin Devaney - Saxophone
- Bryan Alvarez - Trombone
- Alex Oftelie - Drums
- Al McIntosh - Trumpet
- Steve McPherson - Guitar
- Kevin Hunt - Drums
- Conor Meehan - Drums
- Tasha Baron - Keyboards
- Andy Thompson - Keyboards, Guitar
- Alex Danovitch - Keys
- Joshua Herbst - Drums
- Brett Bullion - Drums
- Noah Paster - Percussion, 808 pad
- Tim Glenn - Drums

== Discography ==
=== Studio albums ===
- Live from the Studio
- Antidisestablishmetabolism (2000)
- Small Steps (2002)
- A Tiger Dancing (2004)
- Heiruspecs (2008)
- Night Falls (2014)
- Pretty Random But What Happened To the Heiruspecs (2022)
- Four Were Wolves Forever Young (2023)

=== EPs ===
- Theskyisfalling (2016)

=== Compilation albums ===
- 10 Years Strong (2007)
- 20/20 (2017)
