= The Plastic Constellations =

US indie rock band

- Also known as: TPC
- Origin: Minneapolis, Minnesota
- Genres: Indie rock, post-hardcore
- Years active: 1996-2008; 2010
- Labels: Frenchkiss Records; 2024 Records; Modern Radio Records; Blood of the Young Records; Pretentious Records
- Members: Jordan Roske; Aaron Mader; Matt Scharenbroich; Jeff Allen

The Plastic Constellations was an indie rock band based in Minneapolis, Minnesota.

The band consisted of guitarists/vocalists Aaron Mader and Jeff Allen, bassist Jordan Roske, and drummer Matt Scharenbroich. Aaron Mader is also an underground hip hop producer, operating in this capacity as a founding member of the collective Doomtree, under the alias Lazerbeak.

== History ==
Formed in 1995 when they met as students at Hopkins High School, they played their first shows in 1996 at the First Avenue venue when they were 15 years old.

Their last show was April 19, 2008 at First Avenue before they went on what is being called an "indefinite hiatus."

A reunion show was held at The Cedar Cultural Center in Minneapolis on January 23, 2010.

The band has released four albums such as Let's War, Mazatlan, Crusades, and We Appreciate You.

== Discography ==
=== Albums ===
- Let's War (Modern Radio Record Label, 2000)
- Mazatlan (2024 Records, 2004)
- Crusades (Frenchkiss Records, 2006)
- We Appreciate You (Frenchkiss Records, 2008)

=== EP ===
- We Got The Movement (Pretentious Records, 1999)

=== Singles ===
- The Dreaming/The Smallest Skyline In The Sky (Pretentious Records, 1998)
