= A Tiger Dancing =

Studio album by Heiruspecs
- Released: September 28, 2004
- Genre: Hip-hop
- Length: 53:46
- Label: Razor & Tie

Heiruspecs chronology
Small Steps (2002)	A Tiger Dancing (2004)	Heiruspecs (2008)

Professional ratings
Aggregate scores
Source	Rating
Metacritic	78/100
Review scores
Source	Rating
AllMusic	3.5/5 stars
City Pages	(positive)
Hectic Eclectic	7.5/10 stars
PopMatters	(positive)
URB	3/5 stars

A Tiger Dancing is the third album by the hip-hop group Heiruspecs. It was released on September 28, 2004.

The song "5ves" appeared on the Harold & Kumar Go to White Castle soundtrack.

== Reception ==
Reviewing A Tiger Dancing for CMJ New Music Monthly, Owen Strock wrote that "Heiruspecs are smart enough to keep James Brown's advice close to heart—they always make it funky."

== Track listing ==
All tracks by Heiruspecs

1. "Something for Nothing" – 3:57
2. "Intro" – 1:19
3. "Two-Fold" – 4:13
4. "Dollar" – 3:08
5. "5ves" – 4:35
6. "A Tiger Dancing" – 2:28
7. "32 Months" – 2:05
8. "Swearsong" – 2:29
9. "I'm Behind You" – 3:49
10. "Fist" – 3:45
11. "Get Down" – 4:42
12. "It Takes" – 3:13
13. "Heartsprings" – 3:19
14. "Marching Orders" – 3:46
15. "Position of Strength" – 3:55
16. "Lie to Me" – 2:54
17. "Shout Outs" – 4:51

== Personnel ==
- Felix – vocals
- Heiruspecs – mixing
- Twinkie Jiggles – bass
- Peter Leggett – drums
- MuadDib – vocals, beatbox
- Josh Peterson – guitar
- DeVon "dVRG" Gray – keyboards
