= Champion (EP) =

Champion EP

EP by Brother Ali
- Released: May 11, 2004
- Studio: Trail Mix Recording Studios (Minneapolis, MN)
- Genre: Hip-hop
- Length: 39:06
- Label: Rhymesayers Entertainment
- Producer: Ant

Brother Ali chronology
Champion EP (2004)	The Truth Is Here (2009)

Professional ratings
Review scores
Source	Rating
HipHopDX	4.5/5
Prefix	8/10
RapReviews	8.5/10
Stylus	B+

Champion EP is the first extended play by American rapper Brother Ali. It was released on May 11, 2004 via Rhymesayers Entertainment. Recording sessions took place at Trail Mix Recording Studios in Minneapolis. Production was handled entirely by Ant, who also served as executive producer together with Brent Sayers, Brother Ali and Slug.

== Track listing ==
All lyrics are written by Jason Douglas Newman; all music is composed by Anthony Davis.

No.	Title	Length
1.	"Champion" (Remix)	4:42
2.	"Bad Ma Fucka"	4:27
3.	"Sleepwalker"	3:48
4.	"Love on Display"	3:28
5.	"Self Taught"	4:04
6.	"Heads Down (You Haven't Done That Yet)"	3:59
7.	"Chain Link"	4:25
8.	"Waheedah's Hands"	4:04
9.	"Rain Water"	6:09
Total length:		39:06

Notes

- Original version of "Champions" is taken from Shadows on the Sun.

== Personnel ==
- Jason "Brother Ali" Newman – vocals, executive producer
- Anthony "Ant" Davis – scratches, producer, executive producer
- Joe Mabbott – recording, mixing
- Gene Grimaldi – mastering
- Brent Sayers – executive producer
- Sean "Slug" Daley – executive producer
- George Thompson – artwork, design, layout
- Wes Winship – design, layout
- Jason "J-Bird" Cook – project coordinator
- Luke W. Demarte – legal
