= The Truth Is Here =

EP by Brother Ali
- Released: March 9, 2009
- Genre: Hip-hop
- Length: 34:07
- Label: Rhymesayers
- Producer: Ant

Brother Ali chronology
Champion EP (2004)	The Truth Is Here (2009)	The Bite Marked Heart (2012)

The Truth Is Here is the second extended play by American rapper Brother Ali. It was released on March 9, 2009 via Rhymesayers Entertainment. Produced by Ant, it features a lone guest appearance by Slug. In addition to 9 new songs, the EP contains a DVD of the June 8, 2007 live performance on First Avenue in Minneapolis from The Undeniable Truth tour with bonus commentary and music videos.

The album debuted at number 119 on the Billboard 200, number 69 on the Top R&B/Hip-Hop Albums and number 18 on the Independent Albums charts, with first-week sales of 4,825 copies in the United States.

== Critical reception ==
Professional ratings
Aggregate scores
Source	Rating
Metacritic	86/100
Review scores
Source	Rating
AllMusic	4/5 stars
HipHopDX	4/5
MSN Music	(2-star Honorable Mention)
Pitchfork	7.4/10
PopMatters	8/10
RapReviews	7.5/10
The Boston Phoenix	4/4 stars
Tom Hull	B+

The Truth Is Here was met with universal acclaim from music critics. At Metacritic, which assigns a normalized rating out of 100 to reviews from mainstream publications, the album received an average score of 86 based on six reviews.

Chris Faraone of The Boston Phoenix praised the album, calling it "his second perfect disc in that many years". Andrew Martin of PopMatters stated: "whether this is your first foray into Ali's catalog or you're already a seasoned fan, there is no reason to not check this out". Pedro Hernandez of RapReviews wrote: "the EP serves its purpose quite well as it gives fans just enough to keep you craving a Brother Ali full length, but holds back enough so they will appreciate the full length once it arrives". Nate Patrin of Pitchfork claimed: "no one aspect of Ali's personality really dominates. The Truth Is Here is all the stronger for it, and that can only be considered a good sign".

== Track listing ==
All lyrics are written by Jason Newman; all music is composed by Anthony Davis.

No.	Title	Length
1.	"Real As Can Be"	2:23
2.	"Philistine David"	3:28
3.	"Little Rodney"	4:27
4.	"Palm The Joker"	2:33
5.	"Good Lord"	4:11
6.	"Baby Don't Go"	4:01
7.	"Talkin' My Shit"	4:55
8.	"The Believers" (featuring Slug)	4:47
9.	"Begin Here"	3:22
10.	"DVD"
Total length:		34:07

== Personnel ==
- Jason "Brother Ali" Newman – lyrics, vocals, executive producer
- Sean "Slug" Daley – vocals (track 8)
- Sean McPherson – additional bass (tracks: 4, 5)
- Nate Collis – additional guitar and keyboards (track 6)
- Anthony "Ant" Davis – scratches, producer, executive producer
- Joe Mabbott – engineering, mixing
- Chris Gehringer – mastering
- Brent Sayers – executive producer, layout
- Daniel J. Valadez – artwork
- Adam Garcia – cover text
- Bo Hakala – director
- Ben Cohen – director, editor

== Charts ==
Chart (2009)	Peak position
US Billboard 200	119
US Top R&B/Hip-Hop Albums (Billboard)	69
US Independent Albums (Billboard)	18
