= Brother Ali =

American rapper (born 1977)

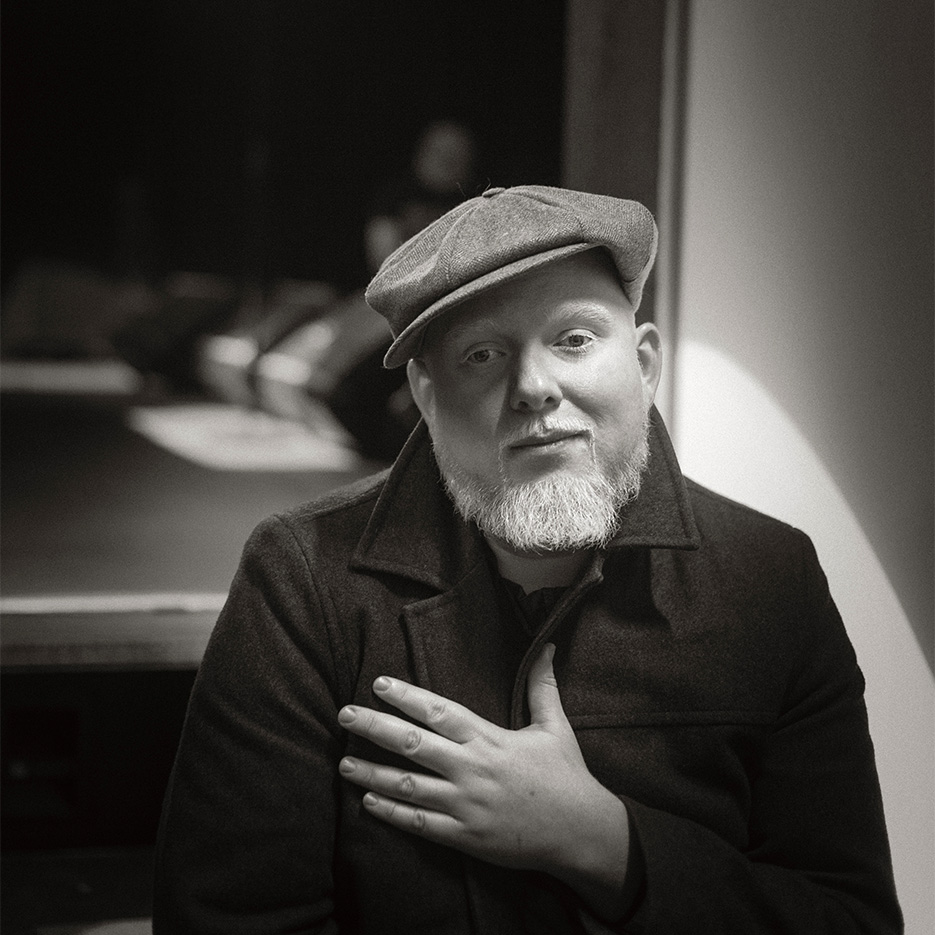
- Born: Jason Douglas Newman; July 30, 1977 (age 49); Madison, Wisconsin, U.S.
- Occupations: Rapper; producer; activist
- Musical career
- Origin: Minneapolis, Minnesota, U.S.
- Genres: Midwestern hip-hop; political hip-hop; conscious hip-hop
- Years active: 1994–present
- Labels: Rhymesayers; Warner Music Group; Travelers Media LLC; Mello Music Group
- Website: Brotherali.com

Signature
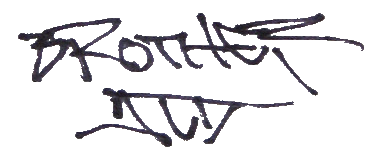

Ali Douglas Newman (born Jason Douglas Newman, July 30, 1977), better known by his stage name Brother Ali, is an American rapper, community activist, and member of the Rhymesayers Entertainment hip-hop collective. He has released eleven albums, four EPs, and a number of singles and collaborations. Some of his best known works include The Undisputed Truth (2007), Us (2009), and Mourning in America and Dreaming in Color (2012), all of which charted on the US Billboard and were favorably received by critics.

== Early life ==
Ali was born in Madison, Wisconsin. He has albinism, a condition characterized by the complete or partial absence of pigment in the skin, hair, and eyes. He moved with his family to Michigan for a few years and then settled in Minneapolis, Minnesota in 1992. He attended Robbinsdale Cooper High School in New Hope, Minnesota.

Ali is a White American, but he has spoken of feeling more accepted by Black classmates than white ones: "It's not like black kids didn't make fun of me, but it was different. It wasn't done in a way to exclude me. It wasn't done in a way to make me feel like not even a human being, not even a person." He could relate to them because they were also judged by their skin color.

Ali began rapping at age eight. He has stated that he was influenced by hip-hop culture at a very early age. In an interview with Huck magazine, he stated "Ever since I was a little kid, I've always been into hip-hop. I started beatboxing when I was about seven years old. Eventually, that led to me falling in love with the words." He has named Rakim, Chuck D, and KRS-One as early influences.

== Appearances ==
=== Television ===
On August 13, 2007, Brother Ali appeared on The Late Late Show and performed his single "Uncle Sam Goddamn" from The Undisputed Truth. On October 19, 2007, Ali appeared on Late Night with Conan O'Brien and performed "Take Me Home" from The Undisputed Truth. On December 16, 2009, Ali appeared on Late Night with Jimmy Fallon and was featured with late night band The Roots.

=== Podcasts ===
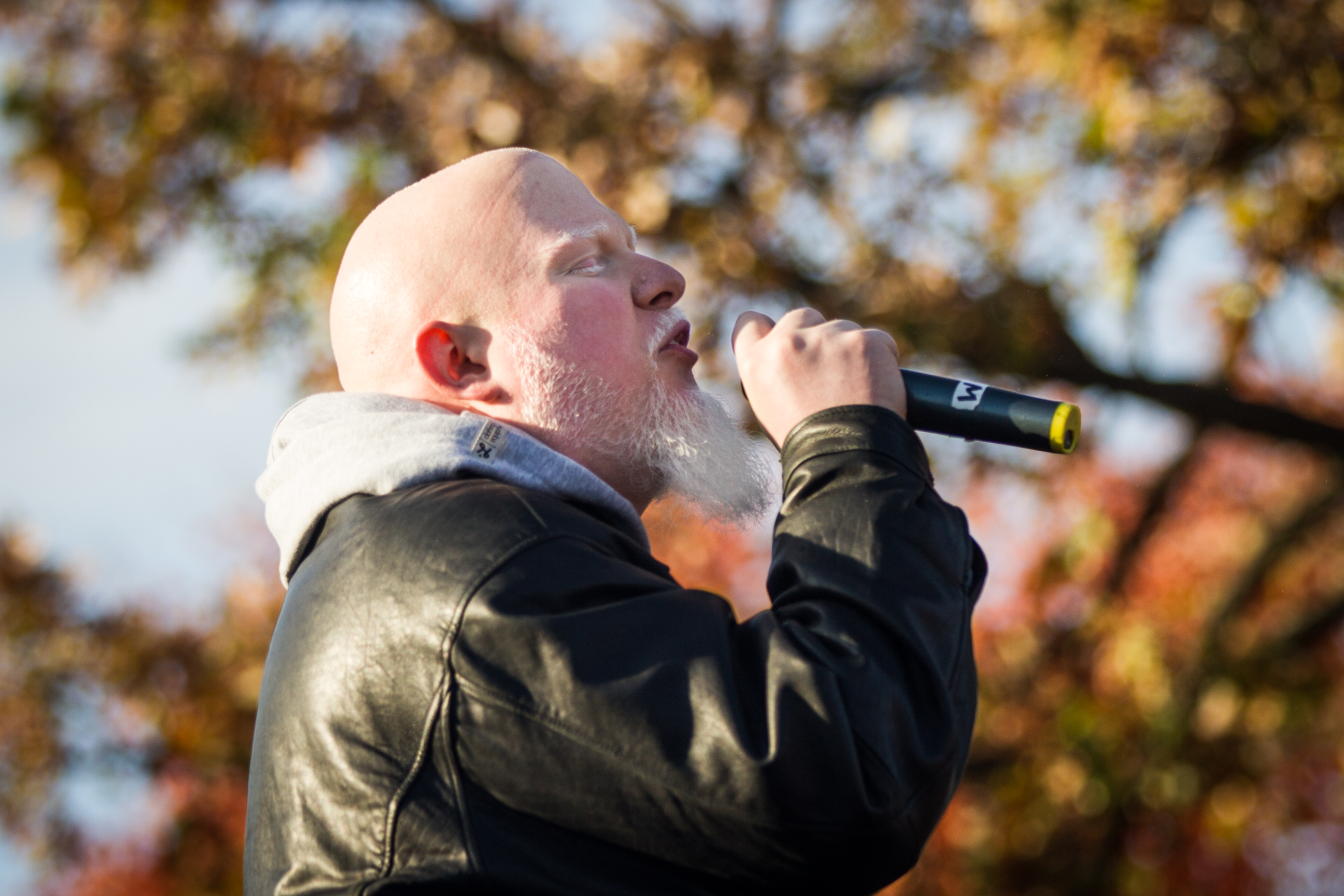
Brother Ali performing in 2012

On July 24, 2013, Brother Ali appeared on the Maximum Fun podcast Judge John Hodgman as an "Expert Witness".

On April 4, 2017, he appeared on The Combat Jack Show: "The Brother Ali Episode" and on October 19, 2017, on BuzzFeed's See Something Say Something podcast.

On April 5, 2018, he appeared on Max Fun's Heat Rocks podcast.

On January 1, 2023, he appeared on The Duncan Trussell Family Hour podcast.

=== Films ===
Ali appeared in Sacha Jenkins's 2018 documentary Word is Bond.

== Personal life ==
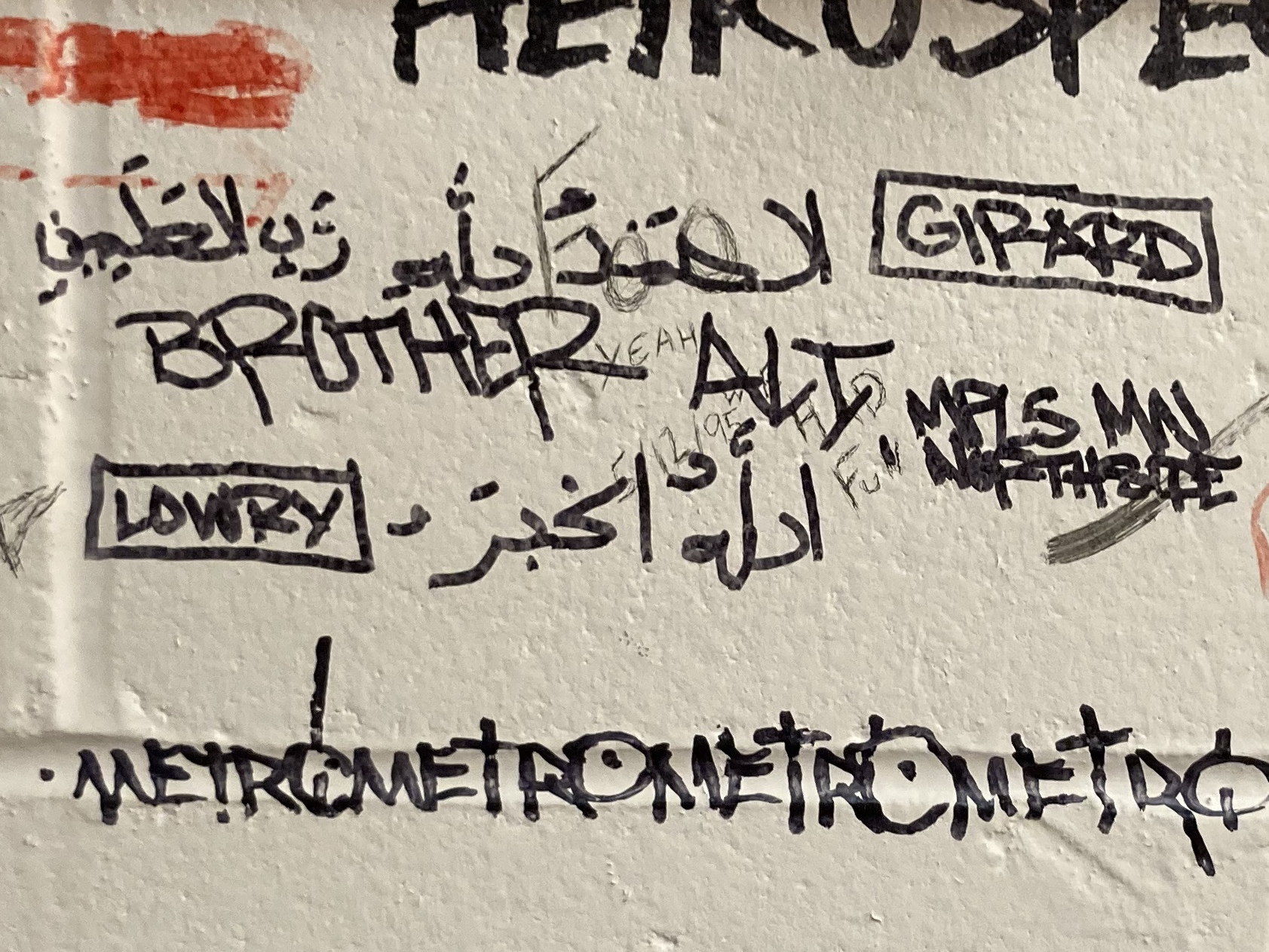
Autograph on green room wall at Grinnell College's Harris Center

Ali has a son, Faheem, from his first marriage. He is very private about his family and loved ones. His music frequently addresses his role as a father, parent, and husband. The song "Real As Can Be" off his 2009 EP The Truth Is Here refers to the impending birth of his daughter, and on the song "Fresh Air", which is on his 2009 album Us, he goes on to say "Just got married last year/ treated so good that it ain't even fair/ already got a boy, now the baby girl's here/ Bought us a house like the Berenstain Bears."

Ali often makes fun of the media's constant urge to mention his albinism in the first lines of their reviews or newspaper articles. He is also legally blind, a condition which is caused by his albinism.

In an article titled "The Art of Mourning in America", Brother Ali said his favorite food is sweet potato pie. The interview was conducted during the month of Ramadan and Ali performed a freestyle: "Lifelong starvation, every month is Ramadan / Walk in the crib and I'm surprised that the power's on."

Ali moved with his family to Istanbul around the time of the COVID-19 pandemic. He said the experience gave him a new respect for immigrants.

=== Religion ===
Ali converted to Islam at age 15 and followed Imam Warith Deen Mohammed. During this time, Ali was selected to join a group of students on a Malaysian study tour, in which they explored ways that a more liberal Islamic society could peacefully coexist with different religions.

Ali credits his conversion to Islam to KRS-One, whom he met during a lecture at age 13 at a local Minnesotan university. When asked about his faith, Ali stated, "KRS-ONE was actually the one who told me I should read Malcolm X. He assigned The Autobiography of Malcolm X to me; I read it, and that's what led to me becoming a Muslim."

== Activism ==
Many of Brother Ali's themes of social justice are incorporated into his lyrics, though he also takes part in activism outside of the music. He primarily focuses on themes of racial inequality, slavery, and critiquing the United States government, though overarching themes of hope, acceptance, and rising from sorrow are also often present. Much attention was garnered through Ali's album The Undisputed Truth, as it heavily criticized much about the United States' political system. After the music video for "Uncle Sam Goddamn" was released in 2007, it quickly gained much attention, and shortly after, the United States Department of Homeland Security froze a money transfer to his record label.

Ali has been a long-standing advocate for Palestinian liberation and has used his music to speak out against Israeli actions in Gaza and the West Bank. Following the events of October 7, 2023, he became more vocal on social media, posting a Palestinian flag and writing "[Palestinians] have been kicked out of their land, and they’ve been raped, slaughtered, and massacred, with all of the biggest governments in the world backing it up,” which he believes led to a significant professional backlash. Ali stated that his social media reach was "shadow-banned" and that a major distribution company "ghosted" him, abruptly canceling a deal to distribute his 2024 album Love & Service, which included the song "The Collapse" specifically about Gaza. This culminated in what he described as an unprecedented, year-long industry "blackout" where he did not perform a single paid show for the first time in his career, a period he directly links to "insisting on talking about the Palestinians".

In 2012, Ali was arrested along with thirty-seven others while occupying the home of a Minneapolis resident to fight the house's foreclosure. The goal of the protesters was to block the eviction of the family through their assembly and occupancy, but they were unsuccessful. Ali ended up using his platform as a celebrity to discuss these events, and bring them to the attention of his audience.

Ali deals heavily with the notion of privilege. He stated in an interview with Yes! magazine that "The best definition of privilege I've heard is anything you don't have to wrestle with, that you don't have to think about." Ali feels a certain obligation to act politically, as he is unwilling to sit aside after experiencing all he has. He states, "I feel like that's my job, and I feel like within the last few years I fully woke up to that, found the courage to understand that, and stepped out like that."

While performing at a concert in 2015, Brother Ali endorsed Bernie Sanders for president of the United States, as a candidate in the upcoming 2016 presidential election. He praised Sanders for saying "Black lives matter" at a presidential debate, a reference to the social movement. In November 2019, Brother Ali performed at a Bernie Sanders rally in Minneapolis, Minnesota, alongside Representative Ilhan Omar.

== Discography ==
=== Studio albums ===
Year	Album	Peak chart positions			
Year	Album	US	US R&B	US Rap	US Indie
2000	Rites of Passage: Released: April 28, 2000; Label: Rhymesayers; Format: CD, CS	—	—	—	—
2003	Shadows on the Sun: Released: May 2, 2003; Label: Rhymesayers; Format: CD, Digital Download, LP	—	—	—	—
2007	The Undisputed Truth: Released: April 10, 2007; Label: Rhymesayers, Warner Music Group; Format: CD, Digital Download, LP	69	48	—	6
2009	Us: Released: September 22, 2009; Label: Rhymesayers, Warner Music Group; Format: CD, Digital Download, LP	56	29	14	6
2012	Mourning in America and Dreaming in Color: Released: September 18, 2012; Label: Rhymesayers, Warner Music Group; Format: CD, Digital Download, LP	44	6	5	10
2017	All the Beauty in This Whole Life: Released: May 5, 2017; Label: Rhymesayers, Warner Music Group; Format: CD, Digital Download, LP	125	—	—	8
2019	Secrets & Escapes: Released: November 1, 2019; Label: Rhymesayers; Format: CD, Digital Download, LP	—	—	—	—
2024	Love & Service: Released: April 26, 2024; Label: Travelers Media LLC; Format: CD, Digital Download, LP	—	—	—	—
2025	Satisfied Soul: Released: February 14, 2025; Label: Mello Music Group; Format: CD, Digital Download, LP	—	—	—	—
"—" denotes releases that did not chart.

=== Mixtapes ===
Year	Album	Peak chart positions		
Year	Album	US	US R&B	US Indie
2007	Off the Record (with BK-One): Released: 2007; Label: Rhymesayers; Format: CD, Digital Download	—	—	—
2013	Left in the Deck: Released: September 5, 2013; Label: Rhymesayers; Format: CS, Digital Download	—	—	—
"—" denotes releases that did not chart.

=== EPs ===
Year	Album	Peak chart positions		
Year	Album	US	US R&B	US Indie
2004	Champion EP: Released: May 11, 2004; Label: Rhymesayers; Format: CD, Digital Download, LP	—	—	—
2009	The Truth Is Here: Released: March 9, 2009; Label: Rhymesayers, Warner Music Group; Format: CD, Digital Download, LP	119	69	18
2012	The Bite Marked Heart: Released: February 13, 2012; Label: Rhymesayers; Format: CD, Digital Download	—	—	—
2021	Brother Minutester Vol. 1: Released: August 27, 2021; Label: Travelers Media LLC; Format: Digital Download	—	—	—
2024	Satisfied Soul EP (with Ant): Released: November 11, 2024; Label: Mello Music Group; Format: Digital Download	—	—	—
2025	Brother Minutester Vol. 2: Üsküdar Sessions: Released: December 1, 2025; Label: Travelers Media LLC; Format: Digital Download	—	—	—
"—" denotes releases that did not chart.

=== Guest appearances ===
List of non-single guest appearances, with other performing artists, showing year released and album name
Title	Year	Other artist(s)	Album
"Without My Existence"	2000	Unknown Prophets	World Premier
"What Time Is It?"	2002	Musab	Respect the Life
"Cats Van Bags"	2003	Atmosphere	Seven's Travels
"The Truth"	2008	Jake One, Freeway	White Van Music
"Dreamin'"	2009	Gift of Gab, Del the Funky Homosapien	Escape 2 Mars
"Caged Bird, Pt. 1"	2009	Zion I	The Take Over
"So Wrong"	2010	Joell Ortiz, Talib Kweli, Jean Grae	Me, Myself & I (Part Two)
"Damn Right"	2011	Statik Selektah, Joell Ortiz	Population Control
"Maybe It's Just Me"	2011	Classified	Handshakes and Middle Fingers
"Civil War"	2011	Immortal Technique, Killer Mike, Chuck D	The Martyr
"Daughter"	2011	Prof	King Gampo
"Tragic"	2011	Grieves	Together/Apart
"Get Up Stand Up"	2012	Public Enemy	Most of My Heroes Still Don't Appear on No Stamp
"The Dangerous Three"	2013	R.A. the Rugged Man, Masta Ace	Legends Never Die
"Illuminotme"	2013	Bambu, Odessa Kane	Sun of a Gun
"A Reason to Breathe"	2013	Yonas	The Transition
"Live and Let Go"	2014	Hilltop Hoods	Walking Under Stars
"The Solution"	2015	Abstract Rule, Slug	Keep the Feel: A Legacy of Hip-Hop and Soul
"Understand"	2015	Talib Kweli, 9th Wonder, Planet Asia	Indie 500
"DeLorean"	2021	The Elovaters, G. Love & Special Sauce	DeLorean EP

== See also ==
- Underground hip-hop
- Twin Cities hip-hop
