= Us (Brother Ali album) =

Studio album by Brother Ali
- Released: September 22, 2009
- Genre: Hip hop
- Length: 61:50
- Label: Rhymesayers Entertainment
- Producer: Ant

Brother Ali chronology
| The Truth Is Here (2009) | Us (2009) | The Bite Marked Heart (2012) |

Professional ratings
Aggregate scores
| Source | Rating |
|---|---|
| Metacritic | 83/100 |
Review scores
| Source | Rating |
| AllMusic | 3.5/5 stars |
| The A.V. Club | A− |
| Billboard | 4/5 stars |
| The Boston Phoenix | 3.5/4 stars |
| HipHopDX | 4.5/5 |
| Pitchfork | 7.8/10 |
| PopMatters | 10/10 |
| RapReviews | 9/10 |
| Slant Magazine | 4/5 stars |
| Spin | 4/5 stars |

Us is the fourth studio album by American rapper Brother Ali. It was released on Rhymesayers Entertainment on September 22, 2009. The album is entirely produced by Ant.

== Critical reception ==
At Metacritic, which assigns a weighted average score out of 100 to reviews from mainstream critics, Us received an average score of 83% based on 12 reviews, indicating "universal acclaim".

Andrew Martin of PopMatters gave the album 10 stars out of 10, saying, "You could try doing something else while it plays, but it's unlikely you'll be able to focus on anything besides Ali's words and Ant's beats." Nate Patrin of Pitchfork gave the album a 7.8 out of 10, calling it "an album that stands as the most deeply thought-provoking work of Brother Ali's career".

The A.V. Club placed it at number 9 on the "Top 25 Albums of 2009" list. AllMusic named it as one of their "Favorite Hip-Hop/Rap Albums of 2009", while HipHopDX named it as one of the "Top 25 Albums of 2009".

== Track listing ==
| No. | Title | Length |
|---|---|---|
| 1. | "Brothers and Sisters" (featuring Chuck D and Stokley Williams) | 1:28 |
| 2. | "The Preacher" | 3:23 |
| 3. | "Crown Jewel" | 3:57 |
| 4. | "House Keys" | 2:42 |
| 5. | "Fresh Air" | 4:42 |
| 6. | "Tight Rope" | 3:36 |
| 7. | "Breakin' Dawn" | 4:38 |
| 8. | "The Travelers" | 5:18 |
| 9. | "Babygirl" | 4:34 |
| 10. | "'Round Here" | 3:55 |
| 11. | "Bad Mufucker Pt. 2" | 3:35 |
| 12. | "Best@it" (featuring Freeway and Joell Ortiz) | 4:24 |
| 13. | "Games" | 3:44 |
| 14. | "Slippin' Away" | 4:59 |
| 15. | "You Say (Puppy Love)" | 4:17 |
| 16. | "Us" (featuring Stokley Williams) | 2:44 |

== Charts ==
| Chart | Peak position |
|---|---|
| US Billboard 200 | 56 |
| US Independent Albums (Billboard) | 6 |
| US Top R&B/Hip-Hop Albums (Billboard) | 29 |
| US Rap Albums (Billboard) | 14 |
| US Tastemaker Albums (Billboard) | 7 |
