= Craig Minowa =

American singer-songwriter

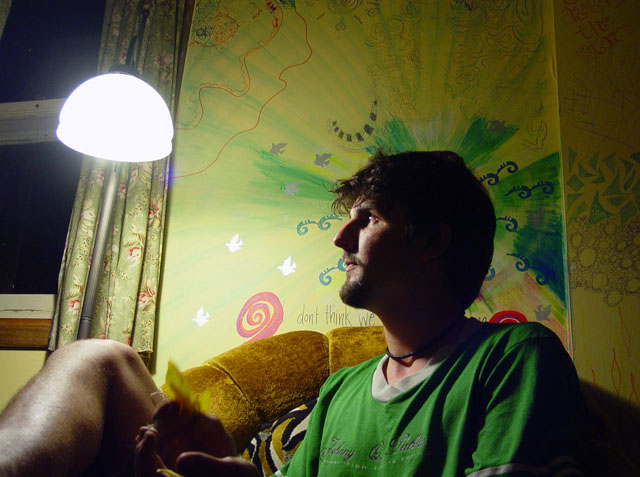
- Craig Minowa in 2004
- Born: Craig Richardson; Owatonna, Minnesota, U.S.
- Occupation: Musician
- Years active: 1995-present
- Known for: Cloud Cult

Craig Minowa is a singer, songwriter, and composer best known as the frontman for the alternative rock band Cloud Cult. He is also the founder of Earthology Records. Minowa was born Craig Richardson and grew up in Owatonna, Minnesota.

== Early life and education ==
Minowa was a self-described "astronomy geek" in elementary school who memorized the diameter of planets. Throughout his childhood, the family's living room was dominated not by a television, but by a piano which his mother would often play for Minowa and his sisters. "I think it distilled a lifelong feeling in me that you can make your own entertainment, and you can also sculpt your own mood by what you choose to create," he said. Minowa was heavily bullied in school but found comfort in writing music at a young age.

Minowa's spiritual interests were informed by his early childhood experiences growing up in a small rural prominently Christian town but extend into teen and young adult experiences with Buddhism, Taoism, Eckankar and Native American explorations. When he was 16, rather than meeting his family at church on Easter Sunday as planned, Minowa went out into the woods. "And I sat out there — a beautiful spring morning, everything coming to life, and had a religious experience that I hadn’t ever felt within those four walls of the church. And magic was reborn in me."

Minowa has a B.S. in environmental science from the University of Minnesota, Twin Cities. He recalls trying to decide in college whether to major in environmental science or music composition. Ultimately, he decided that focusing on music was too selfish, and that he could do more good for the world with an environmental science degree. He'd later learn the two professions could be meshed together.

== Career ==
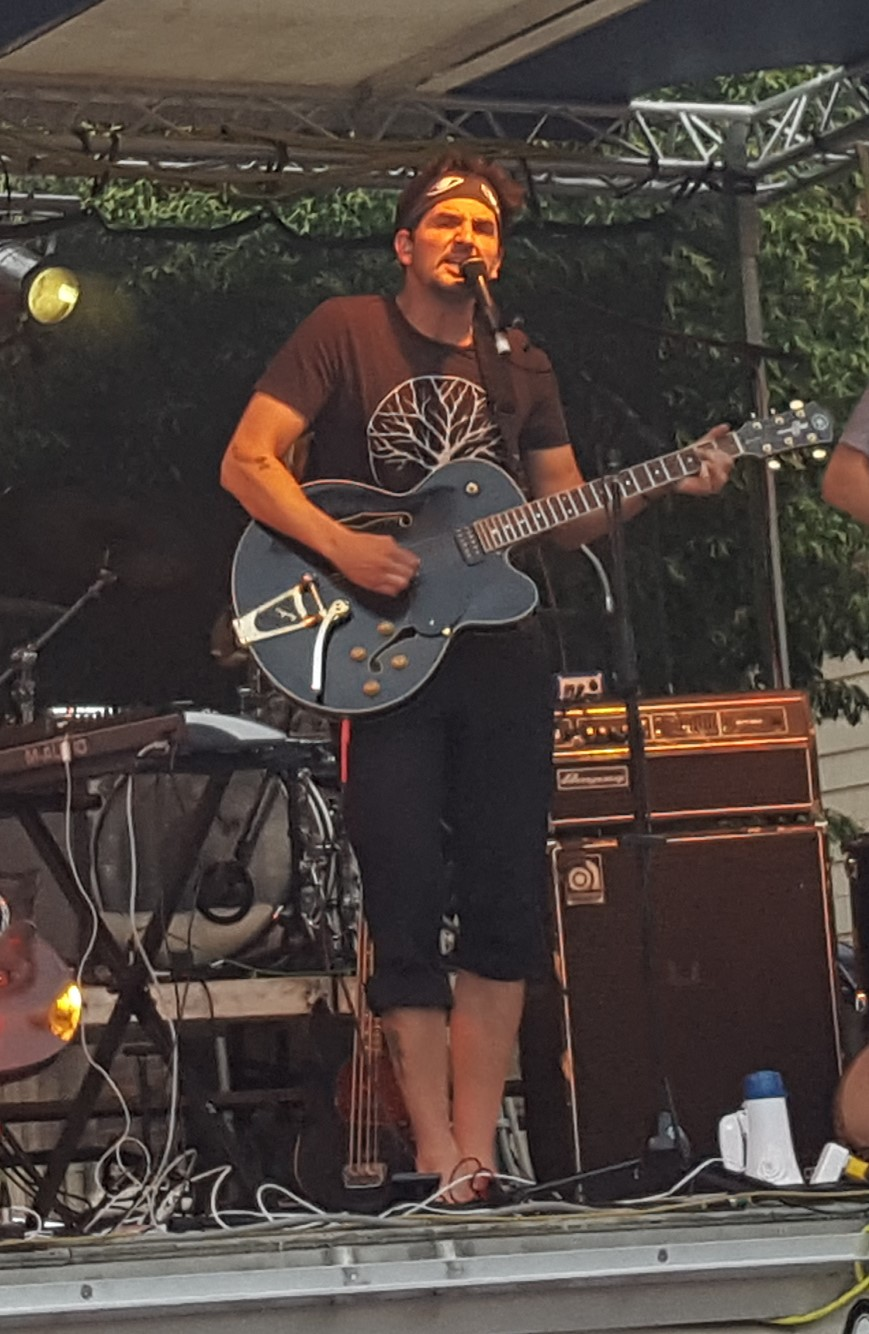
Minowa performing with Cloud Cult at the 2017 Artspire Festival in LaCrosse, Wisconsin

Minowa created his first album "The Shade Project" in 1995. At the beginning, it was Minowa's solo studio project. Although he loves the "sacred space" of writing and composing music, he was never drawn to the limelight of performing. He adopted the name Cloud Cult for his solo work with the release of "Who Killed Puck?" in 2000. After his two-year-old son, Kaidin, died in 2002, Minowa began writing music that explored that loss, and fans began telling him the music helped them deal with the losses in their lives, as well. According to Minowa, "that’s where things started to shift" and he began to believe he could do something good for others through music. In 2007, he described his lyrics as "evolving more and more in a philosophical, spiritual analysis. Not in a preachy sense, but more in trying to understand what it all means and really taking a hard look at mortality."

Even years into his career as a musician, Minowa continued holding a day job to earn a living. In 2008, he was working for the Organic Consumers Association, a nonprofit, as a writer and analyst.

Outside of his work with Cloud Cult, Minowa does freelance work as a composer, including over a dozen National Geographic films. Among other projects, he composed the score for the 2015 feature-length documentary film The Great Alone, about the dog sled racer Lance Mackey. Cloud Cult performed the score written by Minowa.

When asked whether he learns things from life's good experiences as well as the difficult ones, Minowa responded, "There’s a belief that you can’t create a good song without an incredible broken heart, that you can’t have true wisdom without that balance with the yin and the yang...you can learn from happiness and good experience, but unfortunately, in this life it seems that the true wisdom comes not only from the wonderful bubblegum flavors but from the things that have burned us, too. That’s what makes us richer, deeper people."

== Personal life ==
Minowa is divorced from Connie Minowa, a painter and previous member of Cloud Cult. They have four children, including Kaidin, who died in 2002 at the age of 2. In 2010, they moved to Viroqua, Wisconsin. Although Cloud Cult's lyrics are often considered in their own genre of "self-help rock", Minowa has been careful to keep his personal life out of the public lens.
