= All Tiny Creatures =

American indie rock band

- Origin: Wisconsin, United States
- Genres: Indie rock, Experimental pop, Minimalism
- Years active: 2008-Present
- Label: Hometapes
- Spinoff of: Collections of Colonies of Bees
- Members: Thomas Wincek; Andrew Fitzpatrick; Matthew Skemp; Ben Derickson
- Website: alltinycreatures.com

All Tiny Creatures is an experimental pop band based in Middleton and Madison Wisconsin. They were formed in 2008 by multi-instrumentalist and Volcano Choir member Thomas Wincek. Started as an instrumental project influenced by Krautrock, electronic music and classical minimalism, they later started incorporating vocals and more traditional pop song structures into their work.

The band has released two full-length albums (Harbors and Dark Clock), an EP (Segni) and two cassette tapes (An Iris Mixtape and Glass Bubbles Mixtape).

== History ==
In 2011 the band released an album, Harbors, which featured vocals by Justin Vernon, Helado Negro, Megafaun and Ryan Olcott of the band 12 Rods. The artwork for Harbors was done by designer Aaron Draplin. The music website Pitchfork.com gave Harbors a 7.8 rating.

All Tiny Creatures' second album, Dark Clock was released in 2013. In 2014 the band toured in support of the album with the band Lost in the Trees, including performances in Philadelphia and Montreal.

Although Thomas Wincek became a member of the band Field Report in 2014, and member Andrew Fitzpatrick became a member of Bon Iver in 2016, All Tiny Creatures continued performing, including a tour in 2017 with Barry Clark and No Death.
