= I, I Tour =

2019–22 concert tour by Bon Iver

i, i Tour
- Tour by Bon Iver
- Associated album: I, I
- Start date: August 31, 2019
- End date: November 11, 2022
- No. of shows: 23 in North America; 6 in Asia; 25 in Europe; 10 in Oceania; 64 in total

i, i Tour is a concert tour by American band Bon Iver, in support of their fourth studio album i, i. The tour began on August 31, 2019, in Missoula, Montana, United States and concluded on November 11, 2022, in Lisbon, Portugal.

== Background ==
Bon Iver announced the North American autumn tour dates on June 3, 2019 with opening acts Feist, Sharon Van Etten, and Yo La Tengo. The band also announced Asian dates on September 17, 2019. First set of European dates was announced on September 10, 2019 and the second one on January 24, 2020.

== Organization partnerships ==
Bon Iver, through their campaign 2ABillion, partnered with local organizations to fight gender inequity and to end domestic and sexual violence during the tour. In 2019, Bon Iver managed to collect more than $185,000 for their partners through the initiative.

Here are the local organizations partnered with 2ABillion, to date:

- Missoula — Make Your Move
- Vail — Bright Future Foundation
- Morrison — Girls Rock Denver
- Salt Lake City — Utah Domestic Violence Coalition
- George — SAGE Wenatchee
- Vancouver — West Coast LEAF
- Portland — Women's Foundation of Oregon
- San Francisco — W.O.M.A.N. Inc.
- Inglewood — Surviving In Numbers
- Saint Paul — Casa de Esperanza
- Rosemont — Resilience
- Toronto — Shelter Movers
- Columbus — BRAVO
- Philadelphia — Women's Way
- Brooklyn — Day One
- Boston — Mass NOW
- Washington, D.C. — DC SAFE and DASH
- Raleigh — InterAct
- Seoul — Korea Sexual Violence Relief Center
- Bangkok — Freedom Restoration Project
- Singapore — AWARE
- Jakarta — Hollaback! Jakarta
- Tokyo — Voice Up Japan

== Set list ==
This set list is from the concert on October 15, 2019 in Boston. It is not intended to represent all tour dates.

1. "iMi"
2. "We"
3. "Holyfields,"
4. "Perth"
5. "666 ʇ"
6. "715 - CREEKS"
7. "U (Man Like)"
8. "Jelmore"
9. "Faith"
10. "Marion"
11. "Towers"
12. "Blood Bank"
13. "Flume"
14. "Lump Sum"
15. "Holocene"
16. "Salem"
17. "Hey, Ma"
18. "Skinny Love"
19. "Sh'Diah"
20. "Naeem"

Encore

21. "____45_____"
22. "33 “GOD”"
23. "RABi"

== Tour dates ==
Date	City	Country	Venue	Opening act(s)
Leg 1 — Autumn North America
August 31, 2019	Missoula	United States	Kettlehouse Amphitheater	Indigo Girls
September 2, 2019	Vail	United States	Gerald R. Ford Amphitheater	Sharon Van Etten
September 3, 2019	Morrison	United States	Red Rocks Amphitheatre	Sharon Van Etten
September 4, 2019	West Valley City	United States	Maverik Center	Sharon Van Etten
September 6, 2019	George	United States	The Gorge Amphitheatre	Sharon Van Etten
September 7, 2019	Vancouver	Canada	Pacific Coliseum	Sharon Van Etten
September 10, 2019	Portland	United States	Theater of the Clouds	Sharon Van Etten
September 12, 2019	San Francisco	United States	Chase Center	Sharon Van Etten
September 15, 2019	Inglewood	United States	The Forum	Sharon Van Etten
October 3, 2019	Saint Paul	United States	Xcel Energy Center	Feist
October 4, 2019	Rosemont	United States	Allstate Arena	Feist
October 6, 2019	Toronto	Canada	Scotiabank Arena	Feist
October 8, 2019	Columbus	United States	Schottenstein Center	Feist
October 10, 2019	Philadelphia	United States	Liacouras Center	Feist
October 11, 2019	Brooklyn	United States	Barclays Center	Yo La Tengo
October 15, 2019	Boston	United States	TD Garden	Feist
October 17, 2019	Washington, D.C.	United States	The Anthem	Feist
October 18, 2019	Washington, D.C.	United States	The Anthem	Feist
October 19, 2019	Raleigh	United States	PNC Arena	Feist
Leg 2 — Asia
January 12, 2020	Seoul	South Korea	YES24 Live Hall	—
January 15, 2020	Bangkok	Thailand	Moonstar Studio	—
January 17, 2020	Singapore		The Star Performing Arts Centre	—
January 19, 2020	Jakarta	Indonesia	Tennis Indoor Senayan	—
January 21, 2020	Tokyo	Japan	Zepp Tokyo	—
January 22, 2020	Tokyo	Japan	Zepp Tokyo	—
Leg 3 — North America
October 22, 2021	Inglewood	United States	YouTube Theater	—
October 23, 2021	Inglewood	United States	YouTube Theater	—
Leg 4 — North America
March 30, 2022	Mesa	United States	Mesa Amphitheatre	Dijon
April 1, 2022	Austin	United States	Moody Amphitheatre	Dijon
April 2, 2022	Austin	United States	Moody Amphitheatre	Dijon
April 3, 2022	Irving	United States	Toyota Music Factory	Dijon
April 5, 2022	Houston	United States	White Oak Music Hall	Dijon
April 8, 2022	New Orleans	United States	Bold Sphere Music at Champions Square	Dijon
April 9, 2022	Atlanta	United States	Cadence Bank Amphitheatre	Dijon
April 12, 2022	Wilmington	United States	Live Oak Bank Pavilion	Dijon
April 14, 2022	St. Augustine	United States	St. Augustine Amphitheatre	Dijon
April 15, 2022	Miami	United States	Bayfront Park	Dijon
June 3, 2022	Queens	United States	Forest Hills Stadium	Bonny Light Horseman
June 4, 2022	Pittsburgh	United States	Stage AE	Bonny Light Horseman
June 7, 2022	Lewistown	United States	Artpark Amphitheater	Bonny Light Horseman
June 8, 2022	Essex Junction	United States	Champlain Valley Expo	Bonny Light Horseman
June 10, 2022	Portland	United States	Thompson's Point	Bonny Light Horseman
June 11, 2022	East Providence	United States	Bold Point Park	Bonny Light Horseman
June 12, 2022	Richmond	United States	Virginia Credit Union Live!	Bonny Light Horseman
June 15, 2022	Kansas City	United States	Starlight Theatre	Bonny Light Horseman
June 17, 2022	Maryland Heights	United States	St. Louis Music Park	Bonny Light Horseman
June 18, 2022	Lincoln	United States	Pinewood Bowl Theatre	Bonny Light Horseman
June 21, 2022	Newport	United States	PromoWest Pavilion	Bonny Light Horseman
June 24, 2022	Nashville	United States	Ascend Amphitheater	Bonny Light Horseman
June 25, 2022	Asheville	United States	Rabbit Rabbit	Bonny Light Horseman
June 26, 2022	Asheville	United States	Rabbit Rabbit	Bonny Light Horseman
Leg 5 — Europe
October 16, 2022	Dublin	Ireland	3Arena	CARM
October 19, 2022	Leeds	England	First Direct Arena	CARM
October 20, 2022	Glasgow	Scotland	OVO Hydro	CARM
October 24, 2022	Manchester	England	AO Arena	CARM
October 25, 2022	London	England	Wembley Arena	CARM
October 26, 2022	London	England	Wembley Arena	—
October 31, 2022	Berlin	Germany	Mercedes-Benz Arena	CARM
November 2, 2022	Amsterdam	Netherlands	Ziggo Dome	CARM
November 3, 2022	Antwerp	Belgium	Sportpaleis	CARM
November 5, 2022	Milan	Italy	Mediolanum Forum	CARM
November 7, 2022	Barcelona	Spain	Palau Sant Jordi	CARM
November 9, 2022	Madrid	Spain	WiZink Center	CARM
November 11, 2022	Lisbon	Portugal	Altice Arena	CARM
Leg 6 — Oceania
February 17, 2023	Sydney	Australia	Aware Super Theatre	
February 18, 2023	Sydney	Australia	Aware Super Theatre	
February 21, 2023	Hobart	Australia	MyState Bank Arena	
February 26, 2023	Perth	Australia	Red Hill Auditorium	
March 2, 2023	Brisbane	Australia	Riverstage	
March 4, 2023	Melbourne	Australia	Sidney Myer Music Bowl	
March 5, 2023	Melbourne	Australia	Sidney Myer Music Bowl	
March 10, 2023	Adelaide	Australia	Botanic Park	

=== Box office score data ===
Venue	City	Tickets sold / available	Gross revenue
Chase Center	San Francisco	8,674 / 9,500 (91%)	$592,963
The Forum	Inglewood	11,585 / 11,585 (100%)	$790,025
Total	20,259 / 21,085 (96%)	$1,382,988	
