= Jon Mueller =

American percussionist and composer (born 1970)

- Born: 1970 (age 55–56); Waukesha, Wisconsin, US
- Genres: Experimental, rock, jazz
- Occupations: Drummer, percussionist, composer
- Instruments: Drums, percussion
- Years active: 1997–present
- Labels: Jagjaguwar; Table of the Elements; Type Recordings; Important Records; Polyvinyl Records
- Website: www.rhythmplex.com

Jon Mueller (born 1970 in Waukesha, Wisconsin) is an American percussionist and composer, active in experimental and rock disciplines.

== Early life and education ==
Jon Mueller was introduced to music through his parents, and began taking guitar and piano lessons at an early age. After quitting both, he became interested in the drums after his friend inherited a drumset. The instrument appealed to him due to its focus away from melody. In an interview with Natasha Pickowicz, Mueller stated, "Hitting the drums and cymbals sounded good, no matter the combination." He then began taking snare drum lessons before moving to a full kit.

In 1990, he studied with jazz musician Hal Russell while attending Columbia College in Chicago.

Mueller graduated in 1995 from Cardinal Stritch University in Milwaukee with a bachelor's degree in English. In 2008, he earned his Master of Business Administration degree.

== Career ==
In the 1990s, he met guitarist Chris Rosenau, with whom he developed a long-time association. Together, they founded the groups Pele and Collections of Colonies of Bees. The latter group later co-founded Volcano Choir with Bon Iver's Justin Vernon. Their debut album Unmap reached number 92 on the Billboard 200 chart.

He has also worked with a variety of musicians such as James Plotkin, Rhys Chatham, Asmus Tietchens, Z'EV, Jason Kahn, Marcus Schmickler, Bhob Rainey, Jack Wright, and others.

In 2003, he began experimenting with vibrating drums on top of speakers. This direction is documented on his What's Lost is Something Important CD, Metals CD, Physical Changes LP/CD/DVD, and Alphabet of Movements LP.

He has performed solo and in various groupings throughout North America, Europe, United Kingdom, and Japan, in venues including New Museum (New York), Arnolfini (Bristol, UK), Musée des Beaux-Arts de Montréal, (Montréal, QC), Issue Project Room (New York), Guggenheim (New York), and Cafe OTO (London, UK). His solo and collaborative recordings have been released by labels such as Table of the Elements, Polyvinyl Records, Type Recordings, Jagjaguwar, Hometapes, Important Records, Taiga Records, and many others.

In 1999, he formed the record label, magazine, and music distribution company Crouton. Crouton published over 40 releases, mostly in limited editions, featuring the work of The Hafler Trio, Asmus Tietchens, Daniel Menche, Robert Hampson, Robert Haigh, Jarboe, Lionel Marchetti, Jason Kahn, Aranos, Alessandro Bosetti, Osso Exotico, Z'EV, Collections of Colonies of Bees, Pele, and many others, as well as his own releases. Crouton also organized events in the Milwaukee and Chicago areas. These were documented by the press and even filmed as part of a PBS documentary (on Ken Vandermark). The business closed in 2009.

In 2009, he was referred to by Pitchfork as "an audacious ringleader for new music."

In 2011, he started his Death Blues project, described by Mueller as, "a multidisciplinary project that addresses the inevitability of death as impetus to become more present in each moment." Performances for the project took place throughout the U.S., including Hopscotch Fest and Alverno Presents.

=== Public Speaking ===
He has spoken to audiences about creativity and new business approaches at The Music Forum: Loyola University (NOLA), WMSE's Radio Summercamp (Milwaukee, WI), Viva! Festival (Montreal), Wesleyan University (Middleton, CT), PRSA (Milwaukee, WI), and MARN (Milwaukee, WI).

=== Writing ===
He has written a novella, Pianobread (1999), a box of short stories, Endings (2004), a collection of short stories Somewhere (2024), and has contributed non-fiction writing and reviews for ChangeThis.com, Pear Noir!, The Shepherd Express, OnMilwaukee, Amoeba Records Hollywood, and contributed to The 100 Best Business Books of All Time (Penguin/Portfolio) by Jack Covert and Todd Sattersten.

== Discography ==
=== Solo ===
- Here: An Advanced Study of Death Blues CD, Rhythmplex (US), 2012
- Alphabet of Movements LP, Type Records (UK), 2011
- V/A – Coupling: Dedicated to the Man and Based on the Work of Stan Brakhage CD, Silent Media (US), 2011
- The Whole CD/LP+bonus CD, Type Records (UK), 2010
- Halves cassette, Notice Recordings (US), 2010
- Physical Changes LP/CD/DVD, Radium/Table of the Elements (US), 2009
- Jon Mueller/Gino Robair split – "Dot Feed" track on split 3" CD, Compost and Height (UK), 2009
- Strung 12", Table of the Elements (US), 2008
- Hollow Voices/Singing Hands cassette, Friends and Relatives (US), 2008
- Metals CD, Table of the Elements (US), 2008
- Emerson Hi-Fidelity CD, Autumn Records (US), 2005
- What's Lost Is Something Important. What's Found Is Something Not Revealed. CD, Crouton (US), 2005
- V/A: the audible still-life CD – "Heat", Stasisfield (US), 2003
- V/A: Just Drums CD – "Pop", Fever Pitch (US), 2003
- Solo Percussion For Two – "Beyond the Surface of Actions", Split 7" with Jeph Jerman, No Information Records (US), 2003
- "A Wooden Bicycle" MP3 release, Stassisfield.com (US), 2002
- Folktales No. 2 – "How I Learned To Breathe" 3" CD, Crouton (US), 2001

=== Collaborations ===
- Volcano Choir - Repave (2013)
- Jon Mueller + James Plotkin – Terminal Velocity 2xLP, Taiga Records (US), 2012
- V/A (Mueller appears with James Plotkin) – Utech Records Music Fest 2xCD, Utech Records/KFJC (US), 2012
- V/A (Mueller appears with Burkhard Beins) – Bridges 2xLP, Machinefabriek (NL), 2011
- John Cage – The Works for Percussion I DVD, Mode Records (US), 2011
- Jon Mueller + Z'EV – HYDratioN LP, Important Records (US), 2010
- Jason Kahn + Jon Mueller – Phase digital release, FSS (US), 2010
- Volcano Choir – Unmap LP/CD, Jagjaguwar (US), 2009
- MOUTHS – 3v1/3v2 CD, Absurd (GR), 2008
- Jon Mueller and Jason Kahn – Topography CD, Xeric/Crouton (US), 2008
- Melissa St. Pierre – Specimens CD, Radium (US), 2008
- Rhys Chatham – Guitar Trio is My Life 3xCD, Radium (US), 2008
- Asmus Tietchens and Jon Mueller – Acht Stücke CD, Auf Abwegen (DE), 2007
- Jeph Jerman and Jon Mueller – Nodes and Anti-Nodes DVD, Crouton (US), 2007
- Tim Catlin/Jon Mueller – Plates and Wires CD, Crouton (US), 2007
- Jon Mueller/Martijn Tellinga – bowl, helicopter CDep, Korm Plastics (NL), 2007
- MOUTHS – 1v2e LP, Entr'acte (UK), 2006
- Jason Kahn/Jon Mueller – Supershells CD, Formed Records (US), 2006
- Werner Moebius/Jon Mueller/Jim Schoenecker – Amalgam CD, Utech Records (US), 2006
- The Portable Quartet – Take The Train CD, Crouton (US), 2005
- Carol Genetti/Jon Mueller/Jack Wright – Nom Tom CD, Spring Garden Music (US), 2005
- Jon Mueller and Kaveh Soofi – Endings book, Crouton (US), 2004
- Jon Mueller and Jim Schoenecker – The Interview CD, Longbox Recordings (US), 2004
- Jason Kahn and Jon Mueller – Papercuts CD, Crouton (US), 2004
- Jon Mueller/Bhob Rainey/Jim Schoenecker – S/T CD, Crouton (US), 2004
- Hat Melter (Hess/Klatt/Mueller/Turner) – Unknown Album LP, Crouton (US), 2003
- Asmus Tietchens/Jon Mueller – 7 Stücke CD, Auf Abwegen (DE), 2003
- Raccoons (Jon Mueller/Hal Rammel/Chris Rosenau) – Mother 2xCD, Crouton (US), 2002
- Aranos/Mueller/Rosenau – Bleeding In Behind Pastel Screens CD, Crouton (US), 2001
- Nelson-Raney, Steve/Jon Mueller – Cutting Off The Edge Of Time CD, Penumbra Music (US), 2001
- Lancaster, Byard Trio – S/T CD, Soutrane Recording Company (US), 2000
- Field Of Sound – S/T CD, Soutrane Recording Company (US), 2000
- Castle Broadway – S/T CD, Soutrane Recording Company (US), 2000
- Raccoons (Jon Mueller/Hal Rammel/Chris Rosenau) – S/T CD– Crouton (US), 2000
- Pianobread – S/T, book/CD box (performed on CD and also wrote novella of the same title in box) Crouton (US), 1999

=== Collections of Colonies of Bees ===
- Giving CD/LP, Hometapes (US), 2011
- Giving CD, Contrarede (JP), 2010
- Toe/Collections of Colonies of Bees split CD, Contrarede (JP), 2009
- Impala Eardrums CD/LP, "Athlete," Radium/Table of the Elements (US), 2008
- Six Guitars 12", Table of the Elements (US), 2008
- Birds CD/LP, Radium/Table of the Elements (US), 2008
- Customer CD/LP, Polyvinyl Records (US), 2004, CD on Some of Us (JP), 2004
- Eyebrows CD, Self-released for Japan tour, 2004
- meyou CD, Crouton (US), 2003
- fa.ce (a CD, Crouton (US), 2002
- Rance CD, Crouton (US), 2000
- S/T CD, the Rosewood Union (UK), 1999

=== Pele ===
- A Scuttled Bender in a Watery Closet 2xCD, Polyvinyl Record Co. (US), 2009
- Last Show 2xDVD, Contrarede (JP), 2009
- "Drop Attack," Pele/Toe split CD, Dis(ign) Muzyq (JP), 2001, 7" on Polyvinyl Records (US), 2004
- "Cigarette Papers," Toe: Re:designed CD, Catune (JP), 2003
- Enemies CD/LP, Polyvinyl Record Co. (US), 2002
- "Hagoo," Split LP with Rhythm of Black Lines, Sixgunlover Records (US), 2002
- "Five Years in Four Minutes," Sangatsu remix CD, Weather Records (JP), 2001
- "Gas The Nutsy," Re Direction compilation CD, Polyvinyl Record Co. (US), 2001
- The Nudes CD/LP, Polyvinyl Record Co. (US), 2000
- Realize It 12"/CD, Crouton (US), 2000
- "Positive Woman," it goes without saying compilation CD, Sign Language Records (US), 1999
- Elephant CD, Sign Language Records (US), 1999 (also released on Polyvinyl Records (US), 2003)
- "Blue Cecil b/w Apiary" 12", the Rosewood Union (UK), 1998
- Emergency Room Egg CD, Crouton (US) + Japan only edition, 1998
- People Living with Animals. Animals Kill People. CD, Star Star Stereo (US), 1998
- Teaching the History of Teaching Geography CD, Star Star Stereo (US),

(also released on the Rosewood Union (UK)), 1998

=== Telecognac ===
- Memory CD, Crouton (US), 2001
- Over (Jarboe/Telecognac) CD, Crouton (US), 2000
- Flor (Story and 3" CD) Crouton (US), 2000
- "The Possibility Of A Face," Crouton Number Two CD, Crouton (US), 1999
- "Paper weight," Various 500 Lock-Grooves by 500 Artists LP, RRRecords (US), 1998
- "White Christmas," angels we have heard in hi-fi compilation cassette, Molotov Cocktail Recordings (US), 1997
- "Pause Until I Mocket," Existence compilation LP (US), 1997
- S/T CD, Lombardi Recording Company (US), 1997
