= Freeman (Freeman album) =

Studio album by Freeman
- Released: May 23, 2014
- Recorded: 2014
- Genres: Alternative rock, indie rock, pop rock
- Length: 46:58
- Label: Partisan Records
- Producer: Chris Shaw

Freeman is the debut and only studio album by American rock band Freeman.

== Background ==
In May 2012, Gene Ween left Ween and began performing under his legal name, Aaron Freeman, and immediately released his debut solo LP, Marvelous Clouds, a collection of Rod McKuen cover songs produced by Ben Vaughn. Freeman continued to perform both solo shows and shows accompanied by Joe Young from 2012-2014. Freeman, who had relocated to Woodstock, New York and begun teaching at Paul Green's School of Rock, assembled musicians from the Brooklyn, New York area, as well as North Carolina, to form a new group and record an album.

Partisan Records released the album, Freeman, on May 23, 2014. Freeman was produced by Chris Shaw who had previously produced Ween's White Pepper album. The live version of the band, featuring Joe Young on bass and Zach Tenorio-Miller on keyboards, along with Chris Boerner and Kyle Keegan, toured throughout July 2014 in support of the album.

== Reception ==
Professional ratings
Review scores
| Source | Rating |
|---|---|
| AllMusic | link |
| Consequence of Sound | B |
| Exclaim! | 7/10 |
| Mojo | 4/5 stars |
| Pitchfork | 6.5/10 |
| Spin | 7/10 |

Freeman received generally favorable reviews from critics. AllMusic's Stephen Thomas Erlewine wrote, "If anything, Freeman is a tighter record than McCartney -- it's not homemade, it's all complete songs -- but there's no denying it shares the same spirit; that it is the sound of breaking dawn of a new day."

== Track listing ==
| No. | Title | Length |
|---|---|---|
| 1. | "Covert Discretion" | 4:54 |
| 2. | "The English and Western Stallion" | 3:18 |
| 3. | "(For a While) I Couldn't Play My Guitar Like a Man" | 4:45 |
| 4. | "El Shaddai" | 4:23 |
| 5. | "Black Bush" | 2:52 |
| 6. | "Gimme One More" | 4:54 |
| 7. | "More Than the World" | 3:02 |
| 8. | "All the Way to China" | 3:57 |
| 9. | "Golden Monkey" | 5:12 |
| 10. | "Delicate Green" | 4:24 |
| 11. | "There Is a Form" | 3:09 |
| 12. | "I Know a Girl" | 2:08 |

== Personnel ==
- Aaron Freeman - composer, electric guitar, acoustic guitar, vocals, synthesizer, primary artist
- Dave Godowsky - co-composer (tracks 2 & 3), acoustic guitar, organ, piano, vocals
- Chris Boerner - electric guitar
- Brad Cook - bass
- Kyle Keegan - percussion
- Chris Shaw - producer, engineer
- Marco Benevento - organ, piano, Wurlitzer
- Tracy Bonham - backing vocals (track 10), violin (track 4)
- The Black Bush Boys - percussion (track 5)
- Greg Calbi - mastering
- Paul Q. Kolderie - mixing
- Nick LaVecchia - cover photo
- Zeynep Sankaynagi - drawing
