= Dave Godowsky =

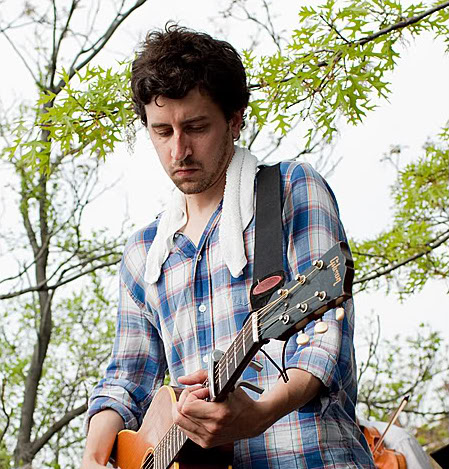
- Godowsky performing on a rooftop in Cambridge, Massachusetts

Background information
- Born: October 3, 1979 (age 46); Framingham, Massachusetts, U.S.
- Genres: Folk, pop, rock
- Occupations: Musician, songwriter, artist, artist manager, A&R
- Instruments: Guitar, piano
- Years active: 2008–present
- Website: www.davegodowsky.com

Dave Godowsky (born October 3, 1979) is an American artist, songwriter, and musical entrepreneur from Maine.

== Discography ==
=== Albums ===
- Dave Godowsky, All You Love Is Need (2009)
- Dave Godowsky, Pregret (2016)
- Dave Godowsky, Cuts (2020)

=== Appearances ===
- Jocie Adams, Bed Of Notions (2011) (piano on "Bed Of Notions")
- Field Report, Marigolden (2014) (vocals on "Summons")
- FREEMAN, FREEMAN (2014) (synth, piano, co-writer on "The English And Western Stallion," co-writer on "(For A While) I Couldn't Play My Guitar like A Man," guitar on "Black Bush," piano on "Golden Monkey," organ, piano on "Delicate Green," piano on "There Is A Form.")
- Rose Polenzani, The Rabbit (2011) (Glockenspiel on "Seven Swans," Wurlitzer on "Blue Seed," Glockenspiel on "Old Woman," Wurlitzer on "The Hardship," piano on "Lawn And The Sky," piano on "Bitter Heart," vocals on "Dead Rabbit," guitar, vocals on "Alligator River," glockenspiel on "Calculation (10 Babies)", piano on "Living In A Country," glockenspiel on "No One Knows," guitar on "Highest Hopes," glockenspiel, piano on "Pretty Black Ship.")

== Songwriting ==
In 2013, Godowsky co-wrote "The English and Western Stallion," and "(For A While) I Couldn't Play My Guitar Like A Man" with Gene Ween for his first post-Ween album, FREEMAN (2014). Godowsky's song "So Long, Theresa" was covered by Marissa Nadler on her 2010 covers record. Godowsky co-wrote "Nothing 'Bout Nothing" with Kris Delmhorst and "Lost In Translation" with Mark Erelli.

== Other collaborations ==
Godowsky's 2016 record Pregret features guest vocalists Adam Duritz (Counting Crows) and Lianne La Havas. He has performed on stage with Justin Vernon, Counting Crows, Delta Spirit, Hamilton Leithauser, Martha Wainwright, Gene Ween, Dave Dondero, Elvis Perkins, Ben Kweller, Aoife O'Donovan, Sarah Siskind & Al Kooper. Godowsky was a member of Guns N' Roses cover band "Mr Brownstone," that performed at Bonnaroo in 2003 and on the Late Show with David Letterman in 2008. In a 2015 Gothamist article, he described the Letterman performance as "the worst musical performance in the history of the show."

== Artwork ==
From 2007-2013, Godowsky exclusively worked with fine tipped pens, creating fictitious landscapes. He created artwork for Volcano Choir's 2009 record Unmap, whose title was inspired by Godowsky's early work. Since 2013, he has primarily worked with chalk, charcoal, and graphite on paper.

== A&R/management ==
As a manager, Godowsky's client history includes Cass McCombs, Okkervil River, Field Report, Against Me!, Ben Kweller, Clap Your Hands Say Yeah, Gene Ween, Martha Wainwright, Speedy Ortiz and producers Chris Shaw and Paul Q. Kolderie. As A&R, Godowsky is credited with discovering Delta Spirit, Nathaniel Rateliff, and Field Report as well as signing deals with veteran musical artists including Mike Gordon (Phish), Sondre Lerche, Son Volt, Ween, Heartless Bastards, John Grant, Pure Bathing Culture, and The Dismemberment Plan, and producing compilations for John Fahey and Loudon Wainwright III.
