= Pele (American band) =

American instrumental post-rock band

- Origin: Milwaukee, Wisconsin, U.S.
- Genres: Post-rock, indie rock, jazz fusion, experimental rock
- Years active: 1997–2004; 2014–present
- Label: Polyvinyl
- Members: Jon Mueller; Chris Rosenau; Matt Tennessen
- Past members: Scott Schoenbeck; Scott Beschta; Jon Minor

Pele is an instrumental post-rock band from Milwaukee, Wisconsin. The group formed in the summer of 1997 by guitarist Chris Rosenau, bassist Scott Schoenbeck and drummer Jon Mueller. Ever-evolving in sound, the band was difficult to classify. Early in Pele's career, critics had dubbed the band post-rock. However, later many fans began to hear them as jazzy, with "nimble" guitars, "rolling" bass, and "skittering" drums "with angular fills and layered beats." These so-called jazz elements shone through untraditional "syncopated handclaps, voices, and various blips and bleeps."

After seven years, thirteen releases, and various national and international tours, Pele announced their winter 2004 tour would be their last. The remaining members went on to various projects, most notably The Promise Ring and Paris, Texas, but also New Rising Sons, Volcano Choir, and Collections of Colonies of Bees.

In 2014, the lineup of Mueller, Rosenau and Tennessen reformed and supported fellow Polyvinyl act American Football, who themselves reunited that year, at their New Year's Eve show at the Bottom Lounge in Chicago. A show in Milwaukee was later announced for April 18, 2015 at the Cactus Club.

== Band members ==
- Jon Mueller - drums, percussion
- Chris Rosenau - guitar
- Scott Schoenbeck - bass
- Scott Beschta - keyboards
- Jon Minor - sampler, guitar, tambourine
- Matt Tennessen - bass

== Partial discography ==
- Teaching the History of Teaching Geography (1998, Star Star Stereo Records)
- People Living with Animals. Animals Kill People (1998, Star Star Stereo Records)
- Elephant (1999, Sign Language Records)
- The Nudes (2000, Polyvinyl Records)
- Realize It (2001, Crouton Music)
- Enemies (2002, Polyvinyl Records)
- Pele/Rhythm of Black Lines (split 2003, Sixgunlover Records)
- Pele / toe (split EP 2004, Polyvinyl Records)
- A Scuttled Bender in a Watery Closet (April 7, 2009, Polyvinyl Records)

== See also ==
- Polyvinyl Record Co.
