= Christopher Porterfield =

American songwriter

Christopher Porterfield is an American songwriter, guitarist and singer. He currently leads the folk band Field Report. Porterfield started his music career in High School, co-founding the band, Dinner With Greg. He also previously played with DeYarmond Edison, a band led by Bon Iver frontman Justin Vernon. He graduated from Mayo High School in Rochester, Minnesota and the University of Wisconsin-Eau Claire with a degree in journalism. He has a younger brother named Tim, who graduated and played college basketball for Viterbo University in Wisconsin.
