= Freeman (band) =

American alternative rock band

- Freeman live in San Francisco on October 31, 2014

Background information
- Origin: Brooklyn, New York, U.S.
- Genres: Alternative rock
- Years active: 2014–2015
- Labels: Partisan Records
- Past members: Aaron Freeman; Dave Godowsky; Chris Boerner; Joe Young; Brad Cook; Kyle Keegan
- Website: freemantheband.com

Freeman is an American alternative rock band led by Ween singer/guitarist Aaron Freeman.

== History ==
Aaron Freeman quit Ween in May 2012, citing his desire to stop his long-time drug and alcohol addiction. He played shows accompanied by Joe Young from 2012 until 2014, when he formed a new band, "Freeman," featuring Chris Boerner on guitar, Brad Cook on bass, Dave Godowsky on keyboards and Kyle Keegan on drums. The band's self-titled debut was released July 22, 2014 on Partisan Records. The band spent the second half of 2014 on the road (although with Young on bass) with Arc Iris. Arc Iris keyboardist Zach Tenorio-Miller also played with Freeman for most of these shows.

== Discography ==
Albums

- Freeman (2014), Partisan Records
