= DeYarmond Edison =

American indie folk band

- Origin: Eau Claire, Wisconsin, United States
- Genres: Indie folk, alt-country, Americana
- Years active: 2001–2006
- Label: Unsigned
- Past members: Brad Cook; Phil Cook; Justin Vernon; Joe Westerlund; Chris Porterfield

DeYarmond Edison is the former band of the members of Bon Iver, Megafaun, and Field Report. Guitarist and vocalist Justin Vernon went on to create Bon Iver; three members (Brad Cook: bass, guitar; Phil Cook: keyboards, banjo; Joe Westerlund: Percussion) formed the freak folk group Megafaun, and Christopher Porterfield began composing, eventually establishing Field Report. More recently, Brad Cook has established himself as a highly sought-after producer in the indie music scene, working with acts such as Waxahatchee, Suki Waterhouse, and others.

== History ==
The band began as friends from Eau Claire, Wisconsin, evolving from Justin Vernon's early band Mount Vernon and taking its name from Justin Vernon's two middle names. The members first met at the H.O.R.D.E. Festival in 1997, bonded at a Wisconsin jazz camp, and played together in various combinations before finally playing as DeYarmond Edison in 2002. The band's style is a blend of folk and Americana sounds with more modern atmospheric and electronic elements. DeYarmond Edison recorded two albums while in Eau Claire, DeYarmond Edison and Silent Signs.

After a period of success in Eau Claire's music scene the band decided to move to Raleigh, North Carolina to begin a musical career in a new location. The band experienced some success in Raleigh, including a five-show residency at Raleigh's Bickett Gallery, but eventually broke up because of tensions caused by different musical directions and philosophies and personal reasons. The breakup also occurred subsequent to Vernon falling severely ill with a form of mononucleosis that damages the liver. After the breakup, which was officially announced on the band's MySpace page on September 15, 2006, DeYarmond Edison made a five track unreleased EP available for download. Four of the songs can be downloaded for free on the band's MySpace page.

Following the dissolution of DeYarmond Edison, Vernon eventually returned to Wisconsin to live in his father's cabin, and over the course of 3 months of isolation, he produced what became the Bon Iver album For Emma, Forever Ago. Three of the remaining members of DeYarmond Edison formed Megafaun, eventually releasing their own album Bury the Square, and former member Christopher Porterfield spent the following five years composing material for his solo project, Field Report, which was released in September 2012.

== Reunion ==
DeYarmond Edison reunited to play a show at the Fader Fort by Fiat at SXSW 2011. In 2016, in collaboration with Bruce Hornsby, they contributed a version of The Grateful Dead's "Black Muddy River" to Day of the Dead, the twenty-fifth compilation release benefiting the Red Hot Organization and the second such compilation to be produced by Aaron and Bryce Dessner of The National.

== Epoch ==
In June 2023, the band announced a box set titled ‘Epoch’ featuring 5-LPs, 4-CDs, and a 60,000 word tome written by longtime friend, music journalist, and executive producer Grayson Haver Currin.

The compilation includes recordings from the early days of Mount Vernon and the newly-remastered ‘Silent Signs’, Bon Iver-precursor ‘hazeltons’, tapes of the very first Megafaun rehearsal, as well as live performances. Epoch was released August 18, 2023.

== Discography ==
=== DeYarmond Edison (2004) ===
1. "Leave Me Wishing More" – 5:14
2. "As Long as I Can Go" – 5:27
3. "Dusty Road (So Kind)" – 6:45
4. "There Is Something" – 6:57
5. "The Lake" – 5:55
6. "Conquistadors" – 7:14
7. "Jackson and David" – 6:10
8. "The Unseen" – 4:35
9. "My Whole Life Long" – 7:12
10. "(For Bill)" – 5:11

=== Silent Signs (2005) ===
1. "Lift" – 1:38
2. "Silent Signs" – 3:50
3. "Heroin(e)" – 3:28
4. "Love Long Gone" – 4:35
5. "First Impression" – 3:32
6. "Bones" – 5:25
7. "Heart for Hire" – 3:44
8. "Dead Anchor" – 3:18
9. "Ragstock" – 2:40
10. "We" – 4:47
11. "Dash" 5:01
12. "Time to Know" – 6:06

=== The Bickett Residency (Live) (2005) ===
CD 1 – Set 1: Phil

1. "The Longest Train" – 4:02
2. "Going To Germany" – 2:53
3. "I Been Drinking" – 3:54
4. "No Depression In Heaven" – 4:55
5. "Step It Up And Go" – 2:16
6. "The Banks Of The Ohio" – 5:45

CD 1 – Set 2: Joe

1. "Sea Legs" – 6:28
2. "Abel + Cain" – 8:54
3. "Visual Performance Str." – 4:07
4. "Afro Blue" – 7:12

CD 2 – Set 3: Brad

1. "Four Keyboard Phase In A" – 14:01

CD 2 – Set 4: Justin

1. "Will The Circle Be Unbroken" – 4:23
2. "Bones" – 6:30
3. "Exercise In Abandonment" – 2:09
4. "Satisfied Mind" – 4:55
5. "Come And Go With Me" – 6:07

=== Unreleased EP (2006) ===
1. "Baby Done Got Your Number" – 2:05
2. "Song for a Lover of Long Ago" – 5:47
3. "Epoch" – 4:42
4. "Where We Belong" – 9:44
5. "Finale" – 2:10
