= Yi and iMi =

Pair of songs by American band Bon Iver

"Yi" and "iMi"
- "iMi" cover art

Song by Bon Iver

from the album I, I
- Released: August 8, 2019
- Recorded: 2014–2019
- Studio: April Base (Eau Claire, Wisconsin); Sonic Ranch (Tornillo, Texas)
- Length: 0:31 ("Yi"); 3:16 ("iMi")
- Songwriters: "Yi" writers: Trever Hagen; BJ Burton; "iMi" writers: James Blake; Rob Moose; Brad Cook; Mike Lewis; Mike Noyce; Burton; Jeremy Nutzman; Channy Leaneagh; Wheezy; Josh Berg
- Lyricist: Justin Vernon
- Producers: Chris Messina; Cook; Vernon

Lyric videos
- "Yi" on YouTube "iMi" on YouTube

"Yi" and "iMi" are songs by American indie folk band Bon Iver from their fourth studio album, I, I (2019). The songs are the first two tracks on the album, with the former being a 31-second phone recording that serves as an intro to the latter. Both songs were produced by Justin Vernon, Brad Cook, and Chris Messina, with additional production by BJ Burton. "Yi" and "iMi" feature additional production by Trevor Hagen and Andrew Sarlo, respectively.

"Yi" and "iMi" are built off an audio snippet of cardboard sliding over a radio that is switched on-and-off. Vernon is credited as the sole lyricist on both songs, with him singing about the themes of comfort and familiarity. Recording of "iMi" took five years and nearly 30 collaborators to complete. "Yi" was recorded in the winter of 2014 at the April Base in Eau Claire, Wisconsin, which began the recording process of "iMi" that was completed in 2019 at the Sonic Ranch in Tornillo, Texas. Credited composers and musicians include James Blake, Velvet Negroni, Camilla Staveley-Taylor, Aaron Dessner, CJ Camerieri, and Wheezy, amongst others.

== Background and recording ==
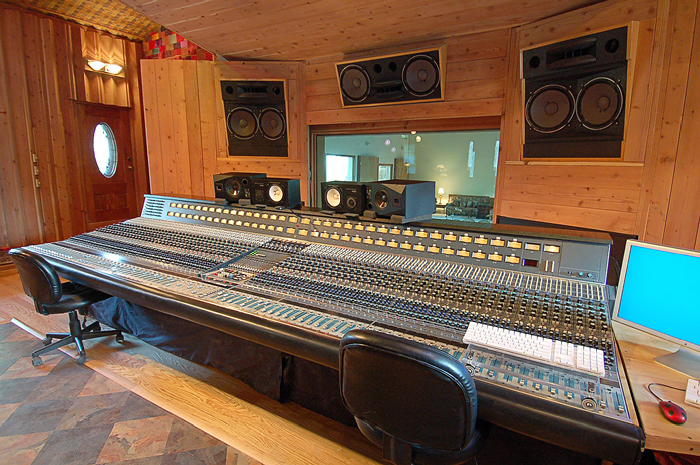
Justin Vernon began recording the song in 2014, yet didn't finish writing its lyrics until 2019, at the Sonic Ranch in Texas.

"Yi" is a phone recording from the winter of 2014 in Eau Claire, Wisconsin. Bon Iver frontman Justin Vernon and his close friend Trever Hagen were experimenting with turning a radio on-and-off while sliding cardboard over it at the time, resembling a hip hop chop. Vernon immediately told producer Brad Cook that he wanted this fragmented recording to be the basis of the first track on their then-upcoming album, which later became "iMi".

Mike Noyce recorded his vocals for the track in 2015. That same year, Vernon met with British musician James Blake while the former was in London, where the latter played synthesizers for the track. The two had previously collaborated on the tracks "Fall Creek Boys Choir" from 2011 and "I Need a Forest Fire" from 2016. American singer Frank Ocean was present for Blake's contributions. In 2017, Vernon previewed "iMi" to American record producer Wheezy, where he offered to provide drum programming for the track. Prior to the collaboration, Wheezy did not know of Vernon or Bon Iver. In 2018, Rob Moose's Worms Crew recorded the horns on the track. Moose had made three different trips to Wisconsin for working on the song.

Vernon struggled to write his first verse for the song due to the pressure that "iMi" would be the album's first full track. In January 2019, recording continued at the Sonic Ranch in Tornillo, Texas. Andrew Sarlo, who was a long-time fan of Bon Iver, provided additional production for the track while he was at the Sonic Ranch. Cook called Sarlo's work a "turning point" for the song, praising his chopping of the chorus and the bassline. The former then pressured Vernon to complete writing the lyrics to the song.

== Composition and lyrics ==
"iMi"
Audio sample of "iMi". The basis of the song was turning a radio on-and-off while sliding cardboard over it to resemble a hip hop chop.

The basis of "Yi" and "iMi" came from a snippet of Vernon and Hagen turning a radio on-and-off, all while sliding cardboard over it. Spencer Kornhaber, writing for The Atlantic, described "Yi" as an intro into "iMi" and stated that car wash-like noises "keep a lazy rhythm". Kornhaber elaborated, saying that the songs' busyness eventually "gives way to cozy strumming". The songs' elements cumulate, with Will Hermes, for Rolling Stone, stating that "all of it somehow gel[s] into a fantastic whole."

Hermes described the beginning of the songs as "doubling-down on the future-pop abstractions" before making way for Vernon's raw vocals. Matthew Strauss of Pitchfork described Vernon's delivery as simple and his lyrics as him "locating peace within the ordinary and everyday"." Zack Ruskin of Variety described Vernon's lyrics as "celebrating the comfort of familiarity". Mike Noyce, Velvet Negroni, Camilla Staveley-Taylor, and James Blake collaborate to sing across different frequencies within the song. Kornhaber stated that he believes the chorus "I am / I am / I am" ironically gives a sense of we.

== Release and promotion ==
On July 11, 2019, Bon Iver announced their fourth studio album I, I, and revealed a track list that included both "Yi" and "iMi". On August 8, 2019, without prior announcement, eight of the album's nine remaining songs, including "iMi", were released digitally. The releases were hourly, while "Yi" was then shared exclusively on Reddit.

On September 1, 2019, Bon Iver started their I, I tour in Bonner, Montana. "iMi" was performed at the show and was included on the set list for the tour. On October 1 of that year, Bon Iver performed in Brooklyn as the special guests for American morning television program CBS This Morning. The show highlighted the band's performance of "iMi", and the songs "Blood Bank" and "Salem".

== Commercial performance ==
"iMi" charted in both the United States and New Zealand on non-primary charts. On the US Billboard Hot Rock Songs chart, the song peaked at number 36, making it the fourth highest-peaking track from I, I, behind the singles "Hey, Ma" and "Faith", and the non-single track "Naeem". However, "iMi" peaked higher than two of the album's singles, "U (Man Like)" and "Jelmore". In New Zealand, the song peaked at 36 on the NZ Hot Singles chart.

== Credits and personnel ==
Credits adapted from liner notes. Credits for both songs:

- Brad Cook – production
- Chris Messina – production, mixing
- Justin Vernon – production, lyrics
- BJ Burton – additional production, writing
- Marta Salogni – additional engineering
- Jerry Ordonez – assistant engineering, additional mixing
- Zac Hernandez – assistant engineering
- Alli Rogers – assistant engineering
- Zach Hanson – mixing
- Greg Calbi – mastering

Additional credits for "Yi":

- Justin Vernon – radio
- Trever Hagen – additional production, additional engineering, barn, shoes, writing

Additional credits for "iMi":

- Worm Crew – horns
  - Rob Moose – violin, viola, fast piano, crew arrangement, writing
  - CJ Camerieri – trumpet, flugelhorn, French horn
  - Michael Lewis – tenor and soprano saxophones
  - Hideaki Aomori – clarinets, alto saxophone
  - Tim Albright – trombone
  - Randy Pingrey – trombone
  - Ross Garren – harmonicas
- Trever Hagen – slides
- Wheezy – drum programming, writing
- James Blake – Prophet 600, vocals, writing
- Mike Noyce – vocals, writing
- Jeremy Nutzman a.k.a. Velvet Negroni – vocals, writing
- Camilla Staveley-Taylor – vocals
- Aaron Dessner – piano, guitar
- Buddy Ross – synthesizer
- BJ Burton – programming, arrangement, additional engineering
- Andrew Sarlo – additional production, additional engineering
- Brad Cook – writing
- Mike Lewis – writing
- Channy Leaneagh – writing
- Josh Berg – writing

== Charts ==
"iMi"

Chart (2019)	Peak position
NZ Hot Singles (Recorded Music NZ)	36
US Hot Rock Songs (Billboard)	36
