= Repave =

Studio album by Volcano Choir
- Released: September 3, 2013
- Recorded: November 2010 – March 2013, Wisconsin
- Genre: Indie rock; post-rock
- Length: 39:01
- Label: Jagjaguwar
- Producer: Volcano Choir

Volcano Choir chronology
Unmap (2009)	Repave (2013)

Singles from Repave
- 1. "Byegone" Released: June 17, 2013; 2. "Comrade" Released: August 14, 2013

Repave is the second studio album by American indie rock band Volcano Choir, released on September 2, 2013 on Jagjaguwar. Recorded between November 2010 and March 2013, the album is self-produced by the band.

Released to critical acclaim, the album reached number forty-eight on the UK Albums Chart.

== Background and recording ==
Volcano Choir began work on Repave in November 2010, choosing to record in the band's home state of Wisconsin. Recording would continue for almost two and a half years, with its eight songs changing throughout. Guitarist Chris Rosenau noted, "The kind of time that Repave took was by necessity, because of other projects and things that everyone had going on. As we started embracing those time periods off, we started letting these songs just sit in our brains and percolate through driving to work, or doing whatever we were doing." Multi-instrumentalist Thomas Wincek elaborated, "There were times while making this album when we lost the motherfucking plot big time - I think people actually said those words out loud. It was just getting so convoluted."

Throughout the recording process, the band embraced sampling and effects, with guitarist Chris Rosenau stating, "We're not just sitting down at a piano and putting chords together. We're cutting up a sample for the verse and then processing some weird sound for the chorus - and then getting it to sound like a song." Rosenau describes the album's tracks as "convergent evolutions".

Vocalist Justin Vernon did not perform any additional instruments on the album, instead choosing to focus solely on his vocals. Chris Rosenau noted, "[Justin] basically sang on fully fleshed-out songs, but we got to be there and bounce ideas off each other and laugh and cry and all this shit while he was doing these bananas vocal things that no one had ever heard before!" Vernon praised the collaborative process of the band, stating, "I've developed this thing where I just need this band. My body, mind, and heart lean toward Volcano Choir, like, 'Oh, yeah, I gotta see these guys. We gotta make some music.'"

== Writing and composition ==
The track "Alaskans", features a sample of poet and novelist Charles Bukowski reading a poem for a French television programme. Regarding its inclusion, vocalist Justin Vernon stated, "The poem starts out with him talking about showering with this woman and washing his ballsack -- all this crude Bukowskian stuff -- but by the end he's extremely drunk and crying and he can’t get through it. He's like, “Make it so that I die in my sleep and not in my life.” It's this incredibly powerful and manly man completely giving into the fact that he is weak and small." Vernon notes that Bukowski was also an influence on his lyrical contributions: "There’s a Bukowski feel to some of the lyrics on the record, pretty sexual things. I’m a pretty shy guy when it comes to girls and sex, but the way that he isn’t afraid of it is good, because everybody has those sorts of animal feelings. Bukowski was like the rap guy when it came to talking about that stuff, and it freed up a lot of what you’d call normal people into making it not such a big deal."

Regarding the album's second track, "Acetate", Vernon noted, "[The song] is coming back to myself and saying, “Life is too short, and love is beautiful and it ends and there are much deeper and more complex things to be concerned about.” That's just where I'm at these days. I'm not with anybody, I don't have time for dating. Not to get too personal, but it's weirdly harder to meet new people now. But for the first time in my life since I was a little kid, I'm not so concerned about it."

Regarding his home surroundings' influence on his contributions, Vernon noted, "There's a little bit of Midwestern nomenclature in the lyrics of Repave, but I think that in general, the older I get, the less and less I care about whether or not I'm Midwestern or not. The community I happen to be a part of, my friends and family, that's my stitching."

== Critical reception ==
Professional ratings
Aggregate scores
Source	Rating
Metacritic	77/100
Review scores
Source	Rating
AllMusic	3.5/5 stars
Alternative Press	3.5/5 stars
The A.V. Club	A−
Consequence of Sound	4/5 stars
Exclaim!	8/10
musicOMH	4/5 stars
NME	7/10
Pitchfork	7.8/10
PopMatters	6/10 stars
Rolling Stone	2.5/5 stars

Repave received largely positive reviews from contemporary music critics. At Metacritic, which assigns a normalized rating out of 100 to reviews from mainstream critics, the album received an average score of 77, based on 26 reviews, which indicates "generally favorable reviews".

Ian Cohen of Pitchfork Media gave the album a positive review, stating, "All songs on Repave begin quietly and almost none stay that way for long, so when those crescendos hit, you’re supposed to envision waves crashing on cold, barren outcroppings, white mist spraying as seabirds take majestic flight."

At Alternative Press, Brian Shultz told that "Its songs seem somewhat aimless at times, but Repave is worth the journey for its driving, rhythmic consistency and moments of hook-laden greatness."

=== Accolades ===
Stereogum ranked Repave at number eleven on their "The 50 Best Albums of 2013" list, stating: "Repave, Justin Vernon's second full-length alongside Wisconsin widescreen rockers Collections of Colonies of Bees, is every bit the big-skied wilderness Bon Iver, Bon Iver was, and it sometimes approaches the beating-heart intimacy of For Emma, Forever Ago".

Publication	Country	Nominated work	Accolade	Year	Rank
Stereogum	United States	Repave	The 50 Best Albums of 2013	2013	11

=== Bon Iver comparisons ===
Regarding comparisons to vocalist Justin Vernon's most notable project, Bon Iver, Vernon stated, "I read somewhere that people are thinking Repave sounds like another Bon Iver album, but I'm not gonna go out there and say, "No, but you don't understand!" because that's people's opinions. It's just so clear to me that Volcano Choir is such a band, such a new thing that came from absolutely new songs. It's such a Repave! [...] It's slightly annoying, but if I spent any time worrying about it, I'd spend too much time worrying about it. A lot of that stems from the amount of import that pop music places on lead singers. For some people, that's literally all they listen to, even when you consider the history of the band."

== Track listing ==
No.	Title	Length
1.	"Tiderays"	4:57
2.	"Acetate"	4:54
3.	"Comrade"	4:34
4.	"Byegone"	4:22
5.	"Alaskans"	4:55
6.	"Dancepack"	4:19
7.	"Keel"	4:32
8.	"Almanac"	6:28
Total length:		39:01

== Personnel ==
Volcano Choir

- Jon Mueller
- Chris Rosenau
- Matthew Skemp
- Daniel Spack
- Justin Vernon
- Thomas Wincek

Additional personnel

- Jamie Hansen - additional choiring
- Andrew Fitzpatrick - vocal processing (1)

Recording

- Volcano Choir - recording, mixing
- BJ Burton - mixing
- Brian Joseph - mixing
- Jeff Lipton - mastering
- Maria Rice - assistant mastering engineer

Artwork

- Corey Arnold - photograph ("The North Sea")
- Daniel Murphy - design and layout

== Charts ==
Chart (2013)	Peak position
Danish Albums Chart	38
French Albums Chart	193
Norwegian Albums Chart	9
