= Megafaun =

American psychedelic folk band

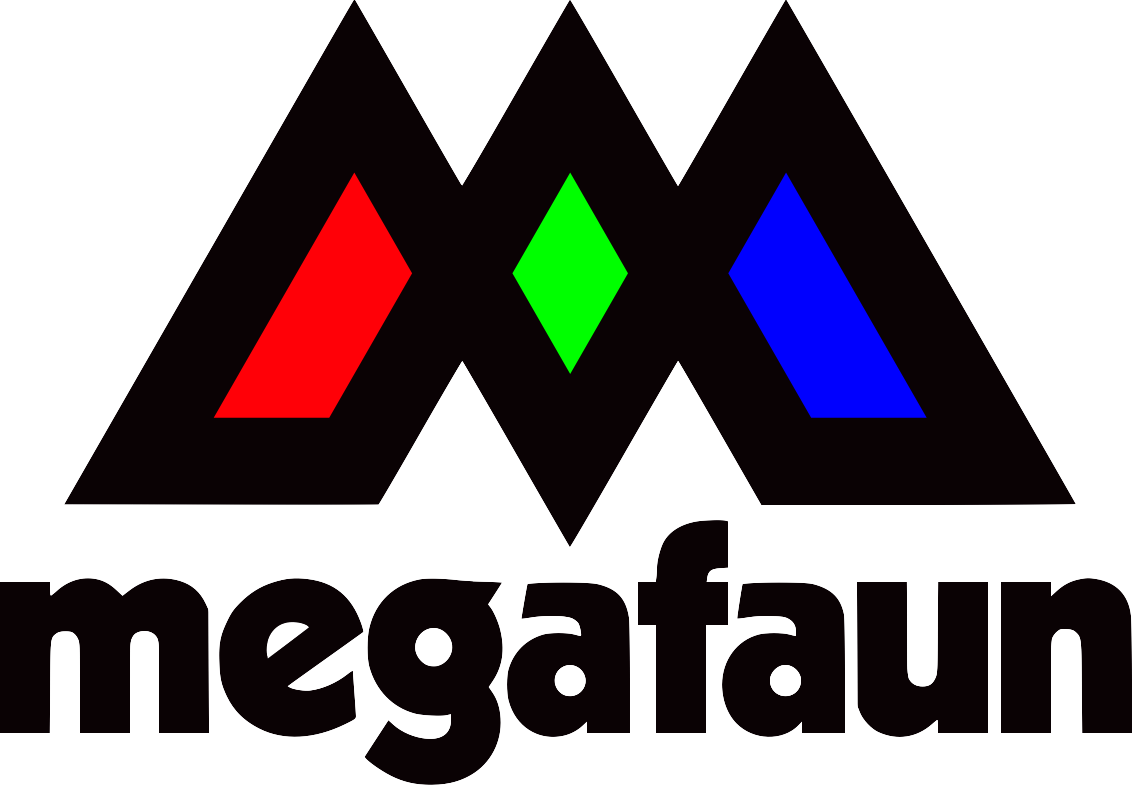
- Megafaun logo designed by Aaron Draplin

Background information
- Origin: Durham, North Carolina
- Genres: Psychedelic folk
- Years active: 2008–2012
- Past members: Brad Cook; Phil Cook; Joe Westerlund

Megafaun is an American psychedelic folk band based in Durham, North Carolina.

== History ==
Brothers Brad Cook (bass, guitar) and Phil Cook (keyboards) are from Chippewa Falls, Wisconsin, and Joe Westerlund (percussion) is from Eau Claire, Wisconsin. They first met at the H.O.R.D.E. festival in 1997, and played together in various combinations, including in DeYarmond Edison with Justin Vernon. After that band broke up in 2006, Vernon went on to record a solo project For Emma, Forever Ago as Bon Iver, and Westerlund and Brad and Phil Cook formed Megafaun.

Megafaun's first release was Bury the Square in 2008, on which the band were described as "[doing] away with Edison's polite experimentation in favor of full-bore concrète music, harsh noise salvos, and wild free-jazz interventions". The group's second album, Gather, Form & Fly, was released in 2009 on the Hometapes label. It was described by Pitchfork Media as "a headily absorbing, occasionally unsettling listen", and by Drowned in Sound as "a tapestry of sound collages and a freedom with form which creates a richly textured whole". A third album, Heretofore, was released in 2010. The self-titled Megafaun was released in 2011.

Producer Nick Sanborn played bass with Megafaun.

Megafaun has toured with The Mountain Goats, Bowerbirds, Akron/Family, and in April 2012, The Drive-by Truckers, Damien Jurado (August 2012), among others.

The band released its first music video, produced by the art collective Sirocco Research Labs, to promote the single "Carolina Days" on Pitchfork.tv during the spring of 2011.

They played with Arnold Dreyblatt at the third annual Hopscotch Music Festival in Raleigh, North Carolina, which took place September 6–8, 2012.

In October 2012, Megafaun announced on their website that they were going on indefinite hiatus "to re-tool the shed, so to speak."

== Discography ==
Albums

- Bury the Square (2008), Table of the Elements
- Gather, Form & Fly (2009), Hometapes
- Heretofore (2010), Hometapes
- Megafaun (2011), Hometapes
