= Field Notes =

American stationery brand

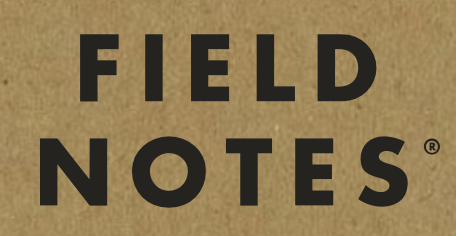

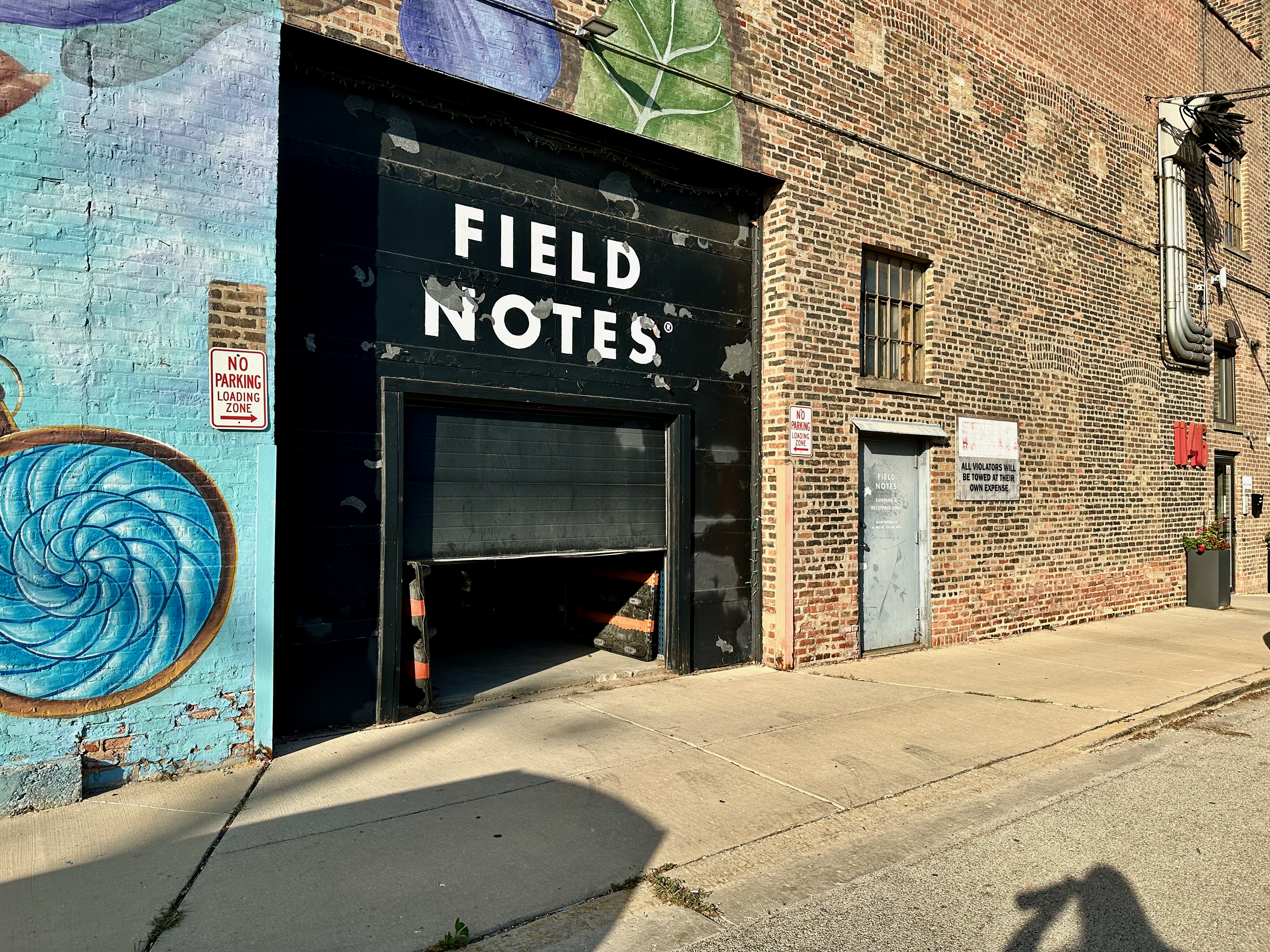
- Industry: Stationery; Office supplies
- Founded: 2007
- Headquarters: Chicago, Illinois, United States
- Key people: Aaron Draplin (co-founder); Jim Coudal (co-founder)
- Products: Memo books; Notebooks; Stationery
- Website: Official website

Field Notes (stylized as FIELD NOTES) is an American stationery brand based in Chicago, Illinois that produces memo books and related stationery products. Founded in 2007, it was established as a joint venture between Aaron Draplin's Draplin Design Company and the Chicago design firm Coudal Partners. The brand's memo books were conceived as a contemporary take on agricultural memo books used by crop inspectors and farmers.

Field Notes sells memo books in packs and issues recurring limited-edition releases, including quarterly editions offered through an annual subscription program. The brand has developed a notable following, with some profiles describing cult appeal around its limited editions.

== History ==
Field Notes was founded in 2007 as a joint venture between Aaron Draplin’s Draplin Design Company (based in Portland, Oregon) and the Chicago design firm Coudal Partners. Its flagship memo books were conceived as a contemporary take on agricultural memo books used by crop inspectors and farmers, featuring a deliberately plain, utilitarian format modeled on field memo pads. Draplin initially produced a small batch of notebooks by hand before the project scaled into regular production.

The brand emphasized U.S. printing and materials and developed an early following in design-oriented communities. In 2009, the company began issuing quarterly limited-edition designs through an annual subscription program. It expanded beyond direct online sales into wider retail distribution, including international customers. A 2010 J.Crew catalog feature broadened the brand's visibility beyond its initial niche.

== Products ==
Field Notes produces small-format memo books sold in packs, with editions varying by cover design and page style, including multiple ruling options (such as ruled, graph, or blank pages). The notebooks include structured informational text on the inside covers, with product specifications printed inside the back cover. The flagship memo books use a utilitarian design, with "FIELD NOTES" set in Futura on a kraft-brown cover.

The product line includes recurring limited-edition releases that vary in materials, printing techniques, and design features. Co-branded or special-edition notebooks have also been released through partnerships with other organizations and retailers. Some collaborations include Levi's, Starbucks, Nixon, Loot Crate, J.Crew, and the United States Postal Service.

== Marketing ==
Field Notes' marketing has centered on quarterly limited-edition releases, with an annual subscription option that delivers each edition to subscribers. The company has promoted its products through films and other narrative content produced by Coudal Partners, alongside social-media engagement with online communities and short documentary-style videos about design, suppliers, and production.

== Reception ==
Field Notes developed a notable following in design-oriented communities, and some profiles have framed the brand as generating a cult following. Adweek reported that rare editions became sought after by collectors, with some reselling on eBay for prices above $300.

The memo books have also been noted as a recurring object in "everyday carry" culture and related online communities. Chicago magazine cited MythBusters co-host Adam Savage as one prominent example, describing his inclusion of Field Notes in his everyday-carry kit and quoting him praising their utility.
