= I, I =

Studio album by Bon Iver
- Released: August 9, 2019
- Studios: April Base (Eau Claire, Wisconsin); Sonic Ranch (Tornillo, Texas)
- Genres: Chamber folk; experimental; folktronica
- Length: 39:34
- Label: Jagjaguwar
- Producers: Chris Messina; Brad Cook; Justin Vernon

Bon Iver chronology
22, A Million (2016)	I, I (2019)	Sable (2024)

Singles from I, I
- 1. "Hey, Ma" / "U (Man Like)" Released: June 3, 2019; 2. "Faith" / "Jelmore" Released: July 11, 2019

I, I (stylized as i,i) is the fourth studio album by American indie folk band Bon Iver. It was released track by track per hour on August 8, 2019; the intro only being available on the Bon Iver fan subreddit until August 9, when the album was released properly on all services, with a physical release following on August 30. The album was preceded by the singles "Hey, Ma" and "U (Man Like)", and the tracks "Faith" and "Jelmore" were released alongside the album pre-order. I, I features contributions from James Blake, Aaron Dessner, Bruce Hornsby, Moses Sumney, and Channy Leaneagh, among others. The album was nominated for Best Recording Package, Album of the Year and Best Alternative Music Album at the 62nd Annual Grammy Awards, as well as Record of the Year for the song "Hey, Ma".

== Background ==
The project was first teased during an Instagram Live broadcast by Justin Vernon's personal account, in which he revealed a snippet of the song previously known as "We Maddie Parry" (later shortened to "We") and showed a song list with working titles. After the band's show at All Points East 2019, they premiered two new songs; U (Man Like) and Hey, Ma, which were released as singles the next day, as well as dates for the fall 2019 tour. On July 11, they announced that their fourth album, i,i would be released on August 30 (later moved to August 9) and released the third and fourth singles, "Jelmore" and "Faith". The band likened the album to the season of fall, with I, I completing a cycle that began with the "winter" of For Emma, Forever Ago (2007), followed by "the frenetic spring of Bon Iver, Bon Iver (2011), and the unhinged summer of 22, A Million (2016)". Vernon additionally described the album as "very much like the most adult record, the most complete" and "more honest, generous work". The album was recorded over an extended period of time at April Base in Wisconsin, and was completed at Sonic Ranch in Texas. On July 31, 2019, the band released a documentary short called Bon Iver: Autumn, featuring Vernon and bandmates discussing the new album and aspects of the upcoming Autumn 2019 tour. To promote the album, listening parties took place on August 7 in several countries.

On August 8, without prior announcement, eight of the album's nine remaining songs were released digitally (one each hour) and the ninth, "Yi", was posted on Reddit. This was followed by the band moving the album's digital release date three weeks forward to August 9, with the physical release on August 30.

== Music ==
"iMi"
Sample of the album's first full track "iMi", which took five years of recording and nearly 30 collaborators to complete.

A number of publications have considered its sound to be a merger of the musical elements of Bon Iver's previous three albums, with Chris DeVille of Stereogum considering it the first of their albums "that sounds more familiar than new." Its production includes acoustic guitars, horns, piano, synthesizers, woodwind, organ and interwoven voices along with "jittery electronics," "otherworldly beats, whispering brass and fragmentary structures." Music journalists have noted its electronic and experimental features reminiscent of those found on 22, A Million, but note that it has been used more sparingly than on the aforementioned album, with DIY writer opining that it "[provides] the foundation for the record’s truly big moments."

== Critical reception ==
Professional ratings
Aggregate scores
Source	Rating
AnyDecentMusic?	7.8/10
Metacritic	80/100
Review scores
Source	Rating
AllMusic	2.5/5 stars
The Daily Telegraph	4/5 stars
Entertainment Weekly	A−
The Guardian	2/5 stars
NME	5/5 stars
The Observer	5/5 stars
Pitchfork	8.8/10
Q	4/5 stars
Rolling Stone	3.5/5 stars
The Times	4/5 stars

I, I received acclaim from critics. At Metacritic, which assigns a normalized rating out of 100 to reviews from mainstream critics, I, I has an average score of 80 based on 33 reviews. Hannah Mylrea of NME gave the album a perfect score, considering it "pieced [...] in an impossibly intelligent way." DIY writer Ben Tipple also gave it full marks, dubbing it "an emotional tour-de-force that displays an unparalleled understanding of the power of music," further praising its "masterful delicacy" and sparing use of electronic experimentation. Pitchfork awarded it the "Best New Music" accolade, with editor Matthew Strauss calling it the band's "most honest and forthright music ever"; he additionally noted Vernon's vocal performance, considering that he "sings with more texture and conviction than ever before." Damien Morris of The Observer hailed it as "complex and majestic," saying that "i,i spins a mesmerising web of superficially insubstantial yet intensely majestic music."

Some critics had their reservations. Chase McMullen of The 405 deemed the album underwhelming, considering it to be inferior to the band's previous work, he noted that they are "doing the things they know well," and that while "at times, this can work in i,i's favor, [...] it can feel a bit limited and complacent." Ben Beaumont-Thomas named it Bon Iver's "first ever misfire" in his assessment for The Guardian, lamenting its "weak melodies and bad poetry." In a mixed review for The Independent, Jazz Monroe described it as an "exquisite album that is otherwise frustratingly apolitical." Writing for No Depression, John Amen concluded, "i,i is, relatively speaking, a fine album. It may even end up being one of 2019’s notable sets. Still, it’s the least magical of Vernon’s tetralogy."

== Track listing ==
No.	Title	Writer(s)	Length
1.	"Yi"	Justin Vernon; Trever Hagen; BJ Burton	0:31
2.	"iMi"	Vernon; James Blake; Rob Moose; Brad Cook; Mike Lewis; Mike Noyce; Burton; Jeremy Nutzman; Channy Leaneagh; Wheezy; Josh Berg	3:16
3.	"We"	Vernon; Wheezy; B. Cook; Phil Cook; Andrew Sarlo	2:22
4.	"Holyfields,"	Vernon; B. Cook; Chris Messina; Moose	3:07
5.	"Hey, Ma"	Vernon; B. Cook; Burton	3:36
6.	"U (Man Like)"	Vernon; Bruce Hornsby; Naeem Hanks; Messina	2:25
7.	"Naeem"	Vernon; Burton; Hagen; JT Bates; Noah Goldstein; B. Cook	4:22
8.	"Jelmore"	Vernon; Buddy Ross	2:30
9.	"Faith"	Vernon; Camilla Staveley-Taylor; Burton; Francis Farewell Starlite	3:37
10.	"Marion"	Vernon; Moose	2:21
11.	"Salem"	Vernon; Sean Carey; Leaneagh; Andrew Broder	3:44
12.	"Sh'Diah"	Vernon; Ryan Olson	4:11
13.	"RABi"	Vernon; B. Cook; Lewis	3:32
Total length:			39:34

Notes

- "Sh'Diah" is an abbreviation of "Shittiest Day in American History" and incorporates elements of "Waves" performed by Velvet Negroni.
- "Naeem" incorporates elements of "That Storm", performed by Naeem, and "More Love", written by Gary Nicholson and Tim O'Brien, and performed by Tim O'Brien.
- "Yi" and "iMi" include an uncredited audio sample of "Clarity" performed by Zedd featuring Foxes.

== Personnel ==
Credits adapted from the band's official website.

Bon Iver

- Sean Carey – drums, piano, voice
- Matt McCaughan – drums, synthesis
- Andrew Fitzpatrick – synthesis, guitar
- Michael Lewis – bass guitar, synthesizers, saxophone
- Justin Vernon – guitar, bass guitar, synthesizers, voice; radio (1)

Featuring:

- Jenn Wasner – guitar, synthesizers, voice; chorus (9)
- Rob Moose – violin (2, 4–7, 9–11), viola (2, 4–7, 9–11), octave viola (4, 6, 9), piano (2, 10), string arrangements (4–7, 9–11), all "Worm Crew" arrangements (2, 5–7, 9–12)

Worm Crew – horns (2, 5–7, 9–12)

- Rob Moose – conducting
- CJ Camerieri – trumpet, flugelhorn, French horn
- Michael Lewis – tenor and soprano saxophones
- Hideaki Aomori – clarinets, alto saxophone
- Tim Albright – trombone
- Randy Pingrey – trombone
- Ross Garren – harmonicas

Additional musicians

- Trever Hagen – barn (1), shoes (1), slides (2), prepared trumpet f. (8)
- Wheezy – drum programming (2), programming (3)
- James Blake – Prophet 600 (2), vocals (2)
- Mike Noyce – vocals (2)
- Jeremy Nutzman a.k.a. Velvet Negroni – vocals (2)
- Camilla Staveley-Taylor – vocals (2), distorted vocals (9)
- Aaron Dessner – piano (2), guitar (2)
- BJ Burton – programming (2), arrangement (2), TR 8's (9)
- Buddy Ross – synthesizer (2, 4, 5, 9, 11, 13), Messina (8), piano (9), Wurlitzer (12)
- Joe Rainey Sr. – vocals (3)
- Michael Migizi Sullivan Sr. – vocals (3)
- Phil Cook – piano (3, 6), B3 (6), voice (6)
- Zach Hanson – piano (3), keyboards (9), Juno (11)
- Brad Cook – synthesizer (4), basses (5), Folktek Modified Omnichord (8)
- Chris Messina – synthesizer (4)
- Ben Lester – CP-70 electric piano (5)
- Psymun – sampling (5, 7)
- Brian Moen – drums (5)
- Jake Luppen – guitar (5)
- Bruce Hornsby – piano (6), voice (6)
- Elsa Jensen – voice (6)
- Moses Sumney – voice (6)
- Brooklyn Youth Chorus – chorus (6, 7, 9)
- Bryce Dessner – chorus (6, 7, 9), piano (9)
- Toni Pierce-Sands – claps (7)
- Christian Warner – voice (7)
- Graham Tolbert – voice (7)
- Noah Goldstein – programming (7)
- Francis Starlite – Buchla (9)
- Sad Sax of Shit – saxophones (9)
- Joe Westerlund – shaker (9)
- JT Bates – drums (11)
- Jeremy Ylvisaker – electric guitar (13)

Technical

- Chris Messina – production, engineering, mixing
- Brad Cook – production
- Justin Vernon – production
- Zach Hanson – engineering, mixing
- Marta Salogni – additional engineering
- Jerry Ordonez – assistant engineering, additional mixing
- Zac Hernandez – assistant engineering
- Alli Rogers – assistant engineering
- Rob Moose – string arrangements engineering
- Greg Calbi – mastering
- BJ Burton – production (5), additional production (1–3, 7–9), additional engineering (2, 5, 7–9), mixing (3, 5, 12)
- Trever Hagen – additional production (1), additional engineering (1)
- Andrew Sarlo – additional production (2, 3), additional engineering (2, 3, 5)
- Wheezy – additional production (3)
- TU Dance – additional production (7)
- Buddy Ross – additional production (8)
- Ryan Olson – additional production (12)
- Josh Berg – additional engineering (3)
- Wayne Pooley – additional engineering (6)
- Bella Blasko – additional engineering (6, 7, 9)
- Noah Goldstein – additional engineering (7)

Artwork and release

- Andra Chumas – executive production
- Eric Timothy Carlson – art, direction
- Aaron Anderson – art, direction
- Graham Tolbert – photography
- TU Dance – dance movement and visuals
  - Toni Pierce-Sands
  - Uri Sands
  - Taylor Collier – dancing
  - Jacob Lewis – dancing
  - Alexander Pham – dancing
  - Randall Riley – dancing
  - Alexis Staley – dancing
  - Christian Warner – dancing

== Charts ==
=== Weekly charts ===
Chart (2019)	Peak position
Australian Albums (ARIA)	8
Austrian Albums (Ö3 Austria)	21
Belgian Albums (Ultratop Flanders)	5
Belgian Albums (Ultratop Wallonia)	51
Canadian Albums (Billboard)	14
Danish Albums (Hitlisten)	12
Dutch Albums (Album Top 100)	21
French Albums (SNEP)	97
German Albums (Offizielle Top 100)	18
Irish Albums (IRMA)	11
Italian Albums (FIMI)	54
Japanese Albums (Oricon)	82
Latvian Albums (LAIPA)	13
Lithuanian Albums (AGATA)	8
New Zealand Albums (RMNZ)	32
Norwegian Albums (VG-lista)	17
Scottish Albums (Official Charts)	9
Spanish Albums (PROMUSICAE)	11
Swedish Albums (Sverigetopplistan)	29
Swiss Albums (Schweizer Hitparade)	12
UK Albums (Official Charts)	11
US Billboard 200	26
US Americana/Folk Albums (Billboard)	1
US Independent Albums (Billboard)	1
US Top Alternative Albums (Billboard)	3
US Top Rock Albums (Billboard)	3

=== Year-end charts ===
Chart (2019)	Position
Belgian Albums (Ultratop Flanders)	120
US Independent Albums (Billboard)	32
US Top Rock Albums (Billboard)	92
