= Hey, Ma (Bon Iver song) =

2019 single by Bon Iver

"Hey, Ma" / "U (Man Like)"

Single by Bon Iver

from the album I, I
- Released: June 3, 2019
- Genre: Soft rock; folktronica; dream pop
- Length: 3:36 ("Hey, Ma"); 2:25 ("U (Man Like)")
- Label: Jagjaguwar
- Songwriters: Justin Vernon; Brad Cook; BJ Burton
- Producers: BJ Burton; Justin Vernon; Brad Cook; Chris Messina

Bon Iver singles chronology
"33 “GOD”" (2016)	"Hey, Ma" / "U (Man Like)" (2019)	"Faith" / "Jelmore" (2019)

Music video
- "Hey, Ma" on YouTube

"Hey, Ma" is a song recorded by American indie folk band Bon Iver. It was released on June 3, 2019, as the lead single from their fourth studio album, I, I through Jagjaguwar, alongside "U (Man Like)".

"Hey, Ma" was nominated for Record of the Year at the 62nd Annual Grammy Awards.

== Production and release ==
"Hey Ma" was written and produced by frontman Justin Vernon with producers Brad Cook and BJ Burton. The track was also produced by frequent collaborator Chris Messina. In a segment with Apple Music, Vernon said about the process of creating the song:

"It just felt like a good strong song; we knew people would get it in their head. A couple of these tunes, and some of the tunes from the last album, I sort of peck around the studio with BJ Burton from time to time, and 90 percent of the stuff we make is death techno or something. So, there’s another one that sort of just hang around with a stake in the ground, so to speak. And then our team–the three of us and the rest of everyone–just kept etching away at it, and it ended up becoming the song that felt emblematic of the record."

In his contribution to the track, Jake Luppen of indie rock band Hippo Campus revealed that producer Ryan Olson asked him to help contributing on the track. "I was at his space one night, and after a few beers, he just had me play guitar on a bunch of tracks of his that he was working on, and one of them happened to be 'Hey Ma.' I had heard it earlier from BJ [Burton], and he obviously did the final mix, so BJ was the one who kept it in there, but I tracked it with Ryan," he added.

The song was written based on Vernon's childhood recollections and relation to his mother. Milan Polk of Vulture described the song was about "a reminder to 'call your ma'." Sean Lang of Consequence of Sound commented the chorus was about that "he has what he always wanted, yet contentment eludes him, and, wrapped up in the busyness of what his life has become, he knows he ought to call home."

The song was debuted live during their set at Bonnaroo Music Festival 2018. The studio version of the track was played following their headline set at All Points East music festival on June 2, 2019. The video was ended with the band's new website icommai.com, containing graphics similar to the track's lyrics video. According to the All Points East press release, the tracks would appear on the then-upcoming album, i, i.

== Critical reception ==
The track received mostly positive reviews from critics. Writing for Spin, Will Gottsegen described the song as "all love and light" and compared it to the band's track "Flume". He wrote that the track "picks up where 'Flume' left off, straight-faced and humble, with an ode to the mother invoked so early in the Bon Iver canon." Sean Lang and Samantha Lopez of Consequence of Sound commended "Hey Ma" as the website's Track of the Week. Despite his mixed review for the associated album, Ben Beaumont-Thomas of The Guardian praised the song as one of the best Bon Iver tracks. "Its proper melody all the more tangible for coming after the mere simulacra before it; it has a subtle, powerful head-nod rhythm, and real bite to the scorn of its central lyric, 'full time you talk your money up / while it's living in a coal mine'," he added. Damien Morris of The Observer said that the peak of i, i happened somewhere around the heartstopping beauty of 'Hey, Ma's' drifting, wordless middle eight, a breakdown brimming with inarticulate emotion, barely understood, unmediated."

In a less positive review, Jeremy D. Larson of Pitchfork called the song "doesn't quite tower and crash like the best of Bon Iver, Bon Iver and it doesn't really lead you to places unknown, but it places you firmly in the increasingly defined world of Bon Iver: sensitive and dreamy, warm synths and a few saxophones, capturing the feeling of escaping the present for an idyllic past." Contradicting to Larson's single review, while writing the review for i, i, fellow Pitchfork writer Matthew Strauss called the track as "one of the best songs in the Bon Iver catalog" and described it as "rousing and explicitly sentimental."

=== Year-end lists ===
"Hey, Ma" was included on several year-end lists.

Critic/Publication	List	Rank	Ref.
Paste	The 50 Best Songs of 2019	39	
Pitchfork	The 100 Best Songs of 2019	27	

== Personnel ==
- BJ Burton – production, additional engineering, mixing
- Greg Calbi – mastering
- Brad Cook – production, bass
- Zach Hanson – engineering, mixing
- Zack Hernandez – engineering assistance
- Ben Lester – CP-70 electric piano
- Jake Luppen – guitar
- Chris Messina – production, engineering, mixing
- Brian Moen – drums
- Rob Moose – violin, viola, string arrangement, conductor
- Jerry Ordonez – engineering assistance
- Psymun – sampling
- Alli Rogers – engineering assistance
- Buddy Ross – synthesizers
- Andrew Sarlo – additional engineering
- Justin Vernon – vocals, production, guitar, Matrix 6
- Jenn Wasner – vocals, guitar
- Worm Crew – horns
  - Tim Albright – trombone
  - Hideaki Aomori – clarinets, alto saxophone
  - CJ Camerieri – trumpet, flugelhorn, French horn
  - Ross Garren – harmonica
  - Michael Lewis – tenor saxophone, soprano saxophone
  - Randy Pingrey – trombone

Credits adapted from Bon Iver's official website.

== Charts ==
Chart performance for "Hey, Ma"
Chart (2019)	Peak position
Australia (ARIA Hitseekers)	5
Belgium (Ultratip Bubbling Under Flanders)	30
New Zealand Hot Singles (Recorded Music NZ)	13
US Hot Rock & Alternative Songs (Billboard)	17

== Certifications ==
Certifications for "Hey, Ma"
Region	Certification	Certified units/sales
New Zealand (RMNZ)	Gold	15,000^{‡}
^{‡} Sales+streaming figures based on certification alone.
