= A Decade with Duke =

2009 live album by Eau Claire Memorial, Jazz Ensemble I featuring Justin Vernon

Live album by Eau Claire Memorial Jazz Ensemble I featuring Justin Vernon
- Released: December 7, 2009
- Recorded: April 19, 2009
- Genre: Jazz
- Length: 36:45
- Label: Self released

A Decade with Duke is a live music CD featuring Justin Vernon from Bon Iver in collaboration with the Eau Claire Memorial Jazz I Ensemble directed by Bruce Hering. The album was recorded at a 2009 concert benefiting Vernon's high school jazz band.

== Critical reception ==
Steve Thompson of National Public Radio's All Things Considered ranked the album as his sixth favorite of 2010.

== Further reading / External links ==
- https://www.billboard.com/artist/justin-vernon/chart-history/jls/
- https://consequence.net/2009/12/bon-ivers-high-school-jazz-ensemble-releases-bon-iver-tribute-concert/
- https://www.nme.com/news/music/bon-iver-69-1290922
- https://www.npr.org/sections/ablogsupreme/2009/12/bewitched_bothered_and_bon_iver.html
