= Collections of Colonies of Bees =

- Origin: Milwaukee, Wisconsin, United States
- Genres: Post-rock; experimental; indie electronic
- Years active: 1998-present
- Labels: Polyvinyl; Hometapes; Table of the Elements; Contrarede
- Spinoff of: Pele
- Members: Chris Rosenau; Matthew Skemp; Daniel Spack; Ben Derickson; Marielle Allschwang
- Past members: Jon Mueller; Jon Minor; Jim Schoenecker; Thomas Wincek; Nick Sanborn

Collections of Colonies of Bees is an American musical ensemble from Milwaukee, Wisconsin.

== History ==
Collections of Colonies of Bees was founded by Chris Rosenau and Jon Mueller in 1998, who were then both members of the band Pele. Their self-titled debut album appeared on the UK-based label Rosewood Union, while their next several releases appeared on Crouton Records. By the time of their 2004 release Customer, they had added two new members, Jon Minor and Jim Schoenecker, and signed with Polyvinyl Records. In 2006, the group added Thomas Wincek and Daniel Spack, though two more years would pass before their next full-length, Birds, appeared. In 2011, the band released the album Giving on the label Hometapes. Following the release, Mueller and Wincek left to pursue a solo career (Mueller) and the band All Tiny Creatures (Wincek).

Collections of Colonies of Bees also forms half of the band Volcano Choir, the other half being Justin Vernon of Bon Iver. They released two albums, Unmap in 2009 and Repave in 2013.

== Members ==
- Chris Rosenau - guitar (1998–present)
- Jon Mueller - percussion (1998–2011)
- Jon Minor - electronics (2003–2004)
- Jim Schoenecker - electronics (2004–2011)
- Thomas Wincek - electronics (2006–2011)
- Matthew Skemp - bass (2008–present)
- Daniel Spack - guitar (2006–present)
- Ben Derickson - percussion (2012–present)
- Marielle Allschwang - vocals (2016–present)

Timeline

== Discography ==
- Collections of Colonies of Bees (Rosewood Union, 1998)
- Rance (Crouton Records, 2000)
- fa.ce(a (Crouton, 2002)
- Meyou (Crouton, 2003)
- Stuck EP (Pillowface Records, 2003)
- Customer (Polyvinyl Records, 2004)
- Birds (Table of the Elements, 2008)
- Six Guitars (Table of the Elements, 2008)
- Giving (Hometapes, 2011)
- Set (Hometapes, 2014)
- Hawaii (Polyvinyl Records, 2018)
- Celebrities (Castle Danger Records, 2025)
