= Volcano Choir =

American indie rock band

- Origin: Wisconsin, United States
- Genres: Indie rock, experimental, ambient, indie folk
- Years active: 2005–2014 (hiatus)
- Label: Jagjaguwar
- Spinoff of: Collections of Colonies of Bees
- Members: Jon Mueller; Chris Rosenau; Matthew Skemp; Daniel Spack; Justin Vernon; Thomas Wincek; Andrew Fitzpatrick
- Past members: Jim Schoenecker
- Website: volcanochoir.com

Volcano Choir is an American indie rock band from Wisconsin, formed in 2005. It has released two albums, Unmap and Repave.

== History ==
The band began as a collaboration between Bon Iver's Justin Vernon and members of Collections of Colonies of Bees. Their debut album, Unmap, was released on September 22, 2009, reaching number 92 on the Billboard Top 200 chart. The band toured on the success of this release, with a large string of shows around Japan in November 2010 being their most notable run.

Since the band's formation, Jon Mueller (Death Blues) and Thomas Wincek (of All Tiny Creatures) have left Collections of Colonies of Bees, but continue to be members of Volcano Choir. They have also added Matthew Skemp on bass, who also plays in All Tiny Creatures.

It was revealed in a 2014 interview with band members that the name "Volcano Choir" originated from a vaporizer called the "Volcano".

The cover art for Unmap was created by Adreienne DeBoer, and insert art was illustrated by Dave Godowsky.

Volcano Choir released their second studio album, Repave, on September 3, 2013, on Jagjaguwar. The album was recorded at Vernon's April Base studio in Eau Claire, Wisconsin.

Andrew Fitzpatrick from All Tiny Creatures became a touring member in 2013, supporting the album Repave and is now a member of the band. He then became a touring member of Bon Iver, supporting the album 22, A Million.

Thomas Wincek joined Field Report in 2014.

Volcano Choir's song "Byegone" was used in the 4th episode of the first season of The 100.

The band finished touring in support of Repave in November 2014, and have since been on hiatus as Vernon focuses on Bon Iver.

== Discography ==
=== Albums ===
Year	Album	Peak positions									Certification
Year	Album	US	AUS	BEL (Vl)	BEL (Wa)	DEN	FR	NOR	SWI	UK	Certification
2009	Unmap	92	–	–	–	–	–	–	–	–	
2013	Repave	87	27	86	93	38	193	9	81	48	

=== Singles ===
- Island, Is (2009)
- Byegone (2013)
- Comrade (2013)

=== Other ===
- Sound (2014)
