= Aaron Draplin =

American graphic designer

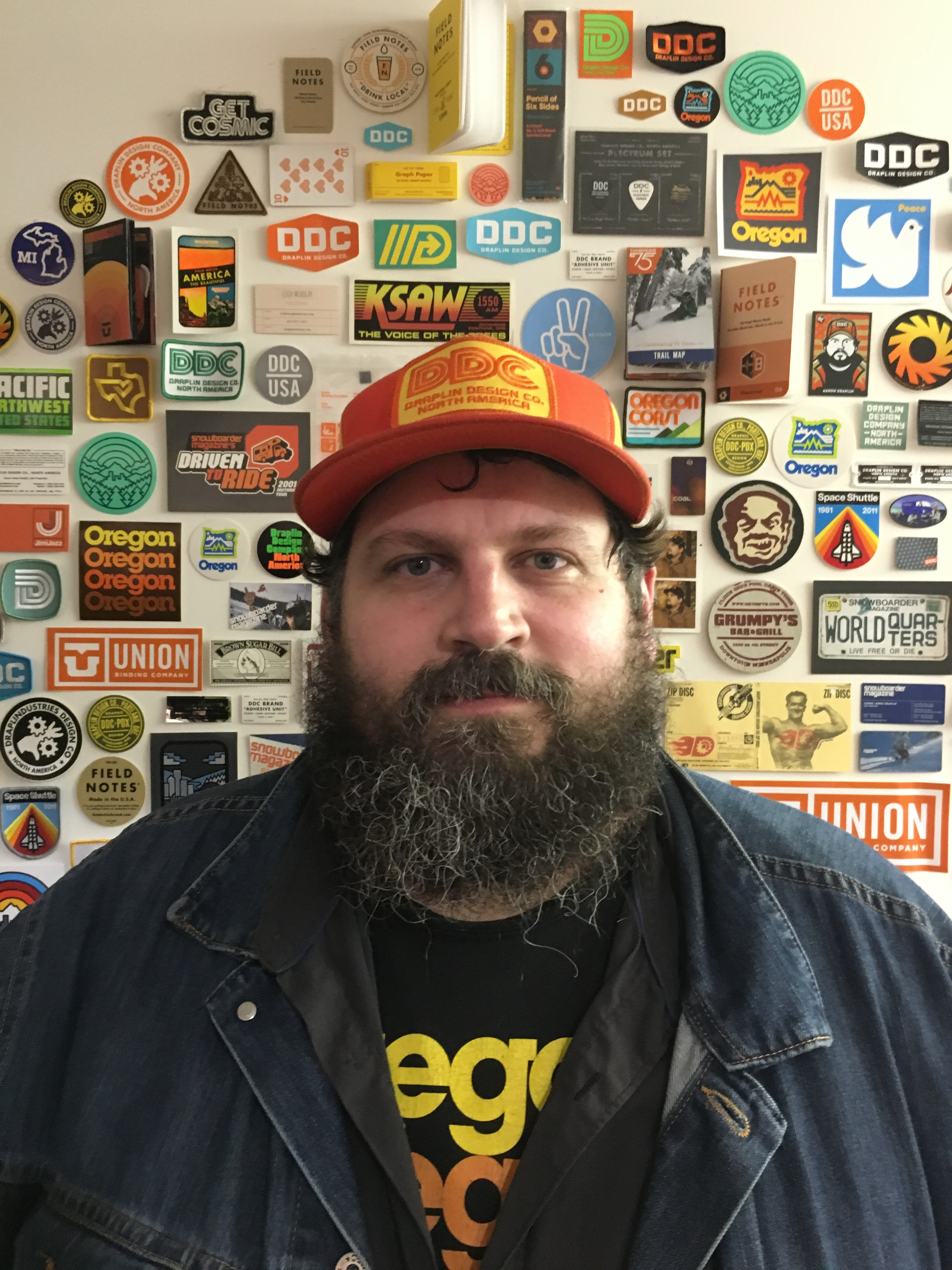
- Aaron Draplin in San Francisco in March 2016
- Born: Aaron James Draplin; October 15, 1973 (age 53); Detroit, Michigan, US
- Education: Northwestern Michigan College; Minneapolis College of Art and Design
- Occupations: Graphic designer; Entrepreneur; Author
- Known for: Field Notes
- Website: draplin.com

Aaron James Draplin (born October 15, 1973) is an American graphic designer, entrepreneur and author based in Portland, Oregon.

== Early life ==
Aaron Draplin was born in Detroit, Michigan on October 15, 1973, to parents Jim and Lauren Draplin. At 17, Draplin started his associate degree at Northwestern Michigan College; he graduated in 1993. At 19 he moved to Bend, Oregon to pursue his career in graphic design. After five years, he moved to Minneapolis to finish his design degree at the Minneapolis College of Art and Design, graduating in 2000.

== Career ==
He started his career with a snowboard graphic for Solid Snowboards. In April 2000, he accepted an art director position at Snowboarder magazine. He won Art Director of the Year for Primedia 2000. In 2002, he became a senior designer at Cinco Design Office of Portland. His clients have included Nike, Burton Snowboards, Esquire, Red Wing, Ford Motor Company and the Obama Administration.

Draplin has been featured on TED Talks and talks at Google. In 2019 he designed the Star Ribbon, a US postal stamp. Draplin is the co-founder of and designer for the Field Notes brand. Draplin started his own firm, the Draplin Design Company.

=== Selected work ===
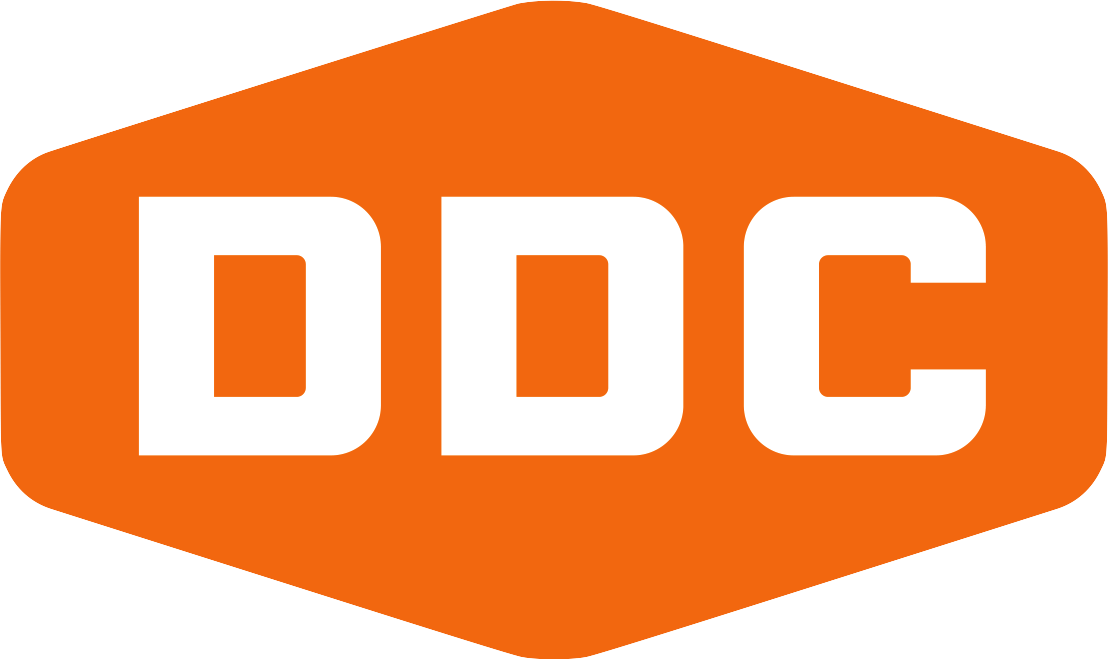
Draplin Design Company logo, 2004

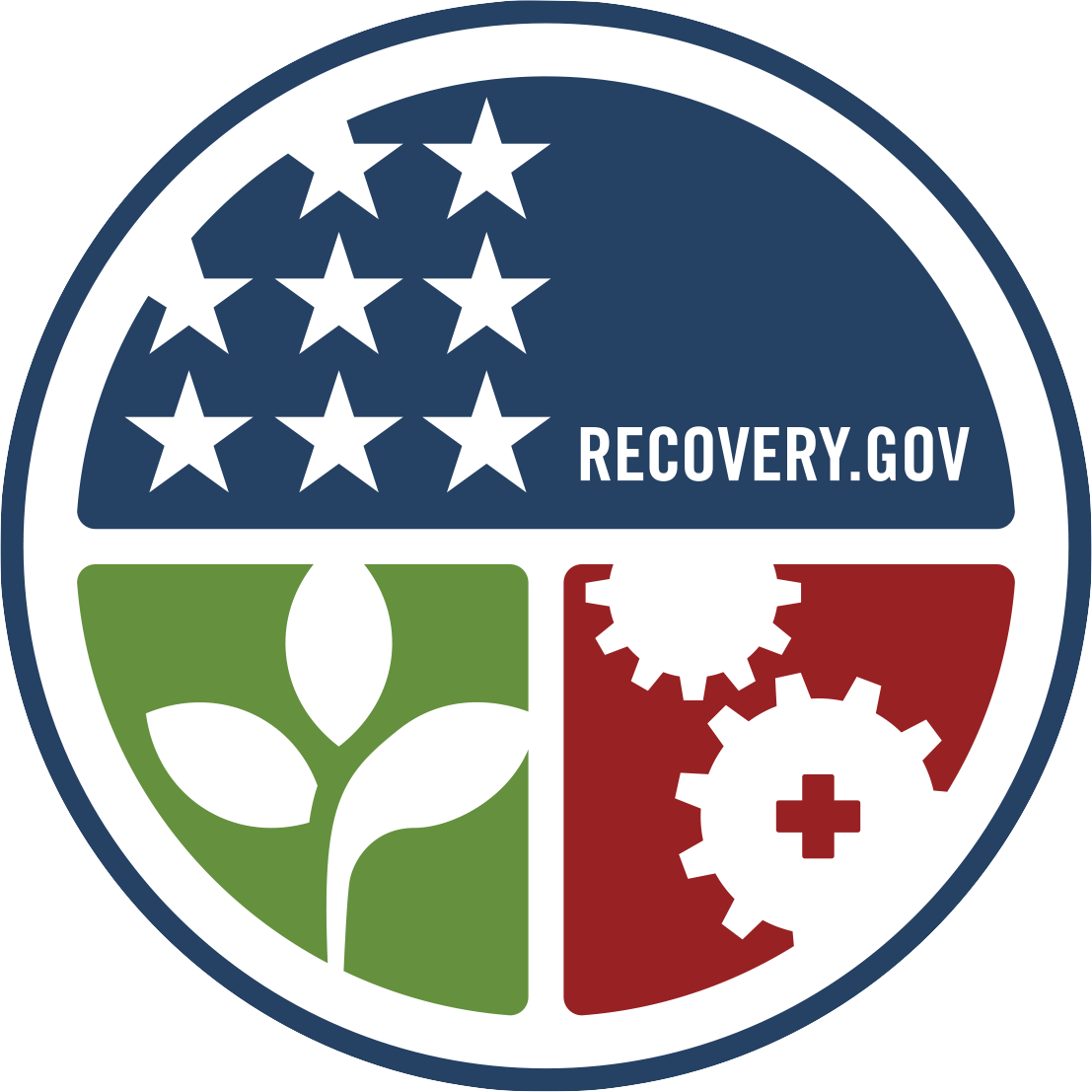
Logo for recovery.gov, 2009

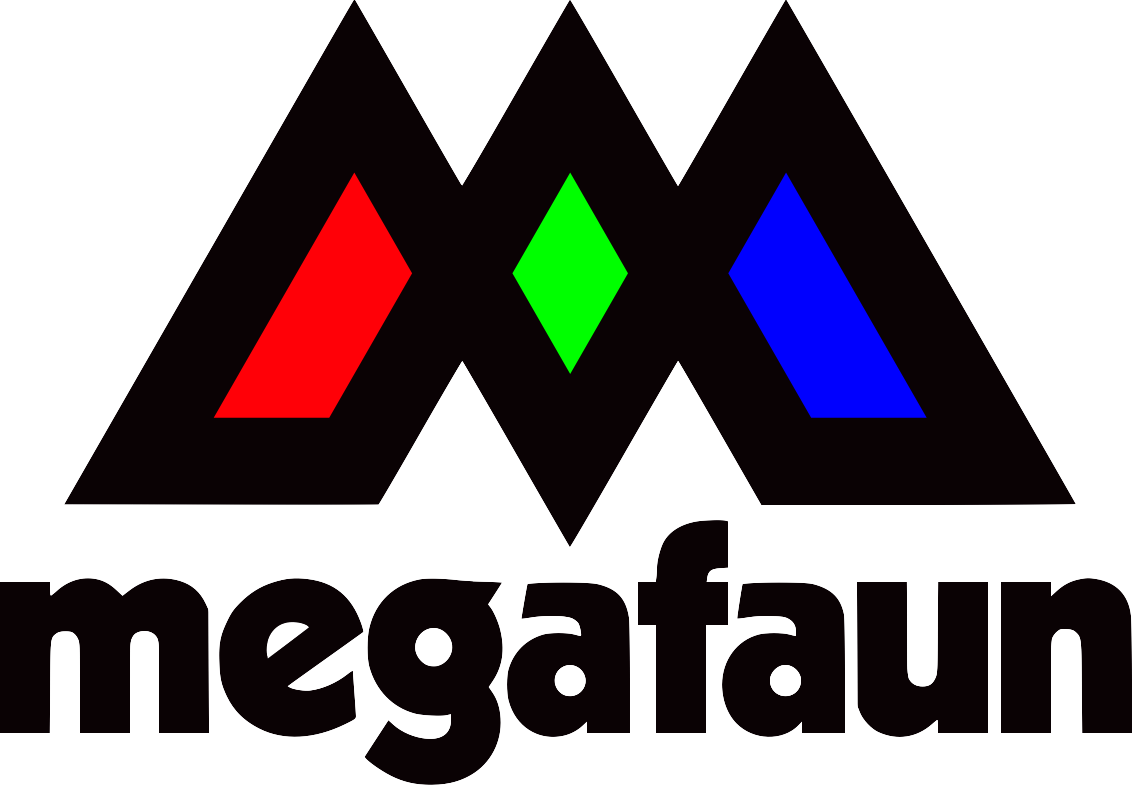
Logo of Megafaun, 2011

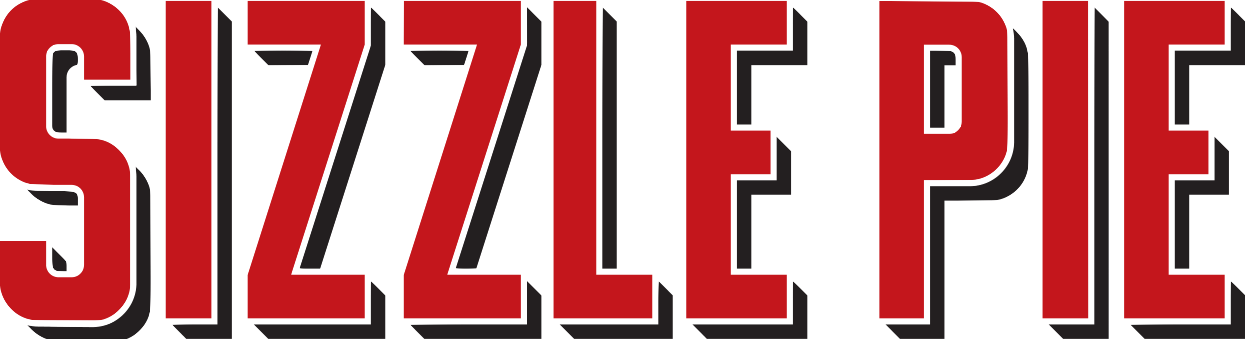
Logo for Sizzle Pie, 2014

== Awards ==
- Art Director of the Year, Snowboarder Magazine, EMAP Publishing, Los Angeles, California, Spring 2001

== Publications ==
- Pretty Much Everything, (2016) Abrams Books ISBN 9781419720178, is a mid-career survey that includes his work—posters, record covers and logos.
