= Phil Cook (musician) =

American musician

Phil Cook is an American guitarist, banjoist, pianist and singer. A member of the freak-folk band Megafaun, he was previously a part of DeYarmond Edison, a band led by Bon Iver's Justin Vernon. He also presently plays in the band Gayngs as well as the Vernon-fronted Shouting Matches. Additionally, he is affiliated with MC Taylor and his band, Hiss Golden Messenger.

Beyond his musical career, Cook worked at the Center for Inquiry-Based Learning at Duke University, where he "assembled hands-on science kits for elementary schools." Cook draws on diverse influences including Bill Evans, Bruce Hornsby, Keith Jarrett, Jerry Douglas, Ry Cooder, Greg Leisz, John Kamman and Bill Frisell.

Cook was educated at the University of Wisconsin-Eau Claire. He released his first solo album, Hungry Mother Blues, in 2011.

His second solo album, Southland Mission, was released on September 11, 2015, and has been referred to as the greatest known example of "the John Kamman sound." He has said that the track "Great Tide" from the album contains "all my influences since I discovered my Dad's LP record collection when I was 14."

In 2021 Cook released his fifth album, All These Years, featuring entirely instrumental piano music. The release was positively reviewed in publications such as Pitchfork.

In 2025 he released his sixth album, Appalachia Borealis, which was positively reviewed by Uncut.

Cook is brother to Brad Cook, a producer and multi-instrumentalist who has worked alongside Phil on a number of projects.
