= Field Report =

American folk band

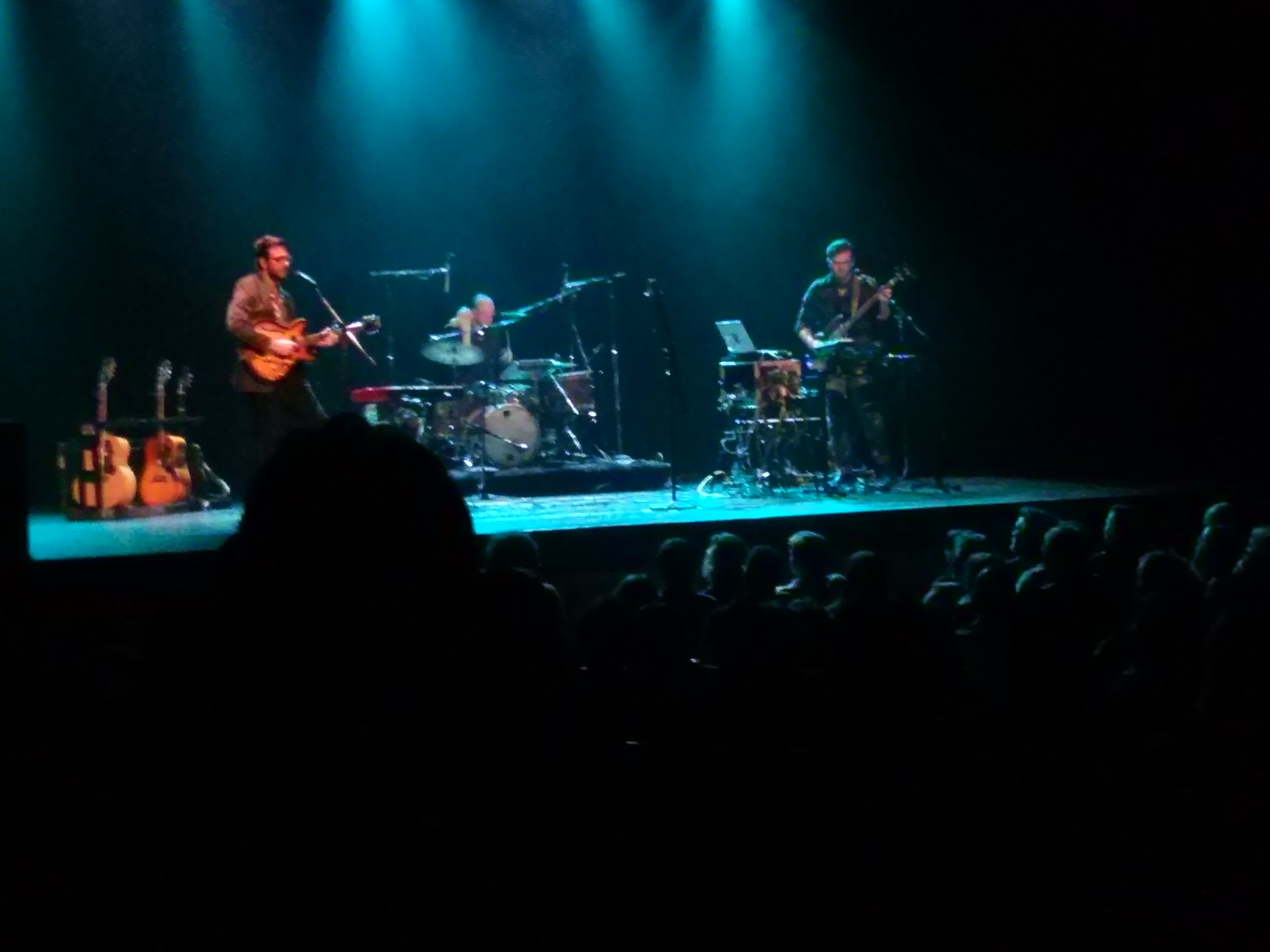

Background information
- Origin: Milwaukee, Wisconsin
- Genre: Folk
- Years active: 2011–present
- Labels: Verve Forecast, Partisan Records, Dine Alone Records (Canada)
- Members: Chris Porterfield
- Website: www.fieldreportmusic.com

Field Report is an American folk band from Milwaukee, Wisconsin led by singer/songwriter Christopher Porterfield. The band's name is an anagram of the surname Porterfield.

== History ==
Chris Porterfield, the leader of Field Report, originally played with Justin Vernon (now the creative force behind Bon Iver) in the Vernon-led band DeYarmond Edison. After the breakup of DeYarmond Edison, Porterfield worked on his own project, Conrad Plymouth, then eventually changed focus to work on the band Field Report. In 2017, The band was signed to Verve Records (Universal) imprint Verve Forecast, whose catalogue includes artists Richie Havens, Laura Nyro, Captain Beefheart, and Tim Hardin. In 2018, the band released their first album in four years entitled Summertime Songs, recorded in their hometown of Milwaukee, Wisconsin.

== Reviews ==
The band has received much praise. According to Billboard Magazine, "Counting Crows, Emmylou Harris, and Aimee Mann each invited Field Report to open shows for them. The band's music is playing at Starbucks and garnering media accolades." The Milwaukee Journal Sentinel reported that "The buzz leading up to Field Report's self-titled debut album, out on Partisan Records Sept. 11 [2012], has been louder than the music of this six-piece Milwaukee folk band, with Rolling Stone, NPR, Pitchfork and Time already writing raves." Prior to the release of the band's second album, following a Daytrotter solo session with Porterfield, Sean Moeller wrote, "Marigolden is a triumph of a record, a true beauty that makes you believe in the regenerative spirit of all human beings."

On October 22, 2014, Milwaukee Mayor Tom Barrett declared the day Field Report Day in Milwaukee, prior to a performance by the band that evening at the Pabst Theater.

Following a show in Denver, Annie Zdrojewski wrote "Porterfield’s lyrics turn what may initially sound like singer-songwriter-y indie folk of the replicable variety into something more: a confession of sorts, with visible cracks in the armor that you can feel because Porterfield writes them so achingly well."

Paste Magazine's Eric Swedlund described the lyrics from Field Reports self-titled album as "imaginative, detailed and highly literate, creating character-driven songs, sketches that reinforce their narratives with imagery that coalesces into a remarkable sense of place."

The Milwaukee Journal Sentinel put the song "Home (Leave the Lights On)" as the top song from Milwaukee in 2014.

== Inspiration ==
Porterfield has said, “For me, songwriting all starts with the words. I’m very lyrically driven.” He often uses metaphors and historical references to paint a picture or inspire a certain feeling with his lyrics. He has said he was influenced by other artists known primarily for their descriptive and poetic lyrics, including Paul Simon and Joni Mitchell. For Field Report's second album, he created the word "Marigolden" to serve as the name of the seventh track and album. The word is a combination of marigold, indicating the effort needed to maintain the status quo, and golden, suggesting a desired status.

Field Report's sound centers around the narrative songs that bring to mind the writing on albums like Bob Dylan's Blood on the Tracks and Bruce Springsteen's Nebraska.

== Band members ==
- Christopher Porterfield: Lead vocals, guitar
- Devin Drobka: Drums
- Barry Clark: Bass
- Caley Conway: Guitar, Backing Vocals

== Past members ==
- Shane Leonard: Drums, Fiddle, Banjo, Backing Vocals
- Nick Berg: Keyboards, backing vocals
- Damian Strigens: Drums
- Jeff Mitchell: Baritone guitar, backing vocals
- Ben Lester: Pedal steel guitar
- Travis Whitty: Bass guitar, backing vocals
- Thomas Wincek: Guitar, Keyboards, Backing Vocals

== Discography ==
=== Field Report (2012) ===
1. "Fergus Falls" - 5:03
2. "The Year Of The Get You Alone" - 5:12
3. "I Am Not Waiting Anymore" - 3:28
4. "Taking Alcatraz" - 5:23
5. "Incommunicado" - 3:21
6. "Circle Drive" - 3:35
7. "Chico the American" - 5:50
8. "Evergreen" - 3:14
9. "Captain Video" - 3:34
10. "Route 18" - 5:46

=== Marigolden (2014) ===
1. "Decision Day" - 4:32
2. "Home (Leave the Lights On) - 3:41
3. "Pale Rider" - 5:01
4. "Cups and Cups" - 4:21
5. "Ambrosia" - 4:46
6. "Wings" - 4:32
7. "Marigolden" - 4:19
8. "Michelle" - 5:14
9. "Summons" - 4:51
10. "Enchantment" - 5:01

=== Summertime Songs (2018) ===
1. "Blind Spot" - 3:39
2. "If I Knew" - 4:46
3. "Never Look Back" - 3:41
4. "60 Second Distance Run" - 2:59
5. "Every Time" - 5:25
6. "Healing Machine" - 4:15
7. "Summertime" - 4:52
8. "Tightrope" - 3:26
9. "Occupied Mind" - 3:38
10. "Everything I Need" - 4:00

=== Brake Light Red Tide (2020) ===
1. "Peoria" - 3:34
2. "Breathe" - 4:29
3. "A River's Love" - 5:13
4. "Push Us Into Love" - 4:20
5. "Puget Sound" - 4:45
6. "Whulge" - 3:50
7. "Begin To Begin" - 5:48

=== Trust In Movements Made EP (2024, Bandcamp Exclusive) ===
1. "Joy" - 3:55
2. "Caught Me Off Guard" - 3:26
3. "Unhealthy Love" - 3:55
4. "Trust In Movements Made" - 4:18
5. "Learning and Unlearning" - 6:30
