= Unmap =

Studio album by Volcano Choir
- Released: September 22, 2009
- Genre: Ambient, experimental
- Length: 35:13
- Label: Jagjaguwar

Volcano Choir chronology
Unmap (2009)	Repave (2013)

Singles from Unmap
- 1. "Island, IS" Released: August 11, 2009

Professional ratings
Aggregate scores
Source	Rating
Metacritic	71/100
Review scores
Source	Rating
Absolutepunk.net	87%
AllMusic	3/5 stars
Pitchfork	8.3/10
PopMatters	8/10
Spin	6/10 stars

Unmap is the debut studio album by the indie rock band Volcano Choir. It was recorded in the fall of 2008 in Fall Creek, Wisconsin and released on September 22, 2009 on Jagjaguwar. The album reached #92 on the Billboard 200.

The album was reissued on April 7, 2015 exclusively through Newbury Comics. A limit of 500 vinyl copies were to be pressed but a communication error with the manufacturer led to an extra 250 copies of the reissue, amounting to a limited supply of 750 vinyl copies. Stickers attached to the album citing the 500-copy release were covered by new stickers citing the run of 750.

== Track listing ==
No.	Title	Length
1.	"Husks and Shells"	3:43
2.	"Seeplymouth"	6:43
3.	"Island, IS"	4:08
4.	"Dote"	2:50
5.	"And Gather"	2:18
6.	"Mbira in the Morass"	3:51
7.	"Cool Knowledge"	1:07
8.	"Still"	6:55
9.	"Youlogy"	3:37
Total length:		35:13

Notes

- "Still" contains elements of Bon Iver's song "Woods".
