= Justin Vernon =

American singer-songwriter (born 1981)

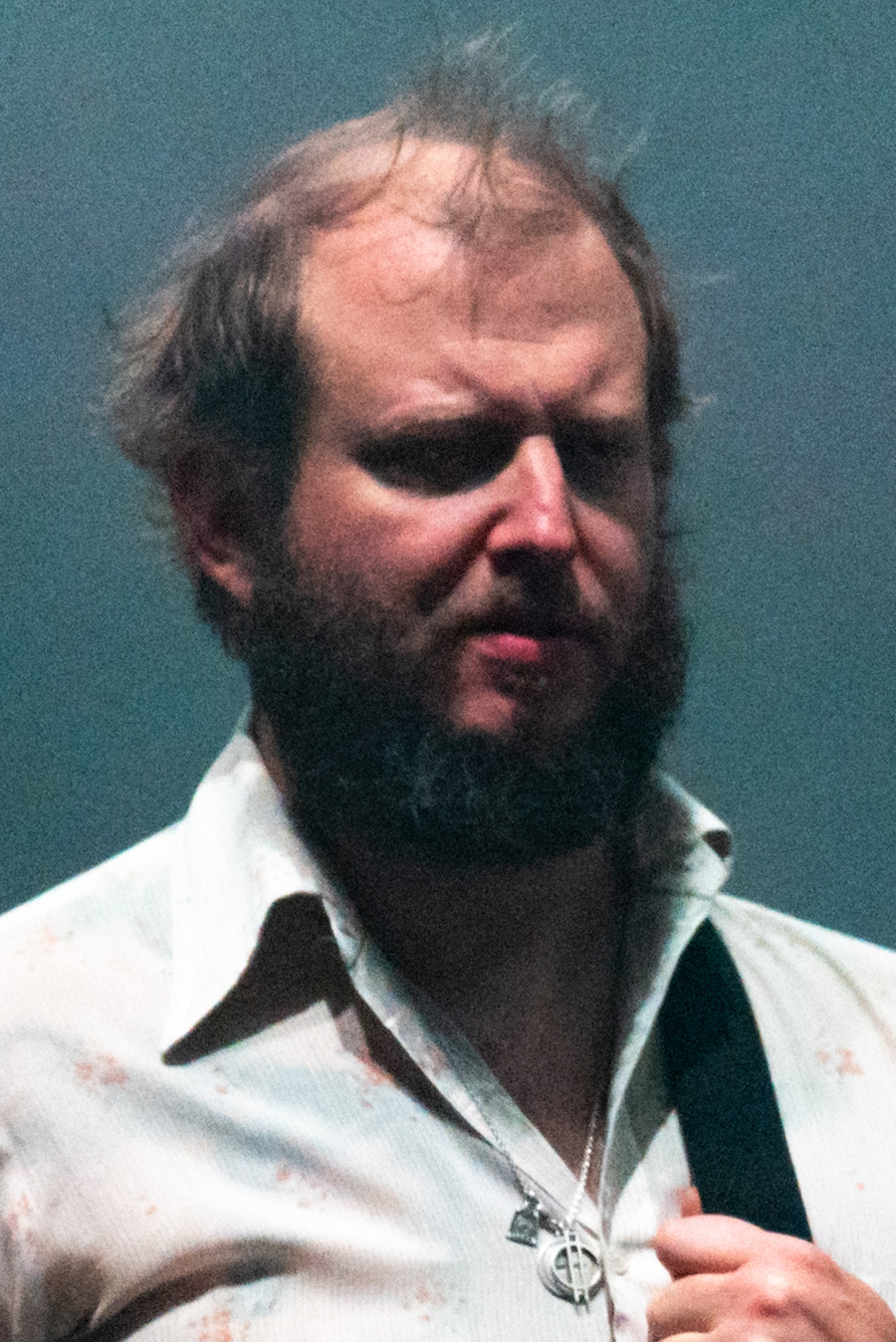
- Vernon performing with Big Red Machine in 2019

Background information
- Also known as: Bon Iver
- Born: Justin DeYarmond Edison Vernon; April 30, 1981 (age 45); Eau Claire, Wisconsin, U.S.
- Genres: Indie folk; art pop; folktronica; progressive pop; folk; baroque pop; pop soul; indie rock; electronic
- Occupations: Singer-songwriter; musician
- Instruments: Vocals; guitar; keyboards; banjo; bass; drums; percussion; piano
- Years active: 1998–present
- Member of: Bon Iver; Volcano Choir; Big Red Machine; The Shouting Matches; Gayngs
- Formerly of: DeYarmond Edison

Justin DeYarmond Edison Vernon (born April 30, 1981) is an American singer, songwriter, producer and multi-instrumentalist. He is best-known as the primary songwriter and frontman of indie folk band Bon Iver. He is also a member of the bands Volcano Choir, Big Red Machine, the Shouting Matches, and Gayngs, and was previously a member of the now-defunct band DeYarmond Edison. Known for his distinct falsetto voice, Vernon has received widespread acclaim for his work, predominantly with Bon Iver.

== Early life ==
Vernon attended Memorial High School in Eau Claire, Wisconsin, where he still resides today. He formed his first band, Mount Vernon, in 1997 after meeting its members at a Wisconsin high school jazz camp. They released their first local musical project in 1998. He graduated from Memorial High in 1999 and attended college at the University of Wisconsin–Eau Claire, spending a semester in Ireland. Vernon majored in Religious Studies and minored in Women's Studies. In an interview on The Colbert Report, he said that was because, at the time, he hadn't been ready to study music.

== Career ==
=== Pre-Bon Iver ===
In 2001, Vernon released his first solo album under the name "J.D Vernon", titled Home Is. He went on to release two other solo albums, namely Self Record in 2005, which was followed shortly thereafter by Hazeltons in 2006. Vernon founded the band DeYarmond Edison in 2001 while still in college.

The band, which began performing in 2002, consisted of Vernon, Phil Cook, Christopher Porterfield, and Joe Westerlund. After playing in the Eau Claire music scene, the four bandmates decided to leave their longtime home and move to Raleigh, North Carolina, to try their musical hand in a new place. The band released two records themselves, the first self-titled in 2004 and the second titled Silent Signs in 2005, and an EP of unreleased material is available on their Myspace page. In 2006, after nearly a year in Raleigh, Vernon returned to Wisconsin after a breakup with the band and a girlfriend. The remaining members of DeYarmond Edison went on to form the folk bands Megafaun and Field Report.

=== Bon Iver ===
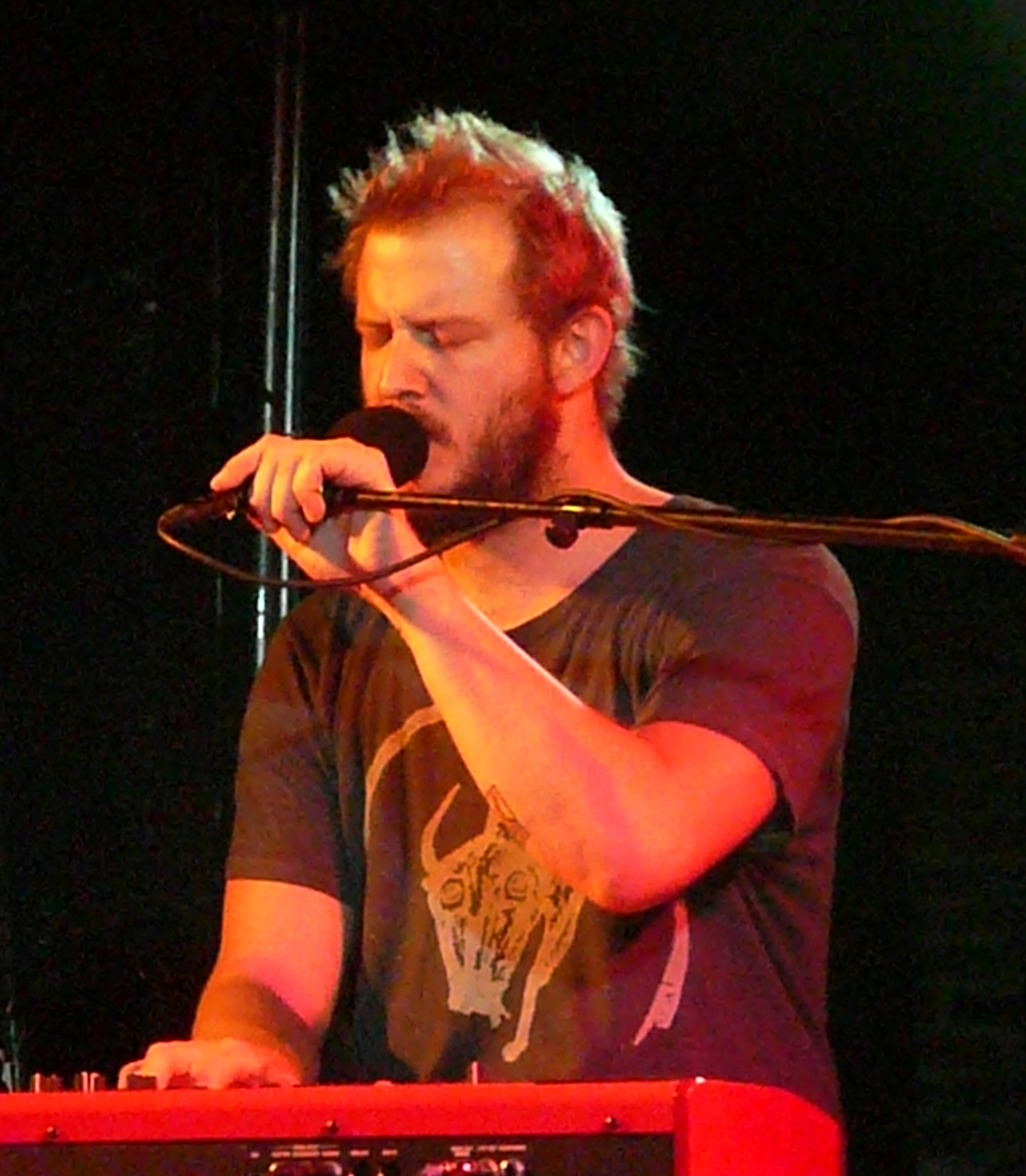
Vernon performing with Bon Iver in Black Cat, Washington, D.C., in 2008

Vernon came to international prominence with For Emma, Forever Ago, his first album as Bon Iver, which he recorded isolated in a northern Wisconsin cabin during the winter months of 2006 and 2007, while he was going through health and personal difficulties. The album was self-released by Vernon in July 2007 and after it received several positive reviews, including from Pitchfork, the album was rereleased in February 2008 and released internationally in May of that year.

Bon Iver won Best New Artist and Best Alternative Album at the 2012 Grammy Awards, for their 2011 self-titled album. On September 25, 2012, Vernon walked away from Bon Iver temporarily, virtually putting an end to the band for the time being. When asked for reasoning, he replied, "[I'm] winding it down. I look at it like a faucet. I have to turn it off and walk away from it because so much of how that music comes together is subconscious or discovering. There's so much attention on the band, it can be distracting at times. I really feel the need to walk away from it while I still care about it. And then if I come back to it – if at all – I'll feel better about it and be renewed or something to do that."

The band's third studio album, 22, A Million, was released on September 30, 2016, to critical acclaim. The album marked a major shift in Bon Iver's musical style, with prominent uses of electronic instrumentation and voice modulation, a contrast to Vernon's previous acoustic style.

On August 9, 2019, Vernon released i,i, to critical acclaim. The band's fourth studio LP is vocal-heavy and features dozens of collaborators, emulating the message Vernon intended to send when working with Aaron Dessner in producing Big Red Machine.

In October 2024, Vernon began releasing singles to preview a new LP called SABLE, fABLE, which was released on April 11, 2025.

=== Collaborations and side projects ===
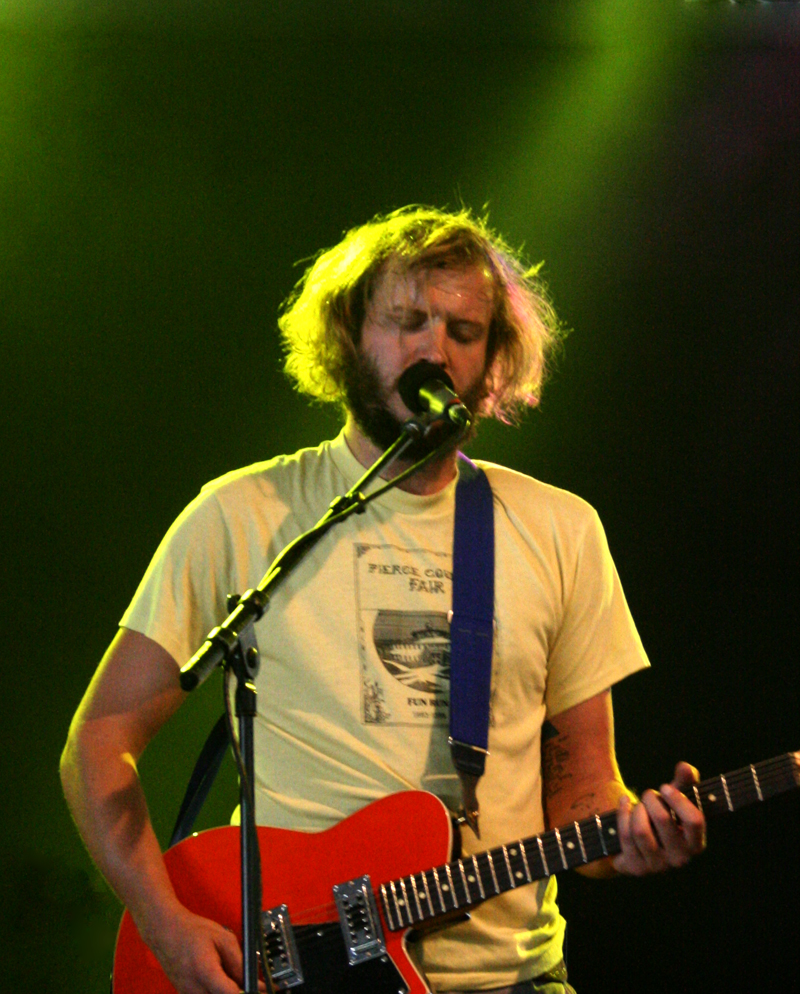
Vernon performing with Bon Iver in Gothenburg, Sweden, in 2009

Vernon is a part of other musical groups, including Volcano Choir, which consists of Vernon and the members of the band Collections of Colonies of Bees. In 2009, Unmap was released. His collaborative group Gayngs, consisting of multiple established artists, including members from Megafaun, the Rosebuds, Doomtree and Solid Gold, among others, released Relayted in 2010.

Vernon contributed vocals as Orpheus to seven songs on Anaïs Mitchell's 2010 album Hadestown, based on the Greek legend Orpheus and Eurydice. He is one third of the Shouting Matches, a blues-garage rock trio, along with Laarks and Peter Wolf Crier drummer Brian Moen, and former DeYarmond Edison bandmate Phil Cook. They have recorded and released a 5-track EP, Mouthoil, and their debut album, Grownass Man, in 2013.

During the creation of Kanye West's 2010 album My Beautiful Dark Twisted Fantasy, Vernon was invited to collaborate on various songs, providing vocals on "Dark Fantasy", "Monster", "Hell Of A Life" and "Lost in the World", as well as the song "That's My Bitch" from West and Jay-Z's collaborative album Watch the Throne in 2011. He was also involved in West's 2013 album Yeezus, contributing to "I Am A God", "Hold My Liquor", and "I'm In It".

He has, on several occasions, served as backing vocalist for West at his live performances, notably at the Coachella Valley Music and Arts Festival in 2011 and Glastonbury Festival in 2015, where Kanye West introduced Vernon as "one of the baddest white boys on the planet". In 2009, Vernon collaborated with Aaron Dessner on the song "Big Red Machine" for the AIDS benefit album Dark Was the Night produced by the Red Hot Organization.

He has produced albums for other artists, including Land of Talk's 2008 album Some Are Lakes and Kathleen Edwards' 2012 album, Voyageur.

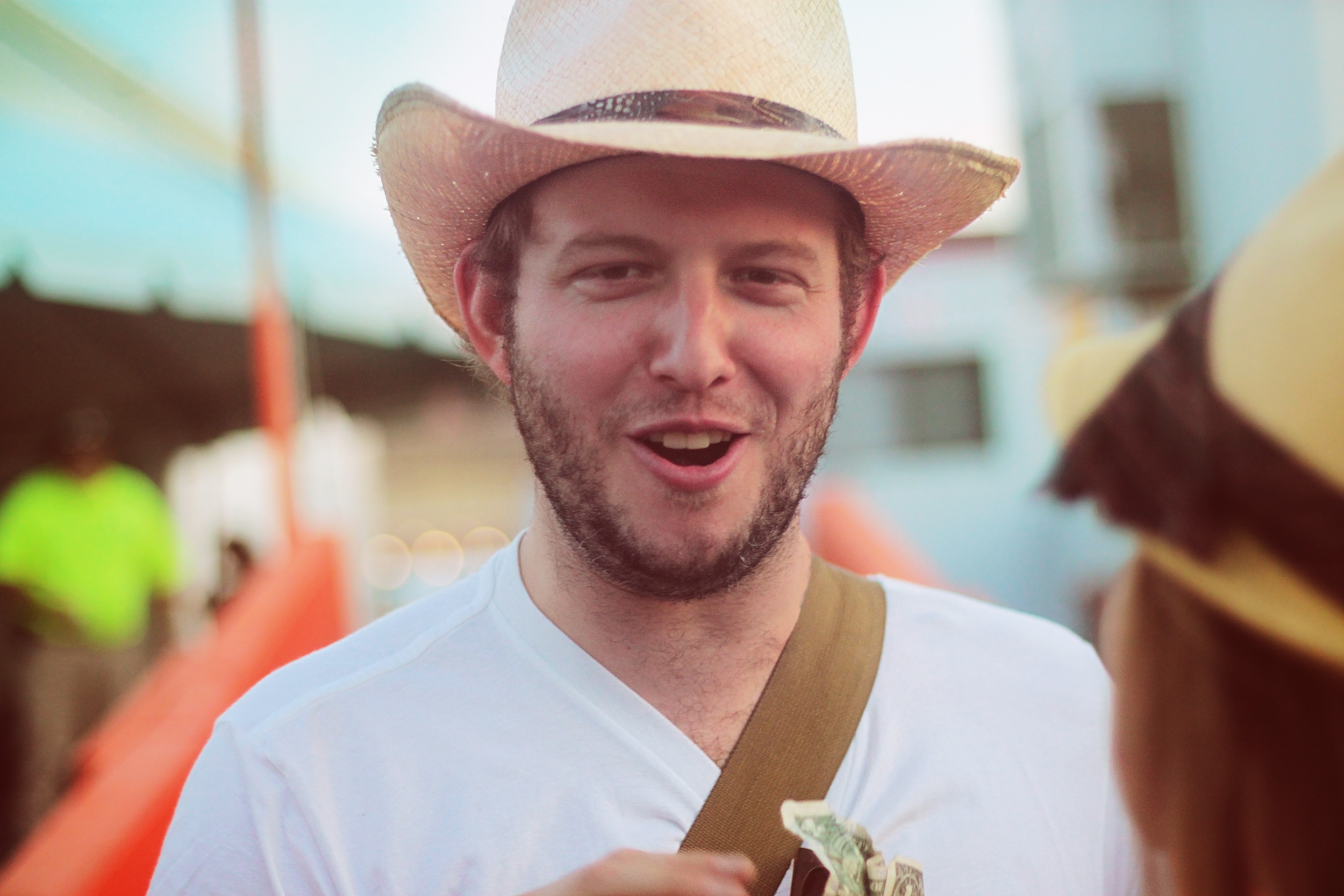
Vernon at Jazz Fest in 2012

In 2012, Vernon began Chigliak, an imprint of Jagjaguwar, dedicated to albums that have had limited or non-commercial releases. In 2014, Jason Feathers, a collaboration with Vernon, Ryan Olson (member of Gayngs, Poliça and Marijuana Deathsquads), indie rapper Astronautalis and Bon Iver member Sean Carey (known by his stage name S. Carey), released De Oro.

In 2017, Vernon collaborated with Mouse on Mars on their album Dimensional People who used his studio April Base. His voice can be heard on the song Dimensional People III.

On June 23, 2018, Vernon joined Dead & Company on stage at Alpine Valley Music Theatre in East Troy, Wisconsin. He performed three songs with the band: "Black Muddy River", "Friend of the Devil", and "Birdsong". Given Vernon's Wisconsin roots, it was a special appearance that highlighted the timelessness and versatility of the Dead's music.

In late August 2018, Vernon released the eponymous debut album of duet Big Red Machine alongside the National's Aaron Dessner. The 10 song self-titled album Big Red Machine was co-produced by Dessner, Vernon and Brad Cook, and features approximately 40 collaborators, including Bryce Dessner, Bryan Devendorf, and Richard Parry. The majority of the album was recorded in Dessner's garage studio in Hudson Valley, New York.

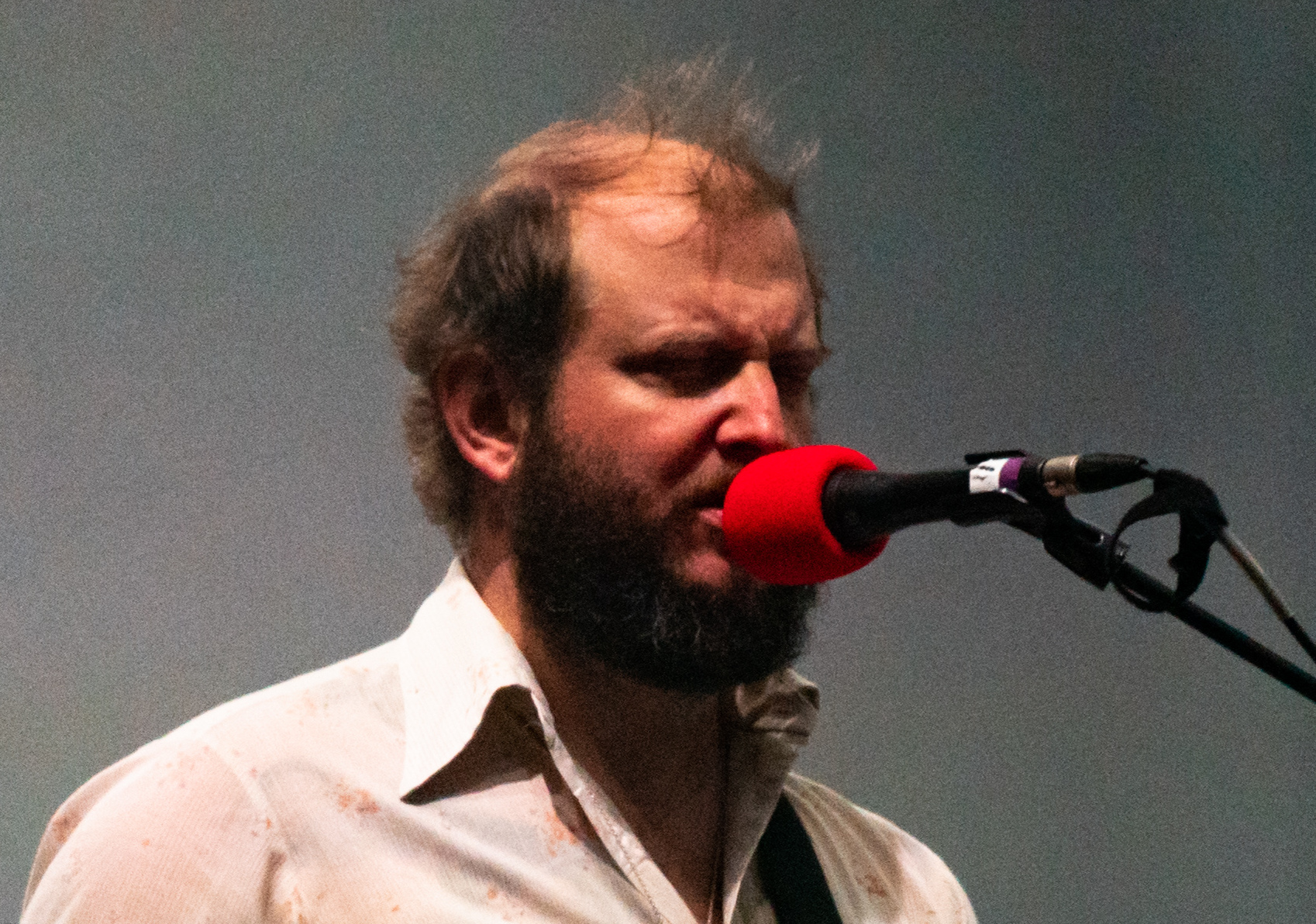
Vernon with Bon Iver in Barcelona, Spain at Primavera Sound in 2019

In March 2020 the Ryan Olson-produced album Sorry You Couldn't Make It by Swamp Dogg was released, with Vernon playing guitar on all tracks. He had previously appeared as a guest on Swamp Dogg's 2018 album Love, Loss & Autotune. Later in 2020, Vernon collaborated with Taylor Swift to write and feature on the song "Exile", with an instrumental credit on "Peace", for her eighth studio album Folklore. Swift released her ninth studio album Evermore, a surprise follow-up album to Folklore. Vernon co-wrote the title track and played other instruments as well as performed background vocals on several tracks.

=== Eaux Claires ===
Vernon founded and curated the Eaux Claires music and arts festival along with Aaron Dessner of the National.

In August 2016, Vernon and Dessner curated the second annual Eaux Claires festival. On the opening night of the festival, Bon Iver debuted their third album, 22, A Million, in front of a live audience. 22, A Million was released on September 30, 2016, to widespread critical acclaim.

== Discography ==
=== Solo albums ===
- Home Is (as JD Vernon, 2001)
- Self Record (2005)
- Hazeltons (2006)

=== Mount Vernon ===
- We Can Look Up (1998)
- All of Us Free (2000)

=== DeYarmond Edison ===
- DeYarmond Edison (2004)
- Silent Signs (2005)
- The Bickett Residency (2005)
- Unreleased EP (2006)
- Epoch (2023)

=== Bon Iver ===
- For Emma, Forever Ago (2007)
- Blood Bank (2009)
- Bon Iver, Bon Iver (2011)
- 22, A Million (2016)
- i,i (2019)
- SABLE, (2024)
- SABLE, fABLE (2025)

=== Shouting Matches ===
- Mouthoil (2008, limited release in Milwaukee and Minneapolis, re-released in 2013)
- Grownass Man (2013)

=== Volcano Choir ===
- Unmap (2009)
- Repave (2013)

=== Gayngs ===
- Relayted (2010)

=== Big Red Machine ===
- Big Red Machine (2018)
- How Long Do You Think It's Gonna Last? (2021)

=== Collaborative albums ===
- A Decade with Duke (with Eau Claire Memorial Jazz I Ensemble, 2009)
- De Oro (with Astronautalis, S. Carey and Ryan Olson, as Jason Feathers, 2014)

=== Other collaborations ===
- 2010: Hadestown (with Anaïs Mitchell)
- 2010: "Dark Fantasy", "Monster", "Hell of a Life" and "Lost in the World" (off Kanye West's My Beautiful Dark Twisted Fantasy)
- 2011: "That's My Bitch" (off Jay-Z and Kanye West's Watch the Throne)
- 2011: "Fall Creek Boys Choir" (with James Blake)
- 2011: "An Iris" (All Tiny Creatures)
- 2012: "How We Land" (off P.O.S's We Don't Even Live Here")
- 2013: New History Warfare Vol. 3: To See More Light (with Colin Stetson)
- 2013: "I Am a God", "Hold My Liquor" and "I'm In It" (off Kanye West's Yeezus)
- 2013: "Naked" (Off Travis $cott's Owl Pharaoh)
- 2013: "Tiff" (off Poliça's Shulamith)
- 2013: "Every Grain of Sand" (off the Blind Boys of Alabama's I'll Find a Way)
- 2014: "Oyster and Pearl", "The Gig That Matters", "Broken Record", and "Let the Spirit" (off Amy Ray's Goodnight Tender)
- 2014: "Twice" (featuring Brad Cook) (off Dames's Time Spent)
- 2016: "I Need a Forest Fire" and "Meet You in the Maze" (off James Blake's The Colour in Anything)
- 2016: "Over the Rise" (off Bruce Hornsby & the Noisemakers's Rehab Reunion)
- 2016: "Friends" (with Francis and the Lights and uncredited contribution from Kanye West)
- 2017: "Zizzing" (off Ani DiFranco's Binary)
- 2017: "Faded" (off P.O.S's Chill, Dummy)
- 2017: "Crabs in a Bucket" (off Vince Staples's Big Fish Theory)
- 2017: "Daphne" (off Lia Ices's Grown Unknown)
- 2018: "Dimensional People Part III" (off Mouse on Mars's Dimensional People)
- 2018: "Wouldn't Leave" (off Kanye West's Ye (album))
- 2018: "Feel the Love" and "Kids See Ghosts" (off Kids See Ghosts' KIDS SEE GHOSTS) (Kanye West & Kid Cudi)
- 2018: "Simple Things" (off Nas's Nasir)
- 2018: "Foxfire" (off Jeremy Lindenfeld's The Foxfire EP)
- 2018: "Fall" (off Eminem's Kamikaze, songwriter and uncredited vocals)
- 2018: Love, Loss, and Auto-Tune (Swamp Dogg)
- 2019: "Cast-Off" and "Meds" (featuring Blake Mills & Rob Moose) (off Bruce Hornsby's Absolute Zero)
- 2019: "Take Me to the Light" (Francis and the Lights featuring Kanye West, Chance the Rapper & Caroline Shaw)
- 2020: "Carolina" (off Sarah Siskind's Modern Appalachia)
- 2020: "Sleeping Without You Is a Dragg" (Swamp Dogg featuring Jenny Lewis)
- 2020: "Simulation" (featuring Swamp Dogg) (off Naeem's Startisha)
- 2020: "Exile" and "Peace" (with Bon Iver) (off Taylor Swift's Folklore)
- 2020: "Dionne" (off the Japanese House's Chewing Cotton Wool)
- 2020: "Jeanie" (with Bon Iver) (off Jim-E Stack's Ephemera)
- 2020: "Land" (off CARM's CARM)
- 2020: "Evermore", "Ivy", "Cowboy Like Me", "Marjorie" and "Closure" (with Bon Iver) (off Taylor Swift's Evermore)
- 2020: "Bright Morning Stars" (off Bonny Light Horseman's Bonny Light Horseman)
- 2021: "Catalog of Unabashed Gratitude" (with Ross Gay)
- 2021: "Ever New" (with Flock of Dimes & Beverly Glenn-Copeland)
- 2022: "So Unimportant" (with Ethan Gruska)
- 2022: "Weird Goodbyes" (with The National)
- 2023: "Kindness Will Follow Your Tears" (with Lonnie Holley)
- 2023: "Heart of Gold" (with Bon Iver & Ilsey)
- 2023: "Marvel Room" (with Rob Moose & Bon Iver)
- 2023: "My Eyes" (with Travis Scott & Sampha)
- 2023: "Delresto (Echoes)" (with Travis Scott & Beyoncé)
- 2023: "Boys of Faith" (with Zach Bryan)
- 2024: "I think about it all the time featuring bon iver" (with Charli xcx & Bon Iver)
- 2025: "Tie you down" (with Haim)
- 2026: "Flood / Glow" (with Dua Saleh)
