= Bon Iver discography =

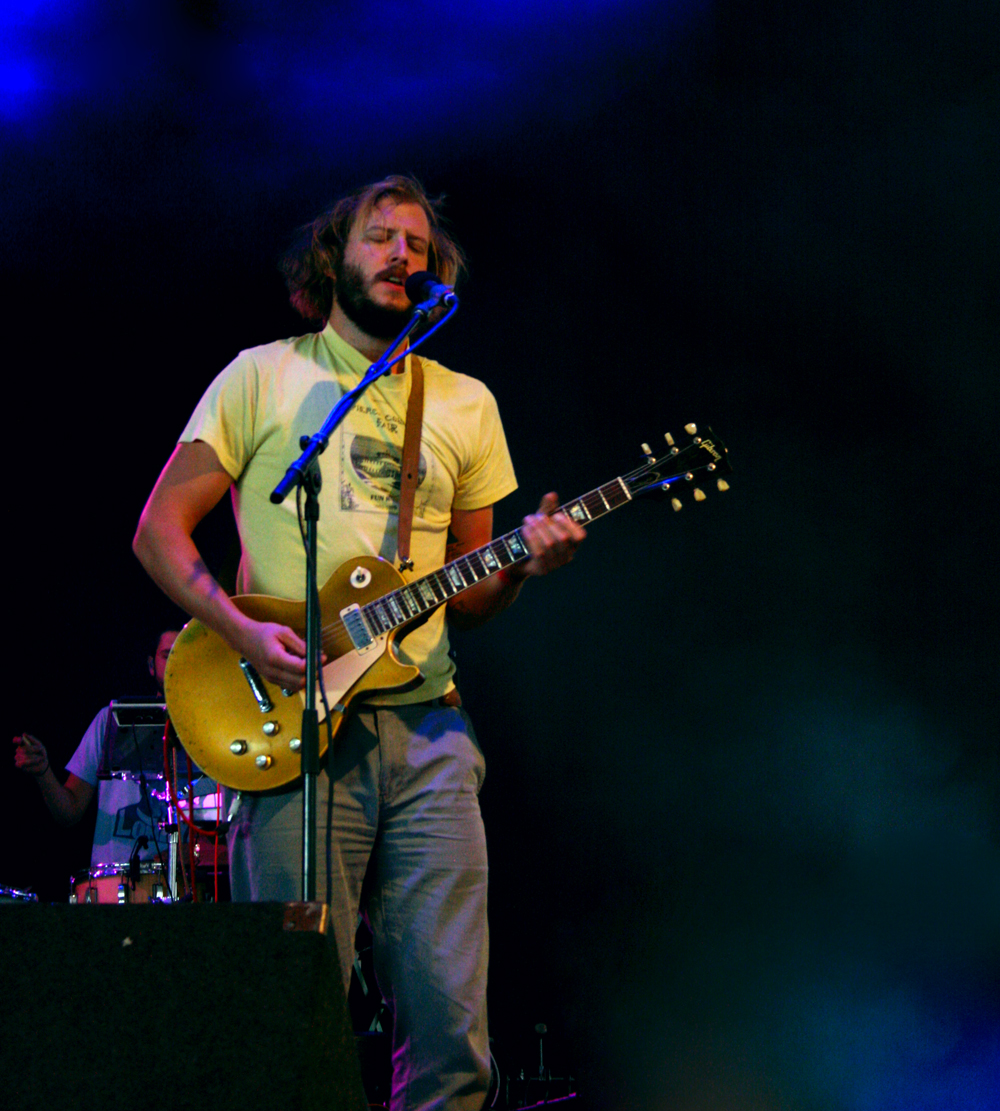
- Justin Vernon performing as Bon Iver in Gothenburg, Sweden
- Studio albums: 5
- Extended plays: 3
- Singles: 8
- Music videos: 4

The discography of American indie folk band Bon Iver consists of five studio albums, three extended plays (EP), eight singles and four music videos. The material has been released by the Jagjaguwar label in North America and by the 4AD label in Europe.

Founded by singer-songwriter Justin Vernon, Bon Iver released its debut album, For Emma, Forever Ago in 2008. An EP, Blood Bank, followed in 2009. The title track peaked at number 37 on the UK Singles Chart and also reached the charts in Ireland and France. The group's second full-length studio album, Bon Iver, was released in 2011. It debuted at number two on the US Billboard 200 chart, number four on the UK Albums Chart and peaked inside the top 10 in Canada, Denmark, Ireland and the Netherlands.

== Studio albums ==
Title	Album details	Peak chart positions										Certifications
Title	Album details	US	AUS	BEL (FL)	CAN	DEN	FRA	IRE	NL	NZ	UK	Certifications
For Emma, Forever Ago	Released: July 8, 2007; Label: Jagjaguwar; Formats: LP, CD, digital download	64	32	20	—	33	—	16	61	—	42	RIAA: Platinum; ARIA: Platinum; BPI: Platinum; IFPI DEN: 2× Platinum; RMNZ: Platinum
Bon Iver, Bon Iver	Released: June 17, 2011; Label: Jagjaguwar; Formats: LP, CD, digital download	2	2	4	6	1	54	3	15	5	4	RIAA: Platinum; ARIA: Platinum; BPI: Gold; IFPI DEN: Gold; MC: Gold; RMNZ: Platinum
22, A Million	Released: September 30, 2016; Label: Jagjaguwar; Formats: LP, CD, digital download	2	2	2	1	3	31	2	8	1	2	BPI: Gold; IFPI DEN: Gold
I, I	Released: August 9, 2019; Label: Jagjaguwar; Formats: LP, CD, digital download, streaming	26	8	5	14	12	97	11	21	32	11	
Sable, Fable	Released: April 11, 2025; Label: Jagjaguwar; Formats: LP, CD, digital download, streaming	11	4	3	23	2	78	23	8	5	4	
"—" denotes releases that did not chart

== Extended plays ==
Title	Album details	Peak chart positions								Certifications
Title	Album details	US	US Alt	US Indie	US Rock	AUS	DEN	UK	UK Indie	Certifications
Blood Bank	Release date: January 20, 2009; Label: Jagjaguwar; Formats: LP, CD, digital download	16	4	3	6	27	—	—	—	RIAA: Gold
iTunes Session	Release date: June 19, 2012; Label: Jagjaguwar; Format: Digital download	87	20	18	36	—	18	118	13	
Sable	Release date: October 18, 2024; Label: Jagjaguwar; Format: Digital download	—	—	—	—	—	—	— (Note: Sable did not enter the UK Albums Chart, but peaked at number 21 on the UK Singles Sales Chart Top 100.)	—	
"—" denotes releases that did not chart

== Singles ==
=== As lead artist ===
Title	Year	Peak chart positions										Certifications	Album
Title	Year	US Bub.	US Rock	AUS	BEL (FL)	DEN	FRA	IRE	JPN	NZ	UK	Certifications	Album
"Skinny Love"	2008	—	—	— (Note: "Skinny Love" did not enter the Australian ARIA Singles Chart but peaked at number 20 on the ARIA Hitseekers Chart.)	— (Note: "Skinny Love" did not enter the Flemish Ultratop chart, but peaked at number 9 on the Ultratop Back Catalogue Singles chart.)	32	—	—	—	—	— (Note: "Skinny Love" did not enter the UK Singles Chart, but peaked at number 70 on the UK Streaming Chart.)	RIAA: 2× Platinum; BPI: Platinum; FIMI: Gold; IFPI DEN: Platinum; RMNZ: 2× Platinum	For Emma, Forever Ago
"For Emma"	2008	—	—	—	—	—	—	—	—	—	— (Note: "For Emma" did not enter the UK Singles Chart, but peaked at number 48 on the UK Physical Singles Chart Top 100.)	RIAA: Gold; RMNZ: Gold	For Emma, Forever Ago
"re: Stacks"	2008	—	—	—	—	—	—	—	—	—	—	RIAA: Gold; BPI: Silver; IFPI DEN: Gold; RMNZ: Platinum	For Emma, Forever Ago
"Blood Bank"	2009	— (Note: "Blood Bank" did not enter the Billboard Hot 100, but peaked at number 3 on the Hot Singles Sales chart.)	—	— (Note: "Blood Bank" did not enter the Australian ARIA Singles Chart but peaked at number eight on the ARIA Hitseekers Chart.)	—	—	54	24	—	—	37	BPI: Silver; RMNZ: Gold	Blood Bank EP
"Calgary"	2011	— (Note: "Calgary" did not enter the Billboard Hot 100, but peaked at number 4 on the Hot Singles Sales chart.)	— (Note: "Calgary" did not enter the Rock Songs chart, but peaked at number 42 on the Rock Digital Songs chart.)	— (Note: "Calgary" did not enter the Australian ARIA Singles Chart but peaked at number six on the ARIA Hitseekers Chart.)	— (Note: "Calgary" did not enter the Flanders Ultratop 50, but peaked at 31 on the Flanders Ultratip chart.)	—	—	—	—	—	— (Note: "Calgary" did not enter the UK Singles Chart, but peaked at number 15 on the UK Physical Singles Chart Top 100.)		Bon Iver, Bon Iver
"Holocene"	2011	18	— (Note: "Holocene" did not enter the Rock Songs chart, but peaked at number 19 on the Rock Digital Songs chart.)	—	— (Note: "Holocene" did not enter the Flanders Ultratop 50, but peaked at nine on the Flanders Ultratip chart.)	—	—	—	39	—	— (Note: "Holocene" did not enter the UK Singles Chart, but peaked at number 17 on the UK Physical Singles Chart Top 100.)	RIAA: Platinum; BPI: Gold; FIMI: Gold; IFPI DEN: Gold; RMNZ: Platinum	Bon Iver, Bon Iver
"Towers"	2012	— (Note: "Towers" did not enter the Billboard Hot 100, but peaked at number 12 on the Hot Singles Sales chart.)	—	— (Note: "Towers" did not enter the Australian ARIA Singles Chart but peaked at number 19 on the ARIA Hitseekers Chart.)	—	—	—	—	—	—	— (Note: "Towers" did not enter the UK Singles Chart, but peaked at number 12 on the UK Physical Singles Chart.)		Bon Iver, Bon Iver
"Beth/Rest"	2012	—	—	—	—	—	—	—	—	—	— (Note: "Beth/Rest" did not enter the UK Singles Chart, but peaked at number 16 on the UK Physical Singles Chart.)		Bon Iver, Bon Iver
"Heavenly Father"	2014	—	— (Note: "Heavenly Father" did not enter the Rock Songs chart, but peaked at number 43 on the Rock Digital Songs chart.)	85	—	—	—	—	—	—	—		Wish I Was Here (Music From The Motion Picture)
"22 (OVER S∞∞N)" (Note: "22 (OVER S∞∞N)" was released as a dual single with "10 d E A T h b R E a s T ⚄ ⚄", entitled "22/10".)	2016	— (Note: "22 (OVER S∞∞N)" did not enter the Billboard Hot 100, but peaked at number 1 on the Hot Singles Sales chart.)	18	— (Note: "22 (OVER S∞∞N)" did not enter the Australian ARIA Singles Chart but peaked at number 17 on the ARIA Hitseekers Chart.)	— (Note: "22 (OVER S∞∞N)" did not enter the Flanders Ultratop 50, but peaked at 22 on the Flanders Ultratip chart.)	—	—	—	—	— (Note: "22 (OVER S∞∞N)" did not enter the NZ Top 40 Singles Chart, but peaked at number eight on the NZ Heatseeker Singles Chart.)	— (Note: "22 (OVER S∞∞N)" did not enter the UK Singles Chart, but peaked at number 2 on the UK Physical Singles Chart Top 100.)		22, A Million
"10 d E A T h b R E a s T ⚄ ⚄" (Note: "10 d E A T h b R E a s T ⚄ ⚄" was released as a dual single with "22 (OVER S∞∞N)", entitled "22/10".)	2016	—	25	—	—	—	—	—	—	—	—		22, A Million
"33 "GOD""	2016	—	11	—	—	—	—	—	—	— (Note: "33 “GOD"" did not enter the NZ Top 40 Singles Chart, but peaked at number five on the NZ Heatseeker Singles Chart.)	— (Note: "33 “GOD"" did not enter the UK Singles Chart, but peaked at number 98 on the UK Streaming Chart.)		22, A Million
"Hey, Ma"	2019	—	17	— (Note: "Hey, Ma" did not enter the Australian ARIA Singles Chart but peaked at number five on the ARIA Hitseekers Chart.)	— (Note: "Hey, Ma" did not enter the Flanders Ultratop 50, but peaked at 30 on the Flanders Ultratip chart.)	—	—	—	—	— (Note: "Hey, Ma" did not enter the NZ Top 40 Singles Chart, but peaked at number 13 on the NZ Hot Singles Chart.)	—	RMNZ: Gold	I, I
"U (Man Like)"	2019	—	37	—	— (Note: "U (Man Like)" did not enter the Flanders Ultratop 50, but peaked at 38 on the Flanders Ultratip chart.)	—	—	—	—	—	—		I, I
"Faith"	2019	—	28	—	— (Note: "Faith" did not enter the Flanders Ultratop 50, but peaked at 34 on the Flanders Ultratip chart.)	—	—	—	—	— (Note: "Faith" did not enter the NZ Top 40 Singles Chart, but peaked at number 28 on the NZ Hot Singles Chart.)	—		I, I
"Jelmore"	2019	—	—	—	—	—	—	—	—	—	—		I, I
"PDLIF"	2020	—	36	—	— (Note: "PDLIF" did not enter the Flanders Ultratop 50, but charted as an extra tip on the Flanders Ultratip chart.)	—	—	—	—	— (Note: "PDLIF" did not enter the NZ Top 40 Singles Chart, but peaked at number 28 on the NZ Hot Singles Chart.)	—		Non-album singles
"AUATC"	2020	—	—	—	— (Note: "AUATC" did not enter the Flanders Ultratop 50, but charted as an extra tip on the Flanders Ultratip chart.)	—	—	—	—	— (Note: "AUATC" did not enter the NZ Top 40 Singles Chart, but peaked at number 35 on the NZ Hot Singles Chart.)	—		Non-album singles
"So Unimportant" (with Ethan Gruska)	2022	—	—	—	—	—	—	—	—	—	—		Non-album singles
"Speyside"	2024	—	27	—	48	—	—	91	—	— (Note: "Speyside" did not enter the NZ Top 40 Singles Chart, but peaked at number four on the NZ Hot Singles Chart.)	70		Sable, Fable
"Everything Is Peaceful Love"	2025	—	43	—	—	—	—	—	—	— (Note: "Everything Is Peaceful Love" did not enter the NZ Top 40 Singles Chart, but peaked at number 25 on the NZ Hot Singles Chart.)	—		Sable, Fable
"If Only I Could Wait" / "Walk Home"	2025	—	44	—	—	—	—	—	—	— (Note: "If Only I Could Wait" did not enter the NZ Top 40 Singles Chart, but peaked at number 25 on the NZ Hot Singles Chart.)	—		Sable, Fable
"If Only I Could Wait" / "Walk Home"	2025	—	—	—	—	—	—	—	—	—	—		Sable, Fable
"—" denotes releases that did not chart

=== As featured artist ===
Title	Year	Peak chart positions										Certifications	Album
Title	Year	US	AUS	BEL (FL)	CAN	DEN	IRE	NL	NZ	UK	WW	Certifications	Album
"Monster" (Kanye West featuring Jay-Z, Rick Ross, Bon Iver and Nicki Minaj)	2010	18	91	—	43	—	—	—	—	111	—	RIAA: 2× Platinum; BPI: Gold; RMNZ: Platinum	My Beautiful Dark Twisted Fantasy
"Fall Creek Boys Choir" (with James Blake)	2011	—	—	—	—	—	—	—	—	—	—		Enough Thunder
"Tiff" (Poliça featuring Justin Vernon)	2013	—	—	—	—	—	—	—	—	—	—		Shulamith
"I Need a Forest Fire" (James Blake featuring Bon Iver)	2016	—	—	— (Note: "I Need a Forest Fire" did not enter the Flanders Ultratop 50, but charted as an extra tip on the Flanders Ultratip chart.)	—	—	—	—	—	195	—	RMNZ: Gold	The Colour in Anything
"Friends" (Francis and the Lights featuring Bon Iver and Kanye West)	2016	—	—	— (Note: "Friends" did not enter the Flanders Ultratop 50, but charted as an extra tip on the Flanders Ultratip chart.)	—	—	—	—	—	— (Note: "Friends" did not enter the UK Singles Chart, but peaked at number 90 on the UK Singles Sales Chart.)	—		Farewell, Starlite!
"Cast-Off" (Bruce Hornsby featuring Justin Vernon)	2019	—	—	— (Note: "Cast-Off" did not enter the Flemish Ultratop chart, but peaked at number 46 on the Ultratip chart.)	—	—	—	—	—	—	—		Absolute Zero
"Take Me to the Light" (Francis and the Lights featuring Bon Iver and Kanye West)	2019	—	—	— (Note: "Take Me to the Light" did not enter the Flanders Ultratop 50, but charted as an extra tip on the Flanders Ultratip chart.)	—	—	—	—	—	—	—		Take Me to the Light
"Exile" (Taylor Swift featuring Bon Iver)	2020	6	3	37	6	32	3	3	5	8	133	RIAA: Gold; ARIA: 4× Platinum; BPI: Platinum; FIMI: Gold; MC: 2× Platinum; RMNZ: 2× Platinum	Folklore
"Jeanie" (Jim-E Stack featuring Bon Iver)	2020	—	—	—	—	—	—	—	—	—	—		Ephemera
"Weird Goodbyes" (The National featuring Bon Iver)	2022	—	—	—	—	—	—	—	—	— (Note: "Weird Goodbyes" did not enter the UK Singles Chart, but peaked at number 81 on the UK Singles Sales Chart Top 100.)	—		Laugh Track
"Moon" (Daniel Caesar featuring Bon Iver)	2025	—	—	—	—	—	—	—	— (Note: "Moon" did not enter the NZ Top 40 Singles Chart, but peaked at number 26 on the NZ Hot Singles Chart.)	—	—		Son of Spergy
"—" denotes releases that did not chart

== Other charted and certified songs ==
Title	Year	Peak chart positions										Certifications	Album
Title	Year	US	US Rock	AUS	BEL (FL) Tip	CAN	KOR	NZ	POR	UK	WW	Certifications	Album
"Flume"	2009	—	—	—	—	—	—	—	—	—	—	RIAA: Gold; BPI: Silver; RMNZ: Gold	For Emma, Forever Ago
"Beach Baby"	2009	—	—	—	—	—	—	—	—	—	—	RIAA: Gold; BPI: Silver; RMNZ: Platinum	Blood Bank
"Rosyln" (with St. Vincent)	2009	—	—	—	—	—	—	—	—	—	—	BPI: Gold; RMNZ: Platinum	The Twilight Saga: New Moon soundtrack
"Dark Fantasy" (Kanye West featuring Teyana Taylor, Nicki Minaj and Bon Iver)	2010	60	—	—	—	67	80	—	—	—	—	RIAA: Gold	My Beautiful Dark Twisted Fantasy
"Lost in the World" (Kanye West featuring Bon Iver)	2010	—	—	—	—	—	104	—	—	—	—	RIAA: Gold	My Beautiful Dark Twisted Fantasy
"Wash."	2011	—	—	—	—	—	—	—	—	—	—	RMNZ: Gold	Bon Iver, Bon Iver
"I Can't Make You Love Me"	2012	—	—	—	—	—	—	—	—	161	—		"Calgary" single
"I Am a God" (Kanye West featuring Justin Vernon)	2013	— (Note: "I Am a God" did not enter the Billboard Hot 100, but peaked at number 9 on the Bubbling Under Hot 100 Singles chart.)	—	— (Note: "I Am a God" did not enter the ARIA Singles Chart, but peaked at number 32 on the Australian Streaming Tracks chart.)	—	—	—	—	—	— (Note: "I Am a God" did not enter the UK Singles Chart, but peaked at number 50 on the UK Streaming Chart.)	—	RIAA: Gold	Yeezus
"Hold My Liquor" (Kanye West featuring Chief Keef and Justin Vernon)	2013	— (Note: "I Am a God" did not enter the Billboard Hot 100, but peaked at number 6 on the Bubbling Under Hot 100 Singles chart.)	—	—	—	—	—	—	—	— (Note: "Hold My Liquor" did not enter the UK Singles Chart, but peaked at number 67 on the UK Streaming Chart.)	—	RIAA: Gold	Yeezus
"I'm In It" (Kanye West featuring Assassin and Justin Vernon)	2013	— (Note: "I'm In It" did not enter the Billboard Hot 100, but peaked at number 17 on the Bubbling Under Hot 100 Singles chart.)	—	—	—	—	—	—	—	— (Note: "I'm In It" did not enter the UK Singles Chart, but peaked at number 78 on the UK Streaming Chart.)	—		Yeezus
"715 – CRΣΣKS"	2016	—	21	—	—	—	—	— (Note: "715 – CRΣΣKS" did not enter the NZ Top 40 Singles Chart, but peaked at number eight on the NZ Heatseeker Singles Chart.)	—	—	—		22, A Million
"29 #Strafford APTS"	2016	—	23	—	—	—	—	—	—	—	—		22, A Million
"666 ʇ"	2016	—	24	—	—	—	—	—	—	—	—		22, A Million
"21 M♢♢N WATER"	2016	—	35	—	—	—	—	—	—	—	—		22, A Million
"8 (circle)"	2016	—	22	—	13	—	—	— (Note: "8 (circle)" did not enter the NZ Top 40 Singles Chart, but peaked at number six on the NZ Heatseeker Singles Chart.)	—	—	—		22, A Million
"____45_____"	2016	—	40	—	—	—	—	—	—	—	—		22, A Million
"00000 Million"	2016	—	36	—	—	—	—	—	—	—	—		22, A Million
"Do You Need Power? (Walk Out Music)"	2018	—	—	—	— (Note: "Do You Need Power? (Walk Out Music)" did not enter the Flanders Ultratop 50, but charted as an extra tip on the Flanders Ultratip chart.)	—	—	—	—	—	—		Creed II: The Album
"iMi"	2019	—	36	—	— (Note: "iMi" did not enter the Flanders Ultratop 50, but charted as an extra tip on the Flanders Ultratip chart.)	—	—	— (Note: "iMi" did not enter the NZ Top 40 Singles Chart, but peaked at number 36 on the NZ Hot Singles Chart.)	—	—	—		I, I
"Naeem"	2019	—	26	—	—	—	—	— (Note: "Naeem" did not enter the NZ Top 40 Singles Chart, but peaked at number 18 on the NZ Hot Singles Chart.)	—	— (Note: "Naeem" did not enter the UK Singles Chart, but peaked at number 100 on the UK Singles Downloads Chart.)	—		I, I
"We"	2019	—	45	—	—	—	—	—	—	—	—		I, I
"Holyfields,"	2019	—	46	—	—	—	—	—	—	—	—		I, I
"Evermore" (Taylor Swift featuring Bon Iver)	2020	57	10	45	—	26	—	—	167	— (Note: "Evermore" did not enter the UK Singles Chart, but peaked at number 85 on the UK Streaming Chart.)	40	ARIA: Platinum; BPI: Silver; RMNZ: Gold	Evermore
"Second Nature"	2021	—	— (Note: "Second Nature" did not enter the Rock Songs chart, but peaked at number 16 on the Rock Digital Songs chart.)	—	—	—	—	—	—	—	—		Don't Look Up (Soundtrack from the Netflix Film)
"Boys of Faith" (Zach Bryan featuring Bon Iver)	2023	26	5	—	—	24	—	— (Note: "Boys of Faith" did not enter the NZ Top 40 Singles Chart, but peaked at number seven on the NZ Hot Singles Chart.)	—	—	84	RIAA: Platinum; MC: Platinum	Boys of Faith
"Things Behind Things Behind Things"	2024	—	31	—	—	—	—	— (Note: "Things Behind Things Behind Things" did not enter the NZ Top 40 Singles Chart, but peaked at number 14 on the NZ Hot Singles Chart.)	—	—	—		Sable
"Awards Season"	2024	—	—	—	—	—	—	— (Note: "Awards Season" did not enter the NZ Top 40 Singles Chart, but peaked at number 35 on the NZ Hot Singles Chart.)	—	—	—		Sable
"Short Story"	2025	—	—	—	—	—	—	— (Note: "Short Story" did not enter the NZ Top 40 Singles Chart, but peaked at number 17 on the NZ Hot Singles Chart.)	—	—	—		Sable, Fable
"Day One" (featuring Dijon and Flock of Dimes)	2025	—	48	—	—	—	—	— (Note: "Day One" did not enter the NZ Top 40 Singles Chart, but peaked at number 11 on the NZ Hot Singles Chart.)	—	—	—		Sable, Fable
"From"	2025	—	— (Note: "From" did not enter the Hot Rock & Alternative Songs chart, but peaked at number 12 on the Adult Alternative Airplay chart.)	—	—	—	—	— (Note: "From" did not enter the NZ Top 40 Singles Chart, but peaked at number 15 on the NZ Hot Singles Chart.)	—	—	—		Sable, Fable
"There's a Rhythmn"	2025	—	35	—	—	—	—	— (Note: "There's a Rhythmn" did not enter the NZ Top 40 Singles Chart, but peaked at number 5 on the NZ Hot Singles Chart.)	—	—	—		Sable, Fable
"Tie You Down" (Haim featuring Bon Iver)	2025	—	—	—	—	—	—	— (Note: "Short Story" did not enter the NZ Top 40 Singles Chart, but peaked at number 26 on the NZ Hot Singles Chart.)	—	—	—		I Quit (Deluxe)
"Sins of The Father" (Daniel Caesar featuring Bon Iver)	2025	— (Note: "Sins of the Father" did not make the Billboard Hot 100, but did chart at number 22 on the Hot R&B Songs chart.)	—	—	—	—	—	—	—	—	—		Son of Spergy
"—" denotes releases that did not chart

== Guest appearances ==
List of non-single guest appearances, with other performing artists, showing year released and album name
Title	Year	Other artist(s)	Album
"Brackett, WI"	2009	—N/a	Dark Was the Night
"For Emma" (live)	2009	—N/a	Live at the World Cafe Vol. 27
"Rosyln"	2009	St. Vincent	The Twilight Saga: New Moon (Original Motion Picture Soundtrack)
"Dark Fantasy"	2010	Kanye West, Teyana Taylor, Nicki Minaj	My Beautiful Dark Twisted Fantasy
"Lost in the World"	2010	Kanye West	My Beautiful Dark Twisted Fantasy
"Naked"	2013	Travis Scott	Owl Pharaoh
"I Am a God"	2013	Kanye West	Yeezus
"Hold My Liquor"	2013	Kanye West, Chief Keef	Yeezus
"I'm In It"	2013	Kanye West, Assassin	Yeezus
"Come Talk to Me"	2013	—N/a	And I'll Scratch Yours
"Heavenly Father"	2014	—N/a	Wish I Was Here (Music From The Motion Picture)
"Do You Need Power? (Walk Out Music)"	2018	—N/a	Creed II: The Album
"Fall"	2018	Eminem	Kamikaze
"Dionne"	2020	The Japanese House	Chewing Cotton Wool
"Evermore"	2020	Taylor Swift	Evermore
"Second Nature"	2021	—N/a	Don't Look Up (Soundtrack from the Netflix Film)
"My Eyes"	2023	Travis Scott, Sampha	Utopia
"Delresto (Echoes)"	2023	Beyoncé, Travis Scott	Utopia
"Boys of Faith"	2023	Zach Bryan	Boys of Faith
"I Think About It All the Time"	2024	Charli XCX	Brat and It's Completely Different but Also Still Brat

== Selected compilations, soundtracks and guest appearances ==
- "Brackett, WI" released on Dark Was the Night (February 17, 2009 – 3 x LP & 2 x CD).
- "For Emma" (live) released on Live at the World Cafe Vol. 27 (2009 – U.S. CD)
- "Skinny Love" (live) released on "Later... Live^{2} with Jools Holland" (October 12, 2009 – 2 x CD)
- "Rosyln" (with St. Vincent) released on The Twilight Saga: New Moon: Original Motion Picture Soundtrack (October 19, 2009 – CD. December 2009 – 2 x LP)
- "Flume", "Wisconsin" and "Soft Light" featured on the feature film The Builder by R. Alverson (July 27, 2010 – DVD)
- My Beautiful Dark Twisted Fantasy by Kanye West (November 22, 2010 – CD); featuring Bon Iver on six total tracks including "Monster" and "Lost in the World". Writing credits for Justin Vernon and featuring Bon Iver on "Monster" and "Lost in The World".
- "The Wolves (Act I & II)" featured on the feature film Rust and Bone (October 29, 2012 – Film)
- "The Wolves (Act I & II)" featured on the feature film The Place Beyond the Pines (March 29, 2013 – Film)
- "Come Talk To Me" featured on And I'll Scratch Yours by Peter Gabriel (September 24, 2013)
- "Heavenly Father" released on the Wish I Was Here soundtrack (June 20, 2014 – CD/Digital)
- "re: stacks" featured in the feature film As Cool As I Am.
- "I Need a Forest Fire" features Bon Iver on James Blake's third studio album The Colour in Anything.

== Promotional videos ==
- "The Wolves (Acts I & II)" (2008 – directed by Matt Amato, filmed in Fall Creek, Wisconsin, January 2008)
- "Take Away Show" – (2008 – Limited 3-track DVD in hand stamped card sleeve, free with copies of For Emma, Forever Ago purchased from Rough Trade Records, November/December 2008)
- "Calgary" (2011 – Directed by Andre Durand and Dan Huiting)
- "Holocene" (2011 – Directed by Nabil Elderkin, filmed in Iceland)
- "Towers" (2012 – Directed by Nabil Elderkin, filmed in Washington state)
- "Bon Iver: Autumn" (2019 – Directed by Andrew Swant, filmed in Milwaukee, Wisconsin)

== Related releases ==
- Night of the Furies Remixed – The Rosebuds (April 2008 – download); featuring Justin Vernon remix of "Get Up, Get Out".
- Unmap – Volcano Choir (September 22, 2009 – CD, LP & download); featuring Justin Vernon.
- A Decade With Duke – Eau Claire Memorial High Jazz 1 featuring Justin Vernon (December 7, 2009 – U.S.-only 14-track CD & iTunes 8-track download).
- Hadestown – Anaïs Mitchell (April 9, 2010 – CD); featuring Justin Vernon.
- Relayted by Gayngs (May 2010 – CD, LP); featuring Justin Vernon and Mike Noyce.
- "Broken Hearts & Dirty Windows: Songs of John Prine" – by various artists (June 22, 2010 – CD); featuring Justin Vernon.
- High Violet by The National (May 11, 2010 – CD, LP download); featuring Justin Vernon.
- All We Grow – S. Carey debut album (August 24, 2010 – CD, LP and download); Sean Carey solo album.
- "Harbors" – All Tiny Creatures (2011); featuring Justin Vernon.
- "Grown Unknown" – Lia Ices (January 25, 2011); song "Daphne" featuring Justin Vernon.
- Watch the Throne by Jay-Z & Kanye West (August 12, 2011 – download); writing credits for Justin Vernon on "That's My Bitch", backing vocals on various tracks.
- If I Was by The Staves (March 2015 – CD, LP); produced by Justin Vernon & features CJ Camerieri, Matt McCaughan, Rob Moose, Justin Vernon.
