= Boys of Faith (song) =

2023 song by Zach Bryan featuring Bon Iver

Song by Zach Bryan featuring Bon Iver

from the EP Boys of Faith
- Released: September 22, 2023
- Genre: Country; country folk; Indie folk; Soft rock
- Length: 2:51
- Label: Warner; Belting Bronco
- Songwriters: Zach Bryan; Bon Iver
- Producer: self-produced

"Boys of Faith" is a song by American country music singer Zach Bryan—released on September 22, 2023, as the third track from his third extended play of the same name. The song features vocals from American indie folk band Bon Iver, who wrote the song alongside Bryan. Produced by Bryan himself and receiving acclaim from music critics, the song debuted and peaked at number 26 on the US Billboard Hot 100.

== Composition ==
"Boys of Faith" is a country, country folk, indie folk, and soft rock song (or simply a melancholic song) with a tempo of 200 BPM. "Boys of Faith" has a running time of two minutes and fifty-one seconds with a C♯/D♭ key and a major mode. The song has a time signature of four beats per bar.

== Critical reception ==
Maxim Mower of Holler noted that based on the EPs track listing, "that Zach is exploring a more folk-inspired sound compared to his self-titled album and his earlier material." In the same review, Mower noted "the title track ["Boys of Faith"] epitomizes this [what was previously noted], while Zach Bryan immersing himself in the ethereal world of Bon Iver." Mower also later noted in the review that "‘Boys Of Faith’ coasts across an unstoppable wave of nostalgia, with Zach Bryan beginning by outlining how he's been spending time with a group of his old friends."

Maddie Kane of Wildcats Wired ranked all five tracks from the EP Boys of Faith, ranking "Boys of Faith" a 7 out of 10, Kane later stated in the review: "’Boys of Faith’ is about reuniting with old friends and reminiscing about the memories shared. The song expresses many emotions including frustration about how slow- paced life is, and disappointment in current circumstances." Later in the same review Kane said, "A sense of lost hope and goals unfulfilled can be assumed based on the lyrics in the song. This song ["Boys of Faith"] is very catchy and has a great tune."

== Charts ==
Weekly chart performance for "Boys of Faith"
Chart (2023)	Peak position
Canada Hot 100 (Billboard)	24
Global 200 (Billboard)	5
New Zealand Hot Singles (RMNZ)	7
US Billboard Hot 100	26
US Hot Country Songs (Billboard)	9

== Certifications ==
Certifications for "Boys of Faith"
Region	Certification	Certified units/sales
Canada (Music Canada)	Platinum	80,000^{‡}
United States (RIAA)	Platinum	1,000,000^{‡}
^{‡} Sales+streaming figures based on certification alone.
