= Hundred Acres =

Studio album by S. Carey
- Released: February 23, 2018
- Length: 37:45
- Label: Jagjaguwar

S. Carey chronology
| Range of Light (2014) | Hundred Acres (2018) |

Professional ratings
Aggregate scores
| Source | Rating |
|---|---|
| Metacritic | 68/100 |
Review scores
| Source | Rating |
| AllMusic | 3.5/5 stars |
| Drowned in Sound | 8/10 |
| Paste Magazine | 7.8/10 |

Hundred Acres is the third studio album by American musician S. Carey. It was released in February 2018 under Jagjaguwar.

== Track listing ==
| No. | Title | Length |
|---|---|---|
| 1. | "Rose Petals" | 3:33 |
| 2. | "Hideout" | 2:53 |
| 3. | "Yellowstone" | 3:50 |
| 4. | "True North" | 4:35 |
| 5. | "Emery" | 2:53 |
| 6. | "Hundred Acres" | 3:51 |
| 7. | "More I See" | 4:03 |
| 8. | "Fool's Gold" | 4:14 |
| 9. | "Have You Stopped to Notice" | 3:57 |
| 10. | "Meadow Song" | 3:56 |

== Charts ==
| Chart | Peak position |
|---|---|
| US Heatseekers Albums (Billboard) | 13 |
| US Independent Albums (Billboard) | 43 |
