= Rosemary & Garlic =

Folk band from the Netherlands

Rosemary & Garlic is a dutch folk band composed of Anne van den Hoogen and Dolf Smolenaers.

== Background ==
The band is from Utrecht and is composed of Anne van den Hoogen and Dolf Smolenaers. Van den Hoogen was previously the backing vocalist for another band that Smoldenaers was in. Van den Hoogen studied at Radboud University where she received a degree in Literary Studies and developed an interest in the Romanticism movement.

The duo started gaining in popularity when Simon Raymonde started playing their music on his radio show and Laura Marling added their music to one of her Spotify playlists. The duo received a significant number of listeners because they were added to various Spotify playlists. The band was part of the 2018 South by Southwest music festival.

They released their first EP in 2015 entitled The Kingfisher. In 2018, they released their debut album which was self-titled Rosemary & Garlic and produced by Nettwerk. The album artwork was created by Gregory Euclide. In 2020, they released the single "Frames". The group released their sophomore album in 2023, entitled A Room Of One's Own.

== Discography ==
=== Studio albums ===
- Rosemary & Garlic (2018)
- A Room of One's Own (2023)

=== Extended plays ===
- The Kingfisher (2017)
- A Step Outside (2019)

=== Singles ===
- "I'm Here (Spring Version)" (2018)
- "Blue Boy" (2018)
- "Beautiful" (2018)
- "Dreamer (Live in Amsterdam)" (2019)
- "Frames" (2020)
- "One Last Night" (with Plàsi) (2021)
- "Television" (2022)
- "Their Eyes on Me" (2022)
- "Midlands" (2022)
- "Summer" (2023)
- "Alfie (Acoustic)" (2023)
- "American Boy (Acoustic)" (2023)

=== Guest appearances ===
- Paper Towns – "Is It Really Over" (2021)
- Paper Towns – "Is It Really Over" from For What It's Worth (2022)
- Plàsi – "One Last Night" from Foreign Sea (2022)
