= S. Carey =

American musician

Sean Carey
- Born: Sean Carey
- Origin: Lake Geneva, Wisconsin
- Genres: Ambient; chamber pop; indie folk
- Years active: 2008–present
- Label: Jagjaguwar
- Website: scarey.org

Sean Carey, also known as S. Carey, is an American musician from Lake Geneva, Wisconsin, best known as the drummer and supporting vocalist of indie folk band Bon Iver. He is a two-time Grammy Award winner for his work with the band. In August 2010, Carey released his first solo album, All We Grow, which he began working on in 2008 during hiatuses from performing with the band.

== Background ==
Carey grew up in Lake Geneva, Wisconsin. As the child of a singer and a music teacher, he has been immersed in music his entire life. He was raised listening to James Taylor, The Beach Boys, and Bruce Hornsby. At the age of ten he learned to play the drums and developed a deep love of jazz percussion after hearing his oldest sister perform in the middle school jazz band.

In 2007, Carey graduated from the University of Wisconsin–Eau Claire with a performance degree in classical percussion. That same year, upon hearing through mutual friends that Justin Vernon was planning on forming a band (Bon Iver), Carey listened to For Emma, Forever Ago on MySpace until he had learned all the songs. Said Carey:

They weren’t just good songs, they were great, interesting, unique; it’s a beautiful album. So I spent two weeks holed up in my bedroom with laptop, headphones and notebook, and I wrote down all the drum parts and learned all the lyrics, melodies and harmonies. When the band I was in opened for Justin at his first local show as Bon Iver, I told him I knew all his songs and I wanted to play with him.

After singing a few songs backstage, Vernon and Carey realized how good their voices sounded together. Vernon asked Carey to play the show with him that night, and officially signed him to the band later that same evening.

== Solo career and debut album ==
Carey's solo career came about semi-accidentally. After each month-long stint of touring with Bon Iver, Carey would return to Eau Claire for three weeks. During his time at home, Carey would record songs and experiment with layering sounds together.

I didn't start out thinking I was going to write an album. I had a couple song ideas, and it just went from there. I recorded a few songs, and as time went on I got further into those songs and recorded more layers, then I had friends come over and record stuff I couldn't play, and by that time I had come up with more songs until finally I just had this full length thing.

Carey recorded most of the music on All We Grow by himself with few exceptions. Jeremy Boettcher (bass), Nick Ball (guitar), and Bon Iver bandmate Mike Noyce (viola) played a large percentage of the music that Carey could not. Sean's sister Shannon Carey provided background vocals on two tracks, and Aaron Hedenstrom and Chris Thompson provided miscellaneous musical support.

The song "In the Dirt" appears in the last scene of the episode "The Dig" from the Season 7 of the TV series House M.D. and also in the last scene of the episode "What Went Wrong" from season 3 of the TV series The Good Wife.

Carey produced and appears on Owen's ninth album The King of Whys.

Carey provided backing vocals for many tracks on Sufjan Stevens' 2015 album Carrie & Lowell, and was featured by name in the demo version of the track "Eugene" released on the 10th anniversary edition of the album.

Comparisons have been drawn between Carey's harmonies and those of Brian Wilson in his 2004 album Smile. His music has also been likened to that of Sufjan Stevens, Fleet Foxes, Iron & Wine, José González, Steve Reich, and Talk Talk.

== Performances ==
From September 8 to October 3, 2010, S. Carey toured North America with Swedish folk singer Kristian Matsson, otherwise known as The Tallest Man on Earth. During that time, the group performed fourteen times in Vancouver, Seattle, California, Arizona, Texas, Toronto, Montreal, New York City, Pennsylvania, and Washington DC. When asked what it was like touring with Matsson, Carey responded:

He is honestly one of the greatest performers in the world right now. He is captivating. His guitar playing, singing, his songs, lyrics — they’re all amazing. We are so honored to be on this tour.

S. Carey performed at CMJ 2010, and was considered "the most buzzed-about act of the day." He spent a great deal of the summer of 2011 opening for David Bazan before joining the Bon Iver tour as band director and one of two drummers.

== Awards ==
Award	Year	Category	Work	Result
Grammy Award	2012	Record of the Year	"Holocene" by Bon Iver	Nominated
Grammy Award	2012	Best Alternative Music Album	Bon Iver by Bon Iver	Won
Grammy Award	2012	Best New Artist	Bon Iver	Won
Grammy Award	2020	Album of the Year	I, I by Bon Iver	Nominated
Grammy Award	2020	Best Alternative Music Album	I, I by Bon Iver	Nominated
Grammy Award	2020	Record of the Year	"Hey, Ma" by Bon Iver	Nominated

== Discography ==
=== Albums ===
Title	Album details
All We Grow	Released: August 24, 2010; Formats: LP, CD, digital download, streaming; Label: Jagjaguwar
Range of Light	Released: April 1, 2014; Formats: LP, CD, digital download, streaming; Label: Jagjaguwar
Hundred Acres	Released: February 23, 2018; Formats: LP, CD, digital download, streaming; Label: Jagjaguwar
Break Me Open	Released: April 22, 2022; Formats: LP, CD, digital download, streaming; Label: Jagjaguwar
Shadowlands	Released: September 15, 2023; Formats: LP, CD, digital download, streaming; Label: Libellule Editions

=== EPs ===
Title	Album details
Hoyas	Released: May 8, 2012; Formats: EP, CD, digital download, streaming; Label: Jagjaguwar
Supermoon	Released: February 17, 2015; Formats: EP, CD, digital download, streaming; Label: Jagjaguwar
Watercress	Released: October 3, 2025; Formats: LP, Digital download, streaming; Label: Jagjaguwar
