= Sarah's Place =

2023 song by Zach Bryan featuring Noah Kahan

Song by Zach Bryan featuring Noah Kahan

from the EP Boys of Faith
- Released: September 22, 2023
- Genre: Country; country folk; Western swing
- Length: 3:34
- Label: Warner; Belting Bronco
- Songwriters: Zach Bryan; Noah Kahan
- Producer: Zach Bryan

"Sarah's Place" is a song by American country music singer Zach Bryan. Released on September 22, 2023, as the second track from his third extended play, Boys of Faith. The song features vocals from American singer—songwriter Noah Kahan, who co-wrote the song with Bryan. The song was produced by Bryan and became the highest charting track from the EP, debuting and peaking at number 14 on the US Billboard Hot 100.

== Composition ==
"Sarah's Place" is a country—country folk song that incorporates sounds of country jazz (or "Western swing"). The song has a tempo of 152 BPM which can be used at half-time at 76 BPM, or double-time at 304 BPM. "Sarah's Place" has a running time of 3 minutes and 34 seconds with a G key and a major mode. The song has a time signature of 4 beats per bar.

== Charts ==
Chart performance for "Sarah's Place"
Chart (2023)	Peak position
Canada Hot 100 (Billboard)	13
Global 200 (Billboard)	41
New Zealand Hot Singles (RMNZ)	5
US Billboard Hot 100	14
US Hot Country Songs (Billboard)	5

== Certifications ==
Certifications for "Sarah's Place"
Region	Certification	Certified units/sales
Canada (Music Canada)	3× Platinum	240,000^{‡}
New Zealand (RMNZ)	Gold	15,000^{‡}
United Kingdom (BPI)	Silver	200,000^{‡}
United States (RIAA)	Platinum	1,000,000^{‡}
^{‡} Sales+streaming figures based on certification alone.
