= Hoyas (EP) =

EP by S. Carey
- Released: May 8, 2012
- Genres: Electronic, Indietronica, Indie Pop, Ambient
- Length: 18:17
- Label: Jagjaguwar

S. Carey chronology
All We Grow (2010)	Hoyas (2012)	Range of Light (2014)

Professional ratings
Aggregate scores
Source	Rating
Metacritic	59/100
Review scores
Source	Rating
No Ripcord	7/10
PopMatters	4/10

Hoyas is an EP from American musician S. Carey. It was released in May 2012 under Jagjaguwar Records.

== Track listing ==
No.	Title	Writer(s)	Length
1.	"Two Angles"	S. Carey, Ben Lester	5:27
2.	"Avalanche"	S. Carey	5:01
3.	"Inspir"	S. Carey, Ben Lester	3:58
4.	"Marfa"	S. Carey	3:51

== Personnel ==
- S. Carey - Primary Artist, Composer
- Ben Lester - Composer, Drums
- Nick Ball - Guitar
- Andy Hofer - Trombone
- Brian Joseph - Mixing
- Daniel Murphy - Design
