= Gregory Euclide =

American painter

Gregory Euclide (born 1974) is an American contemporary artist and teacher who lives and works outside of Minneapolis, Minnesota.

== Early life and education ==
Born in Cedarburg, Wisconsin, (1974) and raised there before moving to Minnesota, his natural surroundings informed an interest in the environment. Gregory Euclide holds a Master of Fine Arts (MFA) in studio art from the Minneapolis College of Art and Design in 2008, a B.F.A. (Bachelor of Fine Arts) in Studio Art from the University of Wisconsin-Oshkosh, Wisconsin (University Scholar, 1997), and a B.A.E. (Bachelor of Arts in Education) in Secondary Art Education (K-12) from the University of Wisconsin-Oshkosh, Wisconsin (University Scholar, 1997).

== Career ==
Gregory Euclide creates sculptural relief works, paintings, and installations. His works consist of non-traditional mixed media assemblages which resemble landscape paintings, often in unfamiliar style. While Euclide's works explore ideas surrounding nature and the human experience, they remain void of the human figure. Euclide juxtaposes in his work naturally occurring organic matter with artificial, man-made materials, some of which are found objects, and through the use of bent and shaped paper introduces three-dimensional topographical elements.

Gregory Euclide, Untitled (Bon Iver, Bon Iver cover art), 2011, acrylic, buckthorn root, dirt, found foam, geranium, moss, mylar, paper, pencil, photo transfer, pine cone, sedum, snow, sponge, 35 x 35 × 6 inches

Through his exploration of the landscape tradition, within both his self-contained works and largescale installations, by incorporating architectural elements Euclide reminds the viewer that though many people associate charming imagery such as barns and farm fields with nature, these structures and spaces are engineered, and even when looking at a remote pastoral scene, it is impossible to escape the human fingerprint. For the exhibition Otherworldly: Artist Dioramas and Small Spectacles, which opened June 2011 at the Museum of Arts and Design in New York City, Euclide created a room-sized installation, a consuming 7×5-foot landscape painting in a gilded gold frame with several dioramas extending across the floor of the gallery.

In 2009, Euclide did a large "capture" work with a 55-gallon drum taken from Clear Creek Canyon, a tourist destination near Denver, and displayed it at the David B. Smith Gallery with a life-sized guardrail representing a scenic pull-off. Works by Gregory Euclide have been exhibited at the Foothills Art Center in Golden, Colorado, the Pulse Art Fair in Miami, Florida, The Joseph Gross Gallery at the University of Arizona, Tucson, and the Minneapolis College of Art and Design as well a site-specific installation for the inauguration of the Denver Biennial of the Americas.

In 2011, Euclide collaborated with the Justin Vernon of Bon Iver to create the band's acclaimed album artwork for their 2011 album Bon Iver, winner of the Grammy for Best New Artist.

Euclide created beautiful detailed temporary ink designs on classroom dry erase boards, for relaxation during his 25-minute lunch break, while teaching high school students in the Minnesota River Valley and Prior Lake, and then wiped them clean. He used available classroom objects including whiteboard erasers, paper towels, spray bottles, brushes and Japanese Sumi ink. He wanted to show his students the possible achievements that happen in a short space of time and the impermanence of existence. Euclide sees the concept of accepting impermanence to society's impact on the natural world. When he casually wiped away his art creations, the students reacted with extreme dismay making Euclide decide to release a series of the temporary ephemeral artworks.

== Collections ==
Gregory Euclide's work is featured in the collections of the Progressive Corporation (Mayfield Village, Ohio), Flint Institute of Arts (Flint, Michigan), Microsoft Corporation (Redmond, Washington), United States Embassy in Sarajevo, Wellington Management Company (Boston, Massachusetts), Dex Media (Denver, Colorado), Nordstrom (Seattle, Washington), and Health Partners (Minneapolis, Minnesota).

== Exhibitions ==
=== Selected solo exhibitions ===
2012

- Gregory Euclide: Nature Out There, Nevada Museum of Art, Reno, NV

2011

- David B. Smith Gallery, Denver, CO

2010

- IMPULSE, PULSE Art Fair, Miami, FL
- Real, Natural, Unsustainable, The Joseph Gross Gallery, The University of Arizona – Tucson, Tucson, AZ
- What Was Still in the Pause of My Advance, Merry Karnowsky Gallery, Los Angeles, CA
- Making Paintings About Nature’s Making, Conkling Gallery, Minnesota State University, Mankato, Mankato, MN

2009

- David B. Smith Gallery, Denver, CO

2008

- Gage Family Art Gallery, Augsburg College, Minneapolis, MN
- Limited Addiction Gallery, Denver, CO

=== Selected group exhibitions ===
2011

- Otherworldly, Museum of Arts and Design, New York, NY
- Middle States, Anderson Gallery, Drake University, Des Moines, IA
- Pure Paper, Rena Bransten Gallery, San Francisco, CA
- Habitat, Foothills Art Center, Golden, CO
- PULSE Art Fair, New York, NY

2010

- The Nature of Things, Biennial of the Americas, Denver, CO
- Refresh, Christina Ray, New York, NY
- SCOPE Art Show New York, David B. Smith Gallery, New York, NY
- David B. Smith Group Exhibition, Part 1, David B. Smith, Denver, CO
- Who Killed The Music, Grammy Awards, Los Angeles, CA

2009

- Open Studios Midwestern Competition Vol. 83, New American Paintings

Juror: Lynne Warren, Curator of the Museum of Contemporary Art, Chicago, IL

- Studio Visit Magazine Vol. 5, The Open Studios Press

Juror: Ian Berry, Associate Director for Curatorial Affairs and Curator at the Tang Teaching Museum and Art Gallery at Skidmore College

- Scope Art Fair New York, David B. Smith Gallery, New York, NY
- You, Me, and Everyone We Know, Alphonse Berber Gallery, Berkeley, CA
- New Landscapes, Groveland Gallery, Minneapolis, MN
- David B. Smith Group Exhibition, Part 1, David B. Smith, Denver, CO
- Selections from the International Drawing Annual, Manifest Gallery, Cincinnati, OH
- Regime Change, Swarm Gallery, Oakland, CA

2008

- 58th Arrowhead Biennial, Duluth Art Institute, Duluth, MN

Juror: Kris Douglas, Chief Curator at the Rochester Art Center

- Studio Visit Magazine Vol. 4, The Open Studios Press

Juror: Michael Klein, Former Director of the International Sculpture Center and the Microsoft Collection

- Studio Visit Magazine Vol. 3, The Open Studios Press

Juror: Carl Belz, Director Emeritus, The Rose Art Museum at Brandeis University

- North of the 45th, DeVos Art Museum, MI

Juror: John Corbett, Corbett vs. Dempsey Gallery

- Open Door 4, Rosalux Gallery, Minneapolis, MN

Juror: Yasmil Raymond, Assistant Curator, Walker Art Center

- Made at MCAD, Minneapolis College of Art and Design, Minneapolis, MN

Juror: Yasmil Raymond, Assistant Curator, Walker Art Center

- 37th Annual Americas 2008: Paperworks Exhibition, Northwest Art Center, Minot, ND

Juror: Elizabeth Dove, Associate Professor The Department of Art The University of Montana

- Badlands: New Horizons in Landscape, MASS MoCA, North Adams, MA
- The Woolworth Windows, Tacoma Contemporary, Tacoma, WA
- Sublime Landscape, Project 4 Gallery, Washington DC
- Landscape, Nature and Space, Bucheon Gallery, San Francisco, CA
- MFA Thesis Exhibition: MCAD, Soo Visual Art Center, Minneapolis, MN
- 365, 111 Minna Gallery, San Francisco, CA
- Aqua Art Miami Wynwood, David B. Smith Gallery, Miami, FL
- Red Dot Fair New York, Limited Addiction Gallery, New York, NY

== See also ==
- Bon Iver
