= Michael Klein (art dealer) =

American art dealer

Michael Klein (born January 23, 1952) is an artist’s agent and freelance consultant and curator for individuals, institutions and arts organizations, writer, curator, and program director currently operating Michael Klein Arts in New York City.

== History ==
=== Michael Klein Gallery ===
Between 1983 and 1997 Klein was owner and director of Michael Klein Gallery, New York representing some 20 emerging and mid career American and European artists.

=== Microsoft Art Collection ===
Klein served as the first Curator for the Microsoft Art Collection based in Redmond, Washington between 1999 and 2005 directing art acquisitions, commissions, collection management and an education program for the company’s 50,000 employees.

=== International Sculpture Center ===
Klein was the Executive Director of the International Sculpture Center from 2005 to 2007.

=== Michael Klein Arts ===
Michael Klein Arts services institutional as well as private collectors with an eye to developing collections of emerging, mid career and established artists. Today Michael Klein Arts works with a diverse group of artists including Sanford Biggers, Glenn Goldberg, Charles Goldman, Ken Lum and Sam Van Aken.

== Curator ==
As an independent curator Klein has organized museum and gallery exhibitions specializing in contemporary and 20th-century art topics in the areas of painting, sculpture and photography for Independent Curators International; Contemporary Arts Center, Cincinnati; Contemporary Arts Museum, USF, Tampa; Arthur Roger Gallery, New Orleans; and Meadows Museum, Shreveport, LA.

== Writer ==
Klein has been a regular contributor to Sculpture Magazine in addition to writing reviews and feature articles for Art in America, ARTnews, Artnet and theartsection.com. He has authored catalog essays on such artists as David Bates, Lynda Benglis, Jane Dickson, Mel Kendrick, Alex Katz, Louise Nevelson and Paul Thek, as well as articles on Jonathan Borofsky, Sol LeWitt, Malcolm Morley, Matthew McCaslin and H.C. Westermann.

== Educator ==
Klein serves as adjunct faculty to Pratt Institute in Brooklyn and New York University in New York. He taught fine arts at the School of Visual Arts from 1979–1982 and art history at Kean University from 1996 – 1998.
