= All We Grow =

Studio album by S. Carey
- Released: August 24, 2010
- Recorded: 2008–2010
- Genre: Ambient; chamber pop; indie folk
- Length: 43:54
- Label: Jagjaguwar
- Producer: S. Carey

S. Carey chronology
All We Grow (2010)	Hoyas (2012)

Professional ratings
Review scores
Source	Rating
Metacritic	73/100
The Independent	4/5 stars
musicOMH	4.5/5 stars
Pitchfork Media	7.5/10 stars
PopMatters	6/10 stars
Slant Magazine	4/5 stars
AllMusic	3.5/5 stars

All We Grow is the debut album of S. Carey. The album was recorded over a period of two years at Carey's home and at Justin Vernon's studio during breaks from touring with Bon Iver. Carey has cited Justin Vernon, Megafaun, Bowerbirds, A.A. Bondy, Collections of Colonies of Bees, Feist, and Sigur Rós as some of his major inspirations for All We Grow.

The album was well received by both audiences and critics. On Metacritic it has a rating of 73 out of 100 based on 15 reviews.

== Instruments ==
Carey, who graduated from University of Wisconsin–Eau Claire with a performance degree in classical percussion, makes use of myriad instruments in this album. Alongside the drums, guitar, and piano, one can hear oboe, timpani, viola, xylophone, upright bass, flute, and saxophone.

== Reception ==
At Metacritic, which assigns a normalized rating out of 100 to reviews from mainstream critics, the album has an average score of 73 out of 100, which indicates "generally favorable reviews" based on thirteen reviews. The AllMusic review by Ned Raggett awarded the album 3.5 stars stating "If anything, All We Grow further suggests an Upper Midwest of the mind, with the Wisconsin-based Carey creating pieces like "Move" and "In the Dirt" that aren't so much songs as ambient meditation as they are songs as quietly dramatic atmospherics—one almost wants to imagine the album being the sonic setting for a movie or a short story with fresh snow against a slate-gray sky. Meanwhile, the hints of the obsessive minimalism drawing on his educational background can readily be heard in the brisk, immediate piano parts of "We Fell" and "In the Stream," where the rhythms are provided by keys rather than drums (themselves notable for their near complete absence from the album, though the percussive touches on "Action" add much to the song's building conclusion)... It's also nice to hear vocals like Carey's, which gently suggest a Brian Wilson sense of harmonizing instead of fully pushing the point—refreshing given so many of Carey's compatriots in indie-leaning rock music. ".

== Track listing ==
All tracks by S. Carey

No.	Title	Length
1.	"Move"	3:07
2.	"We Fell"	4:55
3.	"In the Dirt"	5:19
4.	"Rothko Fields"	1:53
5.	"Mothers"	5:03
6.	"Action"	2:46
7.	"In the Stream"	5:11
8.	"All We Grow"	4:39
9.	"Broken"	6:42
10.	"Leave" (Bonus Track)	4:30

== Personnel ==
- Nick Ball – guitar, percussion
- Jeremy Boettcher – electric bass, upright bass
- S. Carey – guitar, instrumentation, mixing, percussion, piano, vibraphone, vocals
- Shannon Carey – vocals
- Jaime Hansen – engineer, mixing
- Aaron Hedenstrom – clarinet, woodwind
- Brian Joseph – engineer, mixing
- Ben Lester – pedal steel
- Daniel Murphy – design
- Mike Noyce – viola
- Roger Seibel – mastering
- Chris Thomson – bass clarinet, woodwind
- Cameron Wittig – photography
