= Zach Bryan (album) =

2023 studio album by Zach Bryan

Studio album by Zach Bryan
- Released: August 25, 2023
- Genre: Country rock
- Length: 54:23
- Labels: Belting Bronco; Warner
- Producers: Zach Bryan; Eddie Spear

Zach Bryan chronology
All My Homies Hate Ticketmaster (Live from Red Rocks) (2022)	Zach Bryan (2023)	Boys of Faith (2023)

Singles from Zach Bryan
- 1. "I Remember Everything" Released: September 8, 2023

Zach Bryan is the fourth studio album by American singer-songwriter Zach Bryan. It was released on August 25, 2023, through Belting Bronco and Warner. Entirely self-produced (except for the song "Oklahoman Son" produced by Eddie Spear), it features guest appearances by the War and Treaty, Sierra Ferrell, Kacey Musgraves, and the Lumineers. At the 66th Annual Grammy Awards the project received three nominations, including for Best Country Album, winning his first Grammy for Best Country Duo/Group Performance for the lead collaboration "I Remember Everything" with Musgraves.

Commercially the album debuted atop the US Billboard 200 with the biggest streaming week for a rock album, while its only single "I Remember Everything" became the first song to debut at number one on the US Billboard Hot 100, Hot Country Songs, and Hot Rock & Alternative Songs charts simultaneously.

In support of the album, Bryan embarked on the Quittin Time Tour '24 throughout 2024. It began on March 6 at the United Center in Chicago, Illinois, and ended on December 19 at the Barclays Center in Brooklyn, New York. This tour was the first one he went on after releasing the album six months prior. The Quittin Time tour had a gross profit of almost $200 million. He sold out 81 venues in total netting over 1.8 million tickets sold. The tours success was largely due to the success of the Zach Bryan Album, especially hit song "I Remember Everything". Staying strictly within the U.S. for this tour but seeing success with the album in other countries prompted him to perform in the U.K. in 2025.

== Background and composition ==
Bryan revealed that there is "no grand explanation" or "riddle in reasoning" behind any of the songs on the album. Instead, he simply described them as "poems and songs" he wanted to share because he thought they were special. He referred to the tracks as "heavy" and "hopeful" but what matters most to him is that they are his. Upon release, Bryan announced that listeners should not come into the album thinking it would be a "chart topper" or that this was his "intent", otherwise they would be "severely disappointed".

Bryan first shared previews of ten tracks on June 25, 2023, on his Instagram and hinted at an upcoming album release. He also revealed that this record was for him and that he does not care if listeners like it. The singer-songwriter announced the album with details about the cover and track listing on August 9. This album was somewhat of an unconventional release from Bryan as he previewed singles from it two months prior to release. The songs had no specific meaning, but instead were just made for the love of making music and found these songs to be special. The rawness and relatability of this album played into the great success it had. He collaborated with several different artists/bands who Bryan has admired during his time making music career. In other albums he created QR codes that granted access to previews on singles, creations of how songs were made, and other behind the scenes footage of the album's creation that also enhance the listeners experiences leading up to the release of the album. Unlike other albums that used QR codes, social media was the only form of marketing this album had. The album was self-produced and marketed through social media rather than large market promotions which made it more authentic to his fans, and built a strong connection.

Consisting of 16 tracks, Zach Bryan is a country rock album that incorporates elements of indie rock, folk, and country music. Bryan's songwriting is rooted in folk and heartland rock tradition of emotional exploration, and it details personal sentiments revolving heartbreak, loss, and nostalgia. According to Rolling Stone's Jeff Gage, the narratives of the Zach Bryan songs evoke Southern Gothic.

== Critical reception ==
Professional ratings
Aggregate scores
Source	Rating
Metacritic	79/100
Review scores
Source	Rating
AllMusic	4/5 stars
And It Don't Stop	A
Paste	8.1/10
Pitchfork	6.7/10
Rolling Stone	4/5 stars

Zach Bryan received a score of 79 out of 100 on review aggregator Metacritic based on four critics' reviews, indicating "generally favorable" reception. In a positive review, Maura Johnston of Rolling Stone opined that Bryan showcases a "careful presentation of his obvious songwriting talents" which makes for a "gripping listen" and praised his ability to not only give his songs room to breathe but "to seethe and yearn". Johnston thought the album was a blend between "hooky Nashville storytelling" and "Americana realism". Sam Sodomsky of Pitchfork wrote that Bryan "works with a traditionalist's appreciation for songwriting and the intense, earnest emotion of heartland rock", concluding that his "fierce determination also ends up being his saving grace. Whatever effect his songs have on you, there's never any doubt they're coming from the heart".

=== Year-end lists ===
Select year-end rankings of Zach Bryan
Publication/critic	Accolade	Rank	Ref.
Consequence	The 50 Best Albums of 2023	8	
The New York Times	Jon Caramanica's Best Albums of 2023	8	
Rolling Stone	The 100 Best Albums of 2023	10	
The Ringer	The 27 Best Albums of 2023	23	

== Commercial performance ==
Zach Bryan debuted at number one on the US Billboard 200 with 200,000 album-equivalent units (including 17,000 in pure album sales), the largest week for a rock album in four years and Bryan's first number-one album. It also earned the largest streaming week for a rock album in Billboard chart history. Zach Bryan remained atop the US Billboard 200 in its second week, moving an additional 115,000 album-equivalent units (including 3,000 in pure album sales), being a 42% decrease from its debut week.

Zach Bryan fell two places to number three in its third week on the US Billboard 200, moving an additional 95,000 album-equivalent units. In the albums fourth week of charting on the US Billboard 200, it remained at number three—moving an additional 79,000 album-equivalent units thus bringing Zach Bryan’s four week total to 489,000 units earned.

The album also debuted at number one in Canada, and New Zealand, and at number two in Australia and Ireland.

== Track listing ==
All tracks written by Zach Bryan except where noted; tracks also produced by Bryan except "Oklahoman Son" produced by Eddie Spear.

Zach Bryan track listing
No.	Title	Length
1.	"Fear and Fridays (Poem)"	1:47
2.	"Overtime"	3:10
3.	"Summertime's Close"	3:06
4.	"East Side of Sorrow"	3:29
5.	"Hey Driver" (featuring the War and Treaty)	3:47
6.	"Fear and Friday's"	2:51
7.	"Ticking" (Bryan, Justin Byrd)	4:02
8.	"Holy Roller" (featuring Sierra Ferrell)	3:36
9.	"Jake's Piano – Long Island"	5:19
10.	"El Dorado"	3:02
11.	"I Remember Everything" (featuring Kacey Musgraves) (Bryan, Musgraves)	3:47
12.	"Tourniquet"	3:09
13.	"Spotless" (featuring the Lumineers) (Bryan, Wesley Schultz, Jeremiah Fraites)	2:49
14.	"Tradesman"	3:07
15.	"Smaller Acts"	3:07
16.	"Oklahoman Son"	4:09
Total length:		54:23

== Personnel ==
Credits adapted from AllMusic.

Vocals

- Zach Bryan – lead vocals, vocals
- Read Connolly – background vocals
- Sierra Ferrell – background vocals, featured vocals (8)
- Noah Le Gros – background vocals
- The Lumineers – featured vocals (13)
- Kacey Musgraves – featured vocals (11)
- Lucas Ruge-Jones – background vocals
- The War and Treaty – featured vocals (5)
- Jacob Weinberg – background vocals

Musicians

- Zephyr Avalon – acoustic bass, bass
- Graham Bright – electric guitar
- Zach Bryan – acoustic guitar, bass, electric guitar, harmonica, percussion
- Daniel Chase – cello, viola, violin
- Steve Clark – acoustic guitar, drums
- Read Connolly – acoustic guitar, banjo, Dobro, steel guitar, percussion
- Noah Le Gros – acoustic guitar, Dobro, electric guitar, percussion
- The Lumineers – piano
- Hudson Pollack – piano
- Lucas Ruge-Jones – fiddle, percussion, trumpet
- The War and Treaty – piano
- Jacob Weinberg – bass, drums, organ, percussion, piano, Wurlitzer
- Scott Zhang – bass

Production

- Daniel Bacigalupi – assistant mastering engineer
- Zach Bryan – producer
- Jamie Hamburg – engineer
- Jacquire King – mixing engineer
- Pete Lyman – mastering engineer
- Dawson March – assistant mixing engineer
- Justin Miller – assistant engineer
- Eddie Spear – producer
- Jacob Weinberg – engineer
- Scott Zhang – engineer, mixing engineer

== Charts ==
=== Weekly charts ===
Weekly chart performance for Zach Bryan
Chart (2023–2026)	Peak position
Australian Albums (ARIA)	2
Australian Country Albums (ARIA)	1
Canadian Albums (Billboard)	1
Greek Albums (IFPI)	95
Hungarian Physical Albums (MAHASZ)	28
Icelandic Albums (Tónlistinn)	39
Irish Albums (Official Charts)	2
New Zealand Albums (RMNZ)	1
Norwegian Albums (VG-lista)	6
Scottish Albums (Official Charts)	29
Swedish Albums (Sverigetopplistan)	30
UK Albums (Official Charts)	22
UK Americana Albums (Official Charts)	1
UK Country Albums (Official Charts)	1
US Billboard 200	1
US Americana/Folk Albums (Billboard)	1
US Top Country Albums (Billboard)	1
US Top Rock & Alternative Albums (Billboard)	1

=== Year-end charts ===
2023 year-end chart performance for Zach Bryan
Chart (2023)	Position
Australian Albums (ARIA)	80
Canadian Albums (Billboard)	40
US Billboard 200	50
US Folk Albums (Billboard)	2
US Top Country Albums (Billboard)	12
US Top Rock & Alternative Albums (Billboard)	10

2024 year-end chart performance for Zach Bryan
Chart (2024)	Position
Australian Albums (ARIA)	31
Australian Country Albums (ARIA)	4
Canadian Albums (Billboard)	7
Global Albums (IFPI)	19
New Zealand Albums (RMNZ)	30
Swedish Albums (Sverigetopplistan)	56
US Billboard 200	7
US Folk Albums (Billboard)	2
US Top Country Albums (Billboard)	2
US Top Rock & Alternative Albums (Billboard)	2

2025 year-end chart performance for Zach Bryan
Chart (2025)	Position
Canadian Albums (Billboard)	30
US Billboard 200	43
US Top Country Albums (Billboard)	8
US Top Rock & Alternative Albums (Billboard)	7

== Certifications ==
Certifications for Zach Bryan
Region	Certification	Certified units/sales
Australia (ARIA)	Gold	35,000^{‡}
Canada (Music Canada)	5× Platinum	400,000^{‡}
Denmark (IFPI Danmark)	Gold	10,000^{‡}
New Zealand (RMNZ)	2× Platinum	30,000^{‡}
United Kingdom (BPI)	Gold	100,000^{‡}
United States (RIAA)	3× Platinum	3,000,000^{‡}
^{‡} Sales+streaming figures based on certification alone.
