= Fall Creek Boys Choir =

Single by James Blake and Bon Iver

from the album Enough Thunder and James Blake (Deluxe Edition)
- Released: 29 August 2011
- Recorded: 2011
- Genre: Ambient; soul; post-dubstep
- Length: 4:33
- Label: Polydor
- Songwriters: James Blake; Justin Vernon
- Producers: James Blake; Justin Vernon

James Blake singles chronology
| "Order / Pan" (2011) | "Fall Creek Boys Choir" (2011) | "A Case of You" (2011) |

Bon Iver singles chronology
| "Monster" (2010) | "Fall Creek Boys Choir" (2011) | "Holocene" (2011) |

Lyric video
- "Fall Creek Boys Choir" on YouTube

"Fall Creek Boys Choir" is a song by James Blake and Bon Iver, released as the first single from Blake's Enough Thunder EP. The song was premiered on BBC Radio 1 and released on the internet on 24 August 2011, and was released commercially as a single on 29 August 2011. The song makes extensive use of multi-layered vocals, auto-tune and vocoders.

The song's title is a reference to Fall Creek, Wisconsin, where Justin Vernon, Bon Iver's frontman, owns the recording studio April Base Studios. The artwork is a picture of a fox's head carved on wood, which is located in one of the booths of Dave's Fox Head Tavern in Iowa City, Iowa.

== Critical reception ==
Steve Horowitz of PopMatters praised the song and gave it eight out of ten stars, stating "the two work in completely different genres. Blake and dubstep has its roots in urban electronic dance music. Bon Iver’s recordings show an affinity for rural folk traditions and harmony vocalizations that recall the open air of his remote Wisconsin home. But the results are in with a single called "Fall Creek Boys Choir" that sounds like someone welded the two sounds together with a blow torch. That's a compliment. While the Frankenstein-style creation may not resemble the pure music of each other's past, it lives and breathes."

== Track listing ==
| No. | Title | Writer(s) | Producer(s) | Length |
|---|---|---|---|---|
| 1. | "Fall Creek Boys Choir" | James Blake; Justin Vernon | Blake; Vernon | 4:33 |
