= Bon Iver, Bon Iver =

Studio album by Bon Iver
- Released: June 17, 2011
- Recorded: November 2008 – December 2010
- Studios: April Base, Fall Creek, Wisconsin
- Genres: Post-rock; chamber folk; chamber pop; experimental
- Length: 39:25
- Labels: Jagjaguwar (US), 4AD (Europe)
- Producer: Justin Vernon

Bon Iver chronology
Blood Bank (2009)	Bon Iver, Bon Iver (2011)	22, A Million (2016)

Singles from Bon Iver
- 1. "Calgary" Released: June 14, 2011; 2. "Holocene" Released: September 6, 2011; 3. "Towers" Released: March 6, 2012; 4. "Beth/Rest" Released: October 16, 2012

Bon Iver, Bon Iver (/boʊn iːˈvɛər/; also known as Bon Iver) is the second studio album from American indie folk band Bon Iver, released on June 17, 2011. The album is composed of 10 songs and was seen as a new musical direction for the band.

The album debuted at number one on the Norwegian Albums Chart and the Danish Albums Chart, and number two on the US Billboard 200 chart. It sold 104,000 copies in its first week in the United States. As of September 2016, the album has sold a total of 629,000 copies in the United States. It received acclaim from critics, some of whom named it one of the best albums of 2011. The album won the Grammy Award for Best Alternative Music Album at the 2012 ceremony, while the song "Holocene" was nominated for Song of the Year and Record of the Year.

== History ==
Bon Iver's second album was rumored to be titled Letters for Marvin but was later confirmed to be Bon Iver. "I brought in a lot of people to change my voice – not my singing voice, but my role as the author of this band, this project," said Justin Vernon, band leader and founder, who hired well-known players like bass saxophonist Colin Stetson and pedal-steel guitarist Greg Leisz. "I built the record myself, but I allowed those people to come in and change the scene." The second album is described as an "ambitious musical departure" from the first.

The band announced the release through various media and from the official Jagjaguwar and 4AD websites, on April 20, 2011. The album was recorded in a remodeled veterinarian clinic in Fall Creek, Wisconsin, which was bought by Vernon and his brother in 2008. It was converted into April Base Studios, built mainly over the defunct swimming pool attached to the clinic. Vernon's reason for recording in the location was that "[it's] been a wonderful freedom, working in a place we built. It's also only three miles from the house I grew up in, and just ten minutes from the bar where my parents met."

The album's first song "Perth", was the first song that Vernon recorded for the album; "The first thing I worked on, the riff and the beginning melodies, was the first song on the record, 'Perth,'" said Vernon. "That was back in early 2008. The reason I called it that right away, is because I was with a guy that I didn't know very well, but basically, it's a long story, but in the three days we were supposed to spend together — he's a music video maker — in those three days, his best friend (Heath Ledger) died and he was from Perth. It just sort of became the beginning of the record. And Perth has such a feeling of isolation, and also it rhymes with birth, and every song I ended up making after that just sort of drifted towards that theme, tying themselves to places and trying to explain what places are and what places aren't. We were down at my parents' house shooting the video for 'Wolves.'" The director of the video, Matt Amato, happened to be close friends with Heath Ledger. "It was January," Vernon said, "fucking 25 below. We're out shooting, and we come back in, and his phone had been going off." Ledger, it turned out, was dead. "So I've got this guy in my house whose best friend just passed away. He's sobbing in my arms. He can't go back to L.A. because the house is under siege. Michelle Williams is calling my parents' phone. All this stuff." For the next two days, Amato drank brandy, cried and reminisced about Ledger riding horses back home in Perth. The morning he left, Vernon wrote the song's first draft.

The album's third song and second single was described by Vernon as being: "'Holocene' is a bar in Portland, Oregon, but it's also the name of a geologic era, an epoch if you will. It's a good example of how all the songs are all meant to come together as this idea that places are times and people are places and times are… people? They can all be different and the same at the same time. Most of our lives feel like these epochs. That's kind of what that song's about. "Once I knew I was not magnificent." Our lives feel like these epochs, but really we are dust in the wind. But I think there's a significance in that insignificance that I was trying to look at in that song."

On May 17, 2011, a month prior to its scheduled release, the entire album was briefly and accidentally made available for sale on iTunes, resulting in customers buying and leaking the album over torrents and file sharing services. The album entered the UK charts at number 4 in the first week of release.

In November 2011, the album was re-released on iTunes with short films by visual artists Dan Huiting, Isaac Gale, David Jensen, JoLynn Garnes and Justin Vernon himself accompanying each track.

A 10th anniversary edition of the album with Justin Vernon and Sean Carey's October 2011 AIR Studios sessions was released on January 14, 2022, alongside an essay from Phoebe Bridgers on the physical release.

== Composition ==
Vernon has stated that each song on the album represents a place. The song "Perth" was described as a "Civil War-sounding heavy metal song", while the song "Minnesota, WI" was described as featuring "finger-picked guitars, double bass drums and distorted bass saxophone". The closing song "Beth/Rest" is "horn heavy", and Vernon stated he was most proud of it. The album has been characterized as folk rock, indie rock, post-rock and soft rock, as well as chamber pop.

== Artwork ==
This album cover was created by Gregory Euclide.

== Critical reception ==
Professional ratings
Aggregate scores
Source	Rating
AnyDecentMusic?	8.3/10
Metacritic	86/100
Review scores
Source	Rating
AllMusic	2.5/5 stars
The A.V. Club	A−
The Daily Telegraph	4/5 stars
Entertainment Weekly	A−
The Guardian	5/5 stars
The Independent	5/5 stars
NME	7/10
Pitchfork	9.5/10
Rolling Stone	3.5/5 stars
Spin	8/10

The album received acclaim from most music critics upon its release. At Metacritic, which assigns a normalized rating out of 100 to reviews from mainstream critics, the album received an average score of 86, based on 43 reviews, which indicates "universal acclaim". Paste and Pitchfork named the album their top album of 2011, while Stereogum, Q, Uncut, Spin, and Mojo placed it at number 3, 4, 9, 14, and 16 respectively, on their "Top 50 Albums of 2011" lists. Billboard placed it at number 2 on their "Best Albums of 2011" list. The Guardian claimed the album to be the 5th best of 2011, while Rolling Stone placed Bon Iver at number 21 on the list "50 Best Albums of 2011".

Tim Sendra, of AllMusic, however, gave the album a mostly mixed review. The criticism stems mainly from the album's departure in sound from Bon Iver's previous work. He accuses the album of being too overblown due to the additional instruments and not as intimate as For Emma, saying, "He was doing just fine on his own and didn't need all those people and instruments cluttering up the air."

Bon Iver won Best Alternative Music Album at the 2012 Grammy Awards, while the band won Best New Artist for their work on it. Bon Iver was also nominated for Best International Male and Best International Newcomer at the 2012 Brit Awards.

The album was selected as one of the Best Albums of the Decade by Pitchfork.

=== Rankings ===
Select rankings of Bon Iver, Bon Iver
Publication	List	Rank	Ref.
The A.V. Club	The Best Music of 2011	3	
Billboard	10 Best Albums of 2011	2	
BrooklynVegan	141 Best Albums of the 2010s	23	
Complex	The 25 Best Albums of 2011	15	
Consequence	Top 50 Albums of 2011	2	
Consequence	Top 100 Albums of the 2010s	30	
Consequence	Top 75 Albums of the Last 15 Years (2007–2022)	23	
Drowned in Sound	Albums of The Year 2011	12	
NME	Best Albums of 2011	46	
NME	The Best Albums of The Decade: The 2010s	20	
Paste	The 50 Best Albums of 2011	1	
Paste	The 100 Best Albums of the 2010s	28	
Pitchfork	The Top 50 Albums of 2011	1	
Pitchfork	The 100 Best Albums of the Decade So Far (2010–2014)	27	
Pitchfork	The 200 Best Albums of the 2010s	32	
Rolling Stone	50 Best Albums of 2011	21	
Spin	50 Best Albums of 2011	14	
Stereogum	Top 20 Albums Of 2011 So Far	1	
Stereogum	Top 50 Albums Of 2011	3	
Stereogum	The 100 Best Albums Of The 2010s	22	

== Track listing ==
All tracks are written by Justin Vernon, except "Calgary", written by Vernon with Matt McCaughan.

No.	Title	Length
1.	"Perth"	4:22
2.	"Minnesota, WI"	3:52
3.	"Holocene"	5:36
4.	"Towers"	3:08
5.	"Michicant"	3:45
6.	"Hinnom, TX"	2:45
7.	"Wash."	4:58
8.	"Calgary"	4:10
9.	"Lisbon, OH"	1:33
10.	"Beth/Rest"	5:16
Total length:		39:25

Tenth anniversary edition
No.	Title	Length
11.	"Hinnom, TX (AIR Studios – 4AD/Jagjaguwar Session)"	3:46
12.	"Wash. (AIR Studios – 4AD/Jagjaguwar Session)"	5:25
13.	"I Can't Make You Love Me (AIR Studios – 4AD/Jagjaguwar Session)"	4:47
14.	"Babys (AIR Studios – 4AD/Jagjaguwar Session)"	6:14
15.	"Beth/Rest (AIR Studios – 4AD/Jagjaguwar Session)"	6:45

=== B-sides ===
- "I Can't Make You Love Me/Nick of Time" – B-side on the "Calgary" single release.
- "Come Talk to Me" – B-side on the "Holocene" single release.
- "Bruised Orange (Chain of Sorrow)" – B-side on the "Towers" single release.
- "Beth/Rest (Rare Book Room)" – B-side on the "Beth/Rest" single release.

== Personnel ==
Adapted from liner notes.

Performance

- Mike Lewis – tenor saxophone (tracks 2–5, 7), alto saxophone (tracks 2, 4, 5), soprano saxophone (track 3), saxophone (track 10); additional string and horn arrangements
- Colin Stetson – alto saxophone (tracks 1–5), bass saxophone (tracks 1, 2, 4–6), flute (track 2), clarinets (track 3), saxophone (track 10); additional string and horn arrangements
- Mikey Noyce – vocals (tracks 2–4, 6, 7)
- Rob Moose – violins (tracks 1, 2, 4–7), violas (tracks 1, 7); string and horn arrangements
- Justin Vernon – vocals (tracks 1–8, 10), Korg M1 (tracks 2, 4, 5, 8–10), guitars (tracks 1, 3–5), baritone guitar (tracks 2, 3, 6, 8), drums (tracks 1–3), bass (tracks 1, 7, 8), high-strung guitar (tracks 3, 4, 8), cymbals (tracks 1, 3), 909 (tracks 2, 4), RE-201 (tracks 2, 6), CDO choirs (tracks 4, 9), pianos (tracks 6, 7), electric guitars (tracks 8, 10), synth patches (tracks 9, 10), choirs (track 1), banjo (track 2), nylon guitar (track 2), synth (track 3), bass drum (track 5), twelve-string delays (track 5), finger cymbals (track 5), tremolo piano (track 6), hands (track 7), tape head guitars (track 8); additional string and horn arrangements
- Matt McCaughan – drums (tracks 1, 2, 4, 8), RE-201 (tracks 6, 8), snare drums (track 3), brushes (track 3), bass drum (track 3), thighs (track 3), hand claps (track 3), granular synthesis (track 3), synth (track 3), drum source (track 6), gates (track 6), 909 (track 7)
- Tom Wincek – granular synthesis (tracks 6, 7, 9)
- Sean Carey – vocals (tracks 4, 5, 7), drums (tracks 1, 4), choirs (track 2, 7), vibraphone (track 3), bowed vibraphone (track 3), Harmony Engine (track 5), bass drum (track 5), mallet drums (track 7), processing (track 7)
- Greg Leisz – pedal steel (tracks 2, 4, 5, 7, 10)
- Brian Joseph – RE-201 (track 6), gates (track 6)
- Jim Schoenecker – granular synthesis (tracks 6, 7, 9)
- CJ "Carm" Camerieri – French horns (tracks 1, 3, 4, 6, 7), trumpets (tracks 1, 4, 6), pedal trumpets (track 3), muted trumpets (track 5), piccolo trumpet (track 6); additional string and horn arrangements

Production

- Justin Vernon – production, engineering, mixing
- Brian Joseph – engineering, mixing
- Nate Vernon – additional engineering
- Andy Immerman – assistant engineering
- Greg Calbi – mastering

Design

- Gregory Euclide – paintings
- Daniel Murphy – design, layout, handwriting

== Charts ==
=== Weekly charts ===
Chart (2011)	Peak position
Australian Albums (ARIA)	2
Austrian Albums (Ö3 Austria)	34
Belgian Albums (Ultratop Flanders)	4
Belgian Albums (Ultratop Wallonia)	59
Canadian Albums (Billboard)	6
Danish Albums (Hitlisten)	1
Dutch Albums (Album Top 100)	15
Finnish Albums (Suomen virallinen lista)	31
French Albums (SNEP)	54
German Albums (Offizielle Top 100)	26
Irish Albums (IRMA)	3
New Zealand Albums (RMNZ)	5
Norwegian Albums (VG-lista)	1
Scottish Albums (Official Charts)	4
Spanish Albums (Promusicae)	25
Swedish Albums (Sverigetopplistan)	12
Swiss Albums (Schweizer Hitparade)	10
UK Albums (Official Charts)	4
US Billboard 200	2
US Top Alternative Albums (Billboard)	1
US Independent Albums (Billboard)	1
US Top Rock Albums (Billboard)	1

Chart (2022)	Peak position
Belgian Albums (Ultratop Wallonia)	46
German Albums (Offizielle Top 100)	14

=== Year-end charts ===
Chart (2011)	Position
Australian Albums (ARIA)	68
Belgian Albums (Ultratop Flanders)	54
Danish Albums (Hitlisten)	8
UK Albums (OCC)	116
US Billboard 200	100
US Top Rock Albums (Billboard)	13

== Commercial performance ==
As of January 2012 UK sales stand at 120,000 copies according to The Guardian. In October 2011 it was awarded a double gold certification from the Independent Music Companies Association which indicated sales of at least 150,000 copies throughout Europe.

== Certifications ==
Region	Certification	Certified units/sales
Australia (ARIA)	Platinum	70,000^{^}
Canada (Music Canada)	Gold	40,000^{^}
Denmark (IFPI Danmark)	2× Platinum	40,000^{‡}
New Zealand (RMNZ)	Platinum	15,000^{‡}
Sweden (GLF)	Gold	20,000^{‡}
United Kingdom (BPI)	Gold	100,000^{^}
United States (RIAA)	Platinum	1,000,000^{‡}
^{^} Shipments figures based on certification alone.^{‡} Sales+streaming figures based on certification alone.

== Release history ==
Region	Date	Format	Label
Ireland	June 17, 2011	CD, LP, digital download	4AD
United Kingdom	June 20, 2011	CD, LP, digital download	4AD
United States	June 21, 2011	CD, LP, digital download	Jagjaguwar
