= Boys of Faith =

EP by Zach Bryan
- Released: September 22, 2023
- Genre: Folk; Americana
- Length: 15:59
- Label: Belting Bronco; Warner
- Producer: Zach Bryan; Eddie Spear

Zach Bryan chronology
Zach Bryan (2023)	Boys of Faith (2023)	The Great American Bar Scene (2024)

Boys of Faith is the third EP by American singer-songwriter Zach Bryan. It was released on September 22, 2023, through Belting Bronco and Warner, a month after the release of his eponymous fourth studio album. The project features guest appearances from Noah Kahan and Bon Iver—who appear on the tracks "Sarah's Place" and the title track respectively.

== Background and composition ==
On September 17, 2023, weeks after the release of his fourth studio album, Bryan shared clips of songs he recorded with Bon Iver and Noah Kahan. For the recording process, Bryan "locked" himself in the studio for a week, wrote himself "through a notebook" and met with people he loves, before going camping and feeling "restful and hopeful". He closed out the statement by mentioning the EP title "them boys of faith". The project was once again self-written and self-produced by Bryan himself. The release strategy follows a similar pattern to his 2022 releases American Heartbreak and Summertime Blues.

The singer-songwriter enlisted Bon Iver for an "autumnal Americana" title track that features a "tumbling chorus", on top of "hearty voices sprawl over strings, piano and affecting percussion". Bryan had previously shown admiration for their music, including a cover of "Skinny Love" which dates back to 2016. In November 2022, Bryan explained that Bon Iver's Justin Vernon was the reason he "started playing music". "Sarah's Place" features fellow Nashville singer-songwriter Noah Kahan in "an uptempo barnburner that bittersweetly reminisces on a past relationship". Finally, the musician included a previously unreleased fan favorite deep-cut "Deep Satin".

== Track listing ==
All tracks written by Bryan, except where noted; "Deep Satin" co-produced with Eddie Spears.

Boys of Faith track listing
No.	Title	Writer(s)	Length
1.	"Nine Ball"		2:49
2.	"Sarah's Place" (featuring Noah Kahan)	Bryan; Noah Kahan	3:34
3.	"Boys of Faith" (featuring Bon Iver)	Bryan; Bon Iver	2:50
4.	"Deep Satin"		3:31
5.	"Pain, Sweet, Pain"		3:15
Total length:			15:59

== Charts ==
=== Weekly charts ===
Weekly chart performance for Boys of Faith
Chart (2023)	Peak position
Canadian Albums (Billboard)	8
New Zealand Albums (RMNZ)	25
US Billboard 200	8
US Americana/Folk Albums (Billboard)	2
US Top Country Albums (Billboard)	3
US Top Rock Albums (Billboard)	2

=== Year-end charts ===
Year-end chart performance for Boys of Faith
Chart (2024)	Position
US Top Country Albums (Billboard)	39

== Certifications ==
Certifications for Boys of Faith
Region	Certification	Certified units/sales
Canada (Music Canada)	Platinum	80,000^{‡}
New Zealand (RMNZ)	Gold	7,500^{‡}
United States (RIAA)	Gold	500,000^{‡}
^{‡} Sales+streaming figures based on certification alone.
