= Range of Light (album) =

Studio album by S. Carey
- Released: 1 April 2014
- Genre: Ambient, chamber pop, indie folk
- Length: 36:35
- Label: Jagjaguwar

S. Carey chronology
Hoyas (2012)	Range of Light (2014)	Supermoon EP (2015)

Professional ratings
Aggregate scores
Source	Rating
Metacritic	69/100
Review scores
Source	Rating
Pitchfork	7.3/10
Consequence of Sound	C

Range of Light is the second studio album by S. Carey.

== Background ==
S. Carey described the nine tracks found on his latest LP as being inspired by California and Arizona, where he would spend summers as a kid visiting family, hiking, camping, fishing, and engaging in other outdoorsy activities. In turn, the proper follow-up to 2010's All We Grow (S. Carey dropped an EP, dubbed Hoyas, in 2012) was released April 1, 2014, in time for hiking season to kick off.

== Critical reception ==
The album received generally positive reviews, pointing out Carey's attention to detail with his voice and background textures. At Metacritic, which assigns a normalized rating out of 100 to reviews from mainstream critics, the album has an average score of 69 out of 100, which indicates "generally favorable reviews" based on seventeen reviews. Timothy Monger of All Music describes the 2014 LP as him channeling his admiration of John Muir digging deep into California's Sierra mountain range, approaching this project as more of a composer than a songwriter.

== Track listing ==
No.	Title	Length
1.	"Glass/Film"	4:00
2.	"Creaking"	3:44
3.	"Crown the Pines"	3:30
4.	"Fire-Scene"	4:35
5.	"Radiant"	1:45
6.	"Alpenglow"	4:22
7.	"Fleeting Light"	5:00
8.	"The Dome"	4:18
9.	"Neverending Fountain"	5:13
