= Beth/Rest =

2012 single by Bon Iver

Single by Bon Iver

from the album Bon Iver
- Released: October 6, 2012
- Genre: Soft rock
- Length: 5:16
- Label: 4AD; Jagjaguwar
- Songwriter: Justin Vernon

Bon Iver singles chronology
"Towers" (2012)	"Beth/Rest" (2012)	"22 (OVER S∞∞N)" (2016)

Music video
- "Beth/Rest" on YouTube

"Beth/Rest" is a song by Bon Iver. It is the closing track from the 2011 album Bon Iver, and was released as the fourth and final single. The song was written by frontman Justin Vernon, who has stated that it is the song from their eponymous album that he is the proudest of.

== Writing ==
The songwriter, Justin Vernon, said "I've never gone through as much as I went through writing a song as that". He said "Beth/Rest" was an uplifting song about "finding true love" and feeling that nothing would ever be as meaningful again. Most of the sounds were created using a Korg M1 synthesizer.

== Reception ==
The song has polarized critics and listeners. Stephen Thompson of NPR called the song "the year's most divisive song", whereas Jillian Mapes of Billboard named the song as one of the best songs of 2011.

== Music video ==
The music video was directed by Vernon and Dan Huiting, who also directed the video for the album's lead single, "Calgary".

== Track listing ==
All songs written by Justin Vernon.

1. "Beth/Rest" – 5:16
2. "Beth/Rest" (Rare Book Room) – 5:38
