= Charles Goldman (conceptual artist) =

American conceptual artist

- Born: 1966 (age 59–60); San Francisco, California, United States
- Education: University of Illinois Chicago, University of California, Santa Cruz
- Known for: Sculpture, installation art, painting, drawing
- Awards: Guggenheim Fellowship
- Website: cgwk.net

Charles Goldman (born San Francisco, California, 1966) is an American conceptual artist whose work spans sculpture, installation, performance, painting and drawing. His practice involves mundane construction materials, household objects, or studio scraps that are refashioned using self-imposed systems that recontextualize experiences of public and private space and time. Writers have described Goldman's art as "deceptively minimal, mischievously abstract" work offering both "slow-burn conceptual humor" and a practical everyman’s philosophy.

== Education and career ==
Goldman completed a BA in both American Studies and Studio Arts at University of California, Santa Cruz in 1990, and earned an MFA from the University of Illinois Chicago in 1996. In the decade following, he gained recognition for shows at Southern Exposure, White Columns, Hallwalls, Bellevue Arts Museum, and SculptureCenter. He has also created public projects for the Socrates Sculpture Park, Toronto Sculpture Garden, Portland Institute for Contemporary Art, and Art Caucasus (Tbilisi, Georgia). In 2003, the World Financial Center commissioned "Lend Me a Memory", which evoked the losses of the 9/11 attack. His work was included in Burgeoning Geometries: Constructed Abstractions at the Whitney Museum of American Art at Altria (2006-07), and in exhibitions at White Columns and The Drawing Center (2006), Later works were included at the Contemporary Art Center in Atlanta (2008), Harvard’s Carpenter Center for the Visual Arts (2011).

Goldman lives and works in Brooklyn, New York and the Hudson Valley and has been a professor at Parsons School of Design since 2007.

== Work and reception ==
Goldman's art in the late 1990s drew on his experience as a carpenter, making connections between the fine and construction arts, minimalism, modernist architecture and everyday life. His sculpture All of the Walls of My Parents' House (1996) was a six-foot-high, rectangular stack of plasterboard panels of varied length that reconstituted—at scale—the interior walls of his childhood tract home. San Francisco Chronicle critic Kenneth Baker described the massive work as an ostensible reworking of the 1960s stacked minimalism of Joseph Beuys, Richard Serra and Tony Cragg.

Charles Goldman, Scrapwood Sculpture (40 Gallons), 2008. Scrapwood, glue, acrylic paint, plastic buckets.

His Scrapwood installations (1998–9) consisted of sixteen cardboard boxes containing hundreds of small wood scraps that he configured (without glue or nails) into small cities, each specific to the exhibition site and space. Art in America critic Calvin Reid described it as "a delightful, neatly packaged Duchampian joke."

=== Later work ===
RE>CRETE>I>BEAM, 2024. RE>CRETE, a building material made from recycled paper, e-waste and other household waste. Each unit 16 x 16 x 24 in. (40.6 x 40.6 x 61 cm)

Beginning in the 2010s, Goldman developed.Goldman has developed a green building material called RE>CRETE> made from pulped newspapers and junk mail, shredded CDs, DVDs and credit cards, cut-up home electronic wires, dryer lint, and ground-up packing foam. The material is an open source project that can be packaged as architectural modules or dry-mix bags; it is included in the Material ConneXion libraries worldwide. Roberta Smith singled out Goldman's RE>CRETE>BLKS in the Museum of Arts and Design's "NYC Makers: The MAD Biennial" (2014) as one of the projects exemplifying critical thinking about innovation and purpose. His exhibition at the University Art Museum at UMass, Amherst (2016) consisted of two identical geometric RE>CRETE> units that formed open, four-chambered building blocks. Later solo exhibitions include 4X4X4X4 (2017), ECHO (2023) at Birch Contemporary in Toronto, DBLD at 57W57 in New York (2019), and Backward into Light at the Flow Chart Foundation in Hudson, New York (2025). His work was also included in Intentions-Actions-Outcomes at the University of Kentucky Art Museum (2023).

From 2010 to 2020, Goldman ran a space out of his Crown Heights storefront called GRIDSPACE, which presented over 80 solo exhibitions, concerts, screenings, and readings during its existence.

== Awards and public collections ==
Goldman was named a Guggenheim Fellow in 2011 and has received awards from Artists Space (2002) and New York Foundation for the Arts (2016). He has been awarded artist residencies by MacDowell, Civitella Ranieri Foundation, Art Caucasus, and Art Omi. His work belongs to the public collections of the Berkeley Art Museum, Brooklyn Museum of Art, Center for Book Arts, Library of Congress, Museum of Modern Art, New York Public Library, the Whitney Museum, and private and university collections.
