= Holocene (song) =

Single by Bon Iver

from the album Bon Iver
- B-side: "Come Talk to Me"
- Released: September 5, 2011
- Genre: Indie folk; baroque pop
- Length: 5:36
- Label: 4AD; Jagjaguwar
- Songwriter: Justin Vernon

Bon Iver singles chronology
"Fall Creek Boys Choir" (2011)	"Holocene" (2011)	"Towers" (2012)

Music video
- "Holocene" on YouTube

"Holocene" is a song by American indie folk band Bon Iver. It was released as the second single from their album Bon Iver, September 5, 2011. The single is backed with a cover of Peter Gabriel's song "Come Talk to Me" as a B-side, which was previously released as a limited edition song for Record Store Day. The song was named one of the best songs of 2011 by various music publications. It was nominated for Song of the Year and Record of the Year for the 54th Grammy Awards, and is featured in the Cameron Crowe film We Bought a Zoo, Zach Braff's film Wish I Was Here, the 2014 film The Judge, the Dutch film Just Friends (Gewoon Vrienden) in 2018, the 2019 film Give Me Liberty .

Frontman Justin Vernon explained the song title in an interview with Mojo: "It's partly named after the (geological) era, but it's also the name of a bar in Portland where I had a dark night of the soul." He also stated that "the title is a metaphor for when you're not doing well. But it's also a song about redemption and realizing that you're worth something; that you're special and not special at the same time."

Vernon later explained the origin of the song in a conversation with Aaron Rodgers:

It was Christmas night, and my brother and I watched Inglourious Basterds, of all films. You know, it's not like it was a subject matter that was, you know, gonna birth a song like that exactly, but it was—I like watching Tarantino's films because they're so complete. They're just complete creative ideas executed at such a high level, you know. And we had a little smokey-smoke and took a walk down our road, and it was so quiet and it was like a really icy night and it was already quiet 'cause there's not a lot of people traveling, and it was really kind of spooky night. The air's just hanging, and we went and walked over to this bridge over I-94, and there just wasn't a single car. There was nothing for miles and miles, and the air was hanging in such a way with the ice storm kinda going on, and it looked like this sheet of ice on the road and this glow of the distant lights of Eau Claire, and it was just—it really just came out, like at once I knew I was not magnificent, you know, and the highway aisles of ice and all that, and it was one of those moments where you're not really sure if you're the creator of something or not or if you've just been handed something to share. It's easy to stay humble sometimes when, you know, it's like, I've worked hard and everything, but sometimes you just feel like you really are a conduit for describing an idea or something like that, but that's really where all that came from, and the different verses are really about Eau Claire and about my people from there.

Vernon also explained how Wisconsin influenced his perception and songwriting:

There's a lot of humble people around. Growing up in Wisconsin, I never felt like anybody was really trying to prove too much. The winter slows us down enough that, you know, we're not Hollywood. We don't seem to think achievement is the biggest thing. It's family and togetherness and having a beer at The Joynt or whatever. It's more like that, and I've always resonated with it and it's another one of the reasons I can't seem to leave.

== Music video ==
The music video, directed by Nabil Elderkin, was filmed in the region of Vík in Iceland with a Red Camera. It features a blonde Icelandic boy waking up and roaming around the island's volcanic landscape and glaciers, equipped with just a walking stick. Since the lyrics of "Holocene" describe the idea that the self is part of something greater, the music video highlights the expansive landscapes in contrast to the boy. The video was debuted on the National Geographic Channel. In January 2012, music video blog Yes, We've Got a Video! ranked it at number 10 in their top 30 videos of 2011, saying that the video "should serve as proof that the art of the music video is not dead."

== Reception and legacy ==
The song was highly acclaimed by critics. Pitchfork named it as the second best song of 2011, saying "the rising and falling chord changes create a sense of motion that develops throughout the whole song, a tide-like ebb and flow that ends with an abrupt denouement, so swift it withholds almost as much pleasure as it yields." Rolling Stone ranked it as the 22nd best single of 2011, simply stating that "'[Holocene]' takes sensitive-guy poetry somewhere sublime." The song also won 2nd place in Stereogum's annual Gummy Awards. It was nominated for Record of the Year and Song of the Year at the 54th Annual Grammy Awards, but lost both to Adele's "Rolling in the Deep". It was voted 52nd in the 2011 Triple J Hottest 100.

"Holocene" was also included in the book "1001 Songs You Must Hear Before You Die". In 2019, NPR's listeners named "Holocene" as the best song of the 2010s.

== Charts ==
Chart performance for "Holocene"
Chart (2012)	Peak position
Belgium (Ultratip Bubbling Under Flanders)	9
Japan Hot 100 (Billboard)	39
US Bubbling Under Hot 100 (Billboard)	18
US Heatseekers Songs (Billboard)	22
US Rock Digital Songs (Billboard)	19
UK Physical Singles (OCC)	17

== Certifications ==
Certifications for "Holocene"
Region	Certification	Certified units/sales
Denmark (IFPI Danmark)	Platinum	90,000^{‡}
Italy (FIMI)	Gold	25,000^{‡}
New Zealand (RMNZ)	Platinum	30,000^{‡}
United Kingdom (BPI)	Gold	400,000^{‡}
United States (RIAA)	Platinum	1,000,000^{‡}
^{‡} Sales+streaming figures based on certification alone.
