= Bon Iver =

American indie folk band

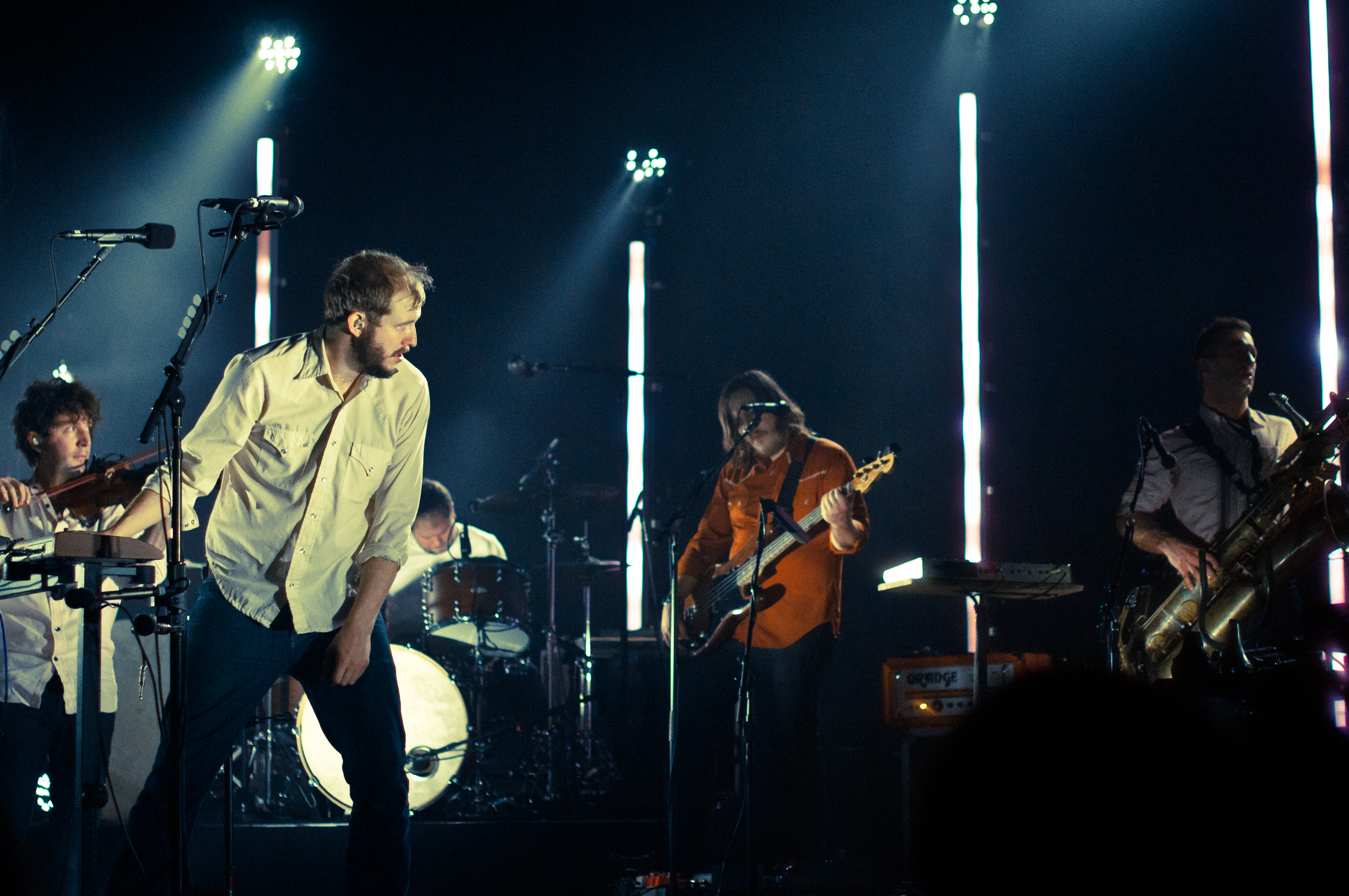
- Bon Iver performing in Stockholm, Sweden in 2011

Background information
- Origin: Eau Claire, Wisconsin, U.S.
- Genres: Indie folk; indie pop; indie rock; experimental pop; soft rock; folktronica
- Years active: 2006–present
- Labels: Jagjaguwar; 4AD
- Members: Justin Vernon; Sean Carey; Matthew McCaughan; Michael Lewis; Andrew Fitzpatrick; Jenn Wasner
- Website: boniver.org

Bon Iver (/ˌboʊn iːˈvɛər/ BONE ee-VAIR) is an American indie folk band founded in 2006 by singer-songwriter Justin Vernon in Eau Claire, Wisconsin. Vernon had originally formed Bon Iver as a solo project, but it eventually became a band consisting of Vernon (vocals, guitar), Sean Carey (drums, keyboards, vocals), Michael Lewis (vocals, baritone guitar, guitar, violin, saxophone), Matthew McCaughan (drums, bass, vocals), Andrew Fitzpatrick (guitar, keyboards, vocals), and Jenn Wasner (guitar, keyboards, vocals).

Vernon released Bon Iver's debut album, For Emma, Forever Ago, independently in July 2007. The majority of the album was recorded while Vernon spent three months isolated in a cabin in western Wisconsin. In 2012, the band won the Grammy Award for Best Alternative Music Album for their eponymous album Bon Iver. They released their third album 22, A Million to critical acclaim in 2016. Their fourth album, I, I, was released in 2019. The album was nominated at the 2020 Grammy Awards for Album of the Year. Their fifth and most recent album, Sable, Fable, was released in 2025.

The name "Bon Iver" derives from the French phrase bon hiver (pronounced [bɔn‿ivɛʁ]; 'good winter'), taken from a greeting on the 1990s TV series Northern Exposure.

== History ==
After the breakup of his band DeYarmond Edison, the ending of a relationship, and a bout of mononucleosis hepatitis, Vernon left Raleigh, North Carolina, and moved back to Wisconsin. He spent the oncoming winter months at his father's cabin in Dunn County, Wisconsin. According to Vernon, it was during this time that the "Bon Iver" moniker first entered his mind; while bedridden with mononucleosis, he began watching the 1990s TV series Northern Exposure on DVD. One episode depicts a group of citizens in Alaska, where the show is set, emerging from their homes into the first snowfall of the winter and wishing one another bon hiver (lit. “good winter”). This was initially transcribed by Vernon as "boniverre"; however, when he learned of its proper French spelling, he elected not to use it, deciding hiver reminded him too much of "liver", the site of his illness at the time.

=== 2006–2010: For Emma, Forever Ago ===
Vernon did not intend to write or record any music during the time but rather to recuperate from the events of the previous year. Eventually, however, a record began to evolve during this cathartic time of isolation. He had recently finished helping the band The Rosebuds do some recording and had with him some basic recording gear when he made his move to the cabin in late 2006. Vernon played all the instruments during recording and each song was heavily edited with a large number of overdubs. Vernon wrote the lyrics for the album by recording a word-less melody and listening to the recording over and over while writing words according to the sound of the syllables of the melody. In an interview, Vernon said, "Words like 'decision' and 'intention' aren't words that float in my head because I just went." Vernon explains, "I left North Carolina and went up there because I didn't know where else to go and I knew that I wanted to be alone and I knew that I wanted to be where it was cold." In another interview, Vernon describes what he used to record the album: "I had a very light set-up, a basic small recording set-up: a Shure SM57 and an old Silvertone guitar. I had my brother drop off his old drums ... some other small things—things I would make or find lying around."

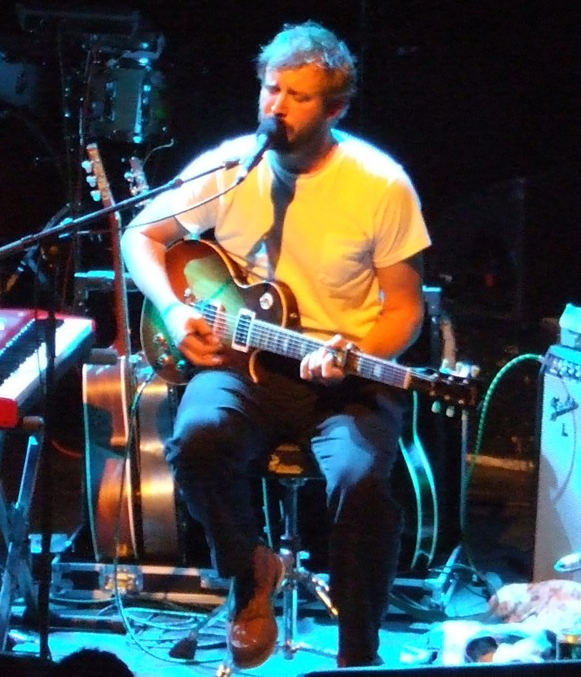
Vernon performing with Bon Iver in Shepherd's Bush, London, UK in 2008

The record was almost not released and was originally intended as a group of demos to be sent out to labels and potentially rerecorded. But after getting very encouraging reactions from a number of his friends, Vernon decided to release the songs himself in their present state. According to his manager Kyle Frenette, an initial run of 500 CDs were pressed. The original CD release show took place at the House of Rock in Eau Claire, Wisconsin. Justin played an earlier "all-ages" show and an evening 21+ show to release the original pressing of the album in its card stock CD case. Of the 500 copies issued, 17 were sent to press, mainly blogs. The first significant attention the album received was from My Old Kentucky Blog in June 2007, after which point "it snowballed," according to manager Frenette. Another further breakthrough came when, in October 2007, the album received a very positive review from influential indie internet publication Pitchfork. That exposure in turn led to a performance the same month at the industry showcase festival CMJ Music Marathon. The appearance attracted much label interest and Frenette later told HitQuarters that they subsequently spoke to various record companies, both independent and major. Out of all of them they decided to sign with the indie Jagjaguwar because their ideals most resembled their own. The signing was confirmed on October 29, 2007.

For Emma, Forever Ago was given an official release by Jagjaguwar. Vernon has said that he will continue to make albums without engineers and producers because he is capable of doing it all himself. Since being released by Jagjaguwar on February 19, 2008, For Emma, Forever Ago has garnered critical acclaim. The album was released in the UK and Europe by iconic indie label 4AD on May 12, 2008. When released in the UK, For Emma, Forever Ago received 5/5 and "Album of the Month" reviews in both Mojo and Uncut magazines. It was the seventh highest rated album of 2008 on review aggregator site Metacritic, with accolades from publications including The Village Voice, The Hartford Courant and The A.V. Club. Pitchfork gave the album 29th place in its "The Top 200 Albums of 2000s" list, while Stereogum placed the album at 11 on its "Best Album of the '00s" list.

The digital download track "Skinny Love" was selected to be iTunes (UK) single of the week and was available for free during that time, as well as being featured as the track of the day on National Public Radio. Bon Iver was ranked number 8 on Last.fm's most-listened-to new music of 2008. Bon Iver's For Emma, Forever Ago was ranked number 29 in Rolling Stone's list of the Top 50 Albums of 2008, and was also ranked number 92 on their list of the 100 Best Albums of the 2000s. In an interview, Vernon said: "I'm really humbled by everything and am keeping things in perspective." On May 19, 2008, "Blindsided" and "Flume" were featured in The CW series One Tree Hill. On October 6, 2008, "Skinny Love" was featured in the NBC series Chuck (season 2, episode 3). 'Blindsided' also featured in 'Stairway To Heaven', the 12th episode of the 5th season of ABC's medical drama Grey's Anatomy.

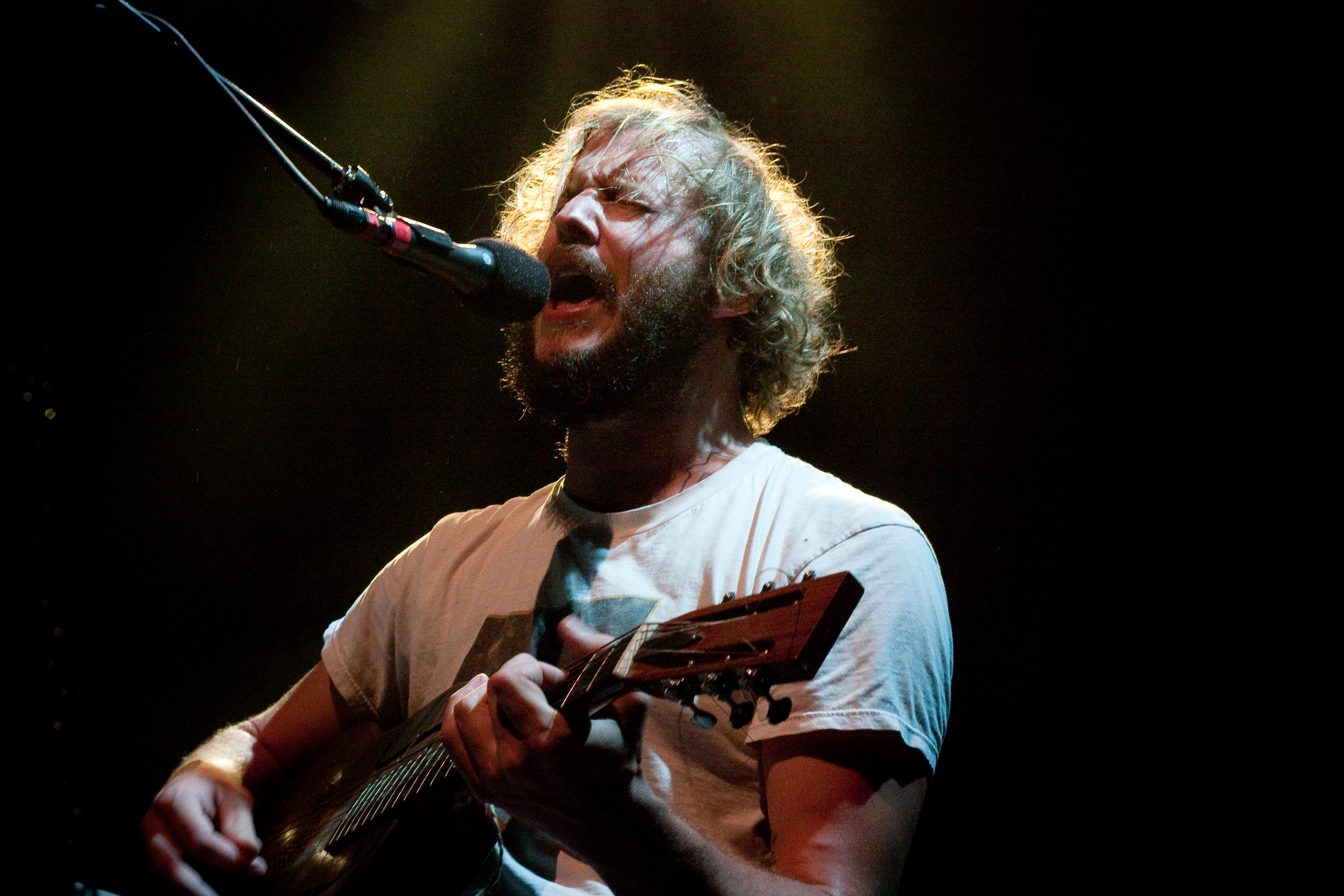
Vernon performing with Bon Iver in 2009

On December 11, 2008, Bon Iver performed "Skinny Love" on the Late Show with David Letterman. On January 26, 2009, "Skinny Love" was announced at No. 21 by the Australian national radio station Triple J in the annual Hottest 100 countdown of the previous year's best songs. In July 2009, "Skinny Love" was announced at No. 92 in Triple J's Hottest 100 of All Time countdown. Additionally, the track "Flume" has been used by the BBC to advertise their Jimmy McGovern-penned drama series The Street; the track "Blood Bank" (off the EP of the same name) was used in a 2009 episode of the NBC series Chuck (season 2, episode 18) and the track "Creature Fear" was used in another Chuck episode (season 2, episode 21); "Skinny Love" was featured in another episode of Chuck (season 2, episode 3), as well as in the ABC drama Grey's Anatomy; "The Wolves (Act I and II)" was used in the first season of United States of Tara, the film The Place Beyond the Pines as well as in the final scenes of the film Rust and Bone; "Re:Stacks" was featured in the Fox drama House, as was "Flume" on May 16, 2011; "Re:Stacks" was also used for the closing sequence of the Silent Witness episode Death Has No Dominion, and "Woods" was used in the eighth episode of Skins' third series and appeared on the series 3 soundtrack.

In 2008, Bon Iver designed a T-shirt for the Yellow Bird Project, with all profits benefiting the Interval House women's shelter in Toronto, Ontario. In October 2009, Bon Iver first appeared on the cover of the publication The Fader, in its 64th issue. Also in 2009, Bon Iver, along with St. Vincent, contributed the song "Roslyn" to the New Moon soundtrack. Bon Iver also contributed "Brackett, WI" to the AIDS benefit album Dark Was the Night produced by the Red Hot Organization.

In 2010, Bon Iver collaborated with Kanye West on the track "Lost in the World", which begins with a sample of the Bon Iver track "Woods". Vernon also contributed vocals to the West tracks "Monster" and "Dark Fantasy", both featured on West's album My Beautiful Dark Twisted Fantasy. Then, in March 2011, Justin Vernon performed at SXSW with GOOD Music. This collaboration publicized him to a wider audience.

=== 2011–2012: Bon Iver, Bon Iver ===
Bon Iver, Bon Iver was released on June 17, 2011. On March 23, 2011, Justin Vernon told Rolling Stone that a follow-up of For Emma, Forever Ago would be released in December 2011. The album is composed of 10 songs and takes a new musical direction: "I brought in a lot of people to change my voice—not my singing voice, but my role as the author of this band, this project," says Vernon, who hired well-known players like bass saxophonist Colin Stetson and pedal-steel guitarist Greg Leisz. "I built the record myself, but I allowed those people to come in and change the scene." The second album is described as an "ambitious musical departure" from the first. Prior to the album's release, Vernon said that each song on the new album represents a place. The song "Perth" was described as a "Civil War-sounding heavy metal song," the song "Minnesota, WI" was described as featuring "finger-picked guitars, double bass drums and distorted bass saxophone," and the closing song "Beth/Rest" would be "horn heavy."

The album was recorded in a remodeled veterinarian clinic in Fall Creek, Wisconsin, which was bought by Vernon and his brother in 2008. It was converted into April Base Studios, built mainly over the defunct swimming pool attached to the clinic. Vernon's reason for recording in the location was that "[it's] been a wonderful freedom, working in a place we built. It's also only three miles from the house I grew up in, and just ten minutes from the bar where my parents met."

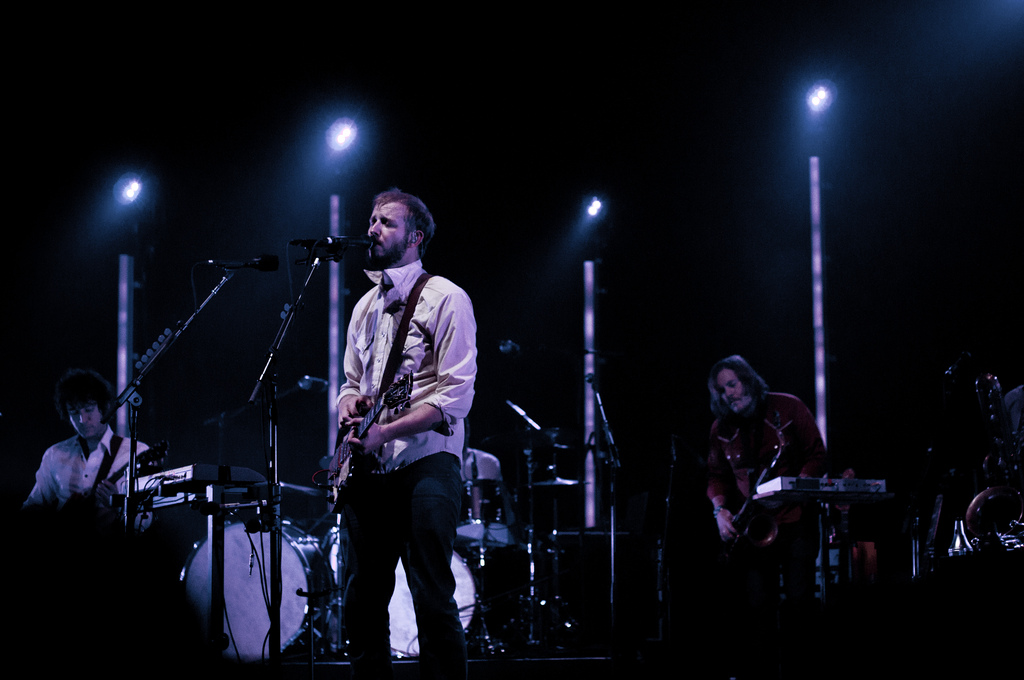
Bon Iver performing in 2011

On April 20, Bon Iver announced details of the release through the official Jagjaguwar and 4AD websites. The artwork for the album was also released, painted by the American artist Gregory Euclide. Gregory also released two YouTube videos entitled the Making of Bon Iver Album Art. Over one month before the album release date, the album was accidentally made available for purchase on the iTunes Music Store on May 23. Apple removed the item from the store, but not before a handful of users were able to purchase and download it. There was no comment from Apple, the artist, or his label. However, the lyrics to the album were promptly uploaded to their record site.

Josh Jackson reviewed Bon Iver for Paste, saying, "It retains the beautiful melancholy of For Emma, but in nearly every way, it's just more. More layered, more diverse, more interesting. He brings in collaborators to do what they do best, but never at the expense of his sound and vision. It treads into new sonic directions without getting lost." He gave the album a score of nine out of ten. In an unfavorable review, Tim Sendra of AllMusic wrote, "[Vernon's] style comes off more like sub-Enya with a beard than a true studio wizard... For Emma, Pt. 2 would have been far more satisfying than this overblown debacle."

In late August 2011, English post-dubstep musician and singer-songwriter James Blake uploaded a track called "Fall Creek Boys Choir", a collaboration with Bon Iver, to his YouTube channel. It was released as the first single from Blake's EP Enough Thunder and was also included on the deluxe edition of his self-titled debut album.

On November 30, 2011, the band earned four nominations for the 54th Grammy Awards: Best New Artist, Best Alternative Music Album for their album Bon Iver, and both Song of the Year and Record of the Year for "Holocene". On December 15, 2011, Pitchfork awarded Bon Iver the number one album of 2011. On February 12, 2012, Bon Iver won the Grammy for Best New Artist. Bon Iver also won the Grammy for Best Alternative Album for Bon Iver, beating out Radiohead, Death Cab for Cutie, Foster the People and My Morning Jacket. On February 15, a five-song studio session was released on YouTube, featuring Justin Vernon and Bon Iver drummer Sean Carey performing piano renditions of the tracks. The recording took place at AIR Studio-owned Lyndurst Hall in London, England.

=== 2012–2018: Hiatus, Wish I Was Here, and 22, A Million ===
During the last performance of their 2012 tour in Dublin's The O2, Vernon announced that it was their last performance as a band, "... at least for a while..." At the time, these two events provoked speculation about whether this was a definite end to the band or simply a hiatus. A representative for Bon Iver's label, Jagjaguwar, issued the statement, "They are just going off cycle after two very busy years on this record."

On November 12, 2012, the band announced its intent to take a break from performing after the last event of its 2012 tour in Dublin. Their label asserted that the band had not broken up.

On June 30, 2014, the band released a new song titled "Heavenly Father", which was featured on the soundtrack of Zach Braff's film Wish I Was Here. Bon Iver's song "Woods" was featured in the Bluecoats 2015 program Kinetic Noise, which was awarded a bronze medal at the Drum Corps International World Championships. On July 18, 2015, the band played their first show in almost three years at the Eaux Claires Music Festival in Eau Claire where they debuted two new songs, "666 ʇ" and "89". Originally, both were slated to be on their next album, but only "666 ʇ" made it to the finished record. Unreleased track "89" has been played occasionally since, soon becoming a fan favorite. On November 18, 2015, the band announced a tour of Asia starting early 2016.

On July 22, 2016, a 22-second live stream was broadcast on the band's official Facebook page, accompanied by the caption '#22days'. A short clip of previously unreleased music could be heard in the video, accompanied by an updated profile and cover photo. On August 17, 2016, the band announced that their next album's title would be 22, A Million. They also provided a track list of 10 songs and released lyric videos for two songs: "22 (OVER S∞∞N)" and "10 dEATh bREasT". On August 29, 2016, the band released their lyric video for "33 "GOD"", the third single from the album.

22, A Million was released on September 30, 2016. It was noted by many as a large stylistic shift for the band. One aspect of this shift included a drastic change in instrumentation; on 22, A Million and subsequent releases, Bon Iver often collaborated with a group of saxophonists known as Sad Sax of Shit. In Pitchfork's review of the album, the publication likened it to Radiohead's Kid A, saying, "Bon Iver's first album in five years takes an unexpected turn toward the strange and experimental. But behind the arranged glitches and processed voices are deeply felt songs about uncertainty."

=== 2018–2023: Come Through shows and I, I ===
In mid 2018, Bon Iver partnered with TU Dance for Come Through, a series of shows featuring a group of contemporary dancers and during which several new songs were premiered. In late 2018, during an Instagram Live session, frontman Justin Vernon revealed a folder named "BI LP4", containing 13 new songs. He also revealed a snippet of the song "We Maddie Parry" (later shortened to "We").

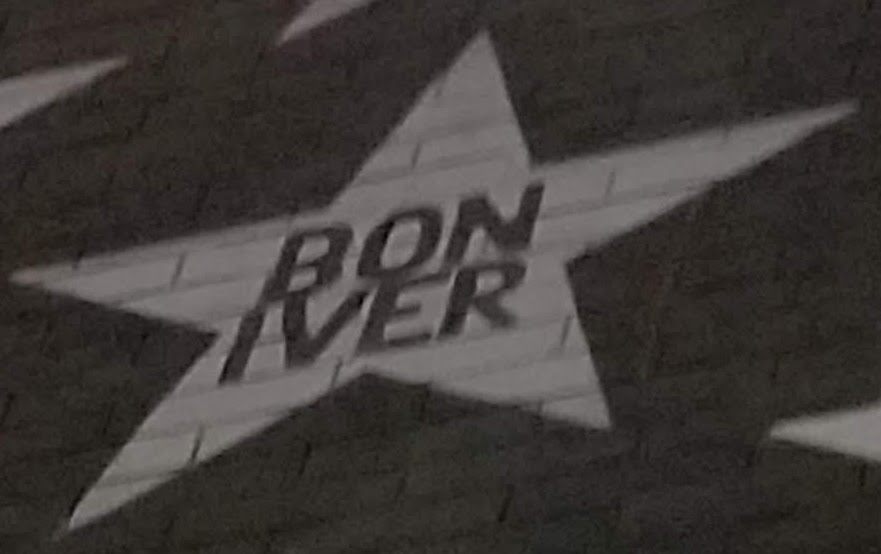
Bon Iver's star on the outside mural of Minneapolis nightclub First Avenue

The band has been honored with a star on the outside mural of the Minneapolis nightclub First Avenue, recognizing performers that have played sold-out shows or have otherwise demonstrated a major contribution to the culture at the iconic venue. Receiving a star "might be the most prestigious public honor an artist can receive in Minneapolis," according to journalist Steve Marsh.

Bon Iver recorded their fourth album in Texas during February and March 2019. On June 2, 2019, Bon Iver debuted two new songs from the upcoming album at All Points East, a more polished version of the previously played "Hey, Ma" and the new song "U (Man Like)" (which was on the setlist Vernon showed in December and which features guest vocals from American singer-songwriter Moses Sumney, Bruce Hornsby, Elsa Jensen, Jenn Wasner, and the Brooklyn Youth Chorus). At the end of the same concert, Bon Iver advertised the website iCOMMAi, featuring similar cryptic messages as their recent lyric videos. The next day, both songs were released as singles alongside a list of fall tour dates. On July 2, the band released a teaser called "Sincerity is Forever in Season", voiced by Michael Perry and relating every album by the band to a season, with the then-upcoming fourth album being autumn.

A week later, on July 11, the band announced that their forthcoming album, I, I (stylized as i,i), would be released on August 30, 2019. They also released the songs "Jelmore" and "Faith" as the third and fourth singles for the album, respectively. On July 31, the band released a documentary short called Bon Iver: Autumn, featuring Vernon and bandmates discussing the I, I album and the upcoming Autumn tour. On August 7, Bon Iver held free worldwide listening parties to preview the new album at over 60 locations around the world. On August 8, starting at 6:00 am EST, the band began to release the previously unreleased album tracks one at a time, every hour on the hour, until 11:00 am EST. The album as a whole was then released on several streaming services, 22 days before it was slated to be officially released. In September 2019, dates for Asian and European tours in 2020 were released.

During promotion of i,i Vernon revealed that he saw Bon Iver’s four primary albums as representative of the four seasons.

On January 21, 2020, the band announced a reissue of their first EP "Blood Bank", which contains new artwork by the usual collaborator Eric Timothy Carlson as well as both original songs and live versions of each one of them. It was released on March 27. On April 4, 2020, Justin Vernon premiered a new Bon Iver song, "Things Behind Things Behind Things" in "Where We Go From Here", a special event from Bernie Sanders. On April 17, Bon Iver released a brand new song called "PDLIF" (Please Don't Live In Fear), which 100% of the proceeds will go to Direct Relief, a company providing resources during the COVID-19 pandemic. The song was later sampled by Baby Keem and Kendrick Lamar for their song "The Hillbillies".

On July 23, American singer-songwriter Taylor Swift announced that Bon Iver would feature on "Exile" (stylized in all lowercase), the second single from her eighth studio album, Folklore. The song became Bon Iver's first top-ten hit on the Billboard Hot 100. On August 5, Bon Iver released "AUATC" (Ate Up All Their Cake) featuring Elsa Jensen, Jenny Lewis, Bruce Springsteen, and Jenn Wasner. The song was accompanied by a press release critiquing capitalism. Swift then announced Evermore, a surprise follow-up album to Folklore on December 10, 2020, which also features Bon Iver on the title track. The band recorded the song "Second Nature" for the 2021 film Don't Look Up.

Bon Iver collaborated with American country star Zach Bryan on the title track "Boys of Faith" off Bryan's Boys of Faith EP. The single charted on the Billboard Hot 100 at a peak of number 26.

On July 28, 2023, Bon Iver member Justin Vernon collaborated with American rap star Travis Scott on the tracks "My Eyes" and "Delresto (Echoes)". The tracks charted on the Billboard Hot 100 at peaks of 19 and 25 respectively

Bon Iver's song "___45____" was featured in the Bluecoats 2023 program, The Garden of Love, which was awarded a silver medal at the 2023 Drum Corps International World Championships.

=== 2024–present: SABLE, fABLE ===
In September 2024, after years of touring in support of their previous album, Bon Iver returned with the single "Speyside", and announced a three-song EP, called Sable, which was released on October 18. The EP marked a return to the project's roots, relying heavily on Vernon's voice and guitar, akin to their debut album, and consists of three songs recorded between 2020 and 2023. The EP was produced by Vernon and Jim-E Stack, with the three songs grouped together as a deliberate "triptych" which "runs the gamut from accepting anxiety to accepting guilt to accepting hope." All three songs are accompanied by black and white music videos featuring Vernon, and directed by Erinn Springer.

Regarding the EP's return to a stripped-back indie folk sound, Vernon noted: "From For Emma until i,i it felt like it was an arc, or an expansion — from One to All. I,I was very much me trying to talk about the We — the Us, outside of I. And when I got to these songs, the obvious thing was, well, people might think this is a return to something. But it really feels like a kind of raw second skin. I think about time in cylindrical, forward-moving circles. This feels like a new person, new skin. A new everything, more than a return. But I did feel like it was important to strip it down to just the bare essentials and get out of the way, to not hide with swaths of choirs. Just get it as close to the human ear as possible."

On February 11, 2025, Vernon revealed that the Sable EP, would be incorporated into a full-length studio album titled, Sable, Fable, which was released on April 11, 2025. The album was announced with the following statement: "SABLE, was the prologue, a controlled burn clearing the way for new possibilities. fABLE is the book. Stories of introduction and celebration. The fresh growth that blankets the charred ground. Where SABLE, was a work of solitude, fABLE is an outstretched hand."

On February 23, 2026, Bon Iver announced Volumes, a series of archival releases starting with an anthology of live recordings. The first release, Volumes: One (Selections From Music Concerts 2019–2023 Bon Iver 6 Piece Band), will be released on April 3, 2026, on Jagjaguwar. In advance, a live version of "Heavenly Father" recorded at Mediolanum in Milan, Italy in 2022 was released. The six-piece band includes Vernon, Andrew Fitzpatrick, Jenn Wasner, Matthew McCaughan, Michael Lewis, and Sean Carey.

== Live performances ==
In live performances, Justin Vernon is joined by Sean Carey (drums, vocals, piano), Michael Noyce (vocals, baritone guitar, guitar, violin) and Matthew McCaughan (bass, drums, vocals). Noyce was Vernon's guitar student during high school. Vernon uses various keyboard instruments during live performances including synthesisers such as a Dave Smith Instruments Prophet 6 and a Teenage Engineering OP-1, while during studio recordings his instruments have included a Steinway & Sons Model D Concert Grand Piano.

Carey approached Vernon during one of the first Bon Iver shows, telling him he could play and sing all the songs. Thereafter, the two played a number of songs together. McCaughan and Vernon met while on tour with indie rock band The Rosebuds in May 2007.

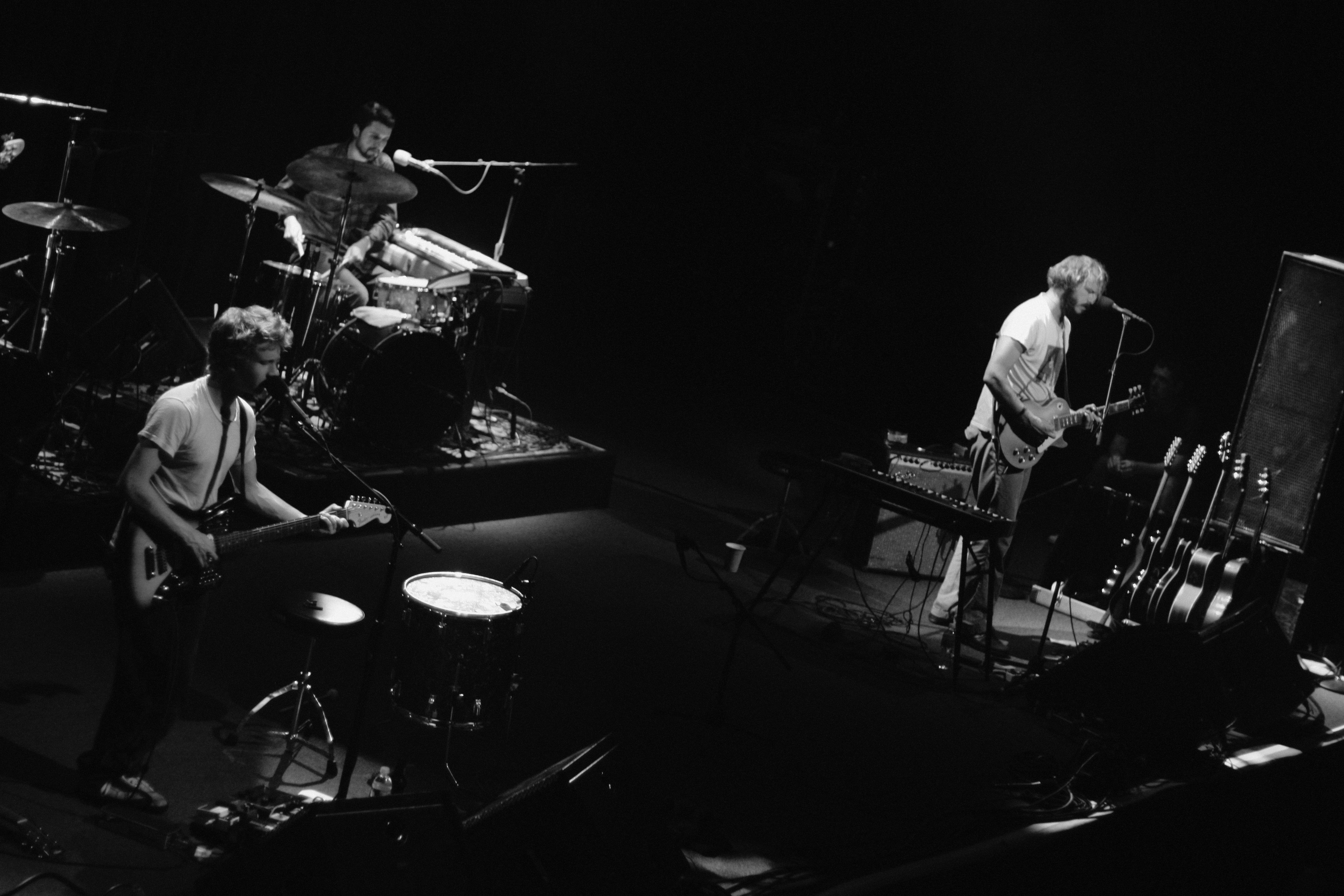
From left to right: Noyce, Carey, and Vernon performing at The Fillmore in 2009

Because of the extensive use of vocal harmony on the songs of For Emma, Forever Ago, Vernon was concerned that there would not be enough voices to duplicate the sound of the songs on the album in a live setting. To compensate for this problem in early performances, Vernon passed out lyrics for some songs to the audience to sing along to. In an interview with Pitchfork, Vernon described this dilemma. "I don't want to be the guy with an acoustic guitar singing songs, because that's boring for the most part. The song actually needs 80–500 people singing or whatever the vibe is of that room, it needs that fight."

Bon Iver performed at Lollapalooza 2009. Bon Iver has also performed at Austin City Limits Music Festival, Glastonbury, Coachella, Øyafestivalen, Way Out West, Bonnaroo, Sasquatch! and All Points East among others.

After the release of Bon Iver's second album, the live performances underwent a great deal of change. With older performances consisting of Vernon playing guitar, while Noyce, Carey, and McCaughan performed on varied instruments, the concerts following Bon Iver involved a much larger, full band. The new lineup consisted of the original four musicians, and included Rob Moose on violin and guitar (Antony and the Johnsons, The National), Mike Lewis on bass (Andrew Bird, Happy Apple), and a horn section including Reginald Pace, Colin Stetson (Tom Waits, Arcade Fire) and C.J. Camerieri (Rufus Wainwright, Sufjan Stevens) as well. On February 2, 2012 Sasquatch! announced Bon Iver as a headliner for their 2012 festival.

Bon Iver appeared as the musical guest on Saturday Night Live on February 4, 2012, where they performed their songs "Holocene" and "Beth/Rest."

During Bon Iver's Asia tour in late February to early March 2016—the first tour since 2012—the live band still consisted of Vernon, Carey, McCaughan and Lewis, in addition to frequent Vernon collaborator Andrew Fitzpatrick (All Tiny Creatures, Volcano Choir) on guitar, synths and vocals; and sisters Emily, Jessica and Camilla Staveley-Taylor, also known as the folk vocal trio The Staves, whose album If I Was was produced by Vernon.

Bon Iver endorsed Kamala Harris in the 2024 US election, and performed at a rally in Eau Claire for Democratic candidates Kamala Harris and Tim Walz on August 7, 2024.

== Mini-documentary ==
Bon Iver: Autumn is a 12-minute film directed by Andrew Swant, documenting the preparation for Bon Iver's 2019 North American tour to support their fourth album, I, I. The film focuses on Justin Vernon discussing the production of the upcoming live shows, the desire to maintain an intimate feeling despite the fact that they will be playing in larger, arena-sized venues. It previews the motion-tracking technology used in the light show, and the immersive three-dimensional sound design planning.

== Band members ==
=== Current line-up ===
- Justin Vernon – vocals, keyboards, guitar (2006–present)
- Sean Carey – drums, keyboards, vocals (2007–present)
- Matthew McCaughan – drums, vocals (2007–present)
- Mike Lewis – vocals, saxophone, bass, keyboards (2011–present)
- Andrew Fitzpatrick – guitar, keyboards, samplers, vocals (2015–present)
- Jenn Wasner – guitar, keyboards, vocals (2019–present)

=== Previous touring musicians ===
- CJ Camerieri – brass, keyboards, vocals
- Rob Moose – violin, guitar, vocals
- Colin Stetson – saxophone, vocals
- Reggie Pace – brass, percussion, vocals
- Mike Noyce - guitar, vocals

== Discography ==
- For Emma, Forever Ago (2007)
- Bon Iver, Bon Iver (2011)
- 22, A Million (2016)
- I, I (2019)
- Sable, Fable (2025)

== Awards ==
Bon Iver awards and nominations
Awards and nominations
Award	Wins	Nominations
Grammy	2	9
Brit Awards	0	3
MTV Video Music Awards Japan	0	1

Totals (Note: Certain award groups do not simply award one winner. They acknowledge several different recipients, have runners-up, and have third place. Since this is a specific recognition and is different from losing an award, runner-up mentions are considered wins in this award tally. For simplification and to avoid errors, each award in this list has been presumed to have had a prior nomination.)
- Wins: 5
- Nominations: 17

AMFT Awards

Year	Nominee / work	Award	Result	Ref.
2016	22, A Million	Best Folk Album	Won	
2016	"22 (OVER S∞∞N)"	Best Folk Song	Won	
2016	"22 (OVER S∞∞N)"	Best Folk Performance	Won	

Grammy Awards

Year	Nominee / work	Award	Result
2012	"Holocene"	Record of the Year	Nominated
2012	"Holocene"	Song of the Year	Nominated
2012	Bon Iver	Best New Artist	Won
2012	Bon Iver, Bon Iver	Best Alternative Music Album	Won
2017	22, A Million	Best Alternative Music Album	Nominated
2020	I, I	Best Alternative Music Album	Nominated
2020	I, I	Album of the Year	Nominated
2020	"Hey, Ma"	Record of the Year	Nominated
2021	"Exile"	Best Pop Duo/Group Performance	Nominated
2022	evermore	Album of the Year	Nominated
2026	Sable, Fable	Best Alternative Music Album	Nominated
2026	"Everything Is Peaceful Love"	Best Alternative Music Performance	Nominated

Brit Awards

Year	Nominee / work	Award	Result
2012	Bon Iver	International Breakthrough Act	Nominated
2012	Bon Iver	International Male Solo Artist	Nominated
2017	Bon Iver	International Male Solo Artist	Nominated

MTV Video Music Awards Japan

Year	Nominee / work	Award	Result
2012	"Holocene"	Best Rock Video	Nominated
