= Music of Wisconsin =

The U.S. state of Wisconsin was settled largely by European immigrants in the late 19th century. This immigration led to the popularization of galops, schottisches, waltzes, and, especially, polkas. Classical composers and conductors from Wisconsin include Hans Balatka, Hugo Kaun, Eugene Luening, and Theodore Steinmetz. Among Wisconsin's contributions to rock music is Les Paul, an electric guitar pioneer known as the "Wizard of Waukesha". The Steve Miller Band, with Milwaukee's Steve Miller, had three #1 hits on the Billboard Hot 100 from 1973 to 1982. The Chordettes from Sheboygan, Al Jarreau from Milwaukee, Bon Iver from Eau Claire, and Garbage from Madison all had albums on the Billboard 200.

== Genres ==
=== German- and Norwegian-American music ===
The 1830s and 1840s brought European dances like the schottische, waltz, galop and, most importantly, the polka. The 1840s also saw massive immigration from Germany to Milwaukee, which became known as Deutsche Athen (German Athens). Groups formed, such as the Milwaukee Musical Society, to celebrate ethnic German music. Some important figures from this era include Christopher Bach, Hans Balatka, Eugene Luening and Hugo Kaun.

While Germans moved to Milwaukee and eastern Wisconsin, Norwegians moved en masse to southern and western Wisconsin, and surrounding areas. Norwegian musicians, such as the violinist Ole Bull, were popular in Madison.

New Glarus and Monroe saw a host of Swiss immigrants settle in the mid-1800s. Much like their German counterparts, these Swiss people established polka societies, many of which are still active today.

=== Blues and jazz ===
Musical output came from Grafton, Ozaukee County during the 1920s when Paramount Records released a series of blues and jazz recordings by artists from the South.

Waukesha's Les Paul, enjoyed a long career as a blues, country, and jazz guitarist and musical innovator. known as the "Wizard of Waukesha" for his technological tinkering, was one of the pioneers of the solid-body electric guitar, helping to create the Gibson Les Paul and later the Gibson SG. Among the musicians he partnered with were his wife Mary Ford, with whom he recorded a version of How High the Moon in 1951. He also played with Jim Atkins, Nat King Cole, Bing Crosby and the Andrews Sisters.

Drummer Viola Smith, from Mount Calvary, is best known for her work in swing bands and orchestras in the 1930-1940s. She appeared on Broadway, film, and television, including The Ed Sullivan Show on multiple occasions.

Jazz clarinetist, alto and soprano saxophonist, singer, and big band leader Woody Herman was born in Milwaukee.

Karen Borca, born in Green Bay, is an avant-garde jazz and free jazz bassoonist who studied music at the University of Wisconsin.

Pianist, composer, and bandleader Lynne Arriale was born in Milwaukee.

=== Punk rock, emo, and pop rock ===
A cult favorite from the 1980s was the Violent Femmes from Milwaukee. Boris the Sprinkler was from Green Bay. New wave bands from Milwaukee included Couch Flambeau and The Stellas, later better known as hardcore punk band Die Kreuzen, who started in Rockford, Illinois, before relocating to Milwaukee. Madison spawned the Tar Babies. Later, the noise rock band Killdozer became an indie rock group. Other notable punk rock bands from Wisconsin are Tenement, The Smerves, Arms Aloft, Avenues, Direct Hit, Mindlisp, and Masked Intruder.

=== Heavy metal ===
Since the late 1990s, Wisconsin has had an upsurge in heavy and extreme metal bands that have played across the state, often extending into the surrounding Midwest. Luna Mortis from Madison was signed by Century Media Records, Lazarus A.D. from Kenosha was signed by Metal Blade, Jungle Rot from Kenosha is currently signed to Napalm Records, and Product of Hate from Kenosha signed to Napalm Records.

Madison has a vibrant stoner rock culture, producing bands such as Bongzilla.

=== Indie ===
Bon Iver from Eau Claire and Cory Chisel are from Appleton.

Slow Pulp from Madison, Wisconsin, currently based in Chicago, Illinois.

=== Hip hop ===
Well-known hip hop artists from Wisconsin include Coo Coo Cal, IshDARR, Kinto Sol, and Streetz-n-Young Deuces.

=== Electronic music ===
Haywyre resides in Milwaukee.

=== Folk music ===
Lou and Peter Berryman reside in Madison.

=== Pop music ===
Singer and songwriter Ava Max is from Milwaukee. Her Albanian-born parents immigrated to the state after being given passports by a Wisconsin resident. She has performed at Milwaukee's Summerfest several times.

== Locales ==
=== Appleton ===
In 2013, this city hosted the first annual Mile of Music festival, a handcrafted artisan festival featuring among other genres, Americana and folk rock music. The festival draws in tens of thousands of people over four-days and features over 200 artists and 800 performances, encompassing over 60 venues and stretching over a mile of downtown Appleton's College Avenue. This festival is a "cover free" zone, meaning no cover songs and no cover charges. This is almost a 100% free festival. The city itself has welcomed artists from all over the country and is fast becoming a hot spot for singer/songwriter and folk music.

Appleton also has many summer concert series that go on all through the summer months, including those in its city parks and Houdini Plaza.

=== Eau Claire ===
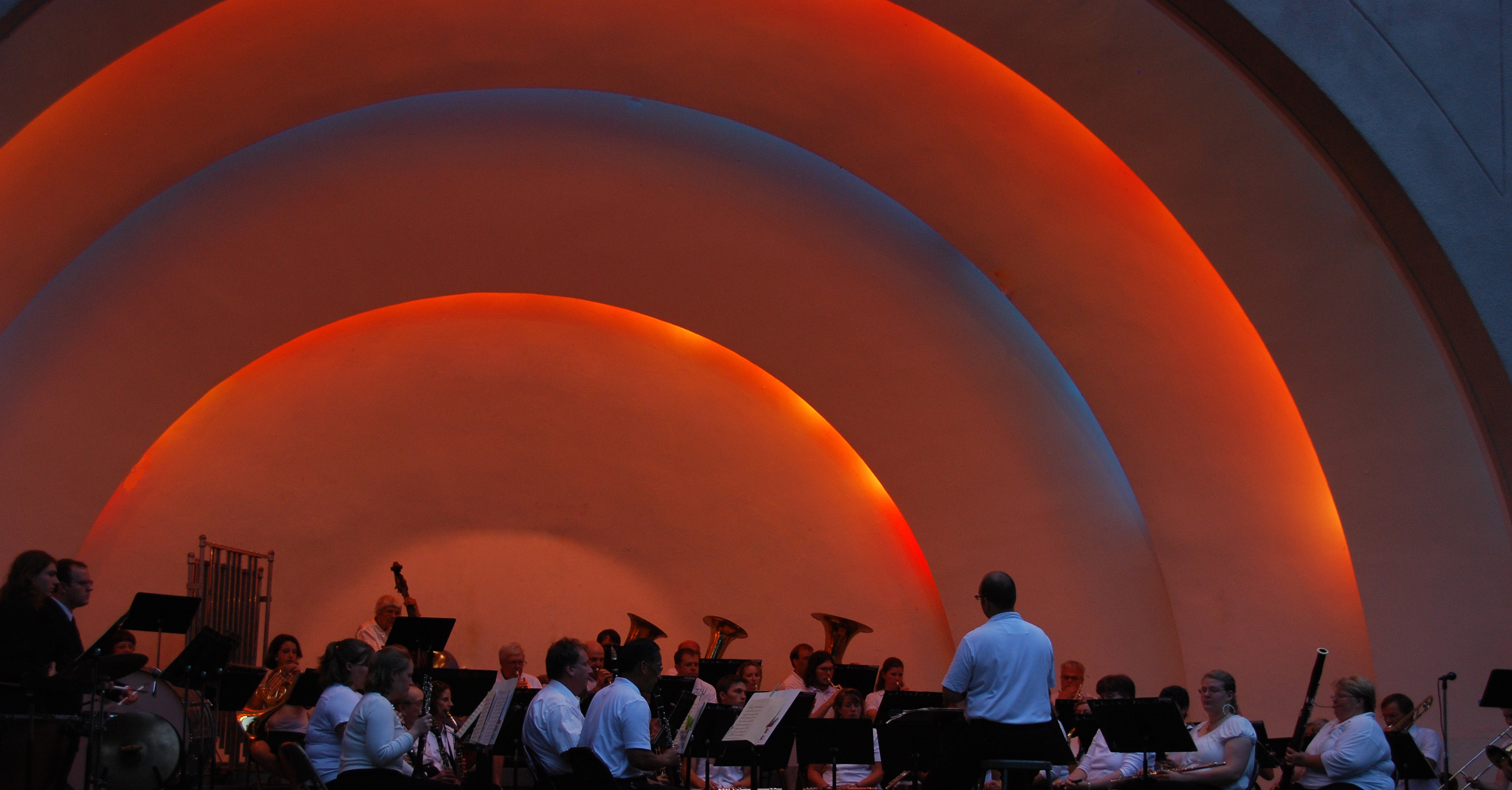
The Eau Claire Municipal Band, founded in 1902, is the city's oldest community musical organization.

The Chippewa Valley, especially Eau Claire, has groups and performers in the indie rock, metal/hardcore, hip hop, jam, blues, bluegrass, and jazz genres. Bands such as Arms Aloft, Bon Iver (Justin Vernon graduated from the University of Wisconsin-Eau Claire), and Laarks have achieved varying levels of national success. Eau Claire is also the original home of national artists Peter Wolf Crier and Megafaun, as well as many of the Minneapolis scene's popular acts including Mel Gibson and the Pants, and Digitata.

=== La Crosse ===
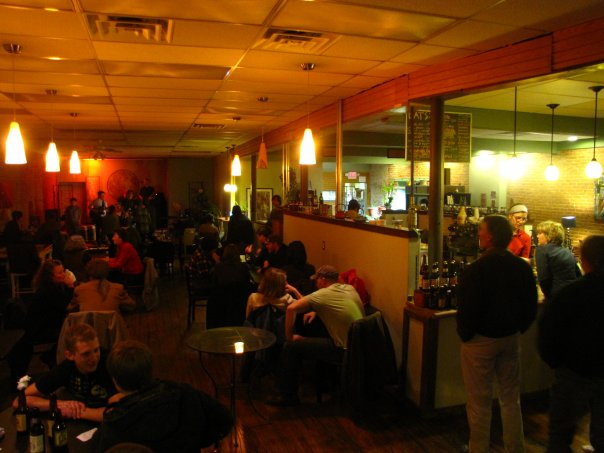
The Root Note is a prime venue for indie and underground music in the La Crosse region.

Many bands claim origin from La Crosse and the surrounding area. La Crosse has several venues for different genres. The Root Note is the prime venue for indie/underground music; JB's Speakeasy is home to all original live music; the Warehouse is the hotspot for alternative music; and the La Crosse Center is the area's largest indoor venue for concerts often hosting popular musicians. Popular musician Stephen Jerzak lived in La Crosse and attended high school there. The group The Jesters III evolved into the Christian rock group Hope.

=== Madison ===
Madison has an active and varied local music scene. Much of the local music caters to the tastes of college students. Compilation albums, such as Mad City Music, have attempted to extend the local music scene beyond Madison. The nationally successful Madison Scouts Drum and Bugle Corps also make their home in Madison.

A number of bands in the electronic and dark sides of music are alive and well in Madison, including Stromkern, Null Device, Caustic. The scene was started and kept alive through the efforts of Sonic Mainline records, Reverence, and the Inferno nightclub.

World music is well represented with such award-winning acts as Reptile Palace Orchestra and the yearly "Folkball".

Youngblood Brass Band, founded in Oregon, Wisconsin fuses New Orleans-style brass band music with hip-hop and funk. VO5 focuses on funk and disco.

Wisconsinite Butch Vig (attended the University of Wisconsin), formerly of Fire Town, formed Garbage (originally based in Madison) in 1993 with Steve Marker, Duke Erikson and Shirley Manson. Garbage had a #1 song on the Alternative Songs chart with "Number 1 Crush" in 1997.

Locksley was formed while the band members were at Madison West High School. They are an indie four-piece pop rock/power pop band that has had many songs featured in TV, movies, and advertisements. They were featured in multiple magazine spreads, most notably SPIN's "Breaking Out" and Rolling Stone's "6 Breakout Bands to Watch".

Richard Davis, Ben Sidran and weekly performer and world's-most-sampled funky drummer Clyde Stubblefield all call Madison home.

Rock band Stone Bogart was from Wisconsin. All three of their albums were recorded in Madison. They continued to record at Sleepless Nights after relocating. Their singer Sean Anders wrote and directed the movies Sex Drive, Hot Tub Time Machine, Mr. Popper's Penguins, and She's Out of My League. He also directed the Adam Sandler movie That's My Boy.

Aside from the many summer festivals, Madison hosts a yearly Madison Area Music Awards show, much like Milwaukee's Wisconsin Area Music Industry Awards show.

=== Milwaukee ===
The Milwaukee area has produced Steve Miller (rock, he attended the University of Wisconsin), Wladziu Valentino Liberace (piano), Al Jarreau (jazz), Eric Benet (neo-soul), Speech of Arrested Development (hip hop) "Mr. Wendal" 1992, Daryl Stuermer (rock), BoDeans (rock) "Closer to Free" 1996 (#3 on Adult Top 40 chart), Les Paul (jazz), the Violent Femmes (alternative) "Blister in the Sun" 1983, Citizen King (alternative) "Better Days (And the Bottom Drops Out)" 1999 (#3 on the Alternative Songs chart), Coo Coo Cal (rap), Die Kreuzen (punk), Andy Hurley drummer for Chicago's Fall Out Boy (punk), Rico Love (R&B, rapper), Andrew 'The Butcher' Mrotek drummer for Chicago's The Academy Is... (alt-rock), Showoff (pop-punk), Streetz-n-Young Deuces (rap), The Promise Ring (emo, indie), Lights Out Asia (post-rock), the Gufs (alt-rock), Brief Candles (rock) and Decibully (indie). Milwaukee hosts the annual Summerfest music festival.

=== Waukesha ===
Notable artists from Waukesha include multi-track recording inventor Les Paul "the Architect of Rock and Roll" and The BoDeans, a Summerfest favorite.

=== Wausau ===
John Altenburgh, Windsor Drive, and Johnny & The MoTones hail from the Wausau area.
