= Howard Knight =

Howard Knight may refer to:

- Howard Knight (politician), Ohio politician
- Howard A. Knight Jr., record producer and entrepreneur
