= Organist =

Musician who plays any type of organ

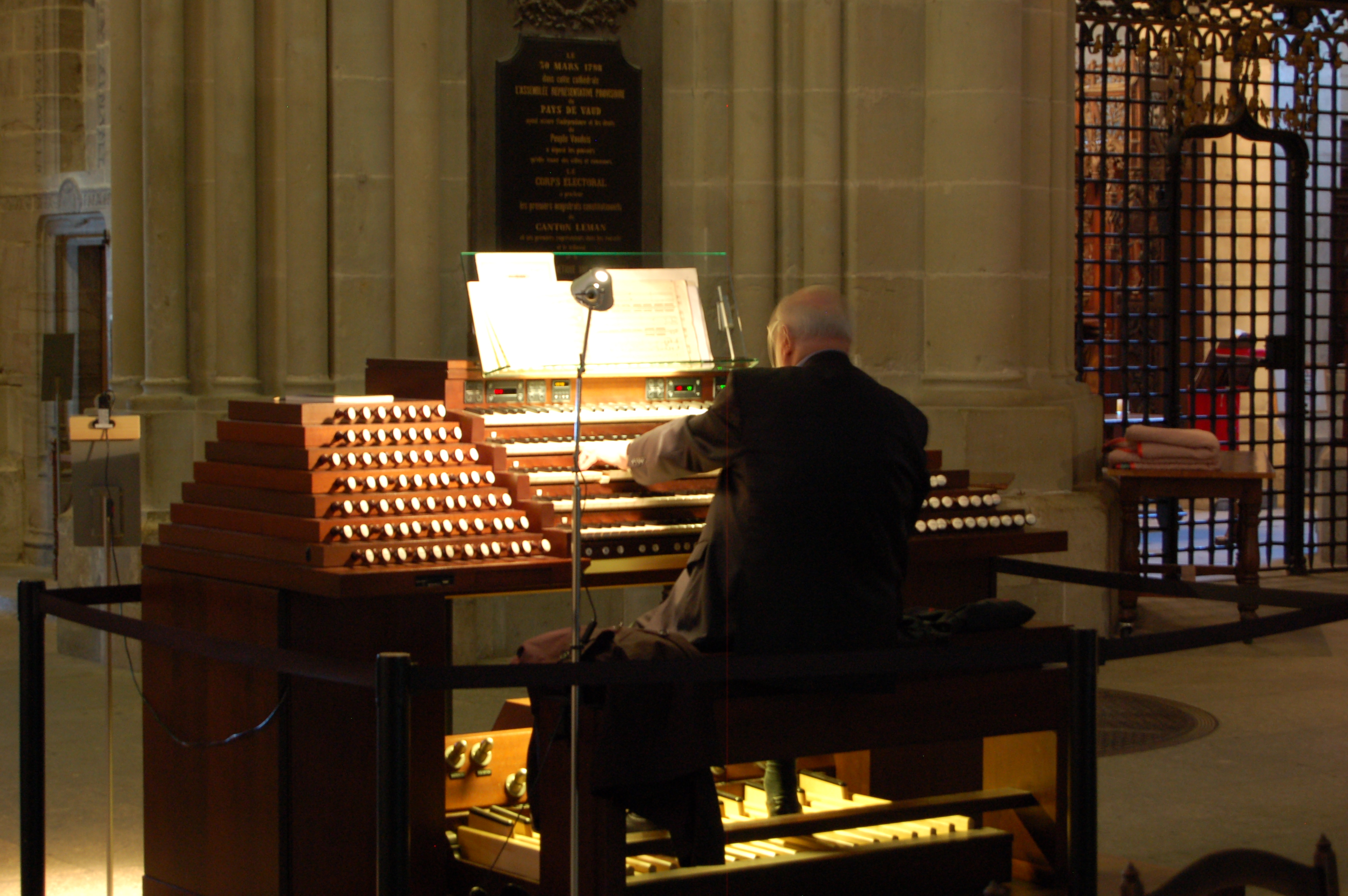
A cathedral organist in Lausanne Cathedral

An organist is a musician who plays any type of organ. An organist may play solo organ works, play with an ensemble or orchestra, or accompany one or more singers or instrumental soloists. In addition, an organist may accompany congregational hymn-singing and play liturgical music.

== Classical and church organists ==
The majority of organists, amateur and professional, are principally involved in church music, playing in churches and cathedrals. The pipe organ still plays a large part in the leading of traditional western Christian worship, with roles including the accompaniment of hymns, choral anthems and other parts of the worship. The degree to which the organ is involved varies depending on the church and denomination. It also may depend on the standard of the organist. In more provincial settings, organists may be more accurately described as pianists obliged to play the organ for worship services; nevertheless, some churches are fortunate to have trained organists capable of more elaborate "voluntaries" (the solo music before, during and after the service) and improvisation. As most churches can afford to employ only one musician, the organist is usually also responsible for directing and rehearsing the choir(s). In the twentieth-century, many pipe organs were replaced by pipe-less electronic and digital organs, often as a low-cost alternative to rebuilding older pipe organs.

In the English cathedral tradition the organist is now generally called "Director of Music", although their function is mainly in the training and direction of music rather than actual playing; there will generally be one or more assistant or sub-organists who play for most services and some recitals. Sometimes the organist will be assisted by an organ scholar. The post of organist at most of the great cathedrals includes recital work and choral training. Another function of an organist is often as teacher to future players. Few organists hold historically special positions such as Raùl Prieto Ramitez who is the Civic Organist of San Diego, the last true Civic Organist position still active in the US.

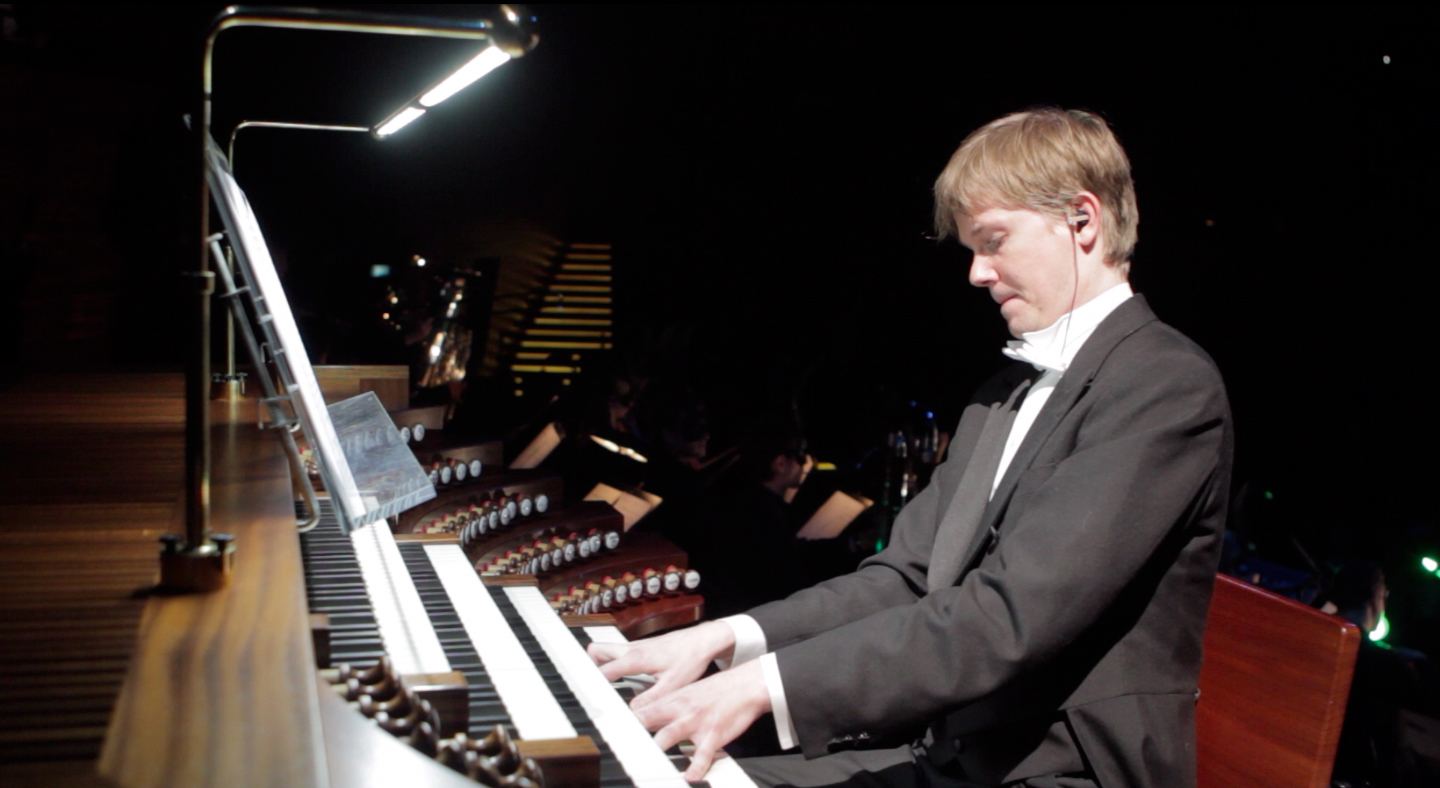
The concert organist Frederik Magle in Koncerthuset, Copenhagen

Since the strengths and weaknesses of the organ are difficult to understand without a good deal of playing experience, most music composed for organ has been written by organists. Since the majority of pre-twentieth-century organs were installed in churches, classical organ literature was almost exclusively written for liturgical use.

Many composers, therefore, are equally known for their performance talents, some historical examples being Johann Sebastian Bach, Dieterich Buxtehude, Felix Mendelssohn, Franz Liszt, César Franck, Camille Saint-Saëns, Charles-Marie Widor, Louis Vierne, Marcel Dupré and Maurice Duruflé, as well as improvisers such as Charles Tournemire, Pierre Cochereau, Pierre Pincemaille or Thierry Escaich. In Europe, the historical importance of churches as employers of musicians meant that many composers who now are very seldom remembered for their association with the organ were, nevertheless, engaged as professional organists: for example, Wolfgang Amadeus Mozart and Edward Elgar.

=== Ancient titles still in current use ===
In English churches, chapels and cathedrals the Organist may also be known as Master of the Choristers, Choirmaster or Director of Music; however, there are some ancient titles still in current usage:

- Magdalen College, Oxford – Organist and Informator Choristarum
- Savoy Chapel – Master of the Music
- York Minster – Master of the Music
- Westminster Cathedral – Master of Music
- Chichester Cathedral – Organist & Master of the Choristers
- Southwell Minster – Rector Chori
- Armagh Cathedral – Organist & Master of the Boys
- Church of St. Mary Magdalene, Newark-on-Trent – Master of the Song School

== Theatre organists ==
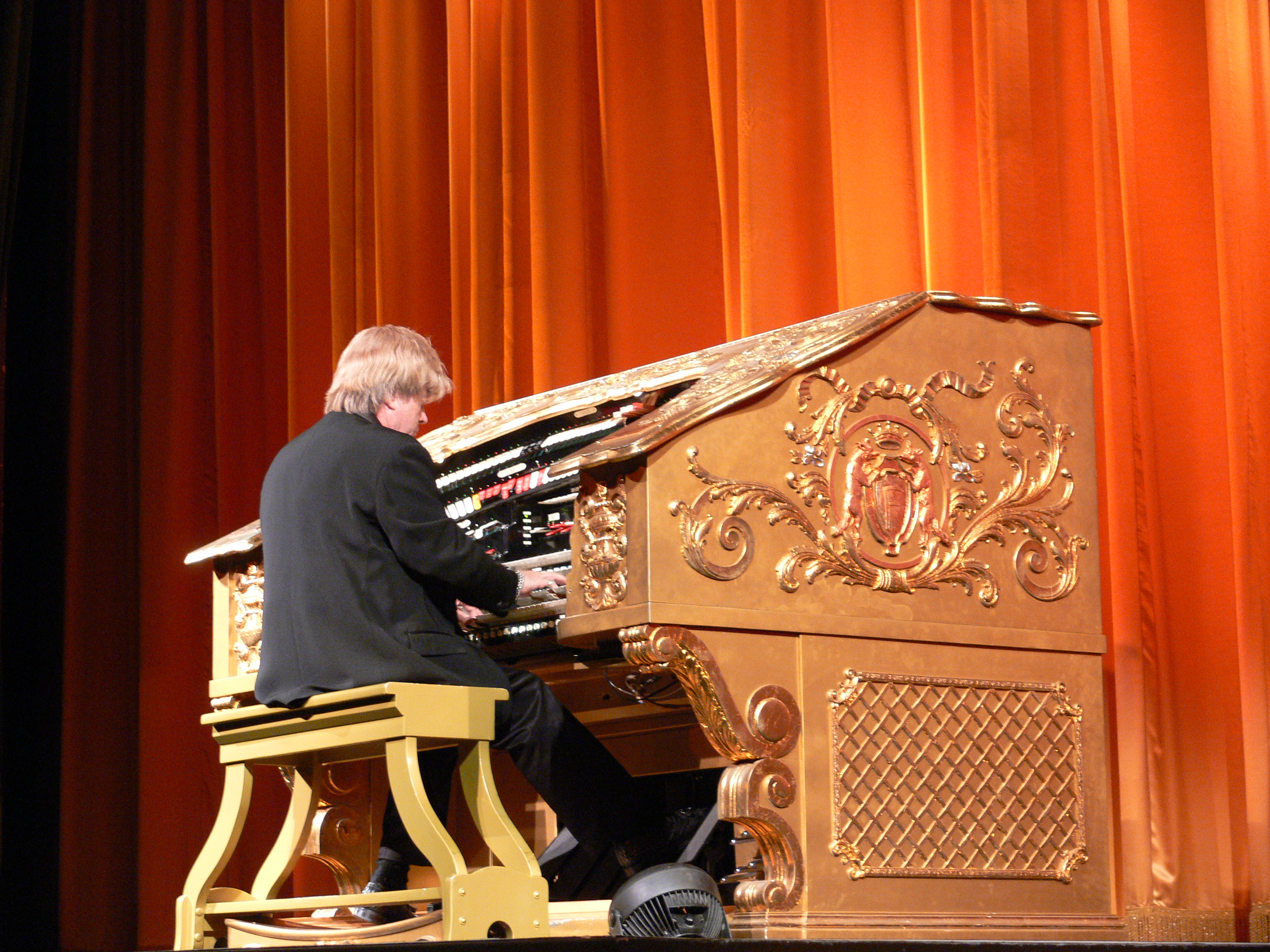
An organist playing the organ of the El Capitan, Los Angeles

The theatre organ has a separate repertoire and playing style, and in its heyday (during the first third of the twentieth century) there were considerable numbers of organists employed, many of whom played on Wurlitzer organs. A few carry on the tradition today.

== Stadium organists ==
Some sporting events, particularly baseball games, began hiring organists in the 20th century to provide music.

== Organists in popular music ==
There are many organists employed in the production of popular and jazz music. In the United States most of them play the Hammond organ, and many are classically trained, often in piano rather than organ. In England and Japan, one of the most popular series of instruments is the Yamaha Electone; while Electones of recent decades are more properly characterized as digital synthesizers rather than as organs, the player interface, and the skills and coordination required to play, mean that it may be effectively regarded by some, as an organ in these respects.

== Organizations ==
The Royal College of Organists (RCO) in the United Kingdom is the oldest institution and professional body that regulates organ studies. From that sprang the American Guild of Organists (AGO), the Gesellschaft der Orgelfreunde (GdO) in Germany, and the Royal Canadian College of Organists (RCCO). The Incorporated Association of Organists is an international society that fulfills an educational interest in the organ and is the holding company for regional Organist Associations, which regulate organ activities at the local level. All these institutions are oriented toward the organist involved in classical music rather than popular music, but have recently shown an interest in expanding their interests. There is also the American Theatre Organ Society.

== See also ==
- List of organists
- List of jazz organists
- Organ recital
- Organ shoes
- Stadium organist
