= John Ferriter =

American singer-songwriter

- Born: April 15, 1960; Tacoma, Washington, U.S.
- Died: July 25, 2019 (aged 59); Los Angeles, California, U.S.
- Education: University of California Santa Barbara (B.A.)
- Occupations: Producer, talent manager, chairman/CEO of The Alternative LLC, and singer/songwriter

John Ferriter (April 15, 1960 – July 25, 2019) was an American television producer and talent representative. The American entertainment industry executive was also a singer and songwriter, performing with two bands, including the Santa Barbara-based Stingrays where he was a frontman. The Stingrays opened for The Bangles, R.E.M., Maria McKee and Guns N' Roses.

Ferriter began his career as a talent manager and scout. Before launching his own celebrity representation and management firm The Alternative, he worked for decades as an executive with some of Hollywood's largest celebrity client representation agencies, including Octagon and the William Morris Agency where he was ultimately promoted to Executive Vice President.

== Education ==
Ferriter received a BA in history from the University of California Santa Barbara, where he was student body vice president and the program director at KCSB-FM.

== Career ==
=== William Morris Agency ===
For a span of nearly two decades, Ferriter worked at the William Morris Agency, the world's longest-running entertainment talent agency, where he was promoted to Executive Vice President, Worldwide Head of Non-scripted Television, and a member of the company's board of Directors after a successful career as a talent and packaging agent.

At the Agency, Ferriter was most known for representing top talent and packaging popular television shows, including non-scripted series like Project Runway, The Biggest Loser, Keeping Up with the Kardashians, On Air With Ryan Seacrest, The Donny & Marie Show, the late night comedy talk show Chelsea Lately and numerous Garth Brooks specials.

Ferriter is also recognized for transforming notable radio personalities, like Ryan Seacrest, Carson Daly, Jimmy Kimmel, Adam Carolla and Dr. Drew Pinsky into internationally known and celebrated television personalities. Some of his early clients included supermodel Claudia Schiffer and musician Jerry Garcia.

=== Octagon ===
In 2015, it was announced that Ferriter was amicably leaving his position at the conclusion of his five- year contract as the founding managing director of Octagon to launch The Alternative.

While at the helm of the entertainment management division of the global sports, music and entertainment marketing conglomerate, Ferriter had oversight over Octagon's talent management and representation services catering to celebrity entertainers.

=== The Alternative ===
The Alternative was formed in March 2016, and represents actors, anchors, hosts, musicians, producers and directors. Ferriter brought many of his clients into the representation and management firm, including Piers Morgan, Nancy O'Dell, 11-time Emmy award-winning director/producer Glenn Weiss, Holly Robinson Peete, Mark Wahlberg and others. New clients include Mike Love and The Beach Boys, Mike Wolfe from American Pickers, Jake Paul, The Empty Hearts and others.

== Global Commercial Television Production ==
Ferriter was an executive producer on a number of television series and specials, including Name That Tune for ITV in the United Kingdom, and CTV in Canada, For Peete's Sake for OWN, The Real Invincible and Remember When for Reelz, I am Novak for Amazon, Logheads for DIY, LeAnn & Eddie for VH-1, It Gets Better for MTV, I'm Positive for MTV, Now Brian Copeland for NBC, The Arsenio Hall Show for CBS/Tribune and Garth Brooks Live from Las Vegas. It Gets Better was Emmy-nominated and The Campaign for LGBT Youth won the Emmy.

== Music ==
=== The Stingrays ===
As a singer and songwriter, Ferriter formed and fronted The Stingrays from Santa Barbara, California. He co-wrote and produced the EP Talk To Me Johnny on True Records, and Coast To Coast and Praise the Music for Stonegarden Records. With the Stingrays, Ferriter performed hundreds of shows and opened for bands like The Bangles, R.E.M., Maria McKee and Guns N' Roses.

=== The Tearaways ===
In 2012, Ferriter rejoined The Tearaways from Santa Barbara and has co-written and co-produced several releases on Robo Records/Universal.

- We're All Gonna Drink Tonight
- Name That Tune
- The Earle Mankey Sessions: Vol. IV
- The Earle Mankey Sessions: Vol. 7
- The Earle Mankey Sessions: Vol. III" on Vivid Sounds Incorporated out of Japan.
- 2017 - Esquire
- 2018 - Anthems and Lullabies
- 2019 - We Grew Up on AM Radio

The newest release "DW Hofner, Martin Gibson, Ludwig Rickenbacker, Marshall Gretsch, Earle Hammond, Vox Fender, Esq." was released in September 2016.

== Death ==
Ferriter died on July 25, 2019, at Cedars-Sinai Medical Center in Los Angeles from complications of pancreatitis.
