= Bullmann =

Bullmann is a German surname. Notable people with the surname include:

- Maik Bullmann (born 1967), German Greco-Roman wrestler
- Udo Bullmann (born 1956), German politician

== See also ==
- Bullman
