= Next day air =

Next day air (or next-day air) is a form of express mail delivery.

It may also refer to:

- Next Day Air, a 2009 film
- Next Day Air (mixtape), a 2012 album
