= VO5 =

VO5 may refer to:

- VO5 (band), an American disco band
- Alberto VO5, a brand of shampoo formerly owned by Alberto-Culver
