= Organ Grinder Restaurant =

Defunct restaurant in Portland, Oregon, U.S.

Organ Grinder Restaurant - Portland
- Organ Grinder Portland Interior, Mid-to-Late 1970s
- Interactive map of Organ Grinder Restaurant - Portland

Restaurant information
- Established: August 1973
- Closed: February 1996
- Food type: Pizza
- Location: Portland, Multnomah, Oregon, United States
- Coordinates: 45.4862°N 122.5794°W

Organ Grinder Restaurant - Denver
- Organ Grinder Denver Interior, Late 1979 to Early 1980
- Interactive map of Organ Grinder Restaurant - Denver

Restaurant information
- Established: November 1979
- Closed: 1988
- Food type: Pizza
- Location: Denver, Denver, Colorado, United States
- Coordinates: 39.71108229564149°N 105.01552747976014°W

The Organ Grinder Restaurant was a two-location pizzeria which first opened in Portland, Oregon, with a second location established later in Denver, Colorado.

The Portland location was in operation from 1973 to 1996, while Denver operated from 1979 to 1988.

At one point, the Portland location housed the largest theatre pipe organ of its type in the world. The Denver facility was significantly larger than the Portland one, with approximately 1.6x more ground floor area.

== History ==
The Organ Grinder opened August 26, 1973, at 5015 Southeast 82nd Avenue between Foster and Holgate as a joint venture between the Forchuk brothers and Dennis Hedberg. The financing was provided by the Forchuks, and the organ and instrument expertise was provided by Hedberg. The original opening was for members of the American Theatre Organ Society. It opened to the public on September 27, 1973. It was an immediate success, with mean sales of $8,000 per night. The central location in Portland was initially a significant factor to its success, owing to the ease of access from the city and its suburbs. A second location was opened in Denver, Colorado in 1979, utilizing parts of organs Hedberg had acquired in order to expand the Portland location's capabilities. The Portland restaurant became fully owned by Hedberg in April 1985.

A confluence of factors caused the demise of the company, among them financial troubles unrelated to the restaurant suffered by Paul Forchuk in the late 1970s, the failure of the Denver location due to drug activity, and failure of Earthquake Ethel's (a Portland nightclub that was part of the Forchuk/Hedberg partnership), the decline of 82nd Avenue businesses as I-205 was opened in 1982, and the opening of a Chuck E. Cheese's in the mid-1980s a few blocks away. By late 1995, Hedberg could not perform needed roof repairs or parking lot maintenance. Attempts at finding investors in order to relocate the restaurant were unsuccessful.

The Organ Grinder closed permanently in 1996. When the restaurant closed, the organ was sold for parts. The Diaphone pipes were moved to Organ Stop Pizza in Mesa, Arizona. The console was moved to Conference Center in Groton, Massachusetts.

== Organ and performance ==
Hedberg's goal was to assemble an organ that contained every type of pipe and percussion that was ever available from the Wurlitzer organ firm, and to further his research into tremulant physics. The organ was assembled from a 3-manual, 13-rank organ originally housed in Portland's Oriental Theatre. Additions from several other organs were then acquired, including 32' Diaphones and a Vox Humana from the Portland's Liberty Theatre, a 32' Contra Bourdon from Boston's Old North Church, tympani from the Brooklyn Fox, and parts of other organs originating from Chicago, Cleveland, Denver, and Maine. It eventually grew to 51 ranks consisting of nearly 4000 pipes.

Hedberg did manage to assemble every major voice that had ever been used by Wurlitzer. Effects never associated with a Wurlitzer organ were also added, including a dive alarm originally from a submarine. By 1988 the organ had become the largest Wurlitzer pipe organ in the world. The original three-manual console was moved to another "pizza and pipes" restaurant in nearby Vancouver, Washington, when a four-manual console from Boston's Metropolitan Theatre was installed.

During performances, a mechanical monkey playing cymbals was regularly brought out to perform with the organist as Sousa's Washington Post March was played. A live monkey named Pizza Pete was also utilized alongside a hurdy-gurdy player. Pizza Pete would roam the dining room and beg for tips to fill a tin can. Regularly scheduled silent movies were shown on the hour, accompanied by the organ. A costumed "Mitzi Mouse" character was also part of the show. Bubble machines were installed in the ceilings with the purpose of appealing to children.

The organ was a central attraction for theater organ enthusiasts on several occasions. It was part of the 1973 convention of the American Theatre Organ Society.

In 1985 the restaurant initiated a program of "Old-Time Gospel Music" played on Sunday afternoons.

== Building ==
The building was designed to appear as an oversize Diaphone resonator. The architect of the building itself was Will Martin of the Martin, Soderstrom, and Matteson architectural firm. The organ console was placed in the center of the dining room floor. It was designed to seat 450 people, and had three levels of seating including the balcony. The walls were of unfinished cedar. Marquee lighting was prevalent throughout the interior at ceiling divisions. Most recently the building hosts a Chinese buffet named "Super King".

The organ was housed in glass chambers which could be viewed externally and internally to the restaurant. In order to keep the instrument in tune, refrigeration equipment weighing twenty tons was installed to effect a constant temperature within the chambers.

== Food ==
The Organ Grinder was known to serve pizza of better quality than the average "pizza and pipes" location. Unfortunately for the Organ Grinder (and its patrons) the dough-making equipment was outdated, and could not produce enough to keep up with demand. Therefore frozen dough was purchased, and the pizza quality suffered considerably, giving the Organ Grinder a poor culinary reputation that remained long after the equipment problems were rectified. Of particular note was a taco pizza named Percussion Pizza. Onion rings were also served.

== Recordings from the Organ Grinder ==
- The Organ Grinder's Wurlitzer is one of three organs used to record Symphonic Suite for Three Organs by Richard Purvis.
- (1975) Jonas – Gamba Records JN 104 (LP record): Jonas Nordwall, organist
- (1976) At the Organ Grinder – Organ Grinder OG-101 (LP record): David Lee, Jonas Nordwall, Paul Quarino, Don Simmons organists.
- (1976) David Lee – David Lee Company DLC888 (LP record): David Lee, organist.
- (1977) Omnibus – Jonas Nordwall JN-105 (LP record): Jonas Nordwall, organist
- (1979) At the Organ Grinder Volume 2 – Organ Grinder OGP-102 (LP record): Russ Chilson, Jack Coxon, Jonas Nordwall, Paul Quarino, Don Simmons organists
- (1979) At the Organ Grinder (Denver) – Organ Grinder OGD-101 (LP record): Jonas Nordwall, Patti Simon organists
- (1979) Space Organ – Crystal Clear CCS 6003 (LP record): Jonas Nordwall, organist
- (unknown) Don Simmons Plays The Organ Grinder Wurlitzer Pipe Organ – Sound Presents DS-OG (LP record): Don Simmons organist
- (1985) Power Pipes - (LP record): Dan Bellomy, organist.
- (unknown) Ho Ho Ho (LP record): James Nordwall, organist
- (unknown) Omnificent – Jonas Nordwall JN-106 (LP record): Jonas Nordwall, organist
- (unknown) Bits, Bytes & Pipes – James Nordwall JN-108 (LP record): James Nordwall, organist
- (unknown) Bits, Bytes & Pipes volume 2 – James Nordwall JN110DC (compact disc): James Nordwall, organist

== See also ==
- Pizza in Portland, Oregon
- A documentary film about the Organ Grinder restaurants began production in January, 2024.
