= Otto Luening =

German-American composer and conductor (1900–1996)

- Born: Otto Clarence Luening; June 15, 1900; Milwaukee, Wisconsin, U.S.
- Died: September 2, 1996 (aged 96) New York City, New York, U.S.
- Occupations: Composer, conductor
- Spouse(s): Ethel Codd Luening (m. 1927, div. 1959); Catherine Brunson (m. 1959)

Otto Clarence Luening (June 15, 1900 – September 2, 1996) was a German-American composer and conductor, and flutist. He was an early pioneer of tape music and electronic music.

== Biography ==
Luening was born in Milwaukee, Wisconsin to German parents, Eugene Luening, a conductor and composer, and Emma (nee Jacobs), an amateur singer. When he was 12, his family moved to Munich, where he studied music at the State Academy of Music. At age 17, he moved to Switzerland and attended the Municipal Conservatory of Music in Zürich and University of Zurich, where he studied with Ferruccio Busoni and Philipp Jarnach, and was also an actor and stage manager for James Joyce's English Players Company. He returned to the United States in 1924, and appeared mainly as a conductor of operas, in Chicago and the Eastman School of Music.

His conducting premieres included Virgil Thomson's The Mother of Us All, Gian Carlo Menotti's The Medium, and his own Evangeline. Evangeline, based on the poem by Henry Wadsworth Longfellow, premiered at Columbia University in New York City in 1948.

Luening's tape music, including A Poem in Cycles & Bells, Gargoyles for Violin & Synthesized Sound, and Sounds of New Music demonstrated the early potential of synthesizers and special editing techniques for electronic music. An October 28, 1952 concert with Vladimir Ussachevsky at the Museum of Modern Art in New York City introduced Fantasy in Space, flute recordings manipulated on magnetic tape, and led to an appearance on The Today Show with Dave Garroway. Luening was co-founder, along with Ussachevsky, of the Columbia-Princeton Electronic Music Center in 1958. He also co-founded Composers Recordings, Inc. in 1954, with Douglas Moore and Oliver Daniel.

He died in New York City in 1996. His notable students include Chou Wen-chung, Charles Wuorinen, Joan Tower, John Corigliano, Harvey Sollberger, Faye-Ellen Silverman, Dave Soldier, Sol Berkowitz, Elliott Schwartz, Bernard Garfield, Norma Wendelburg, Wendy Carlos and Karl Korte. See: List of music students by teacher: K to M#Otto Luening.

== Personal life ==
He married Canadian soprano Ethel Codd on April 19, 1927, and divorced in 1959. He married Catherine Brunson, a music teacher, September 5, 1959, and was with her until his death.

== Works ==
Luening set songs to words by Oscar Wilde, Emily Dickinson, Lord Byron, Walt Whitman, William Blake, Percy Bysshe Shelley, Sharpe, Naidu, Hermann Hesse, and Johann Wolfgang von Goethe. A selection of those recorded include "She walks in Beauty", "Farm Picture", "Little Vagabond", "Young Love", "Wake the serpent not", "Requiescat", "Venilia", "Locations and Times", "Noon Silence", "Visor'd", "Infant Joy", "Good-night", "I faint, I perish", "Transience", "At Christmas time/In Weihnachtszeiten", "Ach! wer bringt die schönen Tage", Songs of Emily Dickinson, "Love's Secret", "Harp the Monarch Minstrel swept", and a Joyce Cycle.
