= John Altenburgh =

American composer (born 1960)

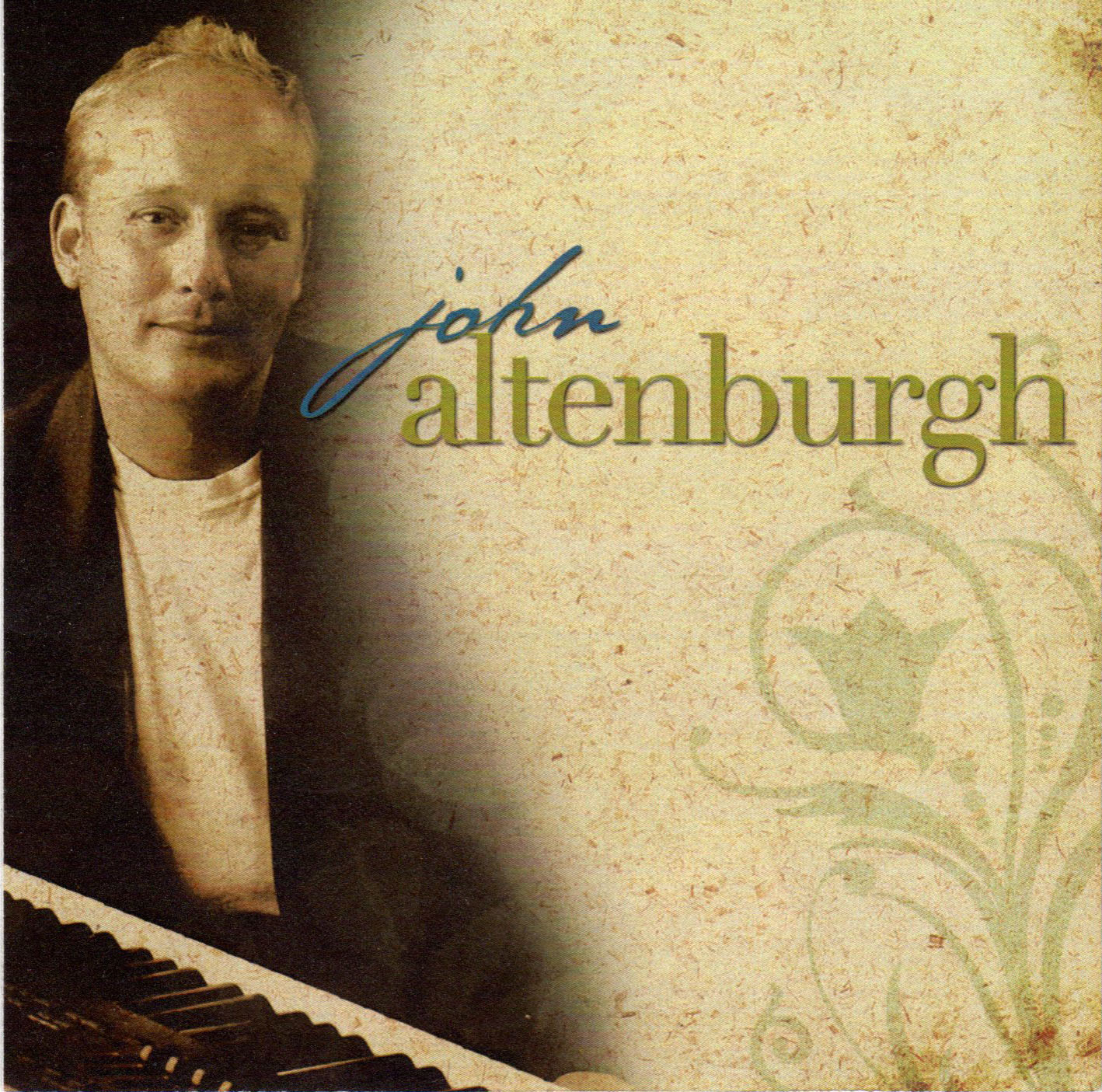

Background information
- Born: April 20, 1960 (age 66); Wausau, Wisconsin, United States
- Genres: Jazz, blues
- Occupations: Musician, record producer, record label owner
- Instruments: Piano, guitar
- Labels: Altenburgh Records, The Orchard/Sony Entertainment
- Member of: Johnny & The MoTones
- Website: altenburgh.com

John Altenburgh (born John Altenburg, April 20, 1960) is an American jazz and blues pianist, composer, arranger and producer who has made his home in Mosinee, Wisconsin. Altenburgh studied music at the University of Wisconsin–Oshkosh. He is the founder of Altenburgh Records distributed by The Orchard a division of Sony Entertainment and has recorded numerous albums as a solo artist and with his blues group, Johnny & The MoTones.

== Early years ==
Altenburgh was born in Wausau, Wisconsin, and started playing rock music as a teenager in the late 1970s to early 1980s, most notably with the Wisconsin rock band, Bad Habit. During this time, he had an opportunity to sign with Geffen Records, a record label that had just signed John Lennon for his comeback. Altenburgh was writing and recording in the style of the New Wave Rock sound that was just gaining popularity at that time. After sending Geffen a demo of recent songs he had recorded, the A&R Director at Geffen asked Altenburgh for more music. As Altenburgh stated, "I took the next six months writing new material. What I didn't realize, at that time, is they wanted more music immediately, not in six months. When I contacted them with my new recordings, they said I was too late, that that type of music was already predominate in the pop/rock industry. So they didn't sign me." Altenburgh, discouraged over missed opportunity, left the rock world completely.

In 1981 Altenburgh enrolled at the University of Wisconsin-Oshkosh and studied music/recording technology. Altenburgh performed a double senior recital, performing both classical voice and classical guitar. In 1985, after college, Altenburgh returned to his hometown of Mosinee, Wisconsin, bought the Karl Mathie House and built RiverSide Productions Recording Studio. In the 1980s, Altenburgh wrote production music for such national companies as Ski Doo, JI Case and US Cellular.

== Solo artist ==
By the late 1980s, Altenburgh recorded his first jazz album entitled Old City. With that first release in 1989, Altenburgh Records was formed. Early distributors of Altenburgh Records included; City Hall Records, MS Distributing, Twinbrook and many others. Altenburgh signed and/or recorded numerous groups/musicians throughout the United States including; Mike Metheny, Gary Brunotte, Melvin Rhyne and Rebecca Parris.

Altenburgh followed up Old City with Volume 2 in 1991 garnering much radio airplay and the song "Jim & Ellys Summer Vacation" appeared in The Italian Jazz Charts Altenburgh followed that up with the 1993 release of Generations which was the first of Altenburgh's albums to land in the Jazz Charts at CMJ. The 1995 release Heartland '95 and the '97 release, Legends of Keelerville both landed in the CMJ Jazz Chart as well as The Gavin Report Jazz Chart. Altenburgh produced three videos under the direction of Chris Seehafer, that were frequently aired on such National shows as BET's Bet on Jazz {Centric}. Altenburgh began touring to support his albums performing at such venues as the Black Hill Blues & Jazz Festival, The Jazz in June Festival, The Elkhart Jazz Festival, The Miller Heritage Jazz Festival and numerous others throughout the United States, including The Big Top Chautauqua where they were recorded live and aired nationally on Tent Shore Radio. Altenburgh continued to release jazz albums through the 1990s, including; Christmas at Buzz's Restaurant in which Altenburgh's rendition of the song, "Amazing Grace" was chosen as an archive recording in the Library of Congress music archives. also included; were the entire "Christmas at Buzz's Restaurant" and "Generations" albums. In 2003, Altenburgh recorded the Latin Jazz album, Far From River Road, where Altenburgh abandoned the piano and returned to the Classical Guitar. He recorded and featured himself strictly on classical/Latin guitar for an entire album. Altenburgh's jazz career has been written about in the books; The Jazz Discography by Tom Lords and Music Hounds Jazz, The Essential Album Guide.

== Johnny & the MoTones ==
In 2004, Altenburgh loaned Sun Studios, Memphis TN some antique recording devices for their museum and in appreciation, John Schorr, President of Sun Studios, offered Altenburgh to come and do a roots type of recording at the famous studio. Altenburgh agreed and the result was the 2005 release, Two Hits for The Kitty "The Sun Studio Sessions." The album was in the World's blues chart at Roots Music Report for 18 weeks and the beginning of Altenburgh's blues group, Johnny & The MoTones was established. To date, the group has recorded five albums, all having spent significant time in the blues charts at Cashbox, Roots Music Report, iTunes, cdbaby and others. The group has also made many videos and documentaries about their time at Sun Studios and Fame Studios, Muscle Shoals, AL where they recorded their second album entitled, Get Gone "The Muscle Shoals Sessions." Subsequent releases Nothin' To Lose and Shake It followed in 2010 and 2013 respectively. Both albums spent significant time in every major blues chart and the track, "Maybe Baby" landed in the Roadhouse Blues and Boogie Top 40 Chart as compiled by Cashbox and beachshag.com.

The 2013 release Shake It was heard world wide on such syndicated blues shows as; Blues Deluxe, Confessing The Blues, Smokestack Lightning, The Americana Music Show (several times), The House of Blues Radio Hour with Dan Aykroyd, Main Street Blues and others. It marked the first time that the group, not only appeared in Blues Charts but Americana Music Charts as well. The album not only had straight blues but jumped into many other musical styles. Blues Blast Magazine said, " Johnny & The MoTones come out swingin' long and strong with their self-produced collection of soul-based swing, jump swamp and gospel blues. They want you to "Shake It," and deliver on all counts. Johnny & The MoTones have received international attention as Vincente Zumel producer of La Hora Del Blues Show in Spain wrote: "Johnny & The MoTones come back again with an album full of electrifying rhythm and blues and soul. Gratifying in all senses, Johnny & The MoTones show a complete amazing credibility, engaging all listeners with a bunch of songs performed on an easygoing way, together with an amazing bite and an own personal style, which makes them look different from many of their music colleagues." Again the group found its way into various blues charts, including; Roots Music Report, Cashbox, CD Baby, and iTunes. When asked, in an interview conducted by the Greek writer, Michael Limnios of Greek Blues, "What is the philosophy of the MoTones?" Altenburgh stated; "I love exploring all music because there is good in every music genre. So for the MoTones, we have no set course. It's obviously based in the blues but R&B/Soul/Jazz and rock rhythms will always have influence on us."

== Producer ==
Altenburgh is a producer and executive producer whose credits include works by Mike Metheny, John Greiner, Rebecca Parris, The Kenny Hadley Big Band, Bob Kase, Gary Brunotte, Gary Sivils, Dennis Mitcheltree, Janet Planet, Otis McLennon, Chris O'Keefe, Randy Sabien, Melvin Rhyne, and many others.

Altenburgh's compositions and recordings have been used in various television and radio programs for theme songs and soundtracks. Many of his recordings have appeared in various jazz and blues charts including: Roots Music Report, CMJ, JazzTimes, Cashbox and others. He has appeared as a sideman on numerous other recordings.

Altenburgh is known for his work with vintage Wisconsin music and has produced and archived several projects. Altenburgh has been a contributor to the Sun Studio Museum, in Memphis, Tennessee.

== Historian ==
Altenburgh is a Wisconsin historian who was an adviser for the Marathon County Historical Museum exhibit, "Long Live Rock & Roll" 1999–2000. He is a founding and current committee member of The Rock & Roll Revival Committee of Wisconsin. He has on loan family Civil War artifacts for the Marathon County Historical Museum's exhibit 'The Road to Civil War & Back: Marathon County & Beyond, 1861 – 1865' Altenburgh has also on loan, at the Sun Studio Museum, Memphis TN antique recording devices from the 1950s. In addition, Altenburgh authored the book, Altenburgh Family History Since 1756 and produced the historical video, Mosinee Wisconsin The Jack Altenburg Film Collection. A collection of films from the 1940s–1970s that explore Mosinee, WI and surrounding areas. Altenburgh also produced the double cd set entitled; Wisconsin Rocks! A collection of recordings from Wisconsin rock bands from the 1950s through the 1970s. Altenburgh currently resides in the Karl Mathie House listed in the National Register of Historic Places listings in Marathon County, Wisconsin.

== Discography ==
=== Solo ===
- Old City (1989) Orchard/Sony
- Vol. 2 (1991) Orchard/Sony
- Generations (1993) Orchard/Sony
- Heartland 95 (1995) Orchard/Sony
- Legends of Keelerville (1997) Orchard/Sony
- Christmas at Buzz's Restaurant (1998) Orchard/Sony
- A Wisconsin Christmas (2000) Orchard/Sony
- Far from River Road (2002) Orchard/Sony
- Remnants of the Twentieth Century (2003) Altenburgh
- The Best of (2004) Orchard/Sony
- A Wisconsin Christmas (A Return to the Grand) (2007) Altenburgh
- Sounds of Latin (2018) Orchard/Sony
- Solo Piano (2018) Orchard/Sony
- Live (2020) Orchard/Sony
- Return to River Road (2021) Orchard/Sony

=== Bad Habit ===
- Live in Concert (2000)
- Rock & Roll Revival 97 (Various Artists) (1998)
- Wisconsin Rock (Various Artists) (2000)

=== Johnny & the Mo-Tones ===
- Two Hits for the Kitty (The Sun Studio Sessions) (2005) Orchard/Sony
- Get Gone (The Muscle Shoals Sessions) (2007) Orchard/Sony
- Nothin' to Lose (2011) Orchard/Sony
- Shake It (2013) Orchard/Sony
- Highway 51 (2018) Orchard/Sony

=== As guest ===
- Luke West, Live
- Gene Fondow, Anthology
- Jeff Bushman, Anthology
- Mark Mattioli, Anthology
- Chambray
- New Country Sound, The Lost Shindig Sessions
- Dan Dougherty, From Me to Him
- Dan Dougherty, A Song Like That
- Kathy Schweiger, A Christmas Postcard
- The Mark Ladley Trio
- The Mark Ladley Trio, Strictly Business
- Petrified Alien Brain Blues Band, Live at Scott Street
- Emergency on Planet Earth, with World Burning/ Various Artists
- Robin Lee, New Orleans will Rise Again
- Bret & Frisk, From Our Home to Yours
- Mark Ladley, Final Call

=== As producer, engineer ===
- World Burning, Pure & Uncut
- Gary Sivils, You Must Believe in Music
- Naima Only, Trust Your Heart
- Naima, So Much Like Real Life
- Gary Brunotte, Yesterday's Dream
- Rebecca Parris with the Kenny Hadley Big Band, A Beautiful Friendship
- Mike Metheny, From Then 'Til Now
- The Kenny Hadley Big Band, Come Sunday
- Mike Metheny, Street of Dreams
- The Mark Ladley Trio, Evidence
- John Greiner, Shades
- John Greiner, From A to B
- Strange Pleasures, Evil Blues
- Dennis Mitcheltree, Transformation
- Dennis Mitcheltree, Union
- Kathy Schweiger, Moments to Remember
- Kathy Schweiger, A Christmas Postcard
- Chambray
- Wisconsin Rocks, Various Artists
- Petrified Alien Brain Blues Band, Fast & Bulbous
- Petrified Alien Brain Blues Band, Too Wet To Plow, Too Windy To Stack BB's
- Don Penfield, Yesterdays
- Don Penfield, My Most Requested Tunes
- Bob Kase, Street of Dreams
- Bob Kase, Those Paris Nights
- Bob Kase, No Time for Daydreams
- Mark Ladley, Final Call
- Luke West, Live
- Bret & Frisk, From Our Home to Yours
- Gene Fondow, Anthology
- Jeff Bushman, Anthology
- Mark Mattioli, Anthology
- Great Northern Blues Society, Bake Sale Vol 1
- New Country Sound, The Lost Shindig Sessions
- Dan Dougherty, From Me to Him
- Dan Dougherty, A Song Like That
- Chris O'Keefe, Anthology
- Kathy Schweiger, A Christmas Postcard
- The Mark Ladley Trio
- The Mark Ladley Trio, Strictly Business
- Petrified Alien Brain Blues Band, Live at Scott Street

=== Compilations ===
(partial list)

- Musician Magazine Sampler Vol. 10 Various Artists (1993)
- Rock & Roll Revival 97 Various Artists (1998)
- Wisconsin Rock Various Artists (2000)
- Christmas International 1 Various Artists (2011) Rosenklang
- Classical Music Nature Moods, Vol 2 Various Artists (2011) AudioSparx
- Pure Soft Rock Volume 1 (2011) AudioSparx
- Jazz Rock 3 Various Artists (2011) Rosenklang
- Pure Soft Rock: Volume 4 Various Artists (2011) Rosenklang
- Dixieland 1 Various Artists (2011) Rosenklang
- Knocking at the Door Soft Rock, Vol. 3 Various Artists (2011) AudioSparx
- Down To Dixieland– New Orleans – Instrumental Various Artists (2011) AudioSparx
- Family Music 3 Various Artists (2011) Rosenklang
- Electric Blues 4 Various Artists (2011) Rosenklang
- Down to Dixieland – New Orleans – Instrumental Various Artists (2011) Rosenklang
- Summer Evening 2 Various Artists (2012) Rosenklang
- That's Bebop – Instrumental Jazz Music Vol. 2 Various Artists (2013) AudioSparx
- The Ecstasy Calendar November (Nu Jazz) Various Artists (2014) Ecstasy
- Christmas–Blast–Vol. 1 (40 Best R&B & Jazz Vocal Songs) Various Artists (2014) Happy Life
- Christmas–Blast–Vol. 2 (40 Best of Easy Listening, Classic, New Age and Rock & Roll Vocal) Various Artists (2014) Happy Life
- Laid Back Latin (Chilled Out Bossanova & Latin Jazz Tunes) Various Artists (2014) Musique Sensuelle
- Sexy Latin Jazz Various Artists (2014) Musique Sensuelle
- Illinois Vol 4 Various Artists (2015) AudioSparx
- Illinois Vol 6 Various Artists (2015) AudioSparx
- Vintage Plug 60: Session 3 – Jazz Rock Various Artists (2015) Ecstasy
- Vintage Plug 60: Session 62 – Soft Rock, Vol. 2 Various Artists (2015) Ecstasy
- Vintage Plug 60: Session 23 – Country Rock, Vol. 2 Various Artists (2015) Ecstasy
- Vintage Plug 60: Session 101 – Regional & Traditional Blues, Vol. 1 Various Artists (2015) Ecstasy
- Guitarra Relajante Various Artists (2015) Chiquito
- Heartbreak Blues – Best of, Vol. 1 Various Artists (2015) Ecstasy
- Original Spanish Flamenco Guitar Various Artists (2015) Whiskey Lullaby
- Political Blues – Best of, Vol. 1 Various Artists (2015) Ecstasy
- Under His Wing: 50 Beautiful Gospel & Christian Songs Various Artists (2015) Whiskey Lullaby
- Blues Day, Vol. 5 Various Artists (2015) Audiosparx
- Flamenco Classics (Music of Spain) Various Artists (2015) Whiskey Lullaby
