= Peter Wolf Crier =

Indie-rock group from Minneapolis

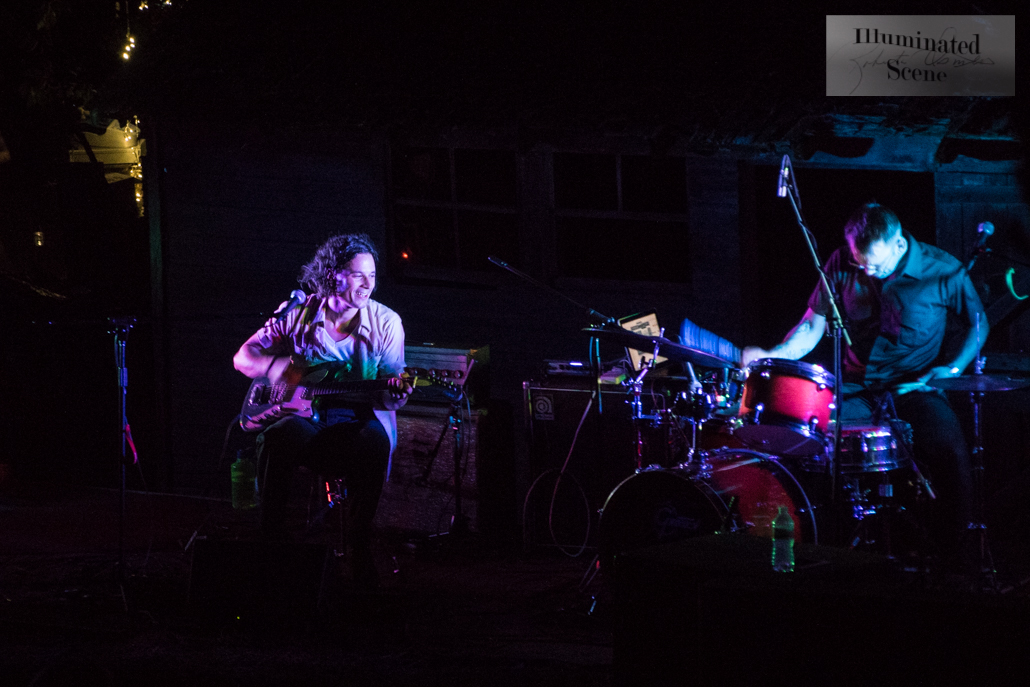

Background information
- Origin: Minneapolis, Minnesota
- Genres: Folk rock, indie rock
- Years active: 2009–present
- Label: Jagjaguwar
- Members: Peter Pisano; Brian Moen
- Website: peterwolfcrier.com

Peter Wolf Crier is a Minneapolis-based folk rock band. They signed with Jagjaguwar in 2010.

The duo consists of previous Wars of 1812 band member Peter Pisano and Laarks' Brian Moen. Pisano previously worked for St. Francis-St. James United School in Saint Paul, Minnesota. Moen has frequently collaborated with Bon Iver's Justin Vernon on his side project The Shouting Matches.

== Discography ==
Inter-Be
Review scores
Source	Rating
The A.V. Club	B+

Garden Of Arms
Review scores
Source	Rating
The A.V. Club	B

=== Albums ===
- Inter-be (Jagjaguwar, 2010)
- Garden of Arms (Jagjaguwar, 2011)
- Plum Slump (2015)
