= List of jazz organists =

This is an alphabetized list of notable musicians who play or played jazz organ. Category is listed as: Category:Jazz organists.

== A ==
- Tihomir "Pop" Asanović
- Brian Auger
- Price Alan

== B ==
- Count Basie
- Pat Bianchi
- Judy Blair
- Carla Bley
- André Brasseur
- Gary Brunotte
- Milt Buckner
- Dan Bellomy

== C ==
- Doug Carn
- Mike Carr
- Brian Charette
- Ray Charles
- Clifton "Jiggs" Chase
- Call Cobbs Jr.
- Alice Coltrane
- Tom Coster

== D ==
- Jackie Davis
- Wild Bill Davis
- Lenny Dee
- Joey DeFrancesco
- 'Papa' John DeFrancesco (born 1940)
- Barbara Dennerlein
- Bill Doggett
- Dr. John

== E ==
- Charles Earland

== F ==
- Georgie Fame
- Clare Fischer
- Dan Fogel
- Chris Foreman

== G ==
- Jared Gold
- Larry Goldings

== H ==
- Atsuko Hashimoto
- Herbie Hancock
- Alan Haven
- Cory Henry
- Milt Herth
- Ingfried Hoffmann
- Richard "Groove" Holmes
- John Hondorp
- Wayne Horvitz

== J ==
- Booker T. Jones

== K ==
- Wojciech Karolak
- Bruce Katz
- Charles Kynard

== L ==
- Eddie Landsberg
- Mike LeDonne
- Ron Levy
- Ed Lincoln
- Eddy Louiss
- Gene Ludwig
- Bobby Lyle

== M ==
- Jack McDuff
- Jimmy McGriff
- John Medeski
- Tony Monaco
- Amina Claudine Myers

== P ==
- Don Patterson
- John Patton
- Clarence Palmer
- Trudy Pitts
- Roy Powell
- Billy Preston
- Don Pullen

== R ==
- Sun Ra
- Mike Ratledge
- Mel Rhyne
- Doug Riley
- Freddie Roach

== S ==
- Merl Saunders
- Paul Shaffer
- Rhoda Scott
- Shirley Scott
- Jimmy Smith
- Johnny "Hammond" Smith
- Lonnie Smith
- Ståle Storløkken

== T ==
- James Taylor
- Charles Thompson
- Akiko Tsuruga

== W ==
- Paul Wagnberg
- Dan Wall
- Fats Waller
- Robert Walter
- Walter Wanderley
- Baby Face Willette
- Reuben Wilson
- Lyman Woodard
- Klaus Wunderlich

== Y ==
- Sam Yahel
- Larry Young

== Z ==
- Joe Zawinul
