= Ethel Codd Luening =

Canadian soprano

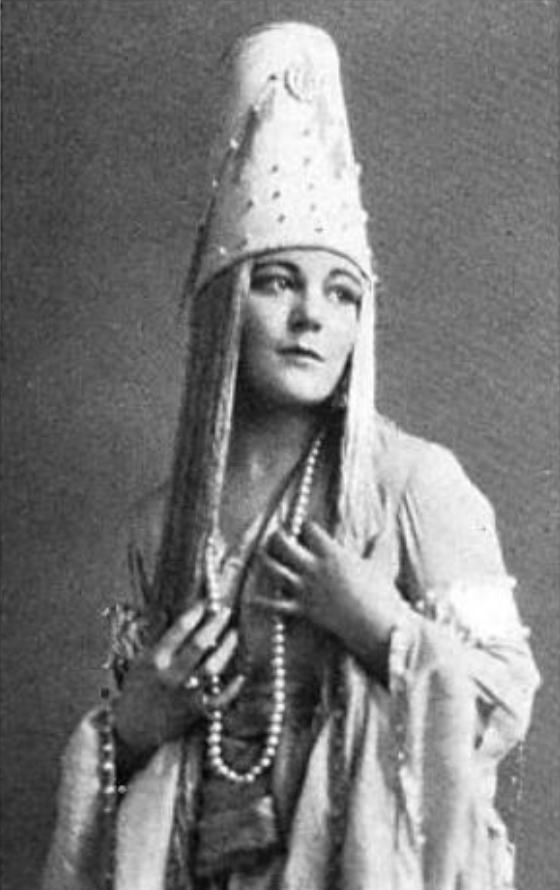
- Ethel Codd, from a 1927 publication
- Born: December 25, 1906; Winnipeg, Manitoba, Canada
- Died: November 27, 1989 (aged 82)
- Occupations: Singer, voice teacher
- Spouse: Otto Luening

Ethel Codd Luening (December 25, 1906 – November 27, 1989) was a Canadian soprano singer in concerts and operas in the 1920s and 1930s, and taught at Bennington College.

== Early life and education ==
Codd was born in Winnipeg, Manitoba, and lived some of her childhood in Leavenworth, Washington, the daughter of Alfred Codd and Winifred Nelson Codd. Her sister Margaret and brothers Frank and Arthur were also singers. She was a member of the Brandon Opera in 1925 and 1926, and earned a certificate in opera from the Eastman School of Music in 1928, with further studies in Germany.

== Career ==
Luening, a coloratura or lyric soprano, had a career on both concert and opera stages. She sang the role of Constanza in a 1926 production of Mozart's The Abduction of the Seraglio in Rochester. In 1927 she was soloist for a radio concert by the Rochester Philharmonic. In 1928, she debuted an Aaron Copland song, "Vocalise", with the composer as her piano accompanist. In 1929 she gave several recitals in New York City, with pianist Ernst Bacon at Steinway Hall, and with harpist Alberto Salvi. She was known for performing works by and with her composer husband, Otto Luening, including at Carnegie Hall in 1930, and at a 1943 concert at the University of Maine.

In 1931, the Long Beach Press-Telegram described her voice as "unusual", saying it "has the warmth and resonance of a contralto voice combined with the soaring bird-notes of the soprano. Even in the highest registers her voice did not lose its sweet, soothing mellow qualities." Luening taught at Bennington College from 1934 to 1944, where she was head of the voice department. She made several recordings. In 1938 she was in the cast of a production of The Marriage of Figaro in Rochester, New York. She also debuted "Yankee Doodle Fantasy" by Harry Partch.

== Personal life ==
Codd married composer Otto Luening in 1927, and they divorced in 1959. She died in 1989, at the age of 82. Her papers are in the Eastman School of Music library.
