= Bullman =

Bullman is a surname. Notable people with the surname include:

- Gale Bullman (1901–1977), American football player and coach
- John Bullman (c.1870–1922), American jockey
- Joseph Bullman, English documentary and drama director
- Mike Bullman, American musician
