= Oliver Daniel =

- Born: November 24, 1911; De Pere, Wisconsin, U.S.
- Died: December 30, 1990 (aged 79) Scarsdale, U.S.

Oliver Daniel (November 24, 1911 – December 30, 1990) was an American arts administrator, musicologist, and composer.

He worked as a music executive for CBS, then took a job at BMI (Broadcast Music Incorporated), creating that organization's Concert Music Department in 1954. Also in 1954 he helped found the CRI (Composers Recordings, Inc.) record label, along with composers Otto Luening and Douglas Moore. In 2000, CRI released a tribute CD for Daniel, titled Looking to the East.

For many years, Daniel worked with and promoted composers such as Henry Cowell, Lou Harrison, Alan Hovhaness, Colin McPhee, and Peggy Glanville-Hicks. He also wrote an exhaustive (and somewhat hagiographic) biography of the conductor Leopold Stokowski titled Leopold Stokowski: A Counterpoint of View (1982).

For much of his life Daniel lived in Scarsdale, New York, with his partner Donald Ott.
