= Arms Aloft =

American punk band

- Origin: Eau Claire, Wisconsin, United States
- Genres: Punk rock
- Years active: 2007 – present
- Labels: Red Scare Industries, Kiss of Death Records
- Members: Alex Bammel; Jack Gribble; Lauren Anderson; Seth Gile; Antho Sanchis aka Tony No Cheese
- Past members: Zach Holder; Tyler McCormick; Isaiah Davis; Matt Keil aka Jootst Mane
- Website: Official Site

Arms Aloft is an American punk group from Eau Claire, Wisconsin, United States. Their name is a reference to a song by Joe Strummer and the Mescaleros on their 2003 album Streetcore. Since their founding in 2007, the band has released two LPs, two EPs, one live album, and four split singles. They have appeared on stage with notable groups such as Teenage Bottlerocket, The Falcon, Dillinger Four, and NOFX. Arms Aloft have appeared at festivals including The War on X-Mas, The Gilead Media Music Festival, The Fest, and Manchester Punk Festival.

== Music ==
Arms Aloft are described as belonging to the tradition of melodic hardcore bands like Jawbreaker, Hot Water Music, None More Black, and The Menzingers. As described by frontman Seth Gile, the band's lyrics frequently focus on left politics and how they affect people personally. Their music accordingly has covered explicitly political topics such as pollution, global warming, Wall Street corruption, and drone strikes, as well as time-honored topics such as breakups and boredom.

== History ==
The band's original lineup emerged from the Eau Claire high school music scene that produced members of bands like Bon Iver and Laarks. In an interview, Gile recalls his first ever public performance as a musician came at a high school battle of the bands showcase that also featured Justin Vernon of Bon Iver as well as future members of Gayngs and Megafaun.

In the mid-2000s the band formed, and had self-recorded and released a demo EP by mid-2007. The demo was also released as a set of free MP3's that were praised by one reviewer as " potent, gravelly and melodic." In 2008, Dead Format Records released the band's debut 7-inch EP, Comfort at Any Cost. Brian Shultz of Punknews called it "surprisingly poetic" in a generally positive review.

After releasing a split EP with The Manix and The Fake Boys, and adding Jack Gribble to the lineup after former drummer Zach Holder moved out of the area, Arms Aloft released their first album, Sawdust City. It was recorded at Nicollet Recording Studio in Minneapolis with Dustin Miller, and released a year later on Kiss of Death Records. The release was followed up by a 53 day promotional tour. The album title was a reference to a nickname for their home town, Eau Claire — as explained by frontman Seth Gile, the "desolate" name reflected the band's "weird pride in our pessimism" and love of their Eau Claire that's reflected in their lyrics. The album was released to positive reviews, receiving 4.5/5 stars from Punknews.org, who called it "the best punk record I've heard all year". A live record, recorded at Gilead Music Festival, followed in 2014.

Their follow-up LP, What a Time to Be Barely Alive, was released by Red Scare Industries in 2016. It was similarly enthusiastically reviewed, receiving 4/5 stars from Punknews.org and 4.5/5 stars from Dying Scene. Scene Point Blank called the record "carefully structured with rising and falling power within each song". and the Milwaukee Record called it "a potent 12-pack of socially-aimed rally cries that tote an overriding sense of cynicism."

The band toured Europe in early 2019 with French punk band Guerilla Poubelle.

== Members ==
- Seth Gile - vocals, guitar
- Alex Bammel - guitar
- Lauren Anderson - bass
- Jack Gribble - drums

== Discography ==
=== LPs ===
- Sawdust City (Kiss of Death Records, 2012)
- What a Time to Be Barely Alive (Red Scare Industries, 2016)

=== EPs ===
- Demo (no label, 2007)
- Comfort at Any Cost (Dead Format Records, 2010)
- Red Lanterns - The Third EP (Red Scare Industries, 2024)

=== Splits ===
- 3 Way Split (with the Manix and the Fake Boys, Kiss of Death Records, 2009)
- Arms Aloft / The Manix (Kiss of Death Records, 2011)
- Arms Aloft / Leagues Apart (Kiss of Death Records, All in Vinyl, 2012)
- Tâches Noires Vivantes / Living Black Spots (with Guerilla Poubelle, Guerilla Asso, 2015)

=== Live ===
- Live At Gilead Media Music Festival (no label, 2012)
