= Hope (American band) =

US musical group

- Genres: Rock
- Years active: 1969–1972
- Label: A&M Records
- Past members: Wayne McKibbin; Jeff Cozy; James Croegaert; Boyd Sibley; David Klug; Tom Eisenman

Hope was a Christian rock group from La Crosse, Wisconsin who released an album and three singles.

== Jesters III history ==
Before Hope existed there was a group from La Crosse, Wisconsin called Jesters III (not to be confused with the Jesters III from Gaffney, South Carolina). It consisted of Wayne McKibbin, Jim Burkhart and Tom Eisenman, with Tom Eisenman being the group leader. They appear to have evolved out of an act called the Jim and Chuck Duo and another act, the Saffires. By May 1965, Jesters III had already undertaken an extensive tour visiting Washington, Nevada, and California. On May 10, 1965, at 9 pm, they were to appear at the shindig held at the U Bar in La Crosse. In August 1965, coming straight off a tour of the West Coast, they were booked to play La Crosse's Hide-Away Bar on the 22nd of that month from 9:30 pm to 1:30 am. Also in, 1965, a single, "Pledge Of Love" backed with "Say That I’m The One" was released on the Coulee label. It was produced by Lindy Shannon. The track on the A side was written by Jim Burkhart and Chuck Hall. The B side was composed by Ramona Reed. On October 13, 1966, they along with Valhalla were to play the "Shindig" for the Student Union. An event that ran from 8:30 pm to 11:00 pm. In February 1967, they were booked to play the Varsity Club. In April 1967, they were again booked to play the Varsity Club, from Friday 14th through to Sunday 16th. The student newspaper at Wisconsin State University-La Crosse, The Racquet, was a common means of advertising Jesters III performances.

Members

- Jim Burkhart - bass
- Wayne McKibbin - guitar
- Tom Eisenman - drums

== Hope history ==
Hope came together in 1969. They were led by guitarist Wayne McKibbin. Other members were James Croegaert on piano, David Klug on bass, Boyd Sibley on organ and Jeff Cozy on drums. Before coming together as a group, some of the members were playing the rounds at the Midwestern bars and resorts. The group started playing at revivalist meetings, colleges, festivals in the mid west. They were led by Wayne McKibbin.

In April 1970, they appeared at the Sound Storm rock concert in Poynette, Wisconsin, a concert that also featured The Grateful Dead, Crow, Rotary Connection and Baby Huey & the Babysitters. On March 15, 1972, Hope and Chase were to appear at a concert held at the Mary E. Sawyer Auditorium.

In 1972, they had an album released on A&M Records called Hope.

The final concert for hope was held at Esofea Park in Esofea, Wisconsin. The event was an all day concert an included a picnic and farewell party. Several hundred fans and friends of the band turned up.

=== Later years ===
In later years, Wayne McKibbin became a Protestant chaplain and was working with prison inmates as head Chaplain of the California State Prison in Susanville, CA. He put together the "Freedom from Addiction" program which drew upon his own personal experiences with certain things he had encountered in his own life, things which he felt God had helped him overcome. McKibbin died from cancer on July 4, 2005, aged 59.

Tom L. Eisenman became a pastor and author and was based in California. Along with his wife Judie, he would conduct bible studies centering on marriage and family issues.

James F. Burkhart earned a PhD in physics from the University of Wisconsin at Milwaukee in 1973. After teaching at Gallaudet University, he became Chair of the UCCS Physics Department and director of the Western Regional Radon Training Center. In 1982, he received the Campus Outstanding Teaching Award. In 1986, he received the College of Letters, Arts, and Sciences Outstanding Teaching Award and in 1995, he received the Chancellor's Award. As of 2019, he is an emeritus Professor at UCCS.

== Line up ==
Version I (1969–72)

- Jeff Cozy - drums, percussion, vocals
- James Croegaert - keyboards, vocals
- Wayne McKibbin - guitar, vocals
- Boyd Sibley -keyboards, vocals
- David Klug - bass, vocals

Version II (1972)

- James Croegaert - keyboards, vocals
- Tom Eisenman - drums, percussion (replaced Jeff Cozy)
- Wayne McKibbin - guitar, vocals
- Boyd Sibley - keyboards, guitar
- David Klug - bass, vocals

== Discography ==
=== Singles ===
- The Jesters III - "Pledge Of Love" / "Say That I’m The One" - Coulee 114 - (1965)
- Hope - "One Man" / "Where Do You Want To Go" - Coulee C45-134 - (1968)
- "Where Do You Want To Go" / "Little Things" - A&M Records – 1355 - (1972)

=== Albums ===
- Hope - Hope - A&M Records SP 4329 - (1972)

=== Compilations ===
- Jesters III - "Say That I'm The One" on Various Artists - Gravel Volume 4 - Kumquat May KMGR 00004 - (2007)
