= Streetz-n-Young Deuces =

American hip-hop duo

- Also known as: SNYD
- Origin: Milwaukee, WI, United States
- Genres: Hip hop, rap, Midwest hip hop
- Years active: 2007–present
- Label: EMP Entertainment
- Members: Mark Strong; Rudy Strong
- Website: www.streetz-n-youngdeuces.com

Streetz-n-Young Deuces also known as SNYD is an American hip-hop group consisting of Mark and Rudy Strong. They are best known for the songs "Mad Flavor" and "So Fresh" from the AND1 DVD series. They are members and leaders of the hip-hop collective EMP Gang.

== History ==
=== 1986-2005: Early life and career beginnings ===
Cousins Mark and Rudy Strong grew up in Milwaukee, Wisconsin and have been working on music since a very young age. Inspired by artists like Jay-Z, DMX, and Method Man & Redman, the two decided to take music more seriously and pursue their passion as a career. In 2008 they released their mixtape We Want In Vol. 2, which resulted in being featured in The Source's "Unsigned Hype Section" and the UK'sRago Magazine. Their single "So Fresh" was featured on the AND1 DVD series. The mixtape went on to sell more than 15,000 units independently throughout the following year.

Immediately after the success of We Want In Vol. 2, Streetz-n-Young Deuces released their next mixtape, Money Marathon, a more commercial mixtape with more radio appeal than their previous work. The mixtape gained the group more magazine slots, including reviews in Ozone Magazine and Hip-Hop Weekly, and helped them get the attention of Aphilliates Music Group.

=== 2009-present: Next Day Air ===
In 2009, Streetz-n-Young Deuces started working with DJ Drama's protege, DJ Head Debiase, and went on to release two mixtapes through their brand. Straight Drop Muzik 1 & 2 were both heavy successes, posted on many notable hip-hop websites. With the help of Aphilliates Music Group, Streetz-n-Young Deuces went on to win "Up and Coming Artist of The Year" at the 1st Annual Get Em' Magazine Awards and "Best Indy Group" at the 6th Annual Southern Entertainment Awards.

That same year, Streetz-n-Young Deuces inked a sponsorship from Crunk Energy Drink, which has also sponsored Lil Jon, Pitbull, and Paul Wall.

Streetz-n-Young Deuces began working on their 6th mixtape, Next Day Air, hosted by Shade 45 DJ, DJ Averi Minor, and sponsored by major blog RubyHornet.com in 2011. The mixtape took nearly a year to be created but turned out to be one of the group's most credible mixtape with features from Mickey Factz and The Black Wall Street Records artist Mysonne. With the success of Next Day Air the two went on to perform at numerous colleges and the South By Southwest festival. Next Day Air was listed on OnMilwaukee.com as one of their "Top 10 Projects I'm looking forward to in 2012." SNYD then started working w/ Karmaloop to bring you a string of songs and videos, most notably the video to "Trouble.". After the success of working with Karmaloop the crew gained national attention from Sway Calloway, performed at the SXSW festival and graced the stage with the once MTV hosts artists and more. In 2016 Sway's website Sways Universe chose to sponsor and present their most critically acclaimed project The 8.

=== Solos ===
Burgie Streetz released the first solo project from SNYD entitled God's Hands which was highly praised for its lyricism, creativity and sound. Setting the bar for solo's from the crew a year later Young Deuces would release his socially aware project My Unapologetic Black Thoughts an album mixed with Spoken word from the artist himself. Coined as the most "Zoetic Album of 2018" by Sways Universe, the two proved that they can hold their own in the solo realm as well.

== Discography ==
=== Singles ===
- 2008: So Fresh (Produced By 800)
- 2010: Mad Flavor (Produced by Nova)
- 2011: Treadmill (Produced By Shotgun Shorty)
- 2012: Cadillac Muzik (Produced By Jae Swaggs)
- 2012: High Off Life (Produced By Timothy Wynn)
- 2014: Place Meft. Mickey Factz (Produced By Arsenix)
- 2015: The Releast ft. Trae tha Truth (Produced By Mammyth)
- 2016: Hey Now (Produced By Harry Fraud)

=== Albums and mixtapes ===
- 2008: We Want In Vol. 2
- 2010: Money Marathon
- 2011: Straight Drop Muzik
- 2011: Tha Midwest Go2Guyz
- 2011: Straight Drop Muzik 2 : SNYDpendence Day
- 2012: The Mad Flavor Experience
- 2014: Next Day Air (2012)
- 2016: The 8

== Magazines and features ==
- The Source (March 2008)
- Ozone Magazine (2008)
- Hip-Hop Weekly (2009)
