= Mike Bullman =

American singer, guitarist and songwriter

- Also known as: Mike Corliss
- Born: Spartanburg, South Carolina
- Genres: Rock; Country music
- Instrument: Guitar
- Years active: 1965–present

Mike Bullman is an American country and rock & roll singer, guitarist and songwriter originally from Spartanburg, South Carolina. For a period of time that spanned three decades, he was the leader of a group called The Jesters aka Jesters III. Some of the artists he has opened for include David Allan Coe, Ronnie McDowell and Jerry Reed. He is something of a local legend. He is also rumored to be Mike Corliss.

== Background ==
=== 1960s ===
His musical history goes back to his childhood when as a boy he wanted to be like Elvis Presley who was an obvious influence. He'd practice so he could sound like him. At the age of 12 he formed a band with his friends called Mikes Minors. His first gig was in Spartanburg at a local night club. The year was 1965.

=== 1970s - 1980s ===
In the May 1979, Bullman was appearing at the Gaffney Moose Lodge on Friday and Saturday nights. In the early 1980s, Bullman was in Nashville, Tennessee where he recorded for independent labels, cutting a couple of singles. He wasn't able to become established in the Nashville music scene and later left. He was also providing music at weddings in the early 1980s.

=== 1990s ===
In the 90's he was singing Buring Desire, a country group. Besides Bullman, the members were Kevin Eastes, Jeff Rogers, Randy Leith and Gary Rogers. In 1991, the band was at the S.C. Peach Festival in Gaffney where they won the rising star competition. In 1997, he was fronting the Mike Bullman band. In September of that year the group was playing at the Watermelon Crawl at Duncan Park.

=== 2000s ===
After a break from music for nearly a decade, Bullman returned to the scene in the 2000s and started regularly playing at Danz place in Poppy Square. In August 2009, he appeared with Kelly Road at the Saluda Mountain Jamboree.

== Jesters III ==
From the late 1960s he was the bandleader of an outfit called The Jesters. They were regular performers in Gaffney, South Carolina. In 1968, the group released a single called "Messed Up Woman" bw "You Said It All Before" on the Skyland Label. The single was co-written by Bullman along with Mike Harris and Pat Harris. It was produced by Armand Smith. Around 1971 or 1972, Jesters had a single produced by Howard A. Knight, Jr. It was "Funky Country" a funky country soul type of single with an Elvis Presley styled lead vocal. "Funky Country" was co-written by Bullman along with Mike Harris and Pat Harris. The flip side "Dream On And On" had Knight credited as the writer. In 1972, they group had another single produced by Knight. It was "Little Eve" bw "Lonely Blue Boy". It was credited to Jesters III, Mike Corliss-Vocal. The A side "Little Eve" was written by Bullman. In the Nashville Scene section of Billboard Magazine January 1972, it was announced that Mike Corliss and the Jesters had a new release on Boss Records.

"Messed Up Woman" appears on the Various Artists compilation Dateless Night, released in 1998 and another comp Move and Rock, released in 2008.

=== Confusion with other Jesters ===
There is another 1960s group called The Jesters III. They had a single "Pledge Of Love" / "Say That I’m The One" - Coulee 114, which was produced by Lindy Shannon. They are no relation to this group from South Carolina. This particular Jesters III group was formed a couple of years earlier in 1965. It was made up of Wayne McKibbon, Jim Burkhart and Tom Eisenman, and came from La Crosse, Wisconsin. They played other areas such as Washington, Nevada, and California. There was also another unrelated band from Athens, GA called The Jesters that was formed in 1964.

== Mike Corliss ==
In a February 1972 issue of Billboard, it was announced that Mike Corliss had a record for release on Boss Records which was to come out in March that year. It was cut at Monument Studios in Nashville. The single "You Said It All Before" bw "Too Much Of A Woman", was produced by Howard A. Knight, Jr., while the B side didn't have a credited composer, Bullman was credited as the composer on the A side.

== Recent activity ==
In September 2015, Bullman was appearing at the Chesnee Shrine Club. He had appeared there previously in 2014.

== Discography ==
=== Jesters III ===
Singles

- "Messed Up Woman" / "You Said It All Before" - Skyland 2019 - (1968)
- "Little Eve" / "Lonely Blue Boy" - Boss Records 1901 - (1972)
- "Funky Country" / "Dream On And On" - Champ Records 3001 - (1972?)

Various artist compilation album

- "Messed Up Woman" appears on Dateless Night - Buffalo Bop Bb-CD55069 - (1998), and Move And Rock - Collector CLCD 4519 (2000)

=== Mike Corliss ===
Singles

- "Too Much Of A Woman" / "You Said It All Before" - Boss Records 1902 - (1972)
