= True Records =

1970s record label

- Parent company: World Wide Music
- Status: Defunct
- Distributor: World Wide Music
- Genre: Country
- Country of origin: U.S.
- Location: Nashville, Tennessee

True Records was a record label that was active in the 1970s. It was located in Nashville, Tennessee. The distribution was handled by World Wide Music. It started attracting attention with artists such as Leon Everette and Claude King who had his Greatest Hit's Vol. 1 released on the label. Another artist to have his work released on the label was Mundo Earwood. The label's president from 1976 to 1977 was Howard A. Knight Jr.

== Artists ==
Other artists to have their work released on the label were Scotty Reed with "I Warm 'Em Up", and Dave Conway who had signed to the label in the early months of 1977. Mundo Earwood re-signed with the label in November 1977.

== Staff ==
The executive vice-president of the label as of November 1977 was Jerry Hayes. Before Leon Everette had his recordings released on True, he worked in the label's mailroom. He was signed to do a record as a tribute to Elvis Presley, but he wasn't happy about aspects of the contract and ripped it up.

== Discography ==
=== Singles ===
- Mundo Earwood - "Can't Keep On Keeping On" / "I Can Give You Love" - True T-101 - (1977)
- Scotty Reed - "I Warm 'Em Up" / "I'm Loving Her All Over In My Mind" - True T-102 -(1977)
- Claude King - "Cotton Dan" / "Cotton Dan" - True T-103 - (1977)
- Mundo Earwood - "Behind Blue Eyes" / "Let's Get Naked" - True T-104 - (1977)
- Claude King - "Sugar Baby, Candy Girl" / "Just A Bum's Husband" - True T-106 - (1977)
- Leon Everette - Goodbye King Of Rock 'n' Roll / " Where The Daisies Grow Wild" - True T-107 -(1977)
- Gloria Glore - "Promise Me Nothing" / "There Hangs His Hat" - True T-108 - (1977)
- Tiny Tim - "I'm Gonna Be A Country Queen" / "I Ain't No Cowboy (I Just Found This Hat)" - True T-109 - (1977)
- Leon Everette - "Love That Woman (Like The Devil Loves Sin)" / "Still Loving You" - True T-110 - (1977)
- Mundo Earwood - " Angeline" / "Just Another One Of Those Days" - True T-111 - (1977)
- Dave Conway - "Keep On Loving You" / "Too Late For Words" - True T-114 - (1978)
- Dave Conway - "Lookin' Back On Lovin' You" / "Please Don't Go" - True T-115 - (1978)
- Bill Dees - "Oh Pretty Woman" / "You Don't Have To Knock" - True T-120 - (1979)
- Spider Rich - " Butterfly's Lullaby" / " Butterfly's Lullaby" - True T-121 (1979) (promo)
- Claude King - "Wobble Watter" / "We Just Stood There And Cried" - True T-124 - (1980)
