= Johnny & The MoTones =

American blues band

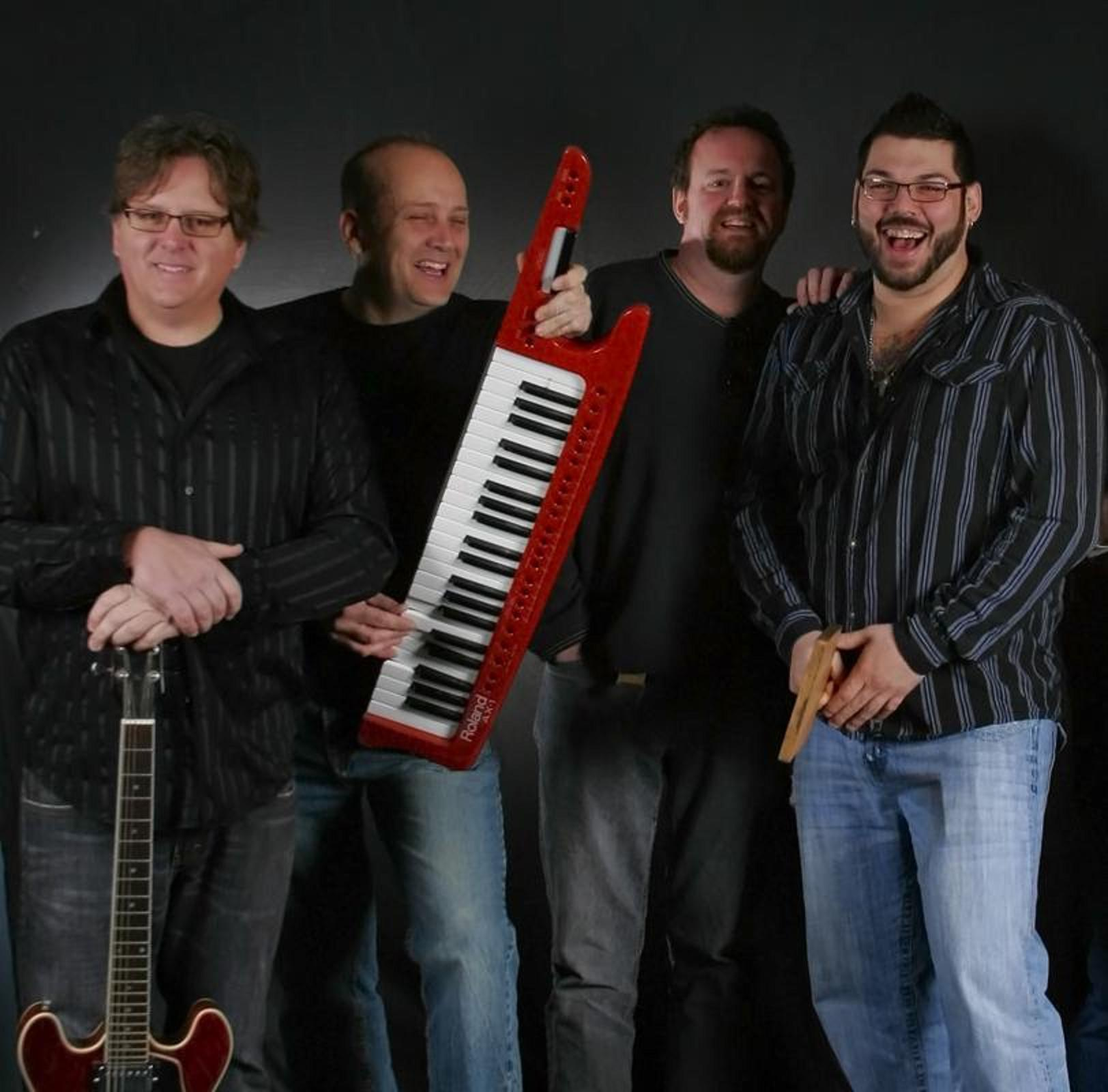
- Johnny & The MoTones in 2011

Background information
- Origin: Mosinee, Wisconsin, United States
- Genres: Blues, soul, jazz
- Years active: 2004 – present
- Labels: Altenburgh Records, The Orchard/Sony Entertainment
- Members: John Altenburgh, Mitch Viegut, Chris O'Keefe, Ryan Korb, Bruce Lammers, Paula Hall, Bob Kase, John Greiner
- Past members: David Hood, Mike Dillon, Keras Rubka Nimz, Mark Mattioli, Otis McLennon, James Lott, Kevin Moore, Ellen Altenburgh, Dave Baehr
- Website: altenburgh.com

Johnny & The MoTones is an American blues group from Wisconsin and led by the musician John Altenburgh.

== History ==
=== Beginnings ===
The group was created in 2004 after jazz recording artist John Altenburgh received an offer from Sun Studio president John Schorr to record for free after Altenburgh loaned antique recording equipment for display in the Sun Studio Museum. The result was the album, Two Hits For The Kitty, (The Sun Studio Sessions)

=== Ultimate Road Trip ===
Two Hits For The Kitty spent 18 weeks in the Roots Music Report & Cashbox blues charts in 2005. The album was recorded in three hours as the group did a roots "Live in the Studio" recording. Altenburgh played Jerry Lee Lewis's piano for part of the session. Jazz Review commented "[Two Hits For The Kitty] has all the energy you’d expect from a group playing in the hall of kings." Wisconsin Public Radio's Glen Moberg called it the "Ultimate Road Trip" as the group appeared on his show Route 51.

The group followed up that release with Get Gone (The Muscle Shoals Sessions), traveling to Rick Hall's Fame Studios in Muscle Shoals, Alabama. This session was recorded with sideman David Hood on bass. This time the group took seven hours to record their second "live in studio" album. Get Gone spent 17 weeks on the Roots Music Report, Cashbox (magazine) and Living Blues Blues Charts in 2007. Living Blues Magazine said, "This is swamp-rockin' Memphis soul, slightly updated but with a reverence for the old-fashioned blues-rock sound, with nasty guitars, gritty vocals, sassy original songs, and a borrowed rhythm section of David Hood and Mike Dillon Curington (from the Muscle Shoals Rhythm Section)." Wisconsin Public Radio said; "They took another road-trip and hit gold for the second time." "Get Gone" was engineered by Jimmy Nutt, whose credits include Jimmy Buffett and the Drive-By Truckers.

=== Studio recordings ===
In 2010 Johnny & The MoTones recorded Nothing To Lose. The group stayed in Wisconsin and did their first full production album at RiverSide Productions Recording Studio. Again the group spent significant time in the blues charts of the Roots Music Report, Cashbox and Real Blues Magazine as well as appearing in iTunes charts for Switzerland and Norway. The track, "Maybe Baby" hit the Roadhouse & Boogie Top 40 compiled by Cashbox and beachshag.com. Radio Indy commented, "Nothing to Lose impresses with strong vocals and a vibrant energy from the piano and excellent sax riffs while the bass and drums keep the steady beat". Mark Thompson of The Blues Historian wrote, "This is definitely a band with plenty of musical firepower. That may be why they explore a wide range of musical styles on this disc."

In 2012, the group was back in the studio to record the 2013 release Shake It. This album was heard on such syndicated blues shows as Blues Deluxe, Confessing The Blues, Smokestack Lightning, The Americana Music Show (several times), The House of Blues Radio Hour with Dan Aykroyd, and Main Street Blues. It marked the first time that the group appeared in Blues and Americana Music Charts. Blues Blast magazine said, "Johnny & The MoTones come out swingin’ long and strong with their self-produced collection of soul-based swing, jump swamp and gospel blues. They want you to 'Shake It', and deliver on all counts."

The group has produced many videos and documentaries of their recordings, specifically their time at Sun Studios and Fame Studios as well as videos made from Nothin' To Lose and Shake It (Row Me Down The Muddy Mississippi), appearing worldwide on shows such as EDM America TV. Many of their songs have been used for television documentaries and production music worldwide, including; NBC's Poker After Dark, Comedy Central, National Public Radio’s All Things Considered, and others.

== Discography ==
=== Albums ===
- 2005 Two Hits For The Kitty (The Sun Studio Sessions) Orchard/Sony
- 2007 Get Gone (The Muscle Shoals Sessions) Orchard/Sony
- 2010 Nothin' To Lose Orchard/Sony
- 2013 Shake It Orchard/Sony
- 2018 Highway 51 Orchard/Sony
- 2020 John Altenburgh Live Orchard/Sony

=== Compilation albums etc. ===
- 2008 Mark Mattioli Anthology Orchard/Sony
- 2009 Chris O'Keefe Anthology Orchard/Sony
- 2010 John Altenburgh "The Best of" Orchard/Sony
- 2011 Jazz "Jazz Rock 3" Various Artists Audiosparx
- 2011 Pop International "Family Music 3" Various Artists Rosenklang Records
- 2014 "Love Is In the Air" (Nothin' to Lose) Various Artists Happy Life Records
