= Howard A. Knight Jr. =

American country music promoter and record producer

- Born: Columbia, South Carolina, United States
- Occupations: Music producer, promotor
- Known for: Gods Wonderful World Inc.

Howard A. Knight Jr. is an American former country music promoter and record producer, who once planned to build a Bible-themed amusement park.

== Personal background ==
Knight comes from Columbia, South Carolina.

== Career ==
=== Companies and labels ===
During the 1970s, he was the president of Howard Knight Enterprises which was the umbrella org for Superior Record Distributing Co, a record distributor based in Nashville, Tennessee. Superior was located at Suite 102, 50 Music Square West. Knight was the president for Superior and Christopher McMillen was the executive vice-president. The company represented Grape Records, GMC Records, Colonial Records and Volunteer Records. In August 1979, the company moved a short distance, relocating to the SESAC building at 11 Music Square in Nashville. Around 1980, he formed a record company called HKE Records (Howard Knight Enterprises) that was operating out of Jackson, Mississippi. The first release for the label was by a country group from Louisiana called Blue Sage with "Fallin In Love Again" and "Bobbie Sue". Other acts to have releases were on the label were Aces Up and Devlin with "Door To Door Lover". Devlin, a country rock artist was also under Knight's personal management. In 1986, he formed Telstar Productions a company to produce, promote, market and distribute records. He also formed another record label called Pegasus Records. One of the first releases this label put out was a single by Mark Alan called "Wadda Done With My Heart".

=== Later years ===
His company Knight Shows & Events has promoted doll shows in North Carolina, South Carolina, and Georgia.

=== Amusement park ===
Knight claimed that he had a visitation from God and that he was instructed to build an amusement park with a biblical theme. The organization to oversee the running of the park was to be a non-profit org called Gods Wonderful World Inc. In 1997, the organization purchased a 2000-acre site near Gaffney, South Carolina. There were two sizable lakes and a river adjacent to the site. The theme of the park was to be Genesis to Revelation. It would feature electronic technology which included 3D movies and robotics.

== Music production ==
In 1971 he produced a funk-soul single called "Interpretation - Soul Power No.1" bw "Souladelic" for the group Soul Impossibles that was released on the Champ label. It was re-released years later on FUNK45. Among the other records he produced was an unusual record single called "Funky Country" by Jesters III. The track was a country soul-styled song with Elvis-type vocals by Mike Corliss. Another single for the group that he produced was "Little Eve" bw "Lonely Blue Boy" which was released in 1972. He also produced a solo single for Mike Corliss, "Too Much Of A Woman" bw "You Said It All Before" released on the Boss Records label in March 1972. In 1977, Knight produced a single for Leon Everette, "Sill Loving You".

=== List of productions (selective) ===
- Soul Impossibles - "Interpretation - Soul Power No.1"/ "Souladelic" - Champ 2030 - (1971)
- Jesters III - "Funky Country" / "Dream On And On" - Champ Records – 3001
- Jesters III - "Little Eve" / "Lonely Blue Boy" - Boss 1901 - (1972)
- Mike Corliss – "You Said It All Before" / "Too Much Of A Woman" - Boss Records No. 1902 - (1972)
- Claude King - "Cotton Dan" / "I'll Spend My Lifetime Loving You - True Records Inc. – T-103 - (1977)
- Claude King - "Sugar Baby, Candy Girl" / "Just A Bum Husband" - True T106 - (1977)
- Gloria Glore – "Promise Me Nothing" / "There Hangs His Hat" - True Records Inc. – T-108 - (1977)
- Leon Everette – "Goobye King Of Rock 'N' Roll" / "Where The Daisies Grow Wild" - True – T-107 - (1977)
- Leon Everette - "I Love That Woman (Like The Devil Loves Sin)" / "Still Loving You" - True T-110 - (1977)
- David Houston - "The Waltz Of The Angels" / "Next Sunday I'm Gonna Be Saved" - Electra E-45513 - (1978)
- Benjamin - "The Moon Man" / "The Moon Man" - Colonial SC-2007 - (1979)
- David Heavener - "First Day Of Never" / "Let's Go Chasing Rainbows" - Colonial SC-2008 - (1979)
- The Bandit Band - "Do You Wanna Fall In Love" / "Do You Wanna Fall In Love" - Pegasus Records HKE-PEG-108 - (1986)
- Soul Impossibles - "Interpretation - Soul Power No.1"/ "Souladelic" - Funk45 – FUNK45.036 - (2007)
