= Next Day Air (mixtape) =

Mixtape by Streetz-n-Young Deuces
- Released: March 20, 2012
- Genre: Hip hop
- Label: EMP Entertainment

Streetz-n-Young Deuces chronology
Straight Dop Muzik 2 (2011)	Next Day Air (2012)

Singles from Next Day Air
- 1. "Treadmill" Released: June 29, 2011; 2. "Cadillac Muzik" Released: February 2012; 3. "High Off Life" Released: March 6, 2012

Next Day Air is the sixth official mixtape from Milwaukee, Wisconsin group Streetz-n-Young Deuces. The mixtape was released on March 20, 2012, through EMP Entertainment. The mixtape's lead single, "Treadmill," was produced by Shotgun Shorty. The second single, "Cadillac Muzik," was produced by Jae Swaggs.

== Background ==
Streetz-n-Young Deuces began working on the mixtape immediately after Straight Drop Muzik. The project took nearly a full year to be produced. The mixtape was named for the film Next Day Air, but the two are unrelated.

== Track listing ==
No.	Title	Producer	Length
1.	"DJ Averi Minor Into"		0:52
2.	"Wu-Tang" (featuring Maal Himself & SPEAK Easy)	A. Dizzle	4:23
3.	"Beast Mode"		4:23
4.	"Came For The Money"	Dolla Bill	3:19
5.	"Pour Up"	Jae Swaggs	2:53
6.	"Just Like That"	AJA Productions	2:52
7.	"Treadmill"	Shotgun Shorty	2:53
8.	"Amazing"	Astro	2:31
9.	"High Off Life"	Timothy Wynn	2:29
10.	"Place Me" (featuring Mickey Factz)	Arsenix	3:12
11.	"Over You"	Reason	2:54
12.	"I'm Good"	JayKandDJTank	2:17
13.	"Pole"	Koncept Beats	3:17
14.	"Crazy"		2:50
15.	"The Struggle" (featuring Gerald Walker)	Jaywan	3:19
16.	"Hands High" (featuring Kristina Avant)	Artthebeat	2:51
17.	"Trained 2 Go" (featuring Yung Texxus)	Artthebeat	3:53
18.	"PDJ Averi Minor PSA"		0:34
19.	"Mad Flavor (Remix)" (featuring Mysonne & Spark Dawg)	Nova	3:54
20.	"Ridin'"	Shotgun Shorty	4:37
21.	"Cadillac Muzik" (featuring Kristina Avant)	Jae Swaggs	3:00
22.	"The Valley" (featuring Kristina Avant)	Big Steve	3:23
23.	"Dj Averi Minor Outro"		0:35
24.	"I'm Home" (featuring B-Eazy The Prince)	Hi-Fly	2:56

== Singles ==
The mixtape's first single was "Treadmill." A music video was shot and released through the RubyHornet.com website on April 30, 2012. The video was filmed, directed and edited by DADO Productions.

== Song notes ==
- The song "The Struggle" is a remake of the song they put out in 2008 featuring Geolani.
- The song "Place Me" which features Mickey Factz was noted as Streetz-n-Young Deuces' first XXL Magazine appearance.
