= Trunk Space =

American music venue in Phoenix, Arizona

The Trunk Space
- "Trunk", "The Space"
- Interactive map of The Trunk Space
- Location: 1124 N 3rd St, Phoenix, Arizona
- Owner: JRC, Stephanie Carrico
- Seating type: standing room, occasional chairs
- Type: all-ages music venue, Art Gallery
- Events: rock and roll, punk, experimental music, independent music, improv, talk show, comedy

Construction
- Opened: April 2004

Website
- www.thetrunkspace.com

The Trunk Space is an all-ages music venue in Phoenix, Arizona, United States. It was located at 1124 N 3rd Street since 2016, but announced a need to move after May 2024 due to cost pressures.

== Background ==
Originally a coffee cart called The Paper Cup in the later-defunct Paper Heart Gallery, in its original location on Van Buren Rd., co-owners JRC and Stephanie Carrico split from the Paper Heart Gallery to form The Trunk Space. The Trunk Space is an art gallery, coffee bar, and performance space. There are gallery shows twice a month, for Phoenix's First Friday and Third Friday art walks, with randomly occurring private events. The coffee bar features a full-service espresso machine which uses Xanadu coffee beans. The performance space is used for improv comedy, MST3K-styled movie showings and particularly, musical performances. Performers vary in genre, degree of experimentation and experience level.

The featured mural on the brick wall at the front entrance of The Trunk Space was painted by Luster Kaboom.

== Music ==
The Trunk Space is a venue for touring acts that are on the rise. Some acts that have come through include; Matt and Kim, Nobunny, Japanther, Mark Sultan (of The King Khan and BBQ Show fame), Julian Koster, Kimya Dawson, Neptune, Quintron and Lightning Bolt. Some notable acts have gotten their starts and have come to prominence through frequent appearances at the venue, including opening for some of the prominent touring acts.

Andrew Jackson Jihad, Michelle Blades, and TreasurE MammaL are a few bands that fall under that category.

== Performance Art ==
On top of monthly Improv and a Late-Night Talk Show, there are performance arts pieces of varying types, such as roasts of those living and deceased.

== Community ==
Over the years, The Trunk Space has a developed a close and personal group of volunteers and regulars, who consider the venue and its involved members as family. These regulars can be found helping run the door, running the espresso machine, setting up bands and running the sound board. Sean Bonnette of Andrew Jackson Jihad got a tattoo of The Trunk Space's street numbers, backwards, after noting them from frequently while performing on the stage, where the street numbers can be seen reversed above the door facing Grand Avenue. Since he has gotten the tattoo, numerous other family members have received the tattoo, including Carrico and JRC. At last count, at least a dozen presently have the tattoo.

In April 2014, the community celebrated The Trunk Space's 10th anniversary with a multiple-day concert festival, Indie 500, which featured dozens of bands, performing over the course of 10 days, with some 500 songs played in total.

== See also ==
- First Friday Art Walk
