= Dan Bellomy =

American organist

Dan Bellomy (1951 – August 29, 2008) was an American organist who performed on pipe and electric organs. Bellomy's theater organ performances were acclaimed for their inclusion of the jazz idiom, and he was at times described as a pure jazz organist. He wrote scripts for and directed several local television shows.

== Biography ==
Bellomy was born in Houston, Texas. He began playing the organ at the age of eight. His first television performance was at the age of eleven, and he began a career as a professional musician at age twelve.

He was employed by the Thomas Organ Company as a concert artist promoting their product, and then was with Hammond Organ Company for several years in the same capacity. In 1974 he was the house organist at Casa Mañana, being the first to hold that position, and where the first two of his albums were recorded. His duties there included performing for twenty minutes before every musical comedy performance.

In 1976 he was residing in Denver, Colorado, and became lead organist of the Organ Grinder Restaurant's satellite location in Denver. His next stint as an organist for a "pizza and pipes" restaurant was in Los Angeles, California, as the Great American Wind Machine. From at least 1985 to 1992 Bellomy was residing in Portland, Oregon. He became a house organist at the flagship Organ Grinder Restaurant in Portland, Oregon. Subsequently, he was a regular performer at Uncle Milt's Pizza in Vancouver, Washington. Bellomy was a featured performer at the 1989 American Theatre Organ Society national convention. While in the Portland metropolitan area he regularly participated in radio broadcasts and supplemented his income by teaching keyboard lessons.

From at least from 2000 to 2002 he was a resident of Boston. The year 2000 also saw him elected to the board of the American Theatre Organ Society. His career included performance tours across North America, Europe, Asia, and Australia. Bellomy fought cancer for a protracted period of time, and at age 57 succumbed to it on August 29, 2008. He was married at the time of his death to Ethel Bellomy.

== Performance and publication ==
Bellomy's theater organ performances were acclaimed for their inclusion of the jazz idiom, and he was at times described as a pure jazz organist. When requested to play his loudest registration selection for purposes of calibration by a recording engineer, Bellomy improvised a piece from scratch that wound up as the opening track on the CD. His improvisational ability was such that he only played a piece the same way on rare occasion. He was able to closely approximate the sound of a Hammond on a pipe organ, and at some concerts he switched between the pipe organ and a Hammond.

His personality was unusually irascible for a theater organist, but his supporters thought this added an aura to his performances, which reflected his wit, sarcasm, and raw emotional depth. His recordings and performances would include a mix of upbeat jazz numbers interspersed with opulent, passionate selections, slow in nature. His organist influences were Buddy Cole, Eddie Dunstedter, Billy Nale, Brian Rodwell, and George Wright, but he was also impacted by the vocal phrasings of Mel Tormé and Ella Fitzgerald. His first recording was criticized for over-reliance on bells, but upon his death the American Theatre Organ Society's publication stated "in every way he was a consummate presenter of the theatre pipe organ music at its best," noting his command of rhythm, harmony, sense of melody, and mastery of registration.

Bellomy wrote scripts for and directed several local television shows, and most notably served as music director for KNBC's show The Sunday Show. When in Boston he created his own show which ran on various local cable channels entitled The Music You Remember.

Bellomy reviewed record releases for two publications, Keyboard World and The Console.

=== Discography ===
- The Night Is Young (1975) – recorded at the Casa Mañana, Fort Worth, Texas.
- Consoles Up (pre-1977)
- Fusion: Then and Now (pre-1979)
- Power Pipes (Dan Bellomy, 1985) – recorded at the Organ Grinder Restaurant, Portland, Oregon.
- Pipe-Pourri (Beldale Records, 1987) – with M. B. Gordy, drums. Recorded at private residence, Portland, Oregon.
- Puttin' on the Pipes (Milt K Recordings, 1992) recorded at Uncle Milt's Pipe Organ Pizza, Vancouver, Washington.
- Live from New York (Dan Bellomy Productions, 1994) recorded at Brooklyn Paramount Theater
- Back to Brooklyn (Cambria Master Recordings, 1997) – recorded at Brooklyn Paramount Theater
- Fulton Blue (Dan Bellomy Productions, 2001) – recorded at Warnors Theatre.
- The Zurich Sessions (Dan Bellomy Productions, 2002) – with Brian Wilson, percussion and M. L. Foote, bass.
- Dan Bellomy Remembered – The Capri Recording (released 2009, recorded 1991 and 2004)
