= Eugene Luening =

American musician and educator

Eugene Luening (sometimes Eugen Luening) (1852–1944) was a Milwaukee-born musician and educator of German descent.

== Career ==
Prior to December 1885, Luening served as director of the Milwaukee Musical Society.

In May 1888, the Luening Conservatory of Music was founded in Milwaukee by twelve people including Henry M. Mended, B. H. Eiring and R. F. Luening. The school had its official opening ceremony in November 1889. In May 1892, Luening resigned as manager of the Luening Conservatory of Music and its name was changed to the Milwaukee Conservatory of Music.

In September 1909, Luening began serving as acting director of the University of Wisconsin–Madison School of Music following the resignation of Rossetter Gleason Cole.

In 1912, Luening and his family moved to Munich in Bavaria, Germany. He remained in the area during much of World War I, returning to Milwaukee in October 1918.

== Personal life ==
Luening was the father of musician Otto Luening, who was a pioneering figure in the composition of electronic music.
