= Gary Brunotte =

American jazz musician (born 1948)

- Genres: Jazz, post-bop
- Occupations: Musician, composer
- Instruments: Piano, organ, accordion
- Label: Sincopato Records
- Website: garybrunotte.com

Gary Brunotte (born October 4, 1948, in St. Paul, Minnesota) is an American post-bop jazz musician.

In 1992 Brunotte recorded the album Yesterday's Dream, which included saxophonist Eric Marienthal.

== Select discography ==
- Yesterdays Dream – 1993
- Conversations – 2005
- Smile – 2006
- Manic Moments 2007
- About Time – 2008

== See also ==
- List of jazz arrangers
- List of jazz organists
- List of jazz pianists
