= VO5 (band) =

American band

VO5 is an American nu-disco and funk band from Madison, Wisconsin formed in 2005.

== Career ==
In 2015 VO5 released the album Dance Originality. A music video for the single "Dance Originality" won the VOTD.TV award and was on rotation on MTV. VO5 has shared a stage with disco legends the Village People and KC and the Sunshine Band.

VO5 performed at the 2012 Scott Walker recall election mass protests alongside Michelle Shocked. Their song "Cheddar Revolution" was included in the Cheddar Revolution: Songs of Uprising CD compilation.

During the 2010 US Senate election, a video of VO5 performing the song "Wonder Woman" along with candidate Tammy Baldwin gained national attention after Wisconsin governor Tommy Thompson campaign employee Brian Nemoir questioned Baldwin's "heartland values" for dancing at a gay rights parade. Tommy Thompson was forced to apologize for his aides' "gay-baiting" in a TV ad and Baldwin went on to win the election.

In 2025, VO5 held a 20th anniversary concert with over 40 guest musicians. At the event, Mayor Satya Rhodes-Conway officially declared November 15th “VO5 Day of Disco Joy” in the city of Madison.

== Discography ==
- 2006 "Wisconsin Rap" (single)
- 2008 "Wonder Woman" (single)
- 2010 Disco Your Ass Off EP
- 2012 "Cheddar Revolution" (single)
- 2015 Dance Originality LP
- 2016 "If You Build a Wall (We'll Tear It Down)" (single)

== Reviews and profiles ==
- Wisconsin State Journal
- Isthmus
- PBS
- The State Times, NY
- Maximum Ink Magazine
- Rolling Disco Balls Magazine
- World Music Central
