= Laarks =

American indie rock band

- Origin: Eau Claire, Wisconsin
- Genre: Indie Rock
- Label: Absolutely Kosher Records
- Members: Brian Moen, Zach Hanson, Kyle Flater, Ian Jacoby
- Past members: Will Anderson, Christopher Porterfield
- Website: http://www.laarks.com

Laarks is an indie-rock band based out of Eau Claire, Wisconsin. Absolutely Kosher Records, an independent California-based music label, signed a recording contract with Laarks in August, 2009. Laarks' first record, An Exaltation of Laarks was released by Absolutely Kosher on November 3, 2009 and the LP was released on January 12, 2010.

== Members ==
Laarks is made up of four members: Ian Jacoby on keyboard and vocals; Kyle Flater on guitar; Brian Moen on drums; and Zach Hanson on bass guitar. Current members of Laarks are former members of other bands such as Amateur Love, Sic Transit Gloria, The Softrocks, Laughing Bell, and The Shouting Matches.

== Influences ==
Laarks lists musical influences including Wilco, Josh Rouse, Death Cab for Cutie, The Killers, The Weakerthans, Neil Young, Love-Cars, Halloween, Alaska, Pete Yorn, The Bad Plus, U2, Sigur Rós, The Strokes, Amateur Love, Elliott Smith, Sufjan Stevens, Jon Brion, and Helmet.

== Reception ==
Laarks' release of their album An Exaltation of Laarks, both before and after signing with Absolutely Kosher Records, has been met with high praise. Volume One, a local Eau Claire, Wisconsin publication praised Exaltation's style and technical skill when they wrote:

"An Exaltation of Laarks showcases not only the complexities of Jacoby and company’s songwriting, full of winding progressions and mood swings galore, but also an array of drummer Brian Moen’s intricate engineering skills...Songs start and end in a bath of guitar swells and muddled keyboard bleeps. Drums get run through layers of effects and filters, and vocal lines are harmonized and constantly shifting panels to attack from different perspectives. The 10 tracks fit together because of it, embracing the same artistic concepts and making the album feel more like a finished puzzle than separate pieces".

Absolutely Kosher Records praises Exaltation for its energy and individuality and proudly releases the album whose "end result is a record full of melodic hooks embedded in indie rock mini-epics, with raucous crescendos and climaxes of textures pinned between pauses and composed reflection. The band pushes and prods Jacoby’s astute-yet-innocent pop songs into dynamic, overblown declarations of grandeur with layered keyboards, organs and guitars swirling around pulsing, driving bass and frantic, fiery drums. It’s the sound of a band markedly assured for a debut, delightfully void of irony, with a maelstrom of reference points resulting in some of the most vigorous, fervent electrifying pop music on any side of the Chippewa River".

=== Additional reviews ===
Reveille Magazine

InDigest

City Pages

Jonk Music

The Spectator

Pitchfork

== Live performances ==
The majority of Laarks shows are played in and around Wisconsin's Chippewa Valley. The House of Rock, The Cabin, The Stones Throw, and The Grand Little Theater are popular Eau Claire, Wisconsin venues. Concerts in the Minneapolis-Saint Paul, Minnesota area are also common. Laarks completed a 2008 summer tour of the mid-west with fellow Eau Claire-based band The Daredevil Christopher Wright that took them further afield and in September, 2009 they played at South Dakota State University with OK Go.

Laarks began their U.S. tour for Absolutely Kosher in February 2010. Their itinerary included stops at the NoisePop Festival in San Francisco, California; the Viper Room in Los Angeles, California; and Trunk Space in Phoenix, Arizona.

== Discography ==
=== Albums ===
An Exaltation of Laarks (March, 2009 - Self-released; November 3, 2009 - US CD)

An Exaltation of Laarks
